= WHK =

WHK may refer to:

== Broadcasting ==
- WHK (AM), a radio station (1420 AM) licensed to Cleveland, Ohio, United States, which has identified as WHK twice (1922–2001, 2005–present)
- WHKW, a radio station (1220 AM) licensed to Cleveland, Ohio, United States, which identified as WHK from 2001 to 2005
- WCCD, a radio station (1000 AM) licensed to Parma, Ohio, United States, which briefly identified as WHK in 2001

== Other ==
- Scientific-Humanitarian Committee (German: Wissenschaftlich-humanitäres Komitee, WhK), an LGBT rights organisation
- Whakatane Airport, an airport in Whakatane, New Zealand, currently assigned the IATA code WHK
- Windhoek, the capital city of Namibia.

== See also ==
- WHK-FM (disambiguation)
- Carvel, Alberta home to the CWHK weather station.
