= List of designated places in Alberta =

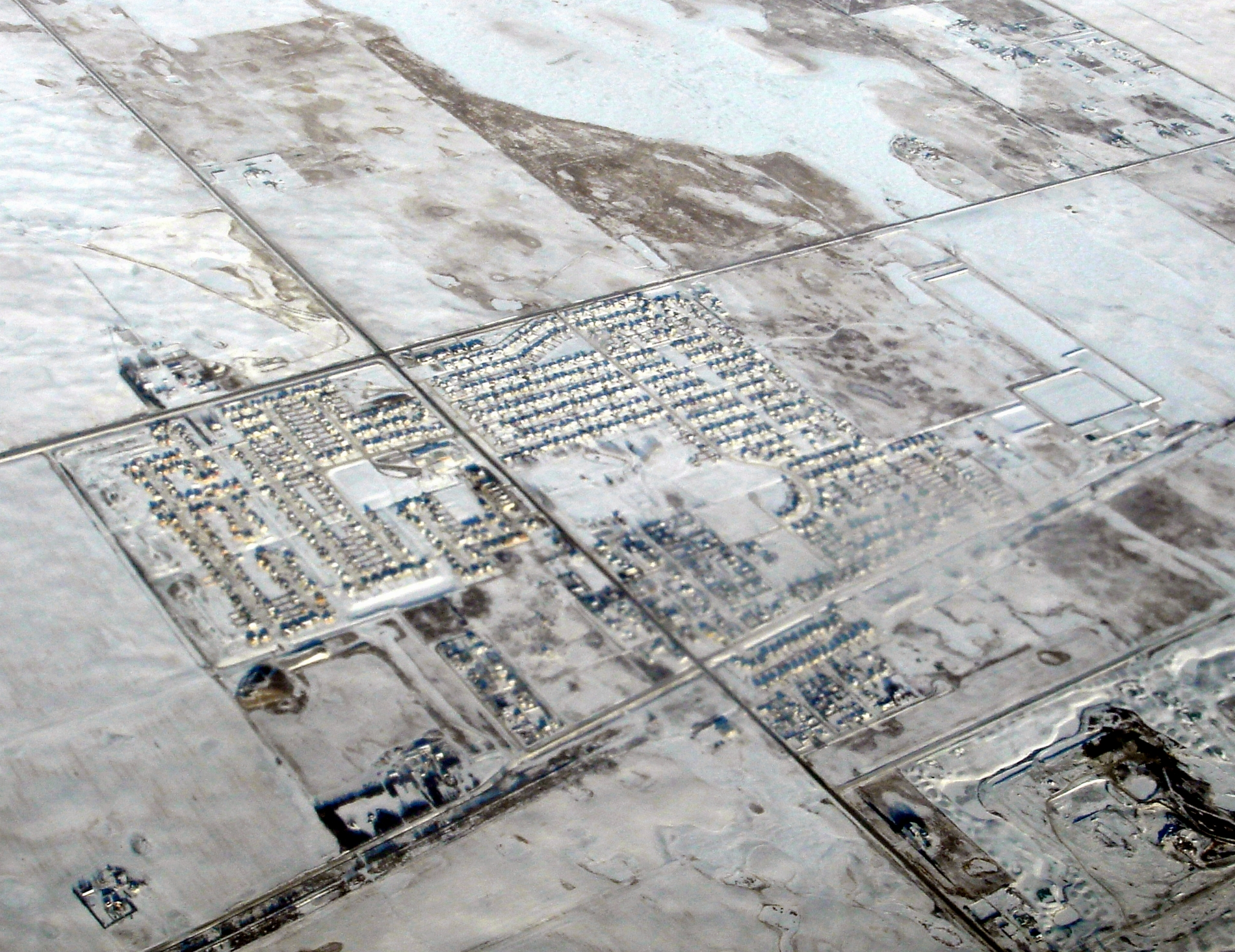
Aerial view of the Hamlet of Langdon, Alberta's most populous designated place

A designated place is a type of geographic unit used by Statistics Canada to disseminate census data. It is usually "a small community that does not meet the criteria used to define incorporated municipalities or Statistics Canada population centres (areas with a population of at least 1,000 and no fewer than 400 persons per square kilometre)." Provincial and territorial authorities collaborate with Statistics Canada in the creation of designated places so that data can be published for sub-areas within municipalities. Starting in 2016, Statistics Canada allowed the overlapping of designated places with population centres.

At the 2021 Census of Population, Alberta had 311 designated places, an increase from 304 in 2011. Designated place types in Alberta include 18 dissolved municipalities, 10 Métis settlements, and 283 unincorporated places. In 2021, the 311 designated places had a cumulative population of 78,571 and an average population of 253. Alberta's largest designated place is Langdon with a population of 5,497.

== List ==
List of designated places in Alberta
Name	Type	Sub-type	Census subdivision	2021 Census of Population				
Name	Type	Sub-type	Census subdivision	Population (2021)	Population (2016)	Change (%)	Land area (km^{2})	Population density (per km^{2})
Acadia Valley	Unincorporated place	Hamlet	Acadia No. 34, MD of	143	149	−4.0%	0.46	310.9/km^{2}
Aetna	Unincorporated place	Hamlet	Cardston County	109	113	−3.5%	0.95	114.7/km^{2}
Alcomdale	Unincorporated place	Hamlet	Sturgeon County	65	88	−26.1%	0.2	325.0/km^{2}
Alder Flats	Unincorporated place	Hamlet	Wetaskiwin No. 10, County of	137	167	−18.0%	1.85	74.1/km^{2}
Antler Lake	Unincorporated place	Hamlet	Strathcona County	412	457	−9.8%	0.77	535.1/km^{2}
Anzac	Unincorporated place	Hamlet	Wood Buffalo, RM of	506	548	−7.7%	8.57	59.0/km^{2}
Ardmore	Unincorporated place	Hamlet	Bonnyville No. 87, MD of	346	315	+9.8%	0.68	508.8/km^{2}
Ardrossan	Unincorporated place	Hamlet	Strathcona County	898	484	+85.5%	2.5	359.2/km^{2}
Armena	Unincorporated place	Hamlet	Camrose County	37	42	−11.9%	0.7	52.9/km^{2}
Artists View Park West	Unincorporated place	Locality	Rocky View County	205	219	−6.4%	1.33	154.1/km^{2}
Ashmont	Unincorporated place	Hamlet	St. Paul No. 19, County of	125	133	−6.0%	1.11	112.6/km^{2}
Atmore	Unincorporated place	Hamlet	Athabasca County	10	35	−71.4%	0.54	18.5/km^{2}
Balmoral Heights	Unincorporated place	—	Red Deer County	196	193	+1.6%	0.64	306.3/km^{2}
Beaver Lake	Unincorporated place	Hamlet	Lac La Biche County	467	482	−3.1%	1.1	424.5/km^{2}
Beaver Mines	Unincorporated place	Hamlet	Pincher Creek No. 9, MD of	85	82	+3.7%	0.66	128.8/km^{2}
Bellevue	Unincorporated place	Locality	Crowsnest Pass, Municipality of	911	866	+5.2%	3.01	302.7/km^{2}
Bellis	Unincorporated place	Hamlet	Smoky Lake County	60	50	+20.0%	0.23	260.9/km^{2}
Benalto	Unincorporated place	Hamlet	Red Deer County	198	177	+11.9%	0.48	412.5/km^{2}
Benchlands	Unincorporated place	Hamlet	Bighorn No. 8, MD of	59	43	+37.2%	0.41	143.9/km^{2}
Bezanson	Unincorporated place	Hamlet	Grande Prairie No. 1, County of	133	107	+24.3%	1.11	119.8/km^{2}
Birch Hill Park	Unincorporated place	Locality	Parkland County	112	107	+4.7%	0.43	260.5/km^{2}
Bircham	Unincorporated place	Hamlet	Kneehill County	5	5	0.0%	0.14	35.7/km^{2}
Blackfoot	Unincorporated place	Hamlet	Vermilion River, County of	386	407	−5.2%	0.95	406.3/km^{2}
Blackie	Unincorporated place	Hamlet	Foothills County	360	314	+14.6%	0.76	473.7/km^{2}
Blue Ridge	Unincorporated place	Hamlet	Woodlands County	211	244	−13.5%	2.98	70.8/km^{2}
Bluesky	Unincorporated place	Hamlet	Fairview No. 136, MD of	113	127	−11.0%	0.37	305.4/km^{2}
Bluffton	Unincorporated place	Hamlet	Ponoka County	140	143	−2.1%	0.5	280.0/km^{2}
Bodo	Unincorporated place	Hamlet	Provost No. 52, MD of	30	20	+50.0%	0.36	83.3/km^{2}
Botha	Dissolved municipality	Hamlet	Stettler No. 6, County of	180	204	−11.8%	1.08	166.7/km^{2}
Bragg Creek	Unincorporated place	Hamlet	Rocky View County	432	418	+3.3%	1.55	278.7/km^{2}
Braim	Unincorporated place	Locality	Camrose County	85	93	−8.6%	0.42	202.4/km^{2}
Bristol Oakes	Unincorporated place	—	Sturgeon County	240	242	−0.8%	0.32	750.0/km^{2}
Brownvale	Unincorporated place	Hamlet	Peace No. 135, MD of	114	115	−0.9%	3.06	37.3/km^{2}
Bruce	Unincorporated place	Hamlet	Beaver County	65	60	+8.3%	0.86	75.6/km^{2}
Brule	Unincorporated place	Hamlet	Yellowhead County	127	74	+71.6%	1.52	83.6/km^{2}
Buck Lake	Unincorporated place	Hamlet	Wetaskiwin No. 10, County of	60	51	+17.6%	1.37	43.8/km^{2}
Buffalo Lake	Métis settlement	—	Smoky Lake County	379	712	−46.8%	335.68	1.1/km^{2}
Buford	Unincorporated place	Hamlet	Leduc County	33	47	−29.8%	2.61	12.6/km^{2}
Burdett	Unincorporated place	Hamlet	Forty Mile No. 8, County of	331	401	−17.5%	0.69	479.7/km^{2}
Busby	Unincorporated place	Hamlet	Westlock County	135	140	−3.6%	0.67	201.5/km^{2}
Byemoor	Unincorporated place	Hamlet	Stettler No. 6, County of	30	35	−14.3%	0.59	50.8/km^{2}
Cadogan	Unincorporated place	Hamlet	Provost No. 52, MD of	108	113	−4.4%	0.64	168.8/km^{2}
Cadomin	Unincorporated place	Hamlet	Yellowhead County	54	40	+35.0%	1.02	52.9/km^{2}
Cadotte Lake	Unincorporated place	Hamlet	Northern Sunrise County	23	61	−62.3%	1.39	16.5/km^{2}
Calahoo	Unincorporated place	Hamlet	Sturgeon County	143	123	+16.3%	0.66	216.7/km^{2}
Calling Lake	Unincorporated place	Hamlet	Opportunity No. 17, MD of	375	448	−16.3%	64.62	5.8/km^{2}
Canyon Creek	Unincorporated place	Hamlet	Lesser Slave River No. 124, MD of	318	325	−2.2%	4.22	75.4/km^{2}
Canyon Heights	Unincorporated place	Locality	Red Deer County	33	93	−64.5%	0.32	103.1/km^{2}
Carbondale	Unincorporated place	Hamlet	Sturgeon County	78	75	+4.0%	1.12	69.6/km^{2}
Cardiff	Unincorporated place	Hamlet	Sturgeon County	1,033	1,167	−11.5%	0.98	1,054.1/km^{2}
Carseland	Unincorporated place	Hamlet	Wheatland County	542	525	+3.2%	0.56	967.9/km^{2}
Cayley	Unincorporated place	Hamlet	Foothills County	414	377	+9.8%	0.62	667.7/km^{2}
Chancellor	Unincorporated place	Hamlet	Wheatland County	5	5	0.0%	0.32	15.6/km^{2}
Cheadle	Unincorporated place	Hamlet	Wheatland County	83	109	−23.9%	0.43	193.0/km^{2}
Chin	Unincorporated place	Hamlet	Lethbridge County	83	62	+33.9%	0.09	922.2/km^{2}
Chipewyan Lake	Unincorporated place	Locality	Opportunity No. 17, MD of	72	86	−16.3%	4.29	16.8/km^{2}
Chisholm	Unincorporated place	Hamlet	Lesser Slave River No. 124, MD of	15	25	−40.0%	2.84	5.3/km^{2}
Clandonald	Unincorporated place	Hamlet	Vermilion River, County of	117	109	+7.3%	0.47	248.9/km^{2}
Clearwater Estates	Unincorporated place	Locality	Parkland County	41	76	−46.1%	0.25	164.0/km^{2}
Cluny	Unincorporated place	Hamlet	Wheatland County	50	70	−28.6%	0.69	72.5/km^{2}
Cochrane Lake	Unincorporated place	Hamlet	Rocky View County	767	799	−4.0%	3.8	201.8/km^{2}
Colinton	Unincorporated place	Hamlet	Athabasca County	169	254	−33.5%	3.55	47.6/km^{2}
Collingwood Cove	Unincorporated place	Hamlet	Strathcona County	377	363	+3.9%	2.52	149.6/km^{2}
Conklin	Unincorporated place	Hamlet	Wood Buffalo, RM of	154	185	−16.8%	16.29	9.5/km^{2}
Conrich	Unincorporated place	Hamlet	Rocky View County	15	20	−25.0%	0.18	83.3/km^{2}
Crystal Meadows	Unincorporated place	Locality	Parkland County	123	121	+1.7%	1.14	107.9/km^{2}
Dalemead	Unincorporated place	Hamlet	Rocky View County	25	30	−16.7%	0.18	138.9/km^{2}
Dalroy	Unincorporated place	Hamlet	Rocky View County	39	50	−22.0%	0.17	229.4/km^{2}
Dapp	Unincorporated place	Hamlet	Westlock County	30	20	+50.0%	0.31	96.8/km^{2}
Dawn Valley	Unincorporated place	Locality	Parkland County	173	185	−6.5%	1.21	143.0/km^{2}
Dead Man's Flats	Unincorporated place	Hamlet	Bighorn No. 8, MD of	377	125	+201.6%	1.23	306.5/km^{2}
DeBolt	Unincorporated place	Hamlet	Greenview No. 16, MD of	132	121	+9.1%	2.79	47.3/km^{2}
Delacour	Unincorporated place	Hamlet	Rocky View County	5	10	−50.0%	0.17	29.4/km^{2}
Derwent	Dissolved municipality	Hamlet	Two Hills No. 21, County of	96	85	+12.9%	0.37	259.5/km^{2}
Desert Blume	Unincorporated place	Hamlet	Cypress County	835	574	+45.5%	1.43	583.9/km^{2}
Devonshire Meadows	Unincorporated place	Locality	Parkland County	137	136	+0.7%	2.08	65.9/km^{2}
Diamond City	Unincorporated place	Hamlet	Lethbridge County	204	184	+10.9%	0.51	400.0/km^{2}
Dickson	Unincorporated place	Hamlet	Red Deer County	50	58	−13.8%	0.16	312.5/km^{2}
Dixonville	Unincorporated place	Hamlet	Northern Lights, County of	96	108	−11.1%	0.64	150.0/km^{2}
Duffield	Unincorporated place	Hamlet	Parkland County	60	67	−10.4%	0.32	187.5/km^{2}
Duhamel	Unincorporated place	Hamlet	Camrose County	46	47	−2.1%	1.25	36.8/km^{2}
Dunmore	Unincorporated place	Hamlet	Cypress County	1,088	1,100	−1.1%	5.6	194.3/km^{2}
Eaglesham	Unincorporated place	Hamlet	Birch Hills County	76	93	−18.3%	0.84	90.5/km^{2}
East Prairie	Métis settlement	—	Big Lakes County	310	304	+2.0%	328.42	0.9/km^{2}
East Vistas	Unincorporated place	—	Leduc County	660	15	+4,300.0%	5.72	115.4/km^{2}
Eastview Acres	Unincorporated place	Locality	Lethbridge County	45	38	+18.4%	1.17	38.5/km^{2}
Egremont	Unincorporated place	Hamlet	Thorhild County	46	48	−4.2%	0.19	242.1/km^{2}
Elizabeth	Métis settlement	—	Bonnyville No. 87, MD of	594	653	−9.0%	246.45	2.4/km^{2}
Elkwater	Unincorporated place	Locality	Cypress County	83	84	−1.2%	0.68	122.1/km^{2}
Ellscott	Unincorporated place	Hamlet	Athabasca County	5	10	−50.0%	1.28	3.9/km^{2}
Endiang	Unincorporated place	Hamlet	Stettler No. 6, County of	15	15	0.0%	0.61	24.6/km^{2}
Enilda	Unincorporated place	Hamlet	Big Lakes County	145	155	−6.5%	0.72	201.4/km^{2}
Entwistle	Unincorporated place	Hamlet	Parkland County	429	480	−10.6%	1.96	218.9/km^{2}
Erin Estates	Unincorporated place	Locality	Parkland County	75	122	−38.5%	0.66	113.6/km^{2}
Erskine	Unincorporated place	Hamlet	Stettler No. 6, County of	319	282	+13.1%	0.86	370.9/km^{2}
Evansburg	Unincorporated place	Hamlet	Yellowhead County	717	795	−9.8%	2.84	252.5/km^{2}
Exshaw	Unincorporated place	Hamlet	Bighorn No. 8, MD of	449	412	+9.0%	1.55	289.7/km^{2}
Fairview (Note: Different from the Town of Fairview in northwest Alberta.)	Unincorporated place	Hamlet	Lethbridge County	165	154	+7.1%	0.16	1,031.3/km^{2}
Faust	Unincorporated place	Hamlet	Big Lakes County	282	261	+8.0%	4.42	63.8/km^{2}
Fawcett	Unincorporated place	Hamlet	Westlock County	60	82	−26.8%	0.46	130.4/km^{2}
Ferintosh	Unincorporated place	Hamlet	Camrose County	180	202	−10.9%	0.64	281.3/km^{2}
Ferrier Acres Trailer Court (Note: Also known as Ferrier.)	Unincorporated place	Locality	Clearwater County	258	421	−38.7%	2.84	90.8/km^{2}
Fishing Lake	Métis settlement	—	Bonnyville No. 87, MD of	414	446	−7.2%	348.64	1.2/km^{2}
Flatbush	Unincorporated place	Hamlet	Lesser Slave River No. 124, MD of	30	45	−33.3%	0.69	43.5/km^{2}
Fleming Park	Unincorporated place	Locality	Parkland County	103	110	−6.4%	0.73	141.1/km^{2}
Flyingshot Lake	Unincorporated place	Locality	Grande Prairie No. 1, County of	237	269	−11.9%	7.29	32.5/km^{2}
Fort Assiniboine	Unincorporated place	Hamlet	Woodlands County	158	176	−10.2%	0.75	210.7/km^{2}
Fort Chipewyan	Unincorporated place	Hamlet	Wood Buffalo, RM of	798	852	−6.3%	9.93	80.4/km^{2}
Fort Kent	Unincorporated place	Hamlet	Bonnyville No. 87, MD of	254	261	−2.7%	0.64	396.9/km^{2}
Fort Vermilion	Unincorporated place	Hamlet	Mackenzie County	753	639	+17.8%	5.36	140.5/km^{2}
Frank	Unincorporated place	Locality	Crowsnest Pass, Municipality of	147	114	+28.9%	4.09	35.9/km^{2}
Gadsby	Dissolved municipality	Hamlet	Stettler No. 6, County of	36	40	−10.0%	0.72	50.0/km^{2}
Gainford	Unincorporated place	Hamlet	Parkland County	118	99	+19.2%	1.36	86.8/km^{2}
Galahad	Dissolved municipality	Hamlet	Flagstaff County	125	111	+12.6%	0.45	277.8/km^{2}
Garden Grove Estates	Unincorporated place	Locality	Parkland County	283	282	+0.4%	1.99	142.2/km^{2}
Garden River	Unincorporated place	Locality	Improvement District No. 24	706	643	+9.8%	15.78	44.7/km^{2}
Gift Lake part A (Note: One of two parts of Gift Lake Metis Settlement.)	Métis settlement	—	Big Lakes County	625	658	−5.0%	802.46	0.8/km^{2}
Gift Lake part B (Note: One of two parts of Gift Lake Metis Settlement.)	Métis settlement	—	Northern Sunrise County	0	0	NA	0.83	0.0/km^{2}
Gleichen	Unincorporated place	Hamlet	Wheatland County	314	324	−3.1%	1.42	221.1/km^{2}
Glory Hills	Unincorporated place	Locality	Sturgeon County	195	244	−20.1%	1.43	136.4/km^{2}
Grande Cache	Dissolved municipality	Hamlet	Greenview No. 16, MD of	3,276	3,571	−8.3%	35.21	93.0/km^{2}
Grandmuir Estates	Unincorporated place	Locality	Parkland County	91	88	+3.4%	0.62	146.8/km^{2}
Granum	Dissolved municipality	Hamlet	Willow Creek No. 26, MD of	557	406	+37.2%	1.89	294.7/km^{2}
Grassland	Unincorporated place	Hamlet	Athabasca County	46	68	−32.4%	1.45	31.7/km^{2}
Grassy Lake	Unincorporated place	Hamlet	Taber, MD of	856	799	+7.1%	1.55	552.3/km^{2}
Green Acre Estates	Unincorporated place	Locality	Parkland County	137	149	−8.1%	1.39	98.6/km^{2}
Gregoire Lake Estates	Unincorporated place	Hamlet	Wood Buffalo, RM of	138	165	−16.4%	0.41	336.6/km^{2}
Grouard	Unincorporated place	Hamlet	Big Lakes County	166	255	−34.9%	4.52	36.7/km^{2}
Gunn	Unincorporated place	Hamlet	Lac Ste. Anne County	26	15	+73.3%	0.44	59.1/km^{2}
Gwynne	Unincorporated place	Hamlet	Wetaskiwin No. 10, County of	93	73	+27.4%	0.5	186.0/km^{2}
Half Moon Lake	Unincorporated place	Hamlet	Strathcona County	87	223	−61.0%	0.93	93.5/km^{2}
Harmony	Unincorporated place	Hamlet	Rocky View County	757	0	NA	6.92	109.4/km^{2}
Harvie Heights	Unincorporated place	Hamlet	Bighorn No. 8, MD of	163	184	−11.4%	0.62	262.9/km^{2}
Hastings Lake	Unincorporated place	Hamlet	Strathcona County	94	94	0.0%	0.7	134.3/km^{2}
Hawk Hills	Unincorporated place	—	Red Deer County	52	42	+23.8%	0.26	200.0/km^{2}
Haynes	Unincorporated place	Hamlet	Lacombe County	15	20	−25.0%	0.27	55.6/km^{2}
Hays	Unincorporated place	Hamlet	Taber, MD of	196	150	+30.7%	1.51	129.8/km^{2}
Hayter	Unincorporated place	Hamlet	Provost No. 52, MD of	84	89	−5.6%	0.7	120.0/km^{2}
Herder	Unincorporated place	Locality	Red Deer County	78	65	+20.0%	0.57	136.8/km^{2}
Heritage Woods	Unincorporated place	—	Rocky View County	99	112	−11.6%	0.39	253.8/km^{2}
Hesketh	Unincorporated place	Hamlet	Kneehill County	10	10	0.0%	0.13	76.9/km^{2}
Hewitt Estates	Unincorporated place	Locality	Sturgeon County	149	174	−14.4%	1.23	121.1/km^{2}
High Point Estates	Unincorporated place	Locality	Rocky View County	84	122	−31.1%	0.36	233.3/km^{2}
Hilda	Unincorporated place	Hamlet	Cypress County	40	45	−11.1%	0.42	95.2/km^{2}
Hillcrest	Unincorporated place	Locality	Crowsnest Pass, Municipality of	640	597	+7.2%	0.51	1,254.9/km^{2}
Hu Haven	Unincorporated place	Locality	Sturgeon County	118	123	−4.1%	0.65	181.5/km^{2}
Hubbles Lake	Unincorporated place	Locality	Parkland County	221	197	+12.2%	1.29	171.3/km^{2}
Huxley	Unincorporated place	Hamlet	Kneehill County	75	75	0.0%	0.33	227.3/km^{2}
Indus	Unincorporated place	Hamlet	Rocky View County	36	42	−14.3%	0.78	46.2/km^{2}
Iron Springs	Unincorporated place	Hamlet	Lethbridge County	84	97	−13.4%	0.26	323.1/km^{2}
Islay	Unincorporated place	Hamlet	Vermilion River, County of	177	195	−9.2%	0.6	295.0/km^{2}
Janvier South	Unincorporated place	Hamlet	Wood Buffalo, RM of	61	100	−39.0%	5.01	12.2/km^{2}
Jarvie	Unincorporated place	Hamlet	Westlock County	103	87	+18.4%	0.48	214.6/km^{2}
Joffre	Unincorporated place	Hamlet	Lacombe County	128	171	−25.1%	0.21	609.5/km^{2}
Johnson's Addition	Unincorporated place	Hamlet	Taber, MD of	126	130	−3.1%	0.19	663.2/km^{2}
Josephburg	Unincorporated place	Hamlet	Strathcona County	127	123	+3.3%	2.47	51.4/km^{2}
Joussard	Unincorporated place	Hamlet	Big Lakes County	334	257	+30.0%	19.87	16.8/km^{2}
Kathyrn	Unincorporated place	Hamlet	Rocky View County	21	10	+110.0%	1.32	15.9/km^{2}
Kavanagh	Unincorporated place	Hamlet	Leduc County	39	47	−17.0%	0.33	118.2/km^{2}
Keephills	Unincorporated place	Hamlet	Parkland County	57	48	+18.8%	0.34	167.6/km^{2}
Kelsey	Unincorporated place	Hamlet	Camrose County	15	15	0.0%	0.45	33.3/km^{2}
Keoma	Unincorporated place	Hamlet	Rocky View County	95	94	+1.1%	0.24	395.8/km^{2}
Kikino part A (Note: One of two parts of Kikino Metis Settlement.)	Métis settlement	—	Smoky Lake County	978	934	+4.7%	440.92	2.2/km^{2}
Kikino part B (Note: One of two parts of Kikino Metis Settlement.)	Métis settlement	—	Lac La Biche County	0	0	NA	0.77	0.0/km^{2}
Kingman	Unincorporated place	Hamlet	Camrose County	78	103	−24.3%	0.43	181.4/km^{2}
Kinuso	Dissolved municipality	Hamlet	Big Lakes County	150	182	−17.6%	0.58	258.6/km^{2}
Kountry Meadows	Unincorporated place	Locality	Red Deer County	199	219	−9.1%	0.13	1,530.8/km^{2}
La Crete	Unincorporated place	Hamlet	Mackenzie County	3,856	3,396	+13.5%	17.61	219.0/km^{2}
La Glace	Unincorporated place	Hamlet	Grande Prairie No. 1, County of	179	211	−15.2%	0.81	221.0/km^{2}
Lac Des Arcs	Unincorporated place	Hamlet	Bighorn No. 8, MD of	146	130	+12.3%	0.57	256.1/km^{2}
Lac La Biche	Dissolved municipality	Hamlet	Lac La Biche County	3,120	3,320	−6.0%	68.39	45.6/km^{2}
Lake Newell Resort	Unincorporated place	Hamlet	Newell, County of	457	407	+12.3%	2.82	162.1/km^{2}
Langdon	Unincorporated place	Hamlet	Rocky View County	5,497	5,305	+3.6%	9.26	593.6/km^{2}
Les Trailer Park	Unincorporated place	Locality	Red Deer County	58	59	−1.7%	0.6	96.7/km^{2}
Leslieville	Unincorporated place	Hamlet	Clearwater County	134	151	−11.3%	0.52	257.7/km^{2}
Linn Valley	Unincorporated place	Hamlet	Red Deer County	218	213	+2.3%	0.67	325.4/km^{2}
Lodgepole	Unincorporated place	Hamlet	Brazeau County	117	116	+0.9%	1.74	67.2/km^{2}
Long Lake	Unincorporated place	Hamlet	Thorhild County	81	63	+28.6%	2.08	38.9/km^{2}
Looma	Unincorporated place	Hamlet	Leduc County	33	30	+10.0%	0.46	71.7/km^{2}
Lousana	Unincorporated place	Hamlet	Red Deer County	42	58	−27.6%	0.09	466.7/km^{2}
Lower Manor Estates	Unincorporated place	Locality	Sturgeon County	65	79	−17.7%	0.5	130.0/km^{2}
Lowland Heights	Unincorporated place	Hamlet	Pincher Creek No. 9, MD of	43	43	0.0%	0.44	97.7/km^{2}
Lundbreck	Unincorporated place	Hamlet	Pincher Creek No. 9, MD of	289	236	+22.5%	0.42	688.1/km^{2}
Lyalta	Unincorporated place	Hamlet	Wheatland County	480	344	+39.5%	1.74	275.9/km^{2}
MacKay	Unincorporated place	Locality	Yellowhead County	10	10	0.0%	0.02	500.0/km^{2}
Madden	Unincorporated place	Hamlet	Rocky View County	10	28	−64.3%	0.07	142.9/km^{2}
Mallaig	Unincorporated place	Hamlet	St. Paul No. 19, County of	210	207	+1.4%	0.6	350.0/km^{2}
Markerville	Unincorporated place	Hamlet	Red Deer County	38	45	−15.6%	0.17	223.5/km^{2}
Marlboro	Unincorporated place	Hamlet	Yellowhead County	97	114	−14.9%	0.29	334.5/km^{2}
Martins Trailer Court	Unincorporated place	Locality	Clearwater County	114	104	+9.6%	0.94	121.3/km^{2}
Maskwacis	Unincorporated place	Hamlet	Ponoka County	64	60	+6.7%	0.25	256.0/km^{2}
McDermott	Unincorporated place	Locality	Lethbridge County	54	72	−25.0%	1.29	41.9/km^{2}
Meanook	Unincorporated place	Hamlet	Athabasca County	35	30	+16.7%	0.6	58.3/km^{2}
Meeting Creek	Unincorporated place	Hamlet	Camrose County	0	39	−100.0%	0.54	0.0/km^{2}
Meso West	Unincorporated place	Locality	Parkland County	305	299	+2.0%	2.76	110.5/km^{2}
Minburn	Dissolved municipality	Hamlet	Minburn No. 27, County of	78	115	−32.2%	0.57	136.8/km^{2}
Mirror	Dissolved municipality	Hamlet	Lacombe County	481	502	−4.2%	2.3	209.1/km^{2}
Monarch	Unincorporated place	Hamlet	Lethbridge County	217	227	−4.4%	0.39	556.4/km^{2}
Moon River Estates	Unincorporated place	Hamlet	Willow Creek No. 26, MD of	145	126	+15.1%	1.5	96.7/km^{2}
Morningside	Unincorporated place	Hamlet	Lacombe County	85	97	−12.4%	0.25	340.0/km^{2}
Mountain View	Unincorporated place	Hamlet	Cardston County	87	90	−3.3%	1.24	70.2/km^{2}
Mulhurst Bay	Unincorporated place	Hamlet	Wetaskiwin No. 10, County of	447	431	+3.7%	4.36	102.5/km^{2}
Namaka	Unincorporated place	Hamlet	Wheatland County	72	85	−15.3%	0.31	232.3/km^{2}
Namao Ridge and Sturgeon View Estates	Unincorporated place	—	Sturgeon County	351	344	+2.0%	1.98	177.3/km^{2}
Nestow	Unincorporated place	Hamlet	Westlock County	5	10	−50.0%	0.05	100.0/km^{2}
Nevis	Unincorporated place	Hamlet	Stettler No. 6, County of	30	25	+20.0%	0.65	46.2/km^{2}
New Norway	Dissolved municipality	Hamlet	Camrose County	307	320	−4.1%	1.13	271.7/km^{2}
New Sarepta	Dissolved municipality	Hamlet	Leduc County	495	522	−5.2%	2.24	221.0/km^{2}
Newbrook	Unincorporated place	Hamlet	Thorhild County	63	92	−31.5%	0.52	121.2/km^{2}
Nightingale	Unincorporated place	Hamlet	Wheatland County	37	32	+15.6%	0.17	217.6/km^{2}
Niton Junction	Unincorporated place	Hamlet	Yellowhead County	88	70	+25.7%	1.04	84.6/km^{2}
North Cooking Lake	Unincorporated place	Hamlet	Strathcona County	20	31	−35.5%	0.41	48.8/km^{2}
Obed	Unincorporated place	Locality	Yellowhead County	34	10	+240.0%	0.67	50.7/km^{2}
Ohaton	Unincorporated place	Hamlet	Camrose County	133	128	+3.9%	0.13	1,023.1/km^{2}
Orton	Unincorporated place	Hamlet	Willow Creek No. 26, MD of	180	141	+27.7%	1.56	115.4/km^{2}
Osborne Acres	Unincorporated place	Locality	Parkland County	101	116	−12.9%	1.49	67.8/km^{2}
Paddle Prairie	Métis settlement	—	Northern Lights, County of	551	544	+1.3%	1,726.45	0.3/km^{2}
Panorama Heights	Unincorporated place	Locality	Parkland County	110	96	+14.6%	0.65	169.2/km^{2}
Parkland Village	Unincorporated place	Locality	Parkland County	1,479	1,934	−23.5%	0.73	2,026.0/km^{2}
Patricia	Unincorporated place	Hamlet	Newell, County of	78	101	−22.8%	0.59	132.2/km^{2}
Peavine	Métis settlement	—	Big Lakes County	387	607	−36.2%	798.95	0.5/km^{2}
Peerless Lake	Unincorporated place	Locality	Opportunity No. 17, MD of	429	334	+28.4%	11.03	38.9/km^{2}
Peers	Unincorporated place	Hamlet	Yellowhead County	91	98	−7.1%	0.9	101.1/km^{2}
Pelican Point	Unincorporated place	Hamlet	Camrose County	117	101	+15.8%	0.94	124.5/km^{2}
Perryvale	Unincorporated place	Hamlet	Athabasca County	10	20	−50.0%	0.39	25.6/km^{2}
Peterburn Estates	Unincorporated place	Locality	Parkland County	89	88	+1.1%	0.94	94.7/km^{2}
Pibroch	Unincorporated place	Hamlet	Westlock County	35	47	−25.5%	2.26	15.5/km^{2}
Pickardville	Unincorporated place	Hamlet	Westlock County	303	214	+41.6%	0.5	606.0/km^{2}
Pincher Station	Unincorporated place	Hamlet	Pincher Creek No. 9, MD of	26	25	+4.0%	0.5	52.0/km^{2}
Pine Shadows	Unincorporated place	Locality	Yellowhead County	127	155	−18.1%	0.61	208.2/km^{2}
Plamondon	Dissolved municipality	Hamlet	Lac La Biche County	303	416	−27.2%	9.65	31.4/km^{2}
Poplar Ridge (Note: Different from the Hamlet of Poplar Ridge in Brazeau County.)	Unincorporated place	Locality	Red Deer County	329	353	−6.8%	1.28	257.0/km^{2}
Prairie Lodge Trailer Court	Unincorporated place	Locality	Minburn No. 27, County of	5	40	−87.5%	0.28	17.9/km^{2}
Purple Springs	Unincorporated place	Hamlet	Taber, MD of	101	44	+129.5%	0.65	155.4/km^{2}
Radway	Unincorporated place	Hamlet	Thorhild County	231	171	+35.1%	0.59	391.5/km^{2}
Ralston	Unincorporated place	Locality	Cypress County	257	282	−8.9%	1	257.0/km^{2}
Ranfurly	Unincorporated place	Hamlet	Minburn No. 27, County of	71	56	+26.8%	0.72	98.6/km^{2}
Red Earth Creek	Unincorporated place	Hamlet	Opportunity No. 17, MD of	315	353	−10.8%	29.6	10.6/km^{2}
Red Willow	Unincorporated place	Hamlet	Stettler No. 6, County of	63	35	+80.0%	1.31	48.1/km^{2}
Redland	Unincorporated place	Hamlet	Wheatland County	20	15	+33.3%	0.14	142.9/km^{2}
Redwood Meadows	Unincorporated place	Townsite	Tsuut'ina 145	NA	1,053	NA	1.82	NA
Reno	Unincorporated place	Hamlet	Northern Sunrise County	20	20	0.0%	0.28	71.4/km^{2}
Riverview Pines Subdivision	Unincorporated place	Locality	Grande Prairie No. 1, County of	86	125	−31.2%	0.97	88.7/km^{2}
Rivière Qui Barre	Unincorporated place	Hamlet	Sturgeon County	91	15	+506.7%	0.58	156.9/km^{2}
Robb	Unincorporated place	Hamlet	Yellowhead County	144	170	−15.3%	6.82	21.1/km^{2}
Rochester	Unincorporated place	Hamlet	Athabasca County	72	79	−8.9%	3.17	22.7/km^{2}
Rolling Heights	Unincorporated place	Locality	Parkland County	139	132	+5.3%	0.95	146.3/km^{2}
Rolling Hills	Unincorporated place	Hamlet	Newell, County of	273	258	+5.8%	0.69	395.7/km^{2}
Rolling Meadows	Unincorporated place	Locality	Parkland County	67	75	−10.7%	0.68	98.5/km^{2}
Rolly View	Unincorporated place	Hamlet	Leduc County	71	71	0.0%	0.71	100.0/km^{2}
Rosebud	Unincorporated place	Hamlet	Wheatland County	112	87	+28.7%	0.73	153.4/km^{2}
Round Hill	Unincorporated place	Hamlet	Camrose County	125	129	−3.1%	2.59	48.3/km^{2}
Sandy Lake	Unincorporated place	Hamlet	Opportunity No. 17, MD of	163	121	+34.7%	13.25	12.3/km^{2}
Sangudo	Dissolved municipality	Hamlet	Lac Ste. Anne County	298	299	−0.3%	2.8	106.4/km^{2}
Saprae Creek	Unincorporated place	Hamlet	Wood Buffalo, RM of	508	572	−11.2%	3.6	141.1/km^{2}
Scandia	Unincorporated place	Hamlet	Newell, County of	169	146	+15.8%	0.19	889.5/km^{2}
Schuler	Unincorporated place	Hamlet	Cypress County	86	72	+19.4%	0.6	143.3/km^{2}
Seven Persons	Unincorporated place	Hamlet	Cypress County	277	275	+0.7%	1.05	263.8/km^{2}
Shaftsbury Settlement (Note: Mistakenly spelled Shaftsbury Settlement by Statistics Canada.)	Unincorporated place	Locality	Peace No. 135, MD of	182	291	−37.5%	21.82	8.3/km^{2}
Shaughnessy	Unincorporated place	Hamlet	Lethbridge County	388	415	−6.5%	0.38	1,021.1/km^{2}
Smith	Unincorporated place	Hamlet	Lesser Slave River No. 124, MD of	227	148	+53.4%	2.42	93.8/km^{2}
South Cooking Lake	Unincorporated place	Hamlet	Strathcona County	288	241	+19.5%	2.31	124.7/km^{2}
Speargrass	Unincorporated place	—	Wheatland County	275	269	+2.2%	0.77	357.1/km^{2}
Springbrook	Unincorporated place	Hamlet	Red Deer County	1,534	1,507	+1.8%	5.26	291.6/km^{2}
Spruce Lane Acres	Unincorporated place	Locality	Red Deer County	92	100	−8.0%	0.37	248.6/km^{2}
Spruce View	Unincorporated place	Hamlet	Red Deer County	138	175	−21.1%	0.69	200.0/km^{2}
St Isidore	Unincorporated place	Hamlet	Northern Sunrise County	236	266	−11.3%	1.08	218.5/km^{2}
Strome	Dissolved municipality	Hamlet	Flagstaff County	232	260	−10.8%	0.91	254.9/km^{2}
Suffield	Unincorporated place	Hamlet	Cypress County	190	255	−25.5%	0.86	220.9/km^{2}
Sunnybrook	Unincorporated place	Hamlet	Leduc County	50	59	−15.3%	0.31	161.3/km^{2}
Sunnyslope	Unincorporated place	Hamlet	Kneehill County	28	36	−22.2%	0.17	164.7/km^{2}
Sunset Acres	Unincorporated place	Locality	Lethbridge County	60	57	+5.3%	0.17	352.9/km^{2}
Sunset View Acres	Unincorporated place	Locality	Parkland County	98	102	−3.9%	0.69	142.0/km^{2}
Swalwell	Unincorporated place	Hamlet	Kneehill County	93	95	−2.1%	0.41	226.8/km^{2}
Tawatinaw	Unincorporated place	Hamlet	Westlock County	15	5	+200.0%	0.13	115.4/km^{2}
Tees	Unincorporated place	Hamlet	Lacombe County	73	73	0.0%	0.11	663.6/km^{2}
Telfordville	Unincorporated place	Hamlet	Leduc County	35	20	+75.0%	0.4	87.5/km^{2}
Thorhild	Dissolved municipality	Hamlet	Thorhild County	391	531	−26.4%	1.69	231.4/km^{2}
Tilley	Dissolved municipality	Hamlet	Newell, County of	318	364	−12.6%	0.69	460.9/km^{2}
Tillicum Beach	Unincorporated place	Hamlet	Camrose County	130	193	−32.6%	0.4	325.0/km^{2}
Tomahawk	Unincorporated place	Hamlet	Parkland County	113	99	+14.1%	1.53	73.9/km^{2}
Torrington	Unincorporated place	Hamlet	Kneehill County	306	201	+52.2%	0.4	765.0/km^{2}
Triple-L-Trailer Court	Unincorporated place	Locality	Grande Prairie No. 1, County of	275	134	+105.2%	0.2	1,375.0/km^{2}
Trout Lake	Unincorporated place	Locality	Opportunity No. 17, MD of	330	349	−5.4%	5.25	62.9/km^{2}
Turin	Unincorporated place	Hamlet	Lethbridge County	72	119	−39.5%	0.28	257.1/km^{2}
Twin Butte	Unincorporated place	Hamlet	Pincher Creek No. 9, MD of	10	10	0.0%	0.17	58.8/km^{2}
Upper and Lower Viscount Estates	Unincorporated place	Locality	Sturgeon County	120	214	−43.9%	0.57	210.5/km^{2}
Upper Manor Estates	Unincorporated place	Locality	Sturgeon County	718	656	+9.5%	1.75	410.3/km^{2}
Valhalla Centre	Unincorporated place	Hamlet	Grande Prairie No. 1, County of	40	15	+166.7%	1.22	32.8/km^{2}
Veinerville	Unincorporated place	Hamlet	Cypress County	70	83	−15.7%	0.18	388.9/km^{2}
Villeneuve	Unincorporated place	Hamlet	Sturgeon County	260	238	+9.2%	0.33	787.9/km^{2}
Vimy	Unincorporated place	Hamlet	Westlock County	183	198	−7.6%	0.53	345.3/km^{2}
Wabasca-Desmarais	Unincorporated place	Hamlet	Opportunity No. 17, MD of	1,594	1,480	+7.7%	101.55	15.7/km^{2}
Walsh	Unincorporated place	Hamlet	Cypress County	50	60	−16.7%	1.22	41.0/km^{2}
Wanham	Unincorporated place	Hamlet	Birch Hills County	141	124	+13.7%	0.98	143.9/km^{2}
Warspite	Unincorporated place	Hamlet	Smoky Lake County	70	76	−7.9%	0.78	89.7/km^{2}
Waterton Park	Unincorporated place	Hamlet	ID No. 4	158	105	+50.5%	482.54	0.3/km^{2}
Wedgewood	Unincorporated place	Hamlet	Grande Prairie No. 1, County of	752	753	−0.1%	0.53	1,418.9/km^{2}
Weslake Estates	Unincorporated place	Locality	Parkland County	133	122	+9.0%	0.78	170.5/km^{2}
Westbrooke Crescents	Unincorporated place	Locality	Parkland County	238	224	+6.3%	2.47	96.4/km^{2}
Whitelaw	Unincorporated place	Hamlet	Fairview No. 136, MD of	110	125	−12.0%	0.64	171.9/km^{2}
Widewater	Unincorporated place	Hamlet	Lesser Slave River No. 124, MD of	405	392	+3.3%	3.69	109.8/km^{2}
Wildwood	Unincorporated place	Hamlet	Yellowhead County	257	273	−5.9%	0.54	475.9/km^{2}
Willingdon	Dissolved municipality	Hamlet	Two Hills No. 21, County of	249	319	−21.9%	0.92	270.7/km^{2}
Wimborne	Unincorporated place	Hamlet	Kneehill County	15	20	−25.0%	0.16	93.8/km^{2}
Winfield	Unincorporated place	Hamlet	Wetaskiwin No. 10, County of	193	238	−18.9%	1.07	180.4/km^{2}
Woking	Unincorporated place	Hamlet	Saddle Hills County	62	102	−39.2%	0.55	112.7/km^{2}
Woodbend Crescent	Unincorporated place	Locality	Parkland County	100	74	+35.1%	0.72	138.9/km^{2}
Woodland Hills	Unincorporated place	Locality	Red Deer County	155	149	+4.0%	0.61	254.1/km^{2}
Woodland Park	Unincorporated place	Locality	Parkland County	211	246	−14.2%	2.21	95.5/km^{2}
Zama City	Unincorporated place	Hamlet	Mackenzie County	52	74	−29.7%	21.68	2.4/km^{2}
Total designated places	—	—	—	78,571	79,189	−0.8%	6,313.26	12.4/km^{2}
Province of Alberta	—	—	—	4,262,635	4,067,175	+4.8%	634,658.27	6.7/km^{2}

== Retired designated places ==
T & E Trailer Park, located within the City of Grande Prairie, was last recognized as a designated place in the 2006 Census of Canada.

== See also ==
- List of census agglomerations in Alberta
- List of census divisions of Alberta
- List of communities in Alberta
- List of hamlets in Alberta
- List of localities in Alberta
- List of municipalities in Alberta
- List of population centres in Alberta
