= Sunset View Acres, Alberta =

Sunset View Acres
- Designated place
- Location of Sunset View Acres Sunset View Acres (Canada)
- Coordinates: 53.450°N 113.744°W
- Country: Canada
- Province: Alberta
- Region: Edmonton Metropolitan Region
- Census division: 11
- Municipal district: Parkland County

Government
  - Type: Unincorporated
  - Governing body: Parkland County Council

Area (2021)
  - Land: 0.69 km^{2} (0.27 sq mi)

Population (2021)
  - Total: 98
  - Density: 141.7/km^{2} (367/sq mi)
- Time zone: UTC−06:00 (Alberta Time)
- Area codes: 780, 587, 825

Sunset View Acres is an unincorporated community in Alberta, Canada within Parkland County that is recognized as a designated place by Statistics Canada. It is located on the south side of Highway 627, 0.8 km (0.50 mi) east of Highway 60. It is adjacent to the designated place of Birch Hill Park to the south.

== Demographics ==
In the 2021 Census of Population conducted by Statistics Canada, Sunset View Acres had a population of 98 living in 35 of its 37 total private dwellings, a change of −3.9% from its 2016 population of 102. With a land area of 0.69 km^{2} (0.27 sq mi), it had a population density of 142.0/km^{2} (367.9/sq mi) in 2021.

As a designated place in the 2016 Census of Population conducted by Statistics Canada, Sunset View Acres had a population of 102 living in 36 of its 37 total private dwellings, a change of 5.2% from its 2011 population of 97. With a land area of 0.48 km^{2} (0.19 sq mi), it had a population density of 212.5/km^{2} (550.4/sq mi) in 2016.

== See also ==
- List of communities in Alberta
- List of designated places in Alberta
