= Winfield Heights, Alberta =

Winfield Heights, Alberta may refer to:

- Winfield Heights, Parkland County, Alberta, a locality in Parkland County, Alberta
- Winfield Heights, Strathcona County, a locality in Strathcona County, Alberta
