= Birch Hill Park, Alberta =

Birch Hill Park
- Designated place
- Location of Birch Hill Park Birch Hill Park (Canada)
- Coordinates: 53.443°N 113.738°W
- Country: Canada
- Province: Alberta
- Region: Edmonton Metropolitan Region
- Census division: 11
- Municipal district: Parkland County

Government
  - Type: Unincorporated
  - Governing body: Parkland County Council

Area (2021)
  - Land: 0.43 km^{2} (0.17 sq mi)

Population (2021)
  - Total: 112
  - Density: 258.5/km^{2} (670/sq mi)
- Time zone: UTC−06:00 (Alberta Time)
- Area codes: 780, 587, 825

Birch Hill Park is an unincorporated community in Alberta, Canada within Parkland County that is recognized as a designated place by Statistics Canada. It is located on the west side of Range Road 262, 0.8 km (0.50 mi) south of Highway 627. It is adjacent to the designated place of Sunset View Acres to the north.

== Demographics ==
In the 2021 Census of Population conducted by Statistics Canada, Birch Hill Park had a population of 112 living in 39 of its 40 total private dwellings, a change of 4.7% from its 2016 population of 107. With a land area of 0.43 km^{2} (0.17 sq mi), it had a population density of 260.5/km^{2} (674.6/sq mi) in 2021.

As a designated place in the 2016 Census of Population conducted by Statistics Canada, Birch Hill Park had a population of 107 living in 39 of its 39 total private dwellings, a change of −7% from its 2011 population of 115. With a land area of 0.43 km^{2} (0.17 sq mi), it had a population density of 248.8/km^{2} (644.5/sq mi) in 2016.

== See also ==
- List of communities in Alberta
- List of designated places in Alberta
