= Parkland Village =

- Locality
- Location within Parkland County Location within Alberta
- Coordinates: 53.580°N 113.893°W
- Country: Canada
- Province: Alberta
- Municipal district: Parkland County

Government
  - Type: Unincorporated
  - Mayor: Allan Gamble
  - Governing body: Parkland County Council: Natalie Birnie; Allan William Hoefsloot; Phyllis Kobasiuk; Kristina Kowalski; Sally Kucher Johnson; Rob Wiedeman

Area (2021)
  - Land: 0.73 km^{2} (0.28 sq mi)

Population (2021)
  - Total: 1,479
  - Density: 2,015.5/km^{2} (5,220/sq mi)
- Time zone: UTC−06:00 (Alberta Time)
- Area codes: 780, 587, 825

Parkland Village is an unincorporated community in Alberta, Canada within Parkland County. It was previously recognized as a designated place by Statistics Canada in the 2001 Census of Canada. It is located on Range Road 272, 0.8 km (0.50 mi) north of Highway 16 (Yellowhead Highway) and the City of Spruce Grove.

== Demographics ==
Population history of Parkland Village
Year	Pop.	±%
1991	651	—
1996	1,247	+91.6%
2001	1,401	+12.3%
2006	1,525	+8.9%
2016	1,934	+26.8%
2021	1,479	−23.5%
Source: Statistics Canada

In the 2021 Census of Population conducted by Statistics Canada, Parkland Village had a population of 1,479 living in 674 of its 704 total private dwellings, a change of −23.5% from its 2016 population of 1,934. With a land area of 0.73 km^{2} (0.28 sq mi), it had a population density of 2,026.0/km^{2} (5,247.4/sq mi) in 2021.

== Education ==
Parkland Village is home to Parkland Village School. Administered by Parkland School Division No. 70, the school offers instruction to students in kindergarten through grade six. Its catchment area includes Parkland Village, nearby Acheson and surrounding rural areas of Parkland County. The school has a student population of 182.

== See also ==
- List of communities in Alberta
- List of designated places in Alberta
