= Dawn Valley, Alberta =

Dawn Valley
- Designated place
- Location of Dawn Valley Dawn Valley (Canada)
- Coordinates: 53.631°N 114.020°W
- Country: Canada
- Province: Alberta
- Region: Edmonton Metropolitan Region
- Census division: 11
- Municipal district: Parkland County

Government
  - Type: Unincorporated
  - Governing body: Parkland County Council

Area (2021)
  - Land: 1.21 km^{2} (0.47 sq mi)

Population (2021)
  - Total: 173
  - Density: 142.8/km^{2} (370/sq mi)
- Time zone: UTC−06:00 (Alberta Time)
- Area codes: 780, 587, 825

Dawn Valley is an unincorporated community in Alberta, Canada within Parkland County that is recognized as a designated place by Statistics Canada. It is located on the south side of Township Road 540, 0.8 km (0.50 mi) west of Highway 779.

== Demographics ==
In the 2021 Census of Population conducted by Statistics Canada, Dawn Valley had a population of 173 living in 57 of its 58 total private dwellings, a change of −6.5% from its 2016 population of 185. With a land area of 1.21 km^{2} (0.47 sq mi), it had a population density of 143.0/km^{2} (370.3/sq mi) in 2021.

As a designated place in the 2016 Census of Population conducted by Statistics Canada, Dawn Valley had a population of 185 living in 58 of its 58 total private dwellings, a change of −8.4% from its 2011 population of 202. With a land area of 1.21 km^{2} (0.47 sq mi), it had a population density of 152.9/km^{2} (396.0/sq mi) in 2016.

== See also ==
- List of communities in Alberta
- List of designated places in Alberta
