= Green Acre Estates, Alberta =

Green Acre Estates
- Designated place
- Location of Green Acre Estates Green Acre Estates (Canada)
- Coordinates: 53.497°N 113.940°W
- Country: Canada
- Province: Alberta
- Region: Edmonton Metropolitan Region
- Census division: 11
- Municipal district: Parkland County

Government
  - Type: Unincorporated
  - Governing body: Parkland County Council

Area (2021)
  - Land: 1.39 km^{2} (0.54 sq mi)

Population (2021)
  - Total: 137
  - Density: 98.8/km^{2} (256/sq mi)
- Time zone: UTC−06:00 (Alberta Time)
- Area codes: 780, 587, 825

Green Acre Estates is an unincorporated community in Alberta, Canada within Parkland County that is recognized as a designated place by Statistics Canada. It is located on the west side of Range Road 274, 1.6 km (0.99 mi) south of Highway 628. It is adjacent to the Town of Stony Plain to the northwest and the designated place of Garden Grove Estates to the south.

== Demographics ==
In the 2021 Census of Population conducted by Statistics Canada, Green Acre Estates had a population of 137 living in 50 of its 50 total private dwellings, a change of −8.1% from its 2016 population of 149. With a land area of 1.39 km^{2} (0.54 sq mi), it had a population density of 98.6/km^{2} (255.3/sq mi) in 2021.

As a designated place in the 2016 Census of Population conducted by Statistics Canada, Green Acre Estates had a population of 149 living in 50 of its 50 total private dwellings, a change of −2% from its 2011 population of 152. With a land area of 1.36 km^{2} (0.53 sq mi), it had a population density of 109.6/km^{2} (283.8/sq mi) in 2016.

== See also ==
- List of communities in Alberta
- List of designated places in Alberta
