= Garden Grove Estates, Alberta =

Garden Grove Estates
- Designated place
- Location of Garden Grove Estates Garden Grove Estates (Canada)
- Coordinates: 53.490°N 113.948°W
- Country: Canada
- Province: Alberta
- Region: Edmonton Metropolitan Region
- Census division: 11
- Municipal district: Parkland County

Government
  - Type: Unincorporated
  - Governing body: Parkland County Council

Area (2021)
  - Land: 1.99 km^{2} (0.77 sq mi)

Population (2021)
  - Total: 283
  - Density: 142/km^{2} (370/sq mi)
- Time zone: UTC−06:00 (Alberta Time)
- Area codes: 780, 587, 825

Garden Grove Estates is an unincorporated community in Alberta, Canada within Parkland County that is recognized as a designated place by Statistics Canada. It is located on the east side of Range Road 275, 2.4 km (1.5 mi) south of Highway 628. It is adjacent to the designated places of Green Acre Estates to the north and Peterburn Estates to the northwest.

== Demographics ==
In the 2021 Census of Population conducted by Statistics Canada, Garden Grove Estates had a population of 283 living in 98 of its 98 total private dwellings, a change of 0.4% from its 2016 population of 282. With a land area of 1.99 km^{2} (0.77 sq mi), it had a population density of 142.2/km^{2} (368.3/sq mi) in 2021.

As a designated place in the 2016 Census of Population conducted by Statistics Canada, Garden Grove Estates had a population of 282 living in 95 of its 95 total private dwellings, a change of −1.1% from its 2011 population of 285. With a land area of 2 km^{2} (0.77 sq mi), it had a population density of 141.0/km^{2} (365.2/sq mi) in 2016.

== See also ==
- List of communities in Alberta
- List of designated places in Alberta
