= Devonshire Meadows, Alberta =

Devonshire Meadows
- Designated place
- Location of Devonshire Meadows Devonshire Meadows (Canada)
- Coordinates: 53.389°N 113.831°W
- Country: Canada
- Province: Alberta
- Region: Edmonton Metropolitan Region
- Census division: 11
- Municipal district: Parkland County

Government
  - Type: Unincorporated
  - Governing body: Parkland County Council

Area (2021)
  - Land: 2.08 km^{2} (0.80 sq mi)

Population (2021)
  - Total: 137
  - Density: 65.8/km^{2} (170/sq mi)
- Time zone: UTC−06:00 (Alberta Time)
- Area codes: 780, 587, 825

Devonshire Meadows is an unincorporated community in Alberta, Canada within Parkland County that is recognized as a designated place by Statistics Canada. It is located on the north side of Township Road 511, 4 km (2.5 mi) west of Highway 60.

== Demographics ==
In the 2021 Census of Population conducted by Statistics Canada, Devonshire Meadows had a population of 137 living in 52 of its 52 total private dwellings, a change of 0.7% from its 2016 population of 136. With a land area of 2.08 km^{2} (0.80 sq mi), it had a population density of 65.9/km^{2} (170.6/sq mi) in 2021.

As a designated place in the 2016 Census of Population conducted by Statistics Canada, Devonshire Meadows had a population of 136 living in 48 of its 50 total private dwellings, a change of −7.5% from its 2011 population of 147. With a land area of 1.38 km^{2} (0.53 sq mi), it had a population density of 98.6/km^{2} (255.2/sq mi) in 2016.

== See also ==
- List of communities in Alberta
- List of designated places in Alberta
