= Fleming Park, Alberta =

Fleming Park
- Designated place
- Location of Fleming Park Fleming Park (Canada)
- Coordinates: 53.443°N 113.719°W
- Country: Canada
- Province: Alberta
- Region: Edmonton Metropolitan Region
- Census division: 11
- Municipal district: Parkland County

Government
  - Type: Unincorporated
  - Governing body: Parkland County Council

Area (2021)
  - Land: 0.73 km^{2} (0.28 sq mi)

Population (2021)
  - Total: 103
  - Density: 141.4/km^{2} (366/sq mi)
- Time zone: UTC−06:00 (Alberta Time)
- Area codes: 780, 587, 825

Fleming Park is an unincorporated community in Alberta, Canada within Parkland County that is recognized as a designated place by Statistics Canada. It is located on the west side of Range Road 261, 0.8 km (0.50 mi) south of Highway 627.

== Demographics ==
In the 2021 Census of Population conducted by Statistics Canada, Fleming Park had a population of 103 living in 39 of its 39 total private dwellings, a change of −6.4% from its 2016 population of 110. With a land area of 0.73 km^{2} (0.28 sq mi), it had a population density of 141.1/km^{2} (365.4/sq mi) in 2021.

As a designated place in the 2016 Census of Population conducted by Statistics Canada, Fleming Park had a population of 110 living in 39 of its 39 total private dwellings, a change of −9.1% from its 2011 population of 121. With a land area of 0.54 km^{2} (0.21 sq mi), it had a population density of 203.7/km^{2} (527.6/sq mi) in 2016.

== See also ==
- List of communities in Alberta
- List of designated places in Alberta
