= Woodland Park, Alberta (disambiguation) =

Woodland Park, Alberta is a designated place and locality in Parkland County, Alberta.

Woodland Park, Alberta may also refer to:

- Woodland Park, Ponoka County, Alberta, a locality in Ponoka County, Alberta
- Woodland Park, Strathcona County, a locality in Strathcona County, Alberta
