= Haynes, Alberta =

Haynes
- Hamlet
- Location of Haynes Haynes (Canada)
- Coordinates: 52°19′08″N 113°23′33″W
- Country: Canada
- Province: Alberta
- Region: Central Alberta
- Census division: 8
- Municipal district: Lacombe County

Government
  - Type: Unincorporated
  - Governing body: Lacombe County Council

Area (2021)
  - Land: 0.27 km^{2} (0.10 sq mi)

Population (2021)
  - Total: 15
  - Density: 55.6/km^{2} (144/sq mi)
- Time zone: UTC−06:00 (Alberta Time)
- Area codes: 403, 587, 825

Haynes is a hamlet in central Alberta, Canada within Lacombe County. It is located 3 kilometres (1.9 mi) north of Highway 11, approximately 28 kilometres (17 mi) east of Red Deer.

The hamlet takes its name from nearby Haynes Creek.

== Demographics ==
Population history of Haynes
Year	Pop.	±%
1981	26	—
1986	27	+3.8%
1991	30	+11.1%
1996	39	+30.0%
2001	25	−35.9%
2006	25	+0.0%
2011	15	−40.0%
2016	20	+33.3%
2021	15	−25.0%
Source: Statistics Canada

In the 2021 Census of Population conducted by Statistics Canada, Haynes had a population of 15 living in 8 of its 11 total private dwellings, a change of −25% from its 2016 population of 20. With a land area of 0.27 km^{2} (0.10 sq mi), it had a population density of 55.6/km^{2} (143.9/sq mi) in 2021.

As a designated place in the 2016 Census of Population conducted by Statistics Canada, Haynes had a population of 20 living in 8 of its 12 total private dwellings, a change of 33.3% from its 2011 population of 15. With a land area of 0.27 km^{2} (0.10 sq mi), it had a population density of 74.1/km^{2} (191.9/sq mi) in 2016.

== See also ==
- List of communities in Alberta
- List of designated places in Alberta
- List of hamlets in Alberta
