= Peterburn Estates, Alberta =

Peterburn Estates
- Designated place
- Location of Peterburn Estates Peterburn Estates (Canada)
- Coordinates: 53.490°N 113.965°W
- Country: Canada
- Province: Alberta
- Region: Edmonton Metropolitan Region
- Census division: 11
- Municipal district: Parkland County

Government
  - Type: Unincorporated
  - Governing body: Parkland County Council

Area (2021)
  - Land: 0.94 km^{2} (0.36 sq mi)

Population (2021)
  - Total: 89
  - Density: 94.9/km^{2} (246/sq mi)
- Time zone: UTC−06:00 (Alberta Time)
- Area codes: 780, 587, 825

Peterburn Estates is an unincorporated community in Alberta, Canada within Parkland County that is recognized as a designated place by Statistics Canada. It is located on the west side of Range Road 275, 1.6 km (0.99 mi) south of Highway 628. It is adjacent to the Town of Stony Plain to the northwest and the designated place of Garden Grove Estates to the southeast.

== Demographics ==
In the 2021 Census of Population conducted by Statistics Canada, Peterburn Estates had a population of 89 living in 36 of its 37 total private dwellings, a change of 1.1% from its 2016 population of 88. With a land area of 0.94 km^{2} (0.36 sq mi), it had a population density of 94.7/km^{2} (245.2/sq mi) in 2021.

As a designated place in the 2016 Census of Population conducted by Statistics Canada, Peterburn Estates had a population of 88 living in 35 of its 37 total private dwellings, a change of −9.3% from its 2011 population of 97. With a land area of 0.94 km^{2} (0.36 sq mi), it had a population density of 93.6/km^{2} (242.5/sq mi) in 2016.

== See also ==
- List of communities in Alberta
- List of designated places in Alberta
