= Sundance Power Plant, Alberta =

Sundance Power Plant
- Designated place
- Location of Sundance Power Plant Sundance Power Plant (Canada)
- Coordinates: 53.509°N 114.558°W
- Country: Canada
- Province: Alberta
- Region: Edmonton Metropolitan Region
- Census division: 11
- Municipal district: Parkland County

Government
  - Type: Unincorporated
  - Governing body: Parkland County Council

Area
  - Land: 0.78 km^{2} (0.30 sq mi)

Population (2016)
  - Total: 0
- Time zone: UTC−06:00 (Alberta Time)
- Area codes: 780, 587, 825

Sundance Power Plant is an unincorporated community in Alberta, Canada within Parkland County that is recognized as a designated place by Statistics Canada. It is located on the south side of Township Road 524A (Sundance Road), 6 km (3.7 mi) north of Highway 627.

== Demographics ==
As a designated place in the 2016 Census of Population conducted by Statistics Canada, Sundance Power Plant recorded a population of 0 living in 0 of its 0 total private dwellings, no change from its 2011 population of 0. With a land area of 0.78 km^{2} (0.30 sq mi), it had a population density of 0.0/km^{2} (0.0/sq mi) in 2016.

As a designated place in the 2011 Census, Sundance Power Plant had a population of 0 living in 0 of its 0 total dwellings, a 0% change from its 2006 population of 0. With a land area of 0.79 km^{2} (0.31 sq mi), it had a population density of 0.0/km^{2} (0.0/sq mi) in 2011.

== See also ==
- List of communities in Alberta
