= Woodbend Crescent, Alberta =

Woodbend Crescent
- Designated place
- Location of Woodbend Crescent Woodbend Crescent (Canada)
- Coordinates: 53.429°N 113.732°W
- Country: Canada
- Province: Alberta
- Region: Edmonton Metropolitan Region
- Census division: 11
- Municipal district: Parkland County

Government
  - Type: Unincorporated
  - Governing body: Parkland County Council

Area (2021)
  - Land: 0.72 km^{2} (0.28 sq mi)

Population (2021)
  - Total: 100
  - Density: 138.9/km^{2} (360/sq mi)
- Time zone: UTC−06:00 (Alberta Time)
- Area codes: 780, 587, 825

Woodbend Crescent is an unincorporated community in Alberta, Canada within Parkland County that is recognized as a designated place by Statistics Canada. It is located on the north side of Township Road 514, 1.6 km (0.99 mi) east of Highway 60.

== Demographics ==
In the 2021 Census of Population conducted by Statistics Canada, Woodbend Crescent had a population of 100 living in 35 of its 36 total private dwellings, a change of 35.1% from its 2016 population of 74. With a land area of 0.72 km^{2} (0.28 sq mi), it had a population density of 138.9/km^{2} (359.7/sq mi) in 2021.

As a designated place in the 2016 Census of Population conducted by Statistics Canada, Woodbend Crescent had a population of 74 living in 26 of its 27 total private dwellings, a change of −28.8% from its 2011 population of 104. With a land area of 0.72 km^{2} (0.28 sq mi), it had a population density of 102.8/km^{2} (266.2/sq mi) in 2016.

== See also ==
- List of communities in Alberta
- List of designated places in Alberta
