= Rolling Heights =

- Designated place
- Location of Rolling Heights Rolling Heights (Canada)
- Coordinates: 53.639°N 113.992°W
- Country: Canada
- Province: Alberta
- Region: Southern Alberta
- Census division: 2
- Municipal district: Parkland County

Government
  - Type: Unincorporated
  - Governing body: Parkland County Council

Area (2021)
  - Land: 0.95 km^{2} (0.37 sq mi)

Population (2021)
  - Total: 139
  - Density: 145.9/km^{2} (378/sq mi)
- Time zone: UTC−06:00 (Alberta Time)
- Area codes: 780, 587, 825

Rolling Heights is an unincorporated community in Alberta, Canada within Parkland County that is recognized as a designated place by Statistics Canada. It is located on the east side of Highway 779, 7 km (4.3 mi) north of Highway 16.

== Demographics ==
In the 2021 Census of Population conducted by Statistics Canada, Rolling Heights had a population of 139 living in 40 of its 42 total private dwellings, a change of 5.3% from its 2016 population of 132. With a land area of 0.95 km^{2} (0.37 sq mi), it had a population density of 146.3/km^{2} (379.0/sq mi) in 2021.

As a designated place in the 2016 Census of Population conducted by Statistics Canada, Rolling Heights had a population of 132 living in 38 of its 38 total private dwellings, a change of −5% from its 2011 population of 139. With a land area of 0.64 km^{2} (0.25 sq mi), it had a population density of 206.3/km^{2} (534.2/sq mi) in 2016.

== See also ==
- List of communities in Alberta
- List of designated places in Alberta
