= Panorama Heights =

Panorama Heights may refer to:

- Panorama Heights, Alberta, Canada
- Panorama Heights, California, United States
