= Hubbles Lake, Alberta =

Hubbles Lake
- Designated place
- Location of Hubbles Lake Hubbles Lake (Canada)
- Coordinates: 53.560°N 114.088°W
- Country: Canada
- Province: Alberta
- Region: Edmonton Metropolitan Region
- Census division: 11
- Municipal district: Parkland County

Government
  - Type: Unincorporated
  - Governing body: Parkland County Council

Area (2021)
  - Land: 1.29 km^{2} (0.50 sq mi)

Population (2021)
  - Total: 221
  - Density: 171.4/km^{2} (444/sq mi)
- Time zone: UTC−06:00 (Alberta Time)
- Area codes: 780, 587, 825

Hubbles Lake is an unincorporated community in Alberta, Canada within Parkland County that is recognized as a designated place by Statistics Canada. It is located on the west side of Range Road 264, 1.0 km (0.62 mi) south of Highway 16.

== Demographics ==
In the 2021 Census of Population conducted by Statistics Canada, Hubbles Lake had a population of 221 living in 88 of its 91 total private dwellings, a change of 12.2% from its 2016 population of 197. With a land area of 1.29 km^{2} (0.50 sq mi), it had a population density of 171.3/km^{2} (443.7/sq mi) in 2021.

As a designated place in the 2016 Census of Population conducted by Statistics Canada, Hubbles Lake had a population of 192 living in 76 of its 83 total private dwellings, a change of −3% from its 2011 population of 198. With a land area of 0.99 km^{2} (0.38 sq mi), it had a population density of 193.9/km^{2} (502.3/sq mi) in 2016.

== See also ==
- List of communities in Alberta
- List of designated places in Alberta
