= Alberta Highway 627 =

Highway in Alberta, Canada

Highway 627
- Garden Valley Road; Maskêkosihk Trail
- Highway 627 highlighted in red

Route information
- Maintained by Alberta Transportation
- Length: 69.8 km (43.4 mi)

Major junctions
- West end: Highway 759 near Tomahawk
- Highway 777 near Carvel; Highway 779 near Stony Plain; Highway 60 near Devon
- East end: Edmonton city limits

Location
- Country: Canada
- Province: Alberta
- Specialized and rural municipalities: Parkland County
- Major cities: Edmonton

Highway system
- Alberta Provincial Highway Network; List; Former
← Highway 626	→ Highway 628

Highway 627 runs west to east through rural parts of Parkland County, beginning at Highway 759 about 12 km (7.5 mi) south of Seba Beach and heads due east. The Parkland County portion is also known as Garden Valley Road, taking this name from Garden Valley Community Hall at the corner of Range Road 274. It takes the name Maskêkosihk Trail (/mʌsˈkeɪɡoʊsiː/) as it enters Edmonton at 215 Street/Winterburn Road, before terminating at Anthony Henday Drive. Portions of 23 Avenue and 184 Street NW between Winterburn Road and Anthony Henday Drive were renamed Maskêkosihk Trail in February 2016 to honour Cree heritage.

== Major intersections ==
Starting from the west end of Highway 627:

Location	km	mi	Destinations	Notes
Parkland County	0.0	0.0	Highway 759 – Seba Beach, Tomahawk	Highway 627 western terminus
Parkland County	25.5	15.8	Rose Valley Road (Range Road 32A) – Keephills	
Parkland County	34.5	21.4	Highway 770 – Onoway, Carvel, Genesee	
Parkland County	39.3	24.4	Range Road 20 – Spring Lake	
Parkland County	49.1	30.5	Highway 779 north / Range Road 20 south – Stony Plain	
Parkland County	55.2	34.3	Golden Spike Road (Range Road 273) – Spruce Grove	Former Highway 788 north
Parkland County	64.9	40.3	Highway 60 (Devonian Way) – Acheson, Devon	
Parkland County–Edmonton boundary	69.8 0.0	43.4 0.0	Winterburn Road (215 Street)	Highway 627 eastern terminus; Maskêkosihk Trail western terminus
Edmonton	1.6	0.99	199 Street / Richard Rice Boulevard	
Edmonton	4.4	2.7	Anthony Henday Drive (Highway 216) / Cameron Heights Drive	Interchange; Highway 216 exit 12; continues as Cameron Heights Drive
1.000 mi = 1.609 km; 1.000 km = 0.621 mi: Route transition

== See also ==
- Transportation in Edmonton
