= Crystal Meadows, Alberta =

Crystal Meadows
- Designated place
- Location of Crystal Meadows Crystal Meadows (Canada)
- Coordinates: 53.563°N 114.168°W
- Country: Canada
- Province: Alberta
- Region: Edmonton Metropolitan Region
- Census division: 11
- Municipal district: Parkland County

Government
  - Type: Unincorporated
  - Governing body: Parkland County Council

Area (2021)
  - Land: 1.14 km^{2} (0.44 sq mi)

Population (2021)
  - Total: 123
  - Density: 108.3/km^{2} (280/sq mi)
- Time zone: UTC−06:00 (Alberta Time)
- Area codes: 780, 587, 825

Crystal Meadows is an unincorporated community in Alberta, Canada within Parkland County that is recognized as a designated place by Statistics Canada. It is located on the east side of Range Road 21, 0.3 km (0.19 mi) south of Highway 16.

== Demographics ==
In the 2021 Census of Population conducted by Statistics Canada, Crystal Meadows had a population of 123 living in 43 of its 45 total private dwellings, a change of 1.7% from its 2016 population of 121. With a land area of 1.14 km^{2} (0.44 sq mi), it had a population density of 107.9/km^{2} (279.4/sq mi) in 2021.

As a designated place in the 2016 Census of Population conducted by Statistics Canada, Crystal Meadows had a population of 121 living in 43 of its 44 total private dwellings, a change of −4.7% from its 2011 population of 127. With a land area of 1.14 km^{2} (0.44 sq mi), it had a population density of 106.1/km^{2} (274.9/sq mi) in 2016.

== See also ==
- List of communities in Alberta
- List of designated places in Alberta
