= Rolling Meadows, Alberta =

Rolling Meadows
- Designated place
- Location of Rolling Meadows Rolling Meadows (Canada)
- Coordinates: 53.581°N 113.852°W
- Country: Canada
- Province: Alberta
- Region: Edmonton Metropolitan Region
- Census division: 11
- Municipal district: Parkland County

Government
  - Type: Unincorporated
  - Governing body: Parkland County Council

Area (2021)
  - Land: 0.68 km^{2} (0.26 sq mi)

Population (2021)
  - Total: 67
  - Density: 99.1/km^{2} (257/sq mi)
- Time zone: UTC−06:00 (Alberta Time)
- Area codes: 780, 587, 825

Rolling Meadows is an unincorporated community in Alberta, Canada within Parkland County that is recognized as a designated place by Statistics Canada. It is located on the east side of Range Road 271, 0.7 km (0.43 mi) north of Highway 16.

== Demographics ==
In the 2021 Census of Population conducted by Statistics Canada, Rolling Meadows had a population of 67 living in 27 of its 28 total private dwellings, a change of −10.7% from its 2016 population of 75. With a land area of 0.68 km^{2} (0.26 sq mi), it had a population density of 98.5/km^{2} (255.2/sq mi) in 2021.

As a designated place in the 2016 Census of Population conducted by Statistics Canada, Rolling Meadows had a population of 80 living in 31 of its 31 total private dwellings, a change of −2.4% from its 2011 population of 82. With a land area of 0.69 km^{2} (0.27 sq mi), it had a population density of 115.9/km^{2} (300.3/sq mi) in 2016.

== See also ==
- List of communities in Alberta
- List of designated places in Alberta
