= Weslake Estates, Alberta =

Weslake Estates Westlake Estates
- Designated place
- Location of Weslake Estates Weslake Estates (Canada)
- Coordinates: 53.526°N 114.080°W
- Country: Canada
- Province: Alberta
- Region: Edmonton Metropolitan Region
- Census division: 11
- Municipal district: Parkland County

Government
  - Type: Unincorporated
  - Governing body: Parkland County Council

Area (2021)
  - Land: 0.78 km^{2} (0.30 sq mi)

Population (2021)
  - Total: 133
  - Density: 170.8/km^{2} (442/sq mi)
- Time zone: UTC−06:00 (Alberta Time)
- Area codes: 780, 587, 825

Weslake Estates is an unincorporated community in Alberta, Canada within Parkland County that is recognized as a designated place by Statistics Canada. It is located on the west side of Range Road 13, 0.7 km (0.43 mi) south of Highway 16A. Prior to 2021, Statistics Canada referred to Weslake Estates as Westlake Estates.

== Demographics ==
In the 2021 Census of Population conducted by Statistics Canada, Weslake Estates had a population of 133 living in 47 of its 47 total private dwellings, a change of 9% from its 2016 population of 122. With a land area of 0.78 km^{2} (0.30 sq mi), it had a population density of 170.5/km^{2} (441.6/sq mi) in 2021.

As a designated place in the 2016 Census of Population conducted by Statistics Canada, Weslake Estates had a population of 239 living in 87 of its 88 total private dwellings, a change of 21.9% from its 2011 population of 196. With a land area of 1.88 km^{2} (0.73 sq mi), it had a population density of 127.1/km^{2} (329.3/sq mi) in 2016.

== See also ==
- List of communities in Alberta
- List of designated places in Alberta
