= Westbrooke Crescents, Alberta =

Westbrooke Crescents
- Designated place
- Location of Westbrooke Crescents Westbrooke Crescents (Canada)
- Coordinates: 53.592°N 113.983°W
- Country: Canada
- Province: Alberta
- Region: Edmonton Metropolitan Region
- Census division: 11
- Municipal district: Parkland County

Government
  - Type: Unincorporated
  - Governing body: Parkland County Council

Area (2021)
  - Land: 2.47 km^{2} (0.95 sq mi)

Population (2021)
  - Total: 238
  - Density: 96.2/km^{2} (249/sq mi)
- Time zone: UTC−06:00 (Alberta Time)
- Area codes: 780, 587, 825

Westbrooke Crescents is an unincorporated community in Alberta, Canada within Parkland County that is recognized as a designated place by Statistics Canada. It is located on the east side of Range Road 280, 1.6 km (0.99 mi) north of Highway 16.

== Demographics ==
In the 2021 Census of Population conducted by Statistics Canada, Westbrooke Crescents had a population of 238 living in 86 of its 89 total private dwellings, a change of 6.3% from its 2016 population of 224. With a land area of 2.47 km^{2} (0.95 sq mi), it had a population density of 96.4/km^{2} (249.6/sq mi) in 2021.

As a designated place in the 2016 Census of Population conducted by Statistics Canada, Westbrooke Crescents had a population of 224 living in 86 of its 91 total private dwellings, a change of −9.3% from its 2011 population of 247. With a land area of 2.47 km^{2} (0.95 sq mi), it had a population density of 90.7/km^{2} (234.9/sq mi) in 2016.

== See also ==
- List of communities in Alberta
- List of designated places in Alberta
