= Poplar Ridge, Alberta (designated place) =

Poplar Ridge
- Designated place
- Location of Poplar Ridge Poplar Ridge (Canada)
- Coordinates: 52.297°N 113.942°W
- Country: Canada
- Province: Alberta
- Region: Central Alberta
- Census division: 8
- Municipal district: Red Deer County

Government
  - Type: Unincorporated
  - Governing body: Red Deer County Council

Area (2021)
  - Land: 1.28 km^{2} (0.49 sq mi)

Population (2021)
  - Total: 329
  - Density: 256.2/km^{2} (664/sq mi)
- Time zone: UTC−06:00 (Alberta Time)
- Area codes: 403, 587, 825

Poplar Ridge is an unincorporated community in Alberta, Canada within Red Deer County that is recognized as a designated place by Statistics Canada. The community is located on the north side of Highway 11 between Range Road 283 and Range Road 284. Poplar Ridge is 6 km (3.7 mi) west of the City of Red Deer and 9 km (5.6 mi) east of the Town of Sylvan Lake.

== Demographics ==
In the 2021 Census of Population conducted by Statistics Canada, Poplar Ridge had a population of 329 living in 127 of its 128 total private dwellings, a change of −6.8% from its 2016 population of 353. With a land area of 1.28 km^{2} (0.49 sq mi), it had a population density of 257.0/km^{2} (665.7/sq mi) in 2021.

As a designated place in the 2016 Census of Population conducted by Statistics Canada, Poplar Ridge had a population of 559 living in 196 of its 196 total private dwellings, a change of −1.1% from its 2011 population of 565. With a land area of 1.91 km^{2} (0.74 sq mi), it had a population density of 292.7/km^{2} (758.0/sq mi) in 2016.

== See also ==
- List of communities in Alberta
- List of designated places in Alberta
