= Meso West, Alberta =

Meso West
- Designated place
- Location of Meso West Meso West (Canada)
- Coordinates: 53.592°N 114.309°W
- Country: Canada
- Province: Alberta
- Region: Edmonton Metropolitan Region
- Census division: 11
- Municipal district: Parkland County

Government
  - Type: Unincorporated
  - Governing body: Parkland County Council

Area (2021)
  - Land: 2.76 km^{2} (1.07 sq mi)

Population (2021)
  - Total: 305
  - Density: 110.3/km^{2} (286/sq mi)
- Time zone: UTC−06:00 (Alberta Time)
- Area codes: 780, 587, 825

Meso West is an unincorporated community in Alberta, Canada within Parkland County that is recognized as a designated place by Statistics Canada. It is located between Range Road 30 and Range Road 31, 1.6 km (0.99 mi) north of Highway 16.

== Demographics ==
In the 2021 Census of Population conducted by Statistics Canada, Meso West had a population of 305 living in 126 of its 135 total private dwellings, a change of 2% from its 2016 population of 299. With a land area of 2.76 km^{2} (1.07 sq mi), it had a population density of 110.5/km^{2} (286.2/sq mi) in 2021.

As a designated place in the 2016 Census of Population conducted by Statistics Canada, Meso West had a population of 299 living in 123 of its 134 total private dwellings, a change of −3.5% from its 2011 population of 310. With a land area of 2.77 km^{2} (1.07 sq mi), it had a population density of 107.9/km^{2} (279.6/sq mi) in 2016.

== See also ==
- List of communities in Alberta
- List of designated places in Alberta
