= Joussard =

- Hamlet
- Location of Joussard Joussard (Canada)
- Coordinates: 55°23′52″N 115°57′08″W
- Country: Canada
- Province: Alberta
- Region: Northern Alberta
- Census division: 17
- Municipal district: Big Lakes County

Government
  - Type: Unincorporated
  - Governing body: Big Lakes County Council

Area (2021)
  - Land: 19.87 km^{2} (7.67 sq mi)

Population (2021)
  - Total: 334
  - Density: 16.8/km^{2} (44/sq mi)
- Time zone: UTC−06:00 (Alberta Time)
- Area codes: 780, 587, 825

Joussard is a hamlet in northern Alberta within Big Lakes County. It is 2 kilometres (1.2 mi) north of Highway 2, approximately 83 kilometres (52 mi) west of Slave Lake.

== Demographics ==
Population history of Joussard
Year	Pop.	±%
1941	128	—
1951	218	+70.3%
1956	249	+14.2%
1961	193	−22.5%
1966	189	−2.1%
1971	269	+42.3%
1976	270	+0.4%
1981	330	+22.2%
1986	269	−18.5%
1991	256	−4.8%
1991A	260	+1.6%
1996	225	−13.5%
2001	219	−2.7%
2006	234	+6.8%
2011	181	−22.6%
2016	223	+23.2%
2016R	257	+15.2%
2021	334	+30.0%
Source: Statistics Canada

In the 2021 Census of Population conducted by Statistics Canada, Joussard had a population of 334 living in 162 of its 232 total private dwellings, a change of 30% from its 2016 population of 257. With a land area of 19.87 km^{2} (7.67 sq mi), it had a population density of 16.8/km^{2} (43.5/sq mi) in 2021.

As a designated place in the 2016 Census of Population conducted by Statistics Canada, Joussard had a population of 223 living in 100 of its 175 total private dwellings, a change of 23.2% from its 2011 population of 181. With a land area of 3.68 km^{2} (1.42 sq mi), it had a population density of 60.6/km^{2} (156.9/sq mi) in 2016.

== See also ==
- List of communities in Alberta
- List of designated places in Alberta
- List of hamlets in Alberta
