= Lakeview, Alberta =

Lakeview
- Summer village
- Summer Village of Lakeview
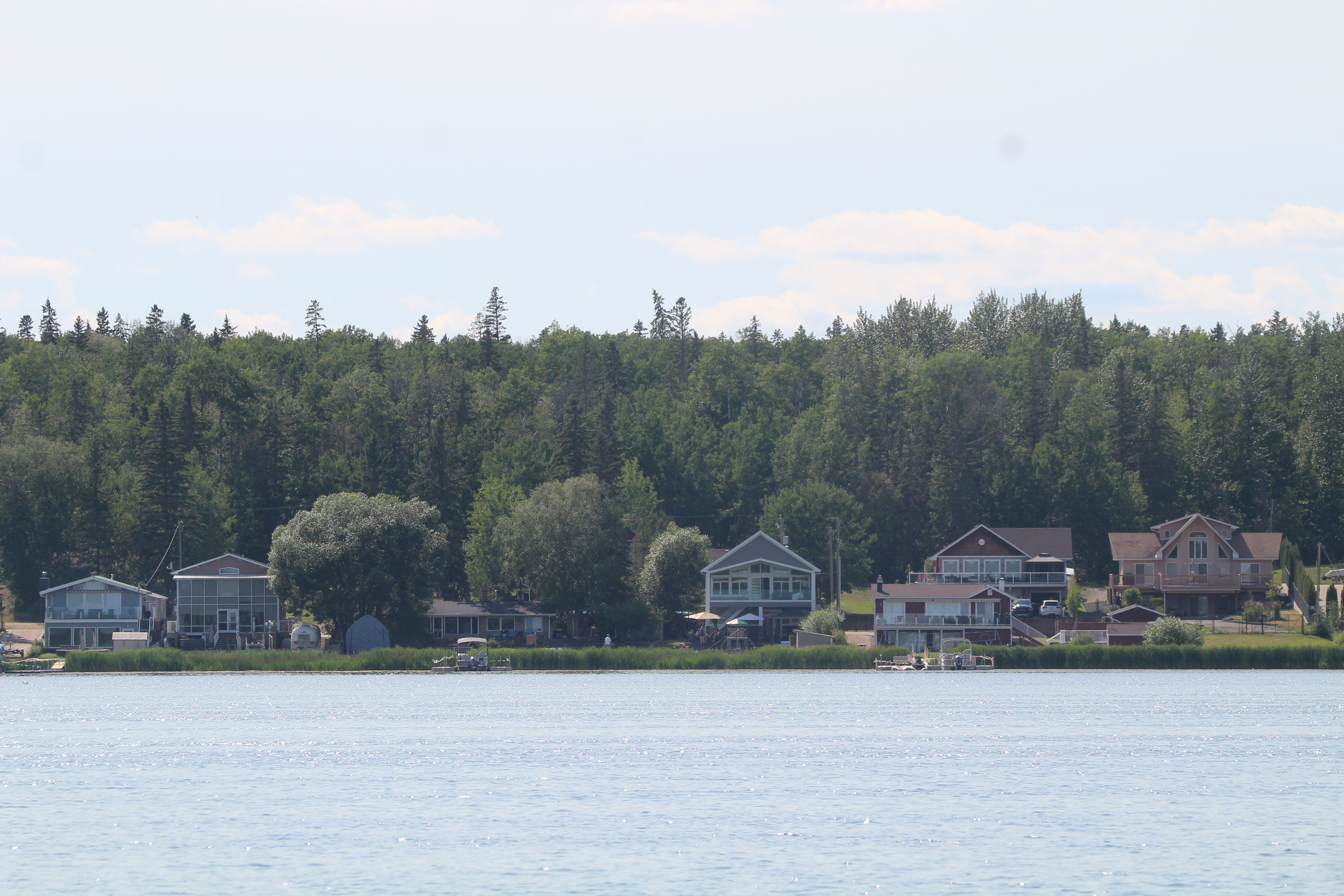

- Location of Summer Village of Lakeview in Alberta
- Coordinates: 53°33′35″N 114°27′32″W
- Country: Canada
- Province: Alberta
- Region: Edmonton Metropolitan Region
- Census division: No. 11
- Incorporated: December 31, 1913

Government
  - Type: Municipal incorporation
  - Mayor: Earle Robertson
  - Governing body: Lakeview Summer Village Council

Area (2021)
  - Land: 0.32 km^{2} (0.12 sq mi)

Population (2021)
  - Total: 29
  - Density: 90.8/km^{2} (235/sq mi)
- Time zone: UTC−06:00 (Alberta Time)
- Forward sortation area: T8R
- Area codes: 780, 587, 825
- Highways: Highway 16
- Waterway: Wabamun Lake
- Website: www.lakeview.ca

Lakeview is a summer village in central Alberta, Canada, located on Wabamun Lake. It is located within Parkland County.

== History ==
Lakeview was established on December 31, 1913, through the severance of lands from the Village of Wabamun.

== Demographics ==
In the 2021 Census of Population conducted by Statistics Canada, the Summer Village of Lakeview had a population of 29 living in 17 of its 35 total private dwellings, a change of −3.3% from its 2016 population of 30. With a land area of 0.32 km^{2} (0.12 sq mi), it had a population density of 90.6/km^{2} (234.7/sq mi) in 2021.

In the 2016 Census of Population conducted by Statistics Canada, the Summer Village of Lakeview had a population of 30 living in 13 of its 23 total private dwellings, a 15.4% change from its 2011 population of 26. With a land area of 0.35 km^{2} (0.14 sq mi), it had a population density of 85.7/km^{2} (222.0/sq mi) in 2016.

== See also ==
- List of communities in Alberta
- List of summer villages in Alberta
- List of resort villages in Saskatchewan
