= Woodland Park, Alberta =

Woodland Park
- Unincorporated Community; Designated place
- Location within Alberta
- Coordinates: 53.431°N 113.801°W
- Country: Canada
- Province: Alberta
- Region: Edmonton Capital Region
- Municipal district: Parkland County
- Census Divisions: No. 11

Government
  - Type: Unincorporated
  - Mayor: Allan Gamble
  - Governing body: Parkland County Council: Natalie Birnie; Allan William Hoefsloot; Phyllis Kobasiuk; Kristina Kowalski; Sally Kucher Johnson; Rob Wiedeman

Area (2021)
  - Land: 2.21 km^{2} (0.85 sq mi)
- Elevation: 702 m (2,303 ft)

Population (2021)
  - Total: 211
  - Density: 95.3/km^{2} (247/sq mi)
- Time zone: UTC−06:00 (Alberta Time)

Woodland Park is an unincorporated community in Alberta, Canada within Parkland County that is recognized as a designated place by Statistics Canada. It is located on the north side of Township Road 514, 0.8 km (0.50 mi) west of Highway 60.

== Demographics ==
In the 2021 Census of Population conducted by Statistics Canada, Woodland Park had a population of 211 living in 77 of its 79 total private dwellings, a change of −14.2% from its 2016 population of 246. With a land area of 2.21 km^{2} (0.85 sq mi), it had a population density of 95.5/km^{2} (247.3/sq mi) in 2021.

As a designated place in the 2016 Census of Population conducted by Statistics Canada, Woodland Park had a population of 328 living in 120 of its 133 total private dwellings, a change of −16.8% from its 2011 population of 394. With a land area of 2.85 km^{2} (1.10 sq mi), it had a population density of 115.1/km^{2} (298.1/sq mi) in 2016.

== See also ==
- List of communities in Alberta
- List of designated places in Alberta
