= Clearwater Estates, Alberta =

Clearwater Estates
- Designated place
- Location of Clearwater Estates Clearwater Estates (Canada)
- Coordinates: 53.568°N 114.081°W
- Country: Canada
- Province: Alberta
- Region: Edmonton Metropolitan Region
- Census division: 11
- Municipal district: Parkland County

Government
  - Type: Unincorporated
  - Governing body: Parkland County Council

Area (2021)
  - Land: 0.25 km^{2} (0.097 sq mi)

Population (2021)
  - Total: 41
  - Density: 162.8/km^{2} (422/sq mi)
- Time zone: UTC−06:00 (Alberta Time)
- Area codes: 780, 587, 825

Clearwater Estates is an unincorporated community in Alberta, Canada within Parkland County that is recognized as a designated place by Statistics Canada. It is located on the west side of Range Road 264, 0.2 km (0.12 mi) south of Highway 16.

== Demographics ==
In the 2021 Census of Population conducted by Statistics Canada, Clearwater Estates had a population of 41 living in 17 of its 18 total private dwellings, a change of −46.1% from its 2016 population of 76. With a land area of 0.25 km^{2} (0.097 sq mi), it had a population density of 164.0/km^{2} (424.8/sq mi) in 2021.

As a designated place in the 2016 Census of Population conducted by Statistics Canada, Clearwater Estates had a population of 76 living in 31 of its 33 total private dwellings, a change of 10.1% from its 2011 population of 69. With a land area of 0.39 km^{2} (0.15 sq mi), it had a population density of 194.9/km^{2} (504.7/sq mi) in 2016.

== See also ==
- List of communities in Alberta
- List of designated places in Alberta
