= Magnolia, Alberta =

Community in Alberta, Canada

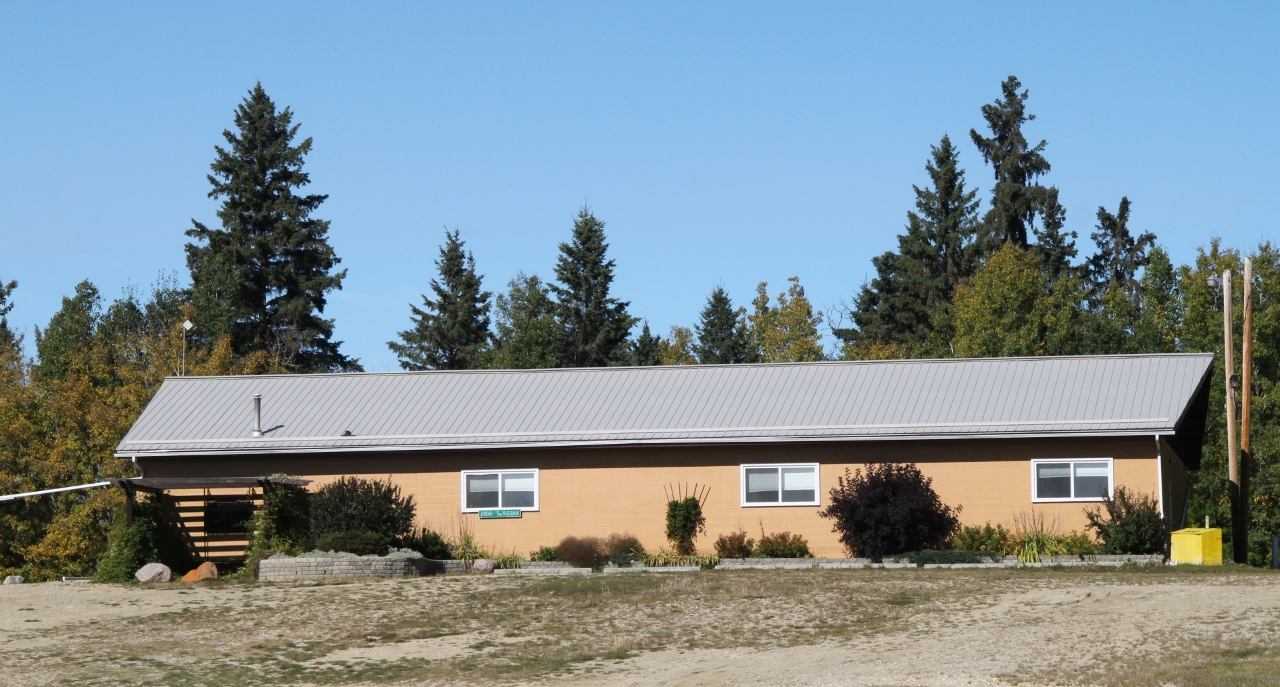
Magnolia Community Hall

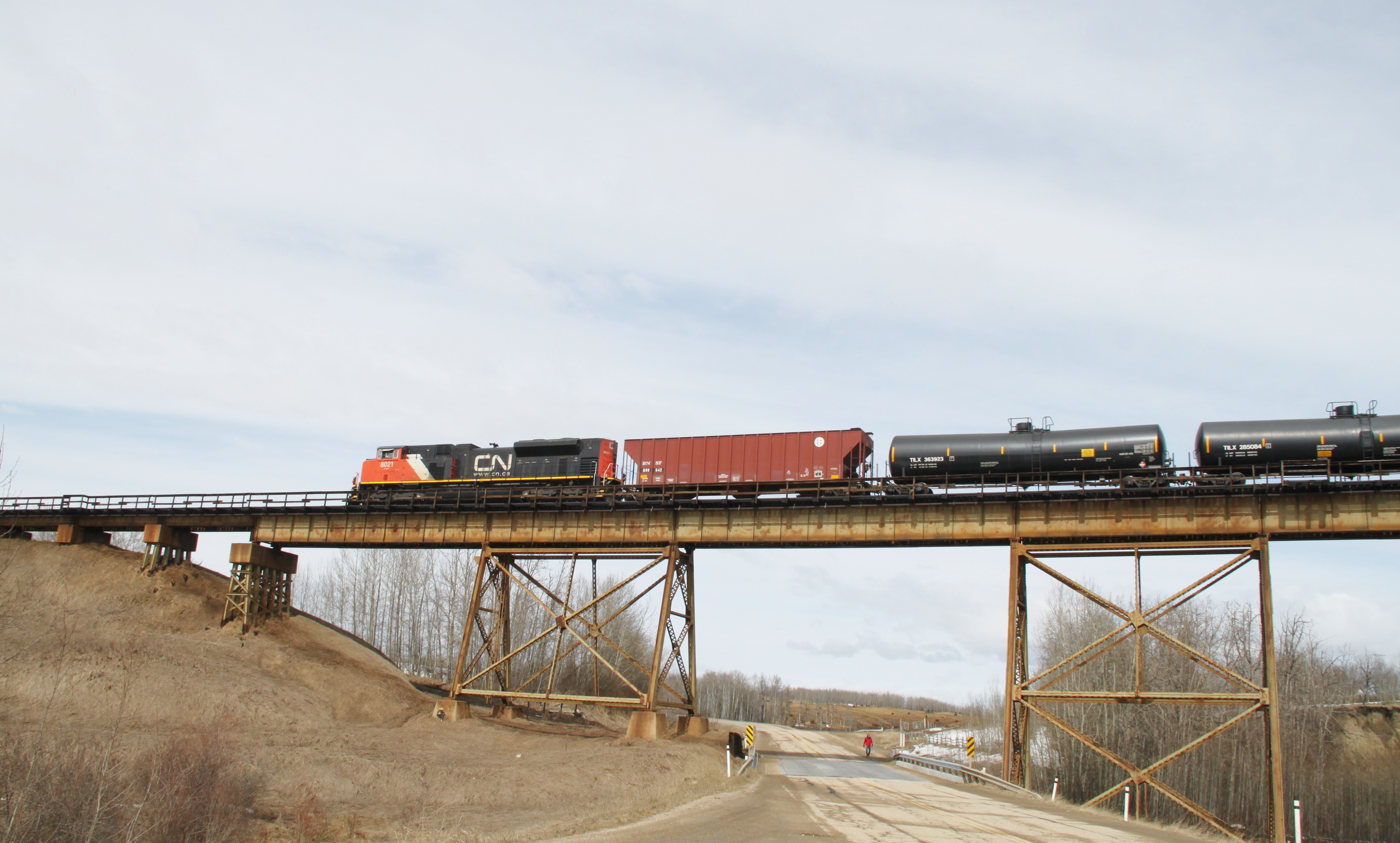
Canadian National Railways train crosses the Magnolia Bridge

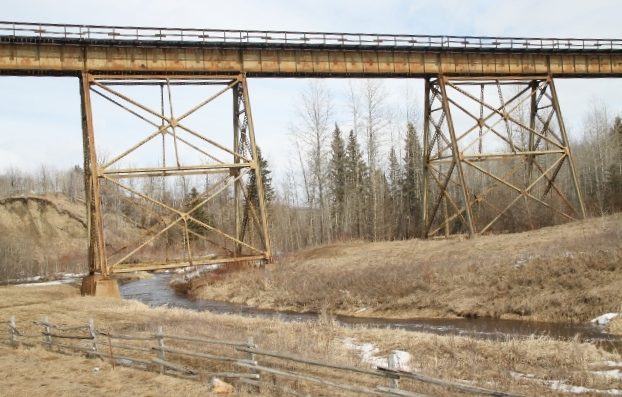
The Sturgeon River flows under the railway bridge at Magnolia

Magnolia is a farming and ranching community located within Parkland County in the Canadian province of Alberta. It is on the west end of Isle Lake and east of the Pembina River in west-central Alberta.

== History ==
Both the Foley Trail and the Yellowhead Trail, fur trade routes, passed through this area. In the 1860s Pierre and Marie Grey established their stopping house and independent trading post on the northwest corner of Isle Lake (also known as Lake Isle) . In 1905, Swedish homesteaders arrived in the area. The first post office was also opened in 1908. The Magnolia School was opened in 1911 and operated until 1948. The Magnolia Community Hall is the only public building on the old Magnolia townsite. On May 29, 1982, Magnolia was hit by an F0 tornado.

=== Railway history ===
In 1908, the Canadian Northern Railway was built roughly along the Yellowhead Trail route and a railway station was established at Magnolia. The Grand Trunk Pacific Railway was built on a path through Stony Plain and Wabamun, coming around the south side of [[Isle Lake]] , passing over the Magnolia Bridge, two miles south of the Magnolia townsite. The two railways ran in parallel west of Magnolia. The Canadian Northern Railway tracks were eventually torn out. The Magnolia Bridge was converted from wood to steel and is used by Canadian National Railways.

== Geography ==
The Magnolia area is hilly, with gravel moraines left by retreating ice sheets. There are areas of muskeg. Creeks and rivers feed into Round Lake and Isle Lake. The Sturgeon River flows under the Magnolia Bridge before it reaches Isle Lake.

== Authors from Magnolia ==
- Anderson, Harold (translator). Thomeus, Edwin. Letters of a Swedish Homesteader: life in Magnolia 1905 - 1912. (1983).
- Brown, Eric J. Ingrid: an immigrant's tale (2000); Anna: her odyssey to freedom (2002); Ginny: a Canadian story of love and friendship (2002); The Promise (2004); To the Last Tree Standing (2006); Third Time Lucky (2009); The School of Opportunity (2010); Neogaea (2013).
- Campbell, Gene. Seven More Sleeps: memories of the Brazeau River gas plant. (2008); Clouds and Other Aerial Phenomena (2024).
- MacLeod, Jenny. "The Open Gate", serialized in the Western Producer, beginning December 4, 1960.

== See also ==
- Lists of Canadian tornadoes and tornado outbreaks
