= Jackfish Lake (Alberta) =

Lake in Alberta, Canada

- Location within Alberta Location within Canada
- Location: Parkland County, Alberta
- Coordinates: 53°29′02″N 114°15′05″W
- Basin countries: Canada
- Max. length: 3.6 km (2.2 mi)
- Max. width: 2.9 km (1.8 mi)
- Surface area: 2.39 km^{2} (0.92 sq mi)
- Average depth: 3.4 m (11 ft)
- Max. depth: 9 m (30 ft)
- Surface elevation: 731 m (2,398 ft)
- References: Jackfish Lake

Jackfish Lake is a lake in Parkland County, Alberta, Canada.

The lake is named after the northern pike found in the lake, often locally called a jackfish. The lake also contains walleye and yellow perch.

Parkland County operates the Jackfish Lake Recreation Area and Boat Launch located just off Highway 770 at Township Road 522. It features a boat launch for motorized boats, beach area for swimming, fishing, and a picnic area. The park is open in the winter months for ice fishing.

It is located about 60 kilometres west of the city of Edmonton and 25 km west of the town of Stony Plain.

With approximately 60 per cent of the shoreline developed, Alberta Environment considers Jackfish Lake to be at high risk of water quality and natural habitat deterioration. Heavy use of the lake including boat congestion has amplified these risks.

The Jackfish Lake Management Association is an independent community-based, non-profit organization formed in 1995. The mission of the JLMA is to provide for the management and conservation of Jackfish Lake resources for present and future generations; specifically the management and conservation of surface use, safety, water quality, fish and wildlife, and development. Over the last 25 years, the residents of Jackfish Lake have worked closely with each another, with the Government of Alberta and with Parkland County to attempt to address lake ecosystem challenges with the intent of ensuring the lake's long term viability and environmental sustainability.

== See also ==
- List of lakes of Alberta
