= Erin Estates, Alberta =

Erin Estates
- Designated place
- Location of Erin Estates Erin Estates (Canada)
- Coordinates: 53.639°N 113.940°W
- Country: Canada
- Province: Alberta
- Region: Edmonton Metropolitan Region
- Census division: 11
- Municipal district: Parkland County

Government
  - Type: Unincorporated
  - Governing body: Parkland County Council

Area (2021)
  - Land: 0.66 km^{2} (0.25 sq mi)

Population (2021)
  - Total: 75
  - Density: 114.4/km^{2} (296/sq mi)
- Time zone: UTC−06:00 (Alberta Time)
- Area codes: 780, 587, 825

Erin Estates is an unincorporated community in Alberta, Canada within Parkland County that is recognized as a designated place by Statistics Canada. It is located on the west side of Range Road 274, 1.6 km (0.99 mi) south of Highway 633. It is adjacent to the designated place of Panorama Heights to the south.

== Demographics ==
In the 2021 Census of Population conducted by Statistics Canada, Erin Estates had a population of 75 living in 27 of its 28 total private dwellings, a change of −38.5% from its 2016 population of 122. With a land area of 0.66 km^{2} (0.25 sq mi), it had a population density of 113.6/km^{2} (294.3/sq mi) in 2021.

As a designated place in the 2016 Census of Population conducted by Statistics Canada, Erin Estates had a population of 44 living in 15 of its 17 total private dwellings, a change of −43.6% from its 2011 population of 78. With a land area of 0.52 km^{2} (0.20 sq mi), it had a population density of 84.6/km^{2} (219.2/sq mi) in 2016.

== See also ==
- List of communities in Alberta
- List of designated places in Alberta
