= MacKay, Alberta =

MacKay
- Locality
- Location within Yellowhead County Location within Alberta
- Coordinates: 53°38′34″N 115°35′11″W
- Country: Canada
- Province: Alberta
- Municipal district: Yellowhead County
- Hamlet designation: May 14, 1979
- Hamlet repeal: February 26, 2016

Area (2021)
  - Land: 0.02 km^{2} (0.0077 sq mi)

Population (2021)
  - Total: 10
  - Density: 512.8/km^{2} (1,328/sq mi)
- Time zone: UTC−06:00 (Alberta Time)

MacKay is a locality in west-central Alberta, Canada within Yellowhead County. It is located on the Yellowhead Highway (Highway 16) approximately 57 km (35 mi) east of Edson.

Statistics Canada recognizes MacKay as a designated place. It was designated as a hamlet between 1979 and 2019.

== History ==
MacKay was designated a hamlet by the Government of Alberta on May 14, 1979, for the purpose of accessing street restoration funding. Yellowhead County repealed the hamlet designation on February 26, 2019.

== Demographics ==
Population history of MacKay
Year	Pop.	±%
1991	18	—
1996	19	+5.6%
2001	15	−21.1%
2006	30	+100.0%
2011	5	−83.3%
2016	10	+100.0%
2021	10	+0.0%
Source: Statistics Canada

In the 2021 Census of Population conducted by Statistics Canada, MacKay had a population of 10 living in 4 of its 9 total private dwellings, a change of 0% from its 2016 population of 10. With a land area of 0.02 km^{2} (0.0077 sq mi), it had a population density of 500.0/km^{2} (1,295.0/sq mi) in 2021.

As a designated place in the 2016 Census of Population conducted by Statistics Canada, MacKay had a population of 10 living in 7 of its 12 total private dwellings, a change of 100% from its 2011 population of 5. With a land area of 0.02 km^{2} (0.0077 sq mi), it had a population density of 500.0/km^{2} (1,295.0/sq mi) in 2016.

== See also ==
- List of communities in Alberta
- List of designated places in Alberta
