= Osborne Acres, Alberta =

Osborne Acres
- Designated place
- Location of Osborne Acres Osborne Acres (Canada)
- Coordinates: 53.558°N 113.799°W
- Country: Canada
- Province: Alberta
- Region: Edmonton Metropolitan Region
- Census division: 11
- Municipal district: Parkland County

Government
  - Type: Unincorporated
  - Governing body: Parkland County Council

Area (2021)
  - Land: 1.49 km^{2} (0.58 sq mi)

Population (2021)
  - Total: 101
  - Density: 67.6/km^{2} (175/sq mi)
- Time zone: UTC−06:00 (Alberta Time)
- Area codes: 780, 587, 825

Osborne Acres is an unincorporated community in Alberta, Canada within Parkland County that is recognized as a designated place by Statistics Canada. It is located on the west side of Range Road 264, 1.0 km (0.62 mi) south of Highway 16.

== Demographics ==
In the 2021 Census of Population conducted by Statistics Canada, Osborne Acres had a population of 101 living in 30 of its 31 total private dwellings, a change of −12.9% from its 2016 population of 116. With a land area of 1.49 km^{2} (0.58 sq mi), it had a population density of 67.8/km^{2} (175.6/sq mi) in 2021.

As a designated place in the 2016 Census of Population conducted by Statistics Canada, Osborne Acres had a population of 116 living in 37 of its 41 total private dwellings, a change of 11.5% from its 2011 population of 104. With a land area of 1.49 km^{2} (0.58 sq mi), it had a population density of 77.9/km^{2} (201.6/sq mi) in 2016.

== See also ==
- List of communities in Alberta
- List of designated places in Alberta
