= Grandmuir Estates, Alberta =

Grandmuir Estates
- Designated place
- Location of Grandmuir Estates Grandmuir Estates (Canada)
- Coordinates: 53.631°N 113.953°W
- Country: Canada
- Province: Alberta
- Region: Edmonton Metropolitan Region
- Census division: 11
- Municipal district: Parkland County

Government
  - Type: Unincorporated
  - Governing body: Parkland County Council

Area (2021)
  - Land: 0.62 km^{2} (0.24 sq mi)

Population (2021)
  - Total: 91
  - Density: 148/km^{2} (380/sq mi)
- Time zone: UTC−06:00 (Alberta Time)
- Area codes: 780, 587, 825

Grandmuir Estates is an unincorporated community in Alberta, Canada within Parkland County that is recognized as a designated place by Statistics Canada. It is located on the east side of Range Road 275, 2.4 km (1.5 mi) south of Highway 633. It is adjacent to the designated place of Panorama Heights to the east.

== Demographics ==
In the 2021 Census of Population conducted by Statistics Canada, Grandmuir Estates had a population of 91 living in 34 of its 34 total private dwellings, a change of 3.4% from its 2016 population of 88. With a land area of 0.62 km^{2} (0.24 sq mi), it had a population density of 146.8/km^{2} (380.1/sq mi) in 2021.

As a designated place in the 2016 Census of Population conducted by Statistics Canada, Grandmuir Estates had a population of 88 living in 31 of its 31 total private dwellings, a change of 31.3% from its 2011 population of 67. With a land area of 0.35 km^{2} (0.14 sq mi), it had a population density of 251.4/km^{2} (651.2/sq mi) in 2016.

== See also ==
- List of communities in Alberta
- List of designated places in Alberta
