= Duffield, Alberta =

Duffield
- Hamlet
- Location of Duffield Duffield (Canada)
- Coordinates: 53°31′41″N 114°20′39″W
- Country: Canada
- Province: Alberta
- Region: Edmonton Metropolitan Region
- Census division: 11
- Municipal district: Parkland County

Government
  - Type: Unincorporated
  - Governing body: Parkland County Council

Area (2021)
  - Land: 0.32 km^{2} (0.12 sq mi)

Population (2021)
  - Total: 60
  - Density: 186.3/km^{2} (483/sq mi)
- Time zone: UTC−06:00 (Alberta Time)
- Area codes: 780, 587, 825

Duffield is a hamlet in central Alberta, Canada within Parkland County. It is located 5 kilometres (3.1 mi) south of Highway 16, approximately 30 kilometres (19 mi) west of Spruce Grove.

The community has the name of George Duffield Hall.

== Demographics ==
Population history of Duffield
Year	Pop.	±%
1941	72	—
1951	51	−29.2%
1956	70	+37.3%
1961	66	−5.7%
1966	57	−13.6%
1971	63	+10.5%
1976	83	+31.7%
1981	76	−8.4%
1986	72	−5.3%
1991	57	−20.8%
2011	71	+24.6%
2016	67	−5.6%
2021	60	−10.4%
Source: Statistics Canada

In the 2021 Census of Population conducted by Statistics Canada, Duffield had a population of 60 living in 28 of its 30 total private dwellings, a change of −10.4% from its 2016 population of 67. With a land area of 0.32 km^{2} (0.12 sq mi), it had a population density of 187.5/km^{2} (485.6/sq mi) in 2021.

As a designated place in the 2016 Census of Population conducted by Statistics Canada, Duffield had a population of 67 living in 26 of its 30 total private dwellings, a change of −5.6% from its 2011 population of 71. With a land area of 0.32 km^{2} (0.12 sq mi), it had a population density of 209.4/km^{2} (542.3/sq mi) in 2016.

== See also ==
- List of communities in Alberta
- List of hamlets in Alberta
