= Alberta Highway 779 =

Highway in Alberta, Canada

Highway 779
- Range Road 10
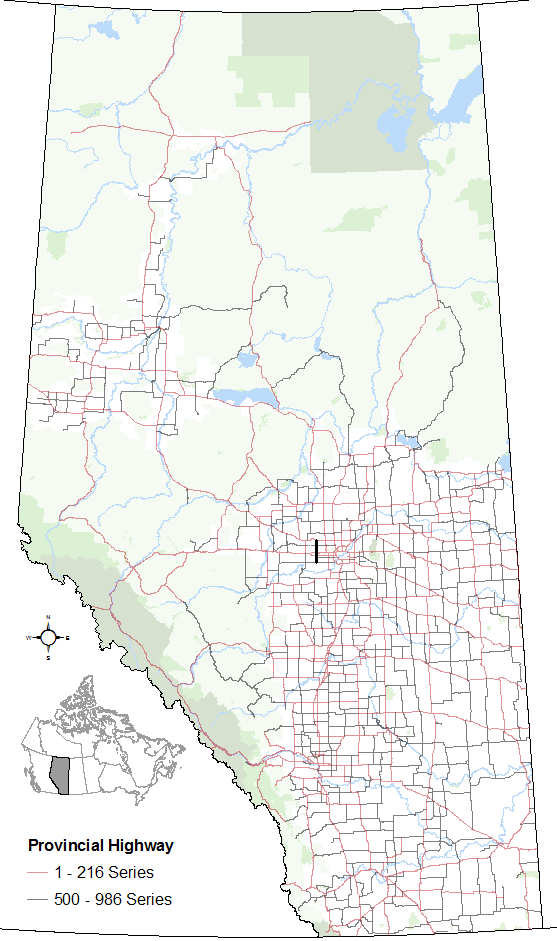

Route information
- Maintained by Alberta Transportation
- Length: 29.74 km (18.48 mi)

Major junctions
- South end: Highway 627 south of Stony Plain
- Highway 16A in Stony Plain; Highway 16 (TCH) near Stony Plain
- North end: Highway 37 west of Calahoo

Location
- Country: Canada
- Province: Alberta
- Specialized and rural municipalities: Parkland County, Sturgeon County
- Towns: Stony Plain

Highway system
- Alberta Provincial Highway Network; List; Former
| ← Highway 778 | → Highway 780 |

Alberta Provincial Highway No. 779 is a highway in the province of Alberta, Canada. It runs south–north from Highway 627 (Garden Valley Road) in Parkland County through the Town of Stony Plain to Highway 37 west of Calahoo in Sturgeon County. It runs along the Fifth Meridian for its entire length, which was surveyed as 114° Longitude in the Dominion Land Survey, and used by the Alberta Township System. The highway is also known as Range Road 10 in the two counties and 48 Street within Stony Plain.

== Major intersections ==
Starting from the south end of Highway 779:

| Rural/specialized municipality | Location | km | mi | Destinations | Notes |
|---|---|---|---|---|---|
| Parkland County | | 0 | 0.0 | Highway 627 (Garden Valley Road) – Keephills, Edmonton | Southern terminus |
| Parkland County | Stony Plain | 6 | 3.7 | 79 Avenue (Highway 628 east) | |
| Parkland County | Stony Plain | 9 | 5.6 | Highway 16A – Jasper, Spruce Grove, Edmonton | Interchange |
| Parkland County | | 13 | 8.1 | Highway 16 (TCH/YH) – Jasper, Edmonton | Interchange; Hwy 16 exit 355 |
| Sturgeon County | | 22 | 14 | Highway 633 – Alberta Beach, Villeneuve, St. Albert | |
| Sturgeon County | | 30 | 19 | Highway 37 – Onoway, Calahoo, Fort Saskatchewan | Northern terminus |
1.000 mi = 1.609 km; 1.000 km = 0.621 mi
