= Panorama Heights, Alberta =

Panorama Heights
- Designated place
- Location of Panorama Heights Panorama Heights (Canada)
- Coordinates: 53.632°N 113.940°W
- Country: Canada
- Province: Alberta
- Region: Edmonton Metropolitan Region
- Census division: 11
- Municipal district: Parkland County

Government
  - Type: Unincorporated
  - Governing body: Parkland County Council

Area (2021)
  - Land: 0.65 km^{2} (0.25 sq mi)

Population (2021)
  - Total: 110
  - Density: 170.2/km^{2} (441/sq mi)
- Time zone: UTC−06:00 (Alberta Time)
- Area codes: 780, 587, 825

Panorama Heights is an unincorporated community in Alberta, Canada within Parkland County that is recognized as a designated place by Statistics Canada. It is located on the west side of Range Road 274, 2.4 km (1.5 mi) south of Highway 633. It is adjacent to the designated places of Erin Estates to the north and Grandmuir Estates to the west.

== Demographics ==
In the 2021 Census of Population conducted by Statistics Canada, Panorama Heights had a population of 110 living in 39 of its 39 total private dwellings, a change of 14.6% from its 2016 population of 96. With a land area of 0.65 km^{2} (0.25 sq mi), it had a population density of 169.2/km^{2} (438.3/sq mi) in 2021.

As a designated place in the 2016 Census of Population conducted by Statistics Canada, Panorama Heights had a population of 96 living in 34 of its 36 total private dwellings, a change of −9.4% from its 2011 population of 106. With a land area of 0.65 km^{2} (0.25 sq mi), it had a population density of 147.7/km^{2} (382.5/sq mi) in 2016.

== See also ==
- List of communities in Alberta
- List of designated places in Alberta
