= WHK-FM =

WHK-FM may refer to:

- WKLV-FM, a radio station (95.5 FM) licensed to Cleveland, Ohio, United States, which briefly identified as WHK-FM in 2001
- WKDD, a radio station (98.1 FM) currently licensed to Munroe Falls, Ohio, United States, which identified as WHK-FM while licensed to Canton, Ohio, United States from 1997 to 2001
- WMMS, a radio station (100.7 FM) licensed to Cleveland, Ohio, United States, which identified as WHK-FM from 1948 to 1968
