= Haynes Creek =

Stream in Alberta, Canada

Coordinates: 52.31682°N 113.25195°W

Haynes Creek is a stream in Alberta, Canada.

Haynes Creek is named after Isaac Haynes, a pioneer settler.

== See also ==
- List of rivers of Alberta
