= Calahoo =

- Hamlet
- Location of Calahoo in Alberta
- Coordinates: 53.7111°N 113.9542°W
- Country: Canada
- Province: Alberta
- Census division: No. 11
- Municipal district: Sturgeon County

Government
  - Type: Unincorporated
  - Governing body: Sturgeon County Council

Area (2021)
  - Land: 0.66 km^{2} (0.25 sq mi)
- Elevation: 680 m (2,230 ft)

Population (2021)
  - Total: 143
  - Density: 215.4/km^{2} (558/sq mi)
- Time zone: UTC−06:00 (Alberta Time)
- Postal codes: T0G
- Area codes: 780, 587, 825
- Highways: Highway 37

Calahoo is a hamlet in Alberta, Canada within Sturgeon County. It is located on Highway 37 near the Sturgeon River, approximately 21 kilometres (13 mi) northwest of Edmonton's city limits. It has an elevation of 680 metres (2,230 ft).

The hamlet is located in Census Division No. 11 and in the federal riding of Westlock-St. Paul.

It is named after the nearby Michel Calihoo Reserve established in 1878 on 25,600 acres under Treaty 6.

== Demographics ==
Population history of Calahoo
Year	Pop.	±%
1941	50	—
1951	106	+112.0%
1956	111	+4.7%
1961	127	+14.4%
1966	125	−1.6%
1971	62	−50.4%
1976	143	+130.6%
1981	163	+14.0%
1986	164	+0.6%
1991	144	−12.2%
1996	126	−12.5%
2001	131	+4.0%
2006	197	+50.4%
2011	187	−5.1%
2016	85	−54.5%
2016R	123	+44.7%
2021	143	+16.3%
Source: Statistics Canada

In the 2021 Census of Population conducted by Statistics Canada, Calahoo had a population of 143 living in 59 of its 65 total private dwellings, a change of 16.3% from its 2016 population of 123. With a land area of 0.66 km^{2} (0.25 sq mi), it had a population density of 216.7/km^{2} (561.2/sq mi) in 2021.

As a designated place in the 2016 Census of Population conducted by Statistics Canada, Calahoo had a population of 85 living in 31 of its 32 total private dwellings, a change of −54.5% from its 2011 population of 187. With a land area of 0.4 km^{2} (0.15 sq mi), it had a population density of 212.5/km^{2} (550.4/sq mi) in 2016.

== Notable residents ==
- NHL hockey player and Stanley Cup winning coach Craig Berube
- NHL hockey prospect Ian Mitchell
- U Sports Player and 2022 Canada West Universities Athletic Association Champion, Ireland Perrott Power forward for the UBC Thunderbirds women's ice hockey,

== See also ==
- List of communities in Alberta
- List of designated places in Alberta
- List of hamlets in Alberta
