= Tomahawk, Alberta =

Tomahawk
- Hamlet
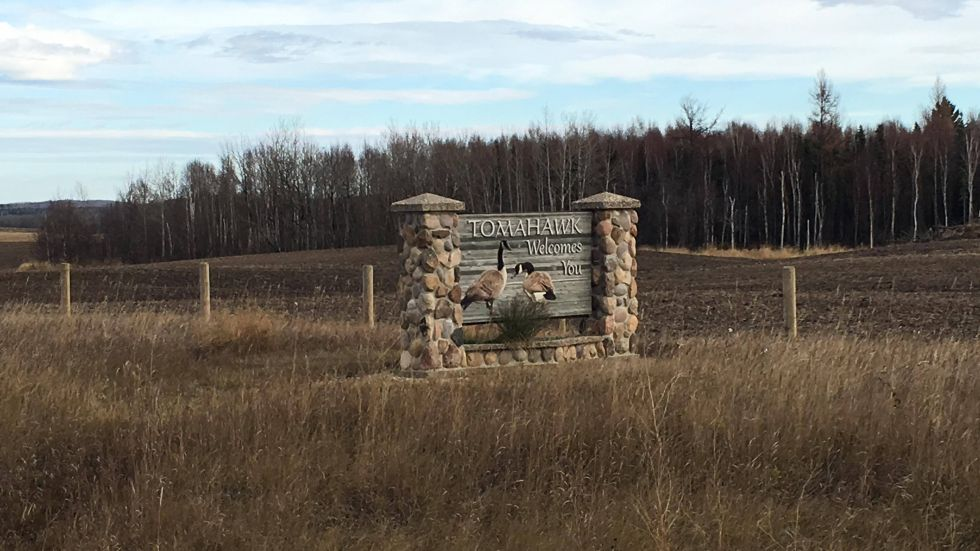
- Tomahawk, Alberta

- Location of Tomahawk in Alberta
- Coordinates: 53°23′46″N 114°45′48″W
- Country: Canada
- Province: Alberta
- Region: Central Alberta
- Census division: 11
- Municipal district: Parkland County
- Settled: 1903

Government
  - Type: Unincorporated
  - Mayor: Allan Gamble
  - Governing body: Parkland County Council: Natalie Birnie; Allan William Hoefsloot; Phyllis Kobasiuk; Kristina Kowalski; Sally Kucher Johnson; Rob Wiedeman

Area (2021)
  - Land: 1.53 km^{2} (0.59 sq mi)
- Elevation: 765 m (2,510 ft)

Population (2021)
  - Total: 113
  - Density: 73.8/km^{2} (191/sq mi)
- Time zone: UTC−06:00 (Alberta Time)
- Postal code span: T0E 2H0
- Area code: 780

Tomahawk, Alberta is a hamlet in Alberta, Canada within Parkland County. It is located on Highway 759, northeast of the Town of Drayton Valley.

The hamlet is located in Census Division No. 11 and in the federal riding of Yellowhead.

== History ==
During the fall of 1902 lumberjacks Ed Martin, Chas. (Charles) Lindell, John Kelly, and John L. Croppley scouted along an old pack trail for land. They returned with reports of good land. In March 1903 the first European settlers arrived, traveling along the same trail. In July of the same year the first woman arrived. The original building for Tomahawk School was constructed in 1909.

== Demographics ==
Population history of Tomahawk
Year	Pop.	±%
1941	48	—
1951	90	+87.5%
1956	103	+14.4%
1961	106	+2.9%
1966	74	−30.2%
1971	66	−10.8%
1976	79	+19.7%
1981	95	+20.3%
1986	103	+8.4%
1991	97	−5.8%
1996	92	−5.2%
2001	61	−33.7%
2006	65	+6.6%
2011	65	+0.0%
2016	62	−4.6%
2016R	99	+59.7%
2021	113	+14.1%
Source: Statistics Canada

In the 2021 Census of Population conducted by Statistics Canada, Tomahawk had a population of 113 living in 49 of its 59 total private dwellings, a change of 14.1% from its 2016 population of 99. With a land area of 1.53 km^{2} (0.59 sq mi), it had a population density of 73.9/km^{2} (191.3/sq mi) in 2021.

As a designated place in the 2016 Census of Population conducted by Statistics Canada, Tomahawk had a population of 62 living in 30 of its 33 total private dwellings, a change of −4.6% from its 2011 population of 65. With a land area of 0.29 km^{2} (0.11 sq mi), it had a population density of 213.8/km^{2} (553.7/sq mi) in 2016.

== Economy ==
Tomahawk's economy is largely agricultural, though it does profit from the oil and gas industry.

Businesses within Tomahawk include a gas station, a general store, an agricultural dealership, a restaurant, a butcher, a liquor store, and a hotel with a bar.

== Education ==
Just west of Tomahawk is a K-9 school named Tomahawk School. The school has a student population of 125 (as of 2012) and a teaching staff of 9 with 6 other support staff. The school is also the location of a public library, that is part of the TracPac Library System.

Specific information on Tomahawk School is available:

== Notable people ==
- Rudolph "Rusty" Zander – Canadian politician, Progressive Conservative MLA (1971-1979)
- Beth Bieda - Big Brother Canada Season 9 Contestant

== See also ==
- List of communities in Alberta
- List of designated places in Alberta
- List of hamlets in Alberta
