= Acheson, Alberta =

Acheson
- Locality
- Location in Alberta Location in Canada
- Coordinates: 53°32′45″N 113°46′17″W
- Country: Canada
- Province: Alberta
- Region: Edmonton Metropolitan Region
- Census division: 11
- Municipal district: Parkland County
- Named for: A. Acheson Tisdal

Government
  - Type: Unincorporated
  - Mayor: Allan Gamble
  - Governing body: Parkland County Council: Natalie Birnie; Allan William Hoefsloot; Phyllis Kobasiuk; Kristina Kowalski; Sally Kucher Johnson; Rob Wiedeman
- Elevation: 706 m (2,316 ft)
- Time zone: UTC−06:00 (Alberta Time)
- Postal code span: T7X
- Area codes: 780, 587, 825
- Highways: Highway 16; Highway 16A; Highway 60; Highway 628

Acheson is a locality and an industrial area in Alberta, Canada, within Parkland County.

Acheson is on the Canadian National (CN) main line and Highway 60 (Devonian Way) between Highway 16A (Parkland Highway) and Highway 16 (Yellowhead Highway). It is 3.2 km (2.0 mi) west of the City of Edmonton, 5.7 km (3.5 mi) east of the City of Spruce Grove, and 20 km (12 mi) north of the Town of Devon.

The locality is named after A. Acheson Tisdal, a railway official. Acheson was founded as a repair facility for CN, with industrial development following in the 1970s. It is recognized as a major employment area by the Edmonton Metropolitan Region Board.

== Economy ==
=== Acheson Industrial Area ===
The Acheson Industrial Area is the economic development hub of Parkland County. Its 10,000 acres (4,000 ha) of land is home to over 200 businesses. The Acheson Business Association established in 2004.

Within the Acheson Area Structure Plan, the industrial area borders the City of Edmonton to the east, Highway 16 to the north, Spruce Valley Road to the west, and Highway 628 to the south. Industrial parks within the Acheson Industrial Area include the Ellis Industrial Park, the Sherwin Industrial Park, and West Acheson Industrial.

=== Oil and gas industry ===
Profire Energy is an oilfield technology company, specializing in the design of burner-management systems (BMS) and other combustion-management technologies.
