= Alberta Highway 628 =

Highway in Alberta, Canada

Highway 628
- Whitemud Drive
- Highway 628 highlighted in red

Route information
- Maintained by Alberta Transportation

Western section
- Length: 19.1 km (11.9 mi)
- West end: Highway 779 in Stony Plain
- Major intersections: Highway 60 in Enoch Cree Nation 135
- East end: Whitemud Drive (Edmonton west city limits)

Eastern section
- Length: 6.4 km (4.0 mi)
- West end: Highway 216 / Whitemud Drive east of Edmonton
- East end: Highway 21 south of Sherwood Park

Location
- Country: Canada
- Province: Alberta
- Specialized and rural municipalities: Parkland County, Strathcona County

Highway system
- Alberta Numbered Highway Network; List; Former
← Highway 627	→ Highway 629

Alberta Provincial Highway No. 628, commonly referred to as Highway 628, is a highway in the province of Alberta, Canada, that runs west to east through the Edmonton Capital Region in two sections. The western 19-kilometre-long (12 mi) section runs from the town of Stony Plain to the Edmonton city limits at 231 Street (Range Road 261). The eastern 6-kilometre-long (4 mi) section, also known as a Whitemud Extension, runs from Anthony Henday Drive to Highway 21 and it is just at the south of Sherwood Park.

Whitemud Drive (79 Avenue west of Winterburn Road) connects both sections directly through Edmonton city limits. However, it is not signed as Highway 628 – is also known as 79 Avenue in Stony Plain.

== Major intersections ==
From west to east:

Rural/specialized municipality	Location	km	mi	Destinations	Notes
Stony Plain		0.0	0.0	48 Street (Highway 779)	Highway 628 western terminus; continues as 79 Avenue
Parkland County		6.1	3.8	Range Road 273 (Golden Spike Road) – Spruce Grove	Former Highway 788
Parkland County	Enoch Cree Nation 135	15.8	9.8	Highway 60 (Devonian Way) – Acheson, Devon	
City of Edmonton		19.1	11.9	231 Street (Range Road 261)	Highway 628 eastern terminus; continues as Whitemud Drive
Gap in Highway 628; see Whitemud Drive § Exit list
Strathcona County		47.3	29.4	Anthony Henday Drive (Highway 216)	Interchange; Highway 216 exit 64; Highway 628 western terminus
Strathcona County		53.7	33.4	Highway 21 – Fort Saskatchewan, Sherwood Park, Camrose	Highway 628 eastern terminus; continues as Township Road 522
1.000 mi = 1.609 km; 1.000 km = 0.621 mi
