= Carvel, Alberta =

Carvel
- Hamlet
- Location of Carvel within Alberta
- Coordinates: 53°31′51″N 114°12′36″W
- Country: Canada
- Province: Alberta
- Region: Central Alberta
- Census Division: No. 11
- Municipal district: Parkland County

Government
  - Mayor: Allan Gamble
  - Governing body: Parkland County Council: Natalie Birnie; Allan William Hoefsloot; Phyllis Kobasiuk; Kristina Kowalski; Sally Kucher Johnson; Rob Wiedeman

Population (2009)
  - Total: 19
- Time zone: UTC−06:00 (Alberta Time)
- Postal code span: T7Y 3P2
- Area code: 780
- Website: Parkland County

Carvel is a hamlet in Alberta, Canada within Parkland County. It is located on Highway 770, approximately 35 kilometres (22 mi) west of Edmonton. The hamlet's name is derived from the novel Richard Carvel by the American writer Winston Churchill.

Carvel's largest building is the St. Nicholas Ukrainian Catholic Church and adjoining community hall.

In August 2008, a memorial to the founding pioneer families of Carvel was placed at the entrance to the church's graveyard.

Carvel is home to the CASCV Weather Radar Station, which functions as central Alberta's main weather radar station with an average range of about 240 km (150 mi).

== Demographics ==
The population of Carvel according to the 2009 municipal census conducted by Parkland County is 19.

== See also ==
- List of communities in Alberta
- List of hamlets in Alberta
