= Alberta Highway 60 =

Highway in Alberta

Highway 60
- Devonian Way
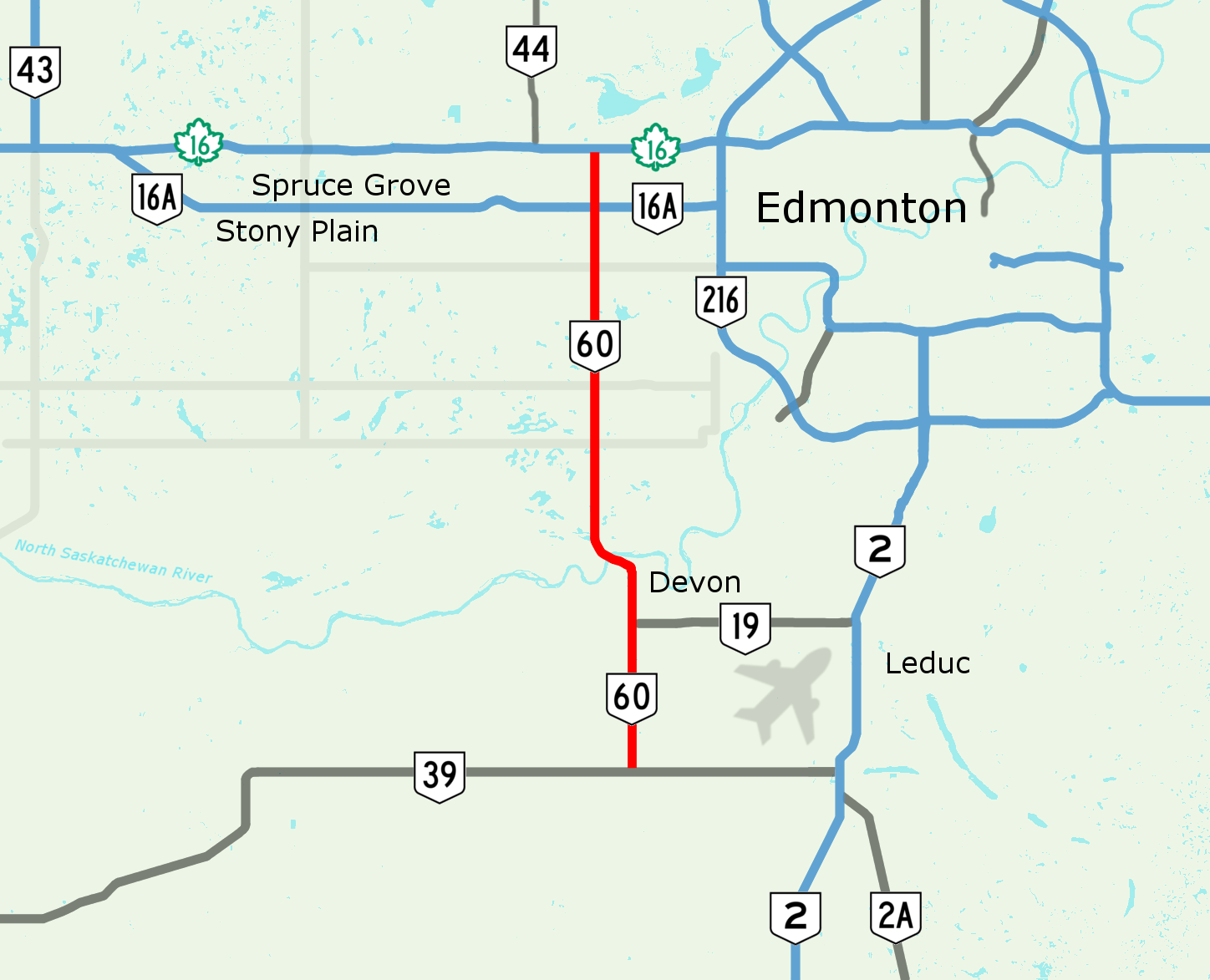
- Highway 60 highlighted in red

Route information
- Maintained by the Ministry of Transportation and Economic Corridors
- Length: 35.41 km (22.00 mi)

Major junctions
- South end: Highway 39 near Calmar
- Highway 19 in Devon; Highway 16A in Acheson
- North end: Highway 16 (TCH) in Acheson

Location
- Country: Canada
- Province: Alberta
- Specialized and rural municipalities: Leduc County, Parkland County
- Towns: Devon

Highway system
- Alberta Numbered Highway Network; List; Former
← Highway 59	→ Highway 61

Highway 60, officially named Devonian Way, is a north–south highway west of Edmonton in the Canadian province of Alberta, connecting Highway 39 to Highway 16. In tandem with Highway 19, it is often used as a southwest bypass of Edmonton for travellers wishing to avoid traffic within the city.

Highway 60 begins as a two-lane rural highway east of Calmar in central Leduc County, branching due north from Highway 39 to meet Highway 19 at the south end of Devon where it becomes a divided expressway. Passing west of Devon and entering Parkland County, it bends west to cross the North Saskatchewan River on twin bridges, curving back north across Highways 627 and 628 to reach an interchange with Highway 16A in Acheson. The divided highway briefly reverts to two lanes before expanding again to four lanes and ending at Highway 16 west of Edmonton.

Alberta Transportation has outlined plans to twin the section of Highway 60 between Highways 16 and 16A, as well as long-term plans to realign Highway 60 as a freeway slightly to the west of Devon allowing for a free-flowing connection into a newly twinned Highway 19.

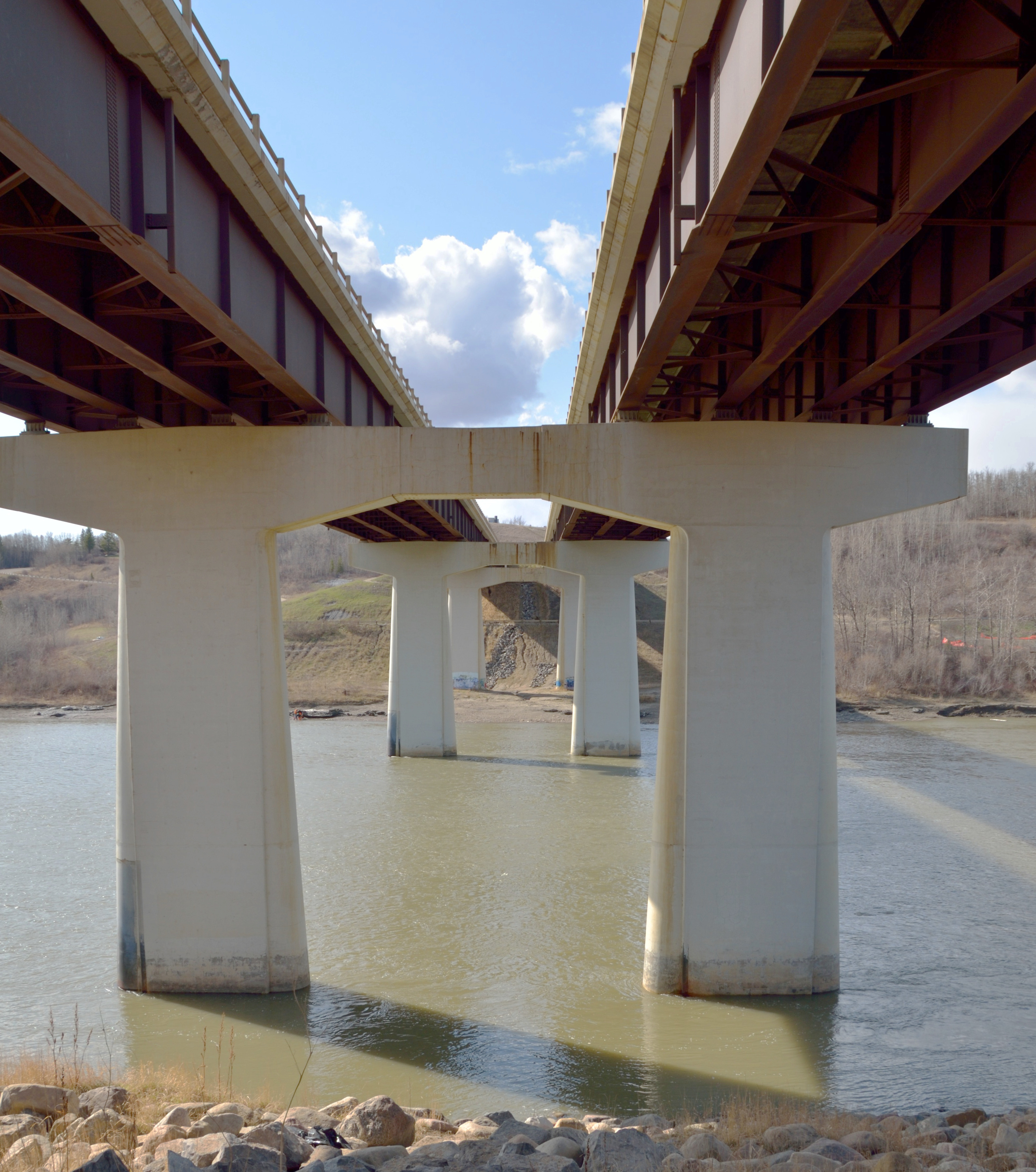
Twin bridges carry Highway 60 over the North Saskatchewan River near Devon

== Major intersections ==
From south to north:

Rural/specialized municipality	Location	km	mi	Destinations	Notes
Leduc County		0.0	0.0	Range Road 263 Highway 39 – Leduc, Drayton Valley	Roundabout; Highway 60 southern terminus
Devon		7.5– 7.9	4.7– 4.9	Highway 19 east – Nisku, Edmonton	To Edmonton International Airport
North Saskatchewan River		12.4	7.7	Devon Bridge	
Parkland County		22.1	13.7	Highway 627 (Garden Valley Road) – Highvale, Stony Plain, Edmonton	To Maskêkosihk Trail
Enoch Cree Nation	Enoch	27.0	16.8	Township Road 523	
Parkland County		28.6	17.8	Highway 628 – Stony Plain, Edmonton	To Whitemud Drive
Parkland County	Acheson	31.8	19.8	Highway 16A (Parkland Highway) – Spruce Grove, Stony Plain, Edmonton	Interchange; to Stony Plain Road / 100 Avenue
Parkland County	Acheson	35.4	22.0	Highway 16 (TCH/YH) to Highway 44 – Westlock, Spruce Grove, Edson, Jasper, Edmonton Range Road 263	Interchange; Highway 16 exit 371; to Yellowhead Trail; Highway 60 southern terminus
1.000 mi = 1.609 km; 1.000 km = 0.621 mi
