= Parkland County =

Municipal district in Alberta, Canada

- Municipal district
- Logo

- Location within Alberta
- Coordinates: 53°31′48″N 114°00′23″W
- Country: Canada
- Province: Alberta
- Region: Edmonton Metropolitan Region
- Census division: 11
- Established: 1969
- Incorporated: 1969

Government
  - Mayor: Rod Shaigec
  - Governing body: Parkland County Council: Natalie Birnie; Allan William Hoefsloot; Phyllis Kobasiuk; Kristina Kowalski; Sally Kucher Johnson; Rob Wiedeman
  - CAO: Laura Swain
  - Administrative office: north of Stony Plain

Area (2021)
  - Land: 2,375.67 km^{2} (917.25 sq mi)

Population (2021)
  - Total: 32,205
  - Density: 13.6/km^{2} (35/sq mi)
- Time zone: UTC−06:00 (Alberta Time)
- Website: parklandcounty.com

Parkland County is a municipal district in central Alberta, Canada. Located west of Edmonton in Census Division No. 11, its municipal office, Parkland County Centre, is located 0.25 km (0.16 mi) north of the Town of Stony Plain on Highway 779.

== History ==
2021 wildfire

In May 2021, a wildfire, originating in Tomahawk, was reported. Evacuation orders, spanning from Highway 22 to the west, Township Road 524 to the north, Range Road 63 to the east, and Township Road 510 to the south, were issued on May 5.

== Geography ==
=== Communities and localities ===
The following urban municipalities are surrounded by Parkland County.

Cities

- Spruce Grove

Towns

- Stony Plain

Villages

- Spring Lake

Summer villages

- Betula Beach
- Kapasiwin
- Lakeview
- Point Alison
- Seba Beach

The following hamlets are located within Parkland County.

Hamlets

- Carvel
- Duffield
- Entwistle
- Fallis
- Gainford
- Keephills
- Tomahawk
- Wabamun

The following localities are located within Parkland County.

Localities

- Acheson
- Alpine Acres
- Amisk Acres
- Annaliesa Estates
- Anne Dale Acres
- Arrowhead Estates
- Ascot Beach
- Ashwood Meadows
- Aspen Estates
- Aspen Hills
- Avondale Acres
- Avondale Estates
- Banksiana Ranch
- Beach Corner
- Beach Corner Heights
- Beau Rand Estates
- Beaver Brook Park
- Beaverbrook
- Bell Acres
- Bergman Estates
- Birch Estates
- Birch Hill Park (designated place)
- Birch Hills
- Birch Street Estates
- Bonnie Acres
- Bowen Lake Estates
- Bridgewater Properties
- Brightbank
- Brightbank Estates
- Broken Wheel Ranches
- Brookside Estates
- Burtonsville
- Cameron Heights
- Cameron Lake Estates
- Canterbury Estates
- Carvel Corner
- Cedar Heights
- Central Heights
- Chateau Heights
- Chelsea Estates
- Cherlyn Heights
- Cheryl Heights
- Chickadoo Estates
- Chickakoo Estates
- Clear Lake Estates
- Clearwater Estates (designated place)
- Cole Anne Heights
- Cottage Lake Heights
- Country Lane Estates
- Crystal Meadows (designated place)
- Dartmoor Meadow
- Dawn Valley (designated place)
- Deer Lake Estates
- Deer Park
- Deer Park No. 1 Subdivision
- Deer Park No. 2 Subdivision
- Deer Park No. 3 Subdivision
- Delta Estates
- Devon Ridge Estates
- Devonshire Grove
- Devonshire Meadows (designated place)
- Double You Ranch
- Douglas Meadows
- Duffield Downs
- East Eighty Estates
- Eden Park Estates
- Edgemont Ridge
- Edgewood Acres
- Edinburgh Park
- Erin Estates (designated place)
- Eureka Beach
- Exelsior Park
- Falcon Hills
- Fernwood Estates
- Fleming Park (designated place)
- Forest Heights
- Freeman
- Garden Grove Estates (designated place)
- Gardner's Cove
- Genesse Park
- Glenwood Estates
- Glory Hills Estates
- Golden Acres
- Golden Spike
- Graminia
- Grand River Valley
- Grandmuir Estates (designated place)
- Green Acre Estates (designated place)
- Greenfield Acres
- Grove Acres
- Hacienda Estates
- Happy Acres
- Harder Acres
- Harris Acres
- Heatherlea
- Helenslea Estates
- Hennic Acres
- Highland Acres
- Highvale
- Hillside Estates
- Hilltop Acres
- Hillview Estates
- Holborn
- Horen
- Horizon West
- Hubbles Lake (designated place) or Hubble Lake Subdivision
- Huntington Heights
- Hycrest Place
- J. C.'s Ranch
- Jay Haven
- Jesperview Heights
- Johnny's Estates
- Johnny's Lake Estates
- Kathmarcan Estates
- Kilini Ridge
- Kolba Estates
- Kolga Estates
- Lake Country Estates
- Lake Crest
- Lake Isle Estates
- Lakeside Park
- Lamorr Landing Estates
- Landmark Estates
- Langford Park
- Lincolnshire Downs
- Linden Acres
- Magnolia
- Magnolia Bridge
- Mallard Park
- Manly
- Manly Corner
- Manuan Lake
- Marine Drive Estates
- Marra Kesh Estates
- Maude West
- Mayatan Lake Estates
- Mayfair Heights
- Meadow Crest
- Meadow Grove Estates
- Meadow Ridge
- Meadow Run
- Meadowview Park
- Meridian Estates
- Meso West (designated place) or Messo West
- Mewassin
- Michael Park
- Michel Park
- Millham Gardens
- Moon Lake
- Neutral Valley
- Norris Acres
- North Side Acres
- Northleigh
- Northridge Meadows
- Oakwood Estates
- Old Entwistle
- Osborne Acres (designated place)
- Panorama Heights (designated place)
- Paramac Cove
- Paramac Point
- Park Ridge Heights
- Parkland Heights
- Parkland Village
  - Parkland Village Trailer Ct. North
  - Parkland Village Trailer Ct. South
- Parklane Acres
- Parkview Estates
- Parmac Cove
- Parmac Point
- Partridge Heights
- Partridge Place
- Patricia Hills
- Peterburn Estates (designated place) or Peter Burn Estate
- Pine Valley Acres Subdivision
- Pinewood Subdivision
- Poplar Grove
- Prestige Heights
- Princess Estates
- Richie's Point
- Ridgewood Estates
- Riverview Acres
- Rizzie's Point
- Rolling Heights (designated place)
- Rolling Hills
- Rolling Meadows (designated place)
- Rolling View Estates
- Rosewood Beach
- Roslaire Estates
- Royal Park
- Sandy Heights
- Sandy Ridge
- Scenic View Estates
- Shady Acres
- Shannon Meadows
- Sherwin
- Silver Bell Estates
- Silver Bell Heights
- Silver Diamond Estates
- Silver Sands Estates
- Singer Acres
- Singing Hill Estates
- Skyline Gardens
- Smithfield
- Sorensens Park
- South Parkdale
- South Seba Beach
- South Woodland Acres
- Spanish Oaks
- Spring Hills
- Spruce Bluff
- Spruce Ridge
- Spruce Valley Estates
- Sprucehill Park
- Star Lake
- Star Lake Estates
- Stony Brook Gardens
- Stonybrook Gardens
- Summer View Heights
- Sundance Power Plant (designated place) or Sundance
- Sundance Meadows
- Sundown Estates
- Sunnyside Park
- Sunset View Acres (designated place)
- Surrey Lane Acreages
- Swiss Valley
- Terralta Estates
- Tower Acres
- Trafalgar Heights
- Tranquility Hills
- Twin Ravines
- Valaspen Place
- Viewpoint Estates
- Warnock Acres
- Weekend Estates
- Wendel Heights
- Wendel Place
- Wendel Place Park
- West Country Estates
- West Eighty Estates
- West Gentry Estates
- West Hill Acres
- West Lake Estates
- West Parkdale
- West Thirty-Five Estates
- Westbrooke Crescents (designated place) or Westbrook Crescent
- Westering Heights
- Westland Park
- Westward Acres
- Whispering Pines
- Whitewood Sands
- Wild Rose Park
- Willow Park
- Willow Ridge
- Willow Ridge Estates
- Winfield Heights
- Woodbend Crescent (designated place) or Woodbend Crescents
- Woodbend Place
- Woodland Acres
- Woodland Park (designated place)
- Woodridge
- Woodridge Estates
- Yellowhead Estates

Other places

- Westlake Estates (designated place)

== Demographics ==
In the 2021 Census of Population conducted by Statistics Canada, Parkland County had a population of 32,205 living in 11,914 of its 13,544 total private dwellings, a change of −1.6% from its 2016 population of 32,737. With a land area of 2,375.67 km^{2} (917.25 sq mi), it had a population density of 13.6/km^{2} (35.1/sq mi) in 2021.

In the 2016 Census of Population conducted by Statistics Canada, Parkland County had a population of 32,097 living in 11,615 of its 12,910 total private dwellings, a 5% change from its 2011 population of 30,568. With a land area of 2,390.23 km^{2} (922.87 sq mi), it had a population density of 13.4/km^{2} (34.8/sq mi) in 2016.

== Economy ==
Parkland County's economic development hub is the Acheson Industrial Area. Its 4,000 hectares (9,900 acres) of land is home to over 200 businesses.

== Attractions ==
- Wagner Natural Area
- Clifford E. Lee Nature Sanctuary
- University of Alberta Botanic Garden
- Numerous golf courses
- Lakes: Jackfish Lake, Hasse Lake, Wabaman Lake
- Regional Parks and Campgrounds: Chickakoo Lake Park, KoKoMoKo, Ascot Beach Park, Rich's Point Park, Muir Lake Park, Constable Chelsey Robinson Day Use Park
- Wabamun Provincial Park
- Pembina River Provincial Park

== See also ==
- List of communities in Alberta
- List of municipal districts in Alberta
