= List of localities in Alberta =

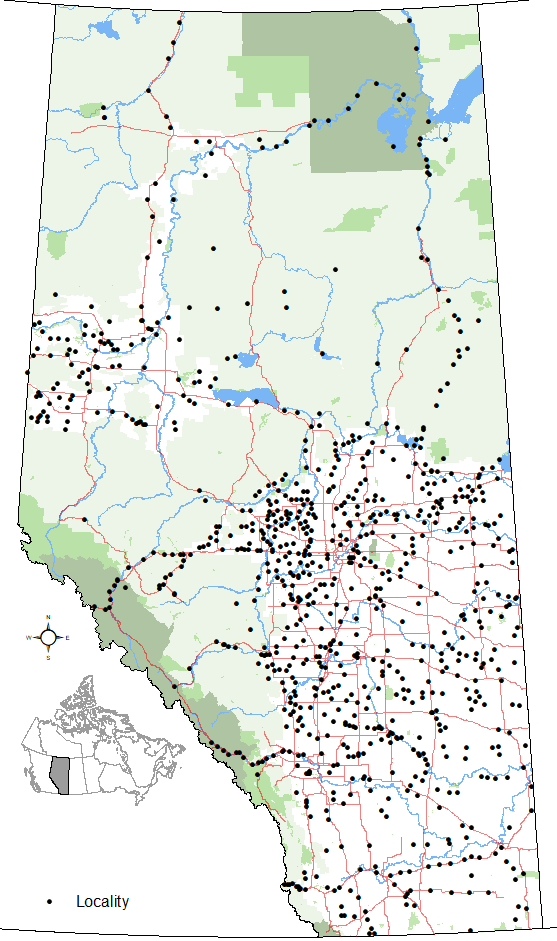
Distribution of the 864 localities in Alberta's Geographical Names System

A locality, in general, is a place that is settled by humans. In the Canadian province of Alberta, a locality is an unincorporated place, community, or area with a limited or scattered population, with boundaries that "are often undefined". Localities cover a diversity of items, including: industrial areas, such as Acheson; residential acreage developments, such as McDermott; trailer parks, such as Branch Inn Trailer Court in Yellowhead County; mixed-use roadside stops, such as Beach Corner; residential neighbourhoods in large cities that are considered part of a historic or planning area, such as Mount Royal; long ago settlements that have devolved back into farmland, such as Connor Creek; and others.

Alberta had 864 localities within its Geographical Names System (GNS) in October 2020. Excluding municipalities, hamlets, and airports, Statistics Canada recognized 2,342 localities in Alberta in its 2006 Census of Population, of which 830 are also in Alberta's GNS. Between the two authorities there are 2,372 localities in Alberta.

== List ==
List of localities in Alberta
Name	Location	Authority	
Name	Location	Alberta's Geographical Names System	Statistics Canada (2006)
Abilene	County of St. Paul No. 19	Yes	Yes
Academy	Calgary		Yes
Acadia	Municipal District of Acadia No. 34		Yes
Acheson	Parkland County	Yes	Yes
Adam Lily Acres	Strathcona County		Yes
Adams Landing	Mackenzie County	Yes	Yes
Aden	County of Forty Mile No. 8	Yes	Yes
Aerial	Drumheller		Yes
Agatha	Cypress County	Yes	Yes
Aggie	Big Lakes County		Yes
Agriculture Research	Lethbridge County		Yes
Airways	Municipal District of Provost No. 52		Yes
Akenside	Strathcona County	Yes	Yes
Akenside Estates	Strathcona County		Yes
Albert Park	Calgary		Yes
Alberta Hospital	Ponoka County		Yes
Albion Ridge	Lethbridge County		Yes
Albright	County of Grande Prairie No. 1	Yes	Yes
Alcurve	County of Vermilion River	Yes	Yes
Alder Heights	Foothills County		Yes
Alderson	Cypress County	Yes	Yes
Alexander	Alexander 134		Yes
Alexo	Clearwater County	Yes	Yes
Alix South Junction	Lacombe County	Yes	Yes
Allandale Estates	Rocky View County		Yes
Allingham	Kneehill County	Yes	Yes
Almac Subdivision	Regional Municipality of Wood Buffalo		Yes
Alness	Special Area No. 2	Yes	Yes
Alpen	Thorhild County		Yes
Alpen Siding	Thorhild County	Yes	Yes
Alpine Acres	Parkland County		Yes
Alsike	Brazeau County	Yes	Yes
Altadore	Calgary		Yes
Amarillo Park	Leduc County		Yes
Amber Valley	Athabasca County	Yes	Yes
Amelia	Sturgeon County	Yes	Yes
Amesbury	Athabasca County	Yes	Yes
Amisk Acres	Parkland County		Yes
Amundson	Municipal District of Greenview No. 16		Yes
Analta	Westlock County	Yes	Yes
Anastasia	Vulcan County	Yes	Yes
Anatapy	Rocky View County		Yes
Anatole	Special Area No. 3		Yes
Anchor Farms	Leduc County		Yes
Ancona	Clearwater County	Yes	Yes
Anderson Addition	County of Stettler No. 6		Yes
Angle Lake	County of Two Hills No. 21	Yes	Yes
Ankerton	Flagstaff County	Yes	Yes
Annaliesa Estates	Parkland County		Yes
Anne Dale Acres	Parkland County		Yes
Anning	County of St. Paul No. 19	Yes	Yes
Ansell	Yellowhead County	Yes	Yes
Anselmo	Woodlands County	Yes	Yes
Anshaw	Municipal District of Bonnyville No. 87	Yes	Yes
Anthracite	Improvement District No. 9	Yes	Yes
Anton Lake	Westlock County	Yes	Yes
Antonio	Municipal District of Taber	Yes	Yes
Antross	Brazeau County	Yes	Yes
Arcadia	Sucker Creek 150A		Yes
Arcs, Lac des	Municipal District of Bighorn No. 8		Yes
Arddmoor-Rosswood	Strathcona County		Yes
Ardea Park	Lac Ste. Anne County		Yes
Ardenode	Wheatland County	Yes	Yes
Ardenville	Municipal District of Willow Creek No. 26	Yes	Yes
Ardmoor	Strathcona County		Yes
Armada	Vulcan County	Yes	Yes
Armelgra	Municipal District of Taber		Yes
Armistice	County of St. Paul No. 19	Yes	Yes
Army Experimental Range	Cypress County		Yes
Arndt Acres	Lac Ste. Anne County		Yes
Arneson	Municipal District of Acadia No. 34	Yes	Yes
Arrowhead Estates	Parkland County		Yes
Artesian Estates	Strathcona County		Yes
Artists View East Subdivision	Rocky View County		Yes
Artists View West Subdivision	Rocky View County		Yes
Arvilla	Westlock County	Yes	Yes
Ascot Heights	Municipal District of Wainwright No. 61		Yes
Ashwood Meadows	Parkland County		Yes
Aspen Acres	County of Wetaskiwin No. 10		Yes
Aspen Beach	Lacombe County	Yes	Yes
Aspen Beach	Lacombe County		Yes
Aspen Creek Estates	Foothills County		Yes
Aspen Estates	Beaver County		Yes
Aspen Estates	Parkland County		Yes
Aspen Grove	Municipal District of Greenview No. 16		Yes
Aspen Heights	Strathcona County		Yes
Aspen Hills	Lac Ste. Anne County		Yes
Aspen Hills	Parkland County		Yes
Aspen Ridge Estates	County of Grande Prairie No. 1		Yes
Aspen Ridge Subdivision	County of Grande Prairie No. 1		Yes
Aspen View	Strathcona County		Yes
Assineau	Municipal District of Lesser Slave River No. 124	Yes	Yes
Assumption	Hay Lake 209	Yes	Yes
Athabasca Acres	Athabasca County		Yes
Athabasca Falls	Improvement District No. 12		Yes
Athabasca Landing Settlement	Athabasca County		Yes
Atikameg	Utikoomak Lake 155	Yes	Yes
Atikamisis Lake Settlement	Northern Sunrise County		Yes
Atlee	Special Area No. 2	Yes	Yes
Auburndale	Municipal District of Wainwright No. 61	Yes	Yes
Aurora Place	Strathcona County		Yes
Austin Acres	Sturgeon County		Yes
Avalon	County of Forty Mile No. 8		Yes
Avenir	Lac La Biche County	Yes	Yes
Avery Park	Strathcona County		Yes
Avondale Acres	Parkland County		Yes
Avondale Estates	Parkland County		Yes
Azure	Foothills County	Yes	Yes
Bad Heart	County of Grande Prairie No. 1	Yes	Yes
Badlands No. 7	Drumheller		Yes
Bain	Cypress County	Yes	Yes
Baintree	Wheatland County	Yes	Yes
Balay Subdivision	Athabasca County		Yes
Balkan	Yellowhead County		Yes
Ball Meadows	Strathcona County		Yes
Ball Trailer Park	Oyen		Yes
Ballantine	Lac Ste. Anne County	Yes	Yes
Ballater	Municipal District of Smoky River No. 130		Yes
Balm	Lac Ste. Anne County	Yes	Yes
Balmoral	Red Deer County		Yes
Balsam Grove	Thorhild County		Yes
Banana Belt	Big Lakes County	Yes	
Banded Peak Place	Rocky View County		Yes
Banff National Park	Improvement District No. 9		Yes
Bank Bay	Municipal District of Bonnyville No. 87	Yes	Yes
Bankhead	Improvement District No. 9	Yes	Yes
Banko Junction	Sturgeon County		Yes
Banksiana Ranch	Parkland County		Yes
Bantry	County of Newell	Yes	Yes
Baptiste Lake	Athabasca County	Yes	Yes
Baptiste River	Clearwater County	Yes	Yes
Bardo	Beaver County	Yes	Yes
Bargrave	Kneehill County	Yes	Yes
Barich	Smoky Lake County	Yes	Yes
Barlee Junction	Camrose County	Yes	Yes
Barlow	Calgary		Yes
Barlow Junction	Calgary		Yes
Barnegat	Lac La Biche County	Yes	Yes
Barney	Municipal District of Taber		Yes
Baronwood	Strathcona County		Yes
Bartstow	Siksika 146	Yes	Yes
Basing	Yellowhead County		Yes
Batter Junction	Special Area No. 2	Yes	Yes
Battle	Camrose County		Yes
Battle Bend	Flagstaff County	Yes	Yes
Battle Lake	County of Wetaskiwin No. 10	Yes	Yes
Battle Ridge	Municipal District of Provost No. 52		Yes
Battle River	County of Paintearth No. 18		Yes
Bay Bridge Park	Lac Ste. Anne County		Yes
Bay Tree	Saddle Hills County	Yes	Yes
Bayview Beach	County of St. Paul No. 19	Yes	Yes
Beach Corner	Parkland County	Yes	Yes
Beach Corner Heights	Parkland County		Yes
Beachside Estates	County of Wetaskiwin No. 10		Yes
Beacon Corner	Municipal District of Bonnyville No. 87	Yes	Yes
Bear Canyon	Clear Hills County	Yes	Yes
Bear Lake	County of Grande Prairie No. 1		Yes
Bearberry	Mountain View County		Yes
Bearspan Heights	Rocky View County		Yes
Bearspaw	Rocky View County	Yes	Yes
Beau Rand Estates	Parkland County		Yes
Beau Vista North	Leduc County		Yes
Beau Vista South	Leduc County		Yes
Beaver Brook Estates	Strathcona County		Yes
Beaver Brook Park	Parkland County		Yes
Beaver Creek Estates	Beaver County		Yes
Beaver Estates	Brazeau County		Yes
Beaver Lake-Young's Beach	Lac La Biche County		Yes
Beaver Meadow Estates	Beaver County		Yes
Beaver River	Municipal District of Bonnyville No. 87	Yes	Yes
Beaver Valley Estates	Strathcona County		Yes
Beaverbrook	Parkland County		Yes
Beaverhill	Lamont County	Yes	Yes
Beaverhill Estates	Beaver County		Yes
Bechtel Syncrude Camp	Regional Municipality of Wood Buffalo		Yes
Beck Estates	Strathcona County		Yes
Beddington	Calgary		Yes
Bedson	Jasper		Yes
Behan	Lac La Biche County	Yes	Yes
Bel-Aire	Calgary		Yes
Bell Acres	Parkland County		Yes
Bellcott	Cypress County		Yes
Bellevue	Crowsnest Pass	Yes	Yes
Bellevue Subdivision	County of St. Paul No. 19		Yes
Belloy	Birch Hills County	Yes	Yes
Bellshill	Flagstaff County	Yes	Yes
Belvedere	County of Barrhead No. 11	Yes	Yes
Belvedere Heights	Strathcona County		Yes
Belvedere Heights East	Strathcona County		Yes
Belvedere Heights West	Strathcona County		Yes
Benbow	Woodlands County		Yes
Bennett	Rocky View County	Yes	Yes
Benton	Special Area No. 3	Yes	Yes
Benton Station	Special Area No. 3		Yes
Benville	Sexsmith, Alberta		Yes
Berdinskies	Regional Municipality of Wood Buffalo	Yes	Yes
Bergen	Mountain View County	Yes	Yes
Bergman Estates	Parkland County		Yes
Berkinshaw	Flagstaff County	Yes	Yes
Berny	Regional Municipality of Wood Buffalo		Yes
Berry Creek	Special Area No. 2	Yes	Yes
Berry Hill	Strathcona County		Yes
Berrymoor	Brazeau County	Yes	Yes
Best Estates	Strathcona County		Yes
Bevan Estates	County of Wetaskiwin No. 10		Yes
Beverly	Edmonton		Yes
Beverly Hills	Strathcona County		Yes
Beynon	Kneehill County	Yes	Yes
Bickerdike	Yellowhead County	Yes	Yes
Big Coulee	Athabasca County	Yes	Yes
Big Eddy	Regional Municipality of Wood Buffalo		Yes
Big Lake Estates	Edmonton		Yes
Big Meadow	Municipal District of Bonnyville No. 87	Yes	Yes
Big Prairie	Big Lakes County		Yes
Big Prairie Settlement	Big Lakes County		Yes
Big Slough	Improvement District No. 24	Yes	Yes
Big Stone	Special Area No. 3	Yes	Yes
Bilby	Lac Ste. Anne County	Yes	Yes
Billos	Regional Municipality of Wood Buffalo		Yes
Bingen	County of Forty Mile No. 8		Yes
Bingley	Clearwater County	Yes	Yes
Birch Bay	Lacombe County		Yes
Birch Estates	Parkland County		Yes
Birch Field Estates	Brazeau County		Yes
Birch Grove Estates	Beaver County		Yes
Birch Grove Estates	Municipal District of Bonnyville No. 87		Yes
Birch Hill Park	Parkland County		Yes
Birch Hills	Parkland County		Yes
Birch Park	Strathcona County		Yes
Birch Street Estates	Parkland County		Yes
Birchland Resort	Smoky Lake County		Yes
Birchwood Estates	Lac Ste. Anne County		Yes
Birchwood Village	Strathcona County		Yes
Birchwood Village Greens	Brazeau County		Yes
Birdsholm	County of Forty Mile No. 8		Yes
Bison Lake	Northern Sunrise County	Yes	Yes
Bissell	Edmonton		Yes
Bitumount	Regional Municipality of Wood Buffalo	Yes	Yes
Blacktail	Municipal District of Willow Creek No. 26		Yes
Blairmore	Crowsnest Pass	Yes	Yes
Blavney	Barons		Yes
Blissful Beach	Sunbreaker Cove		Yes
Blooming Prairie	Morrin		Yes
Bloomsbury	County of Barrhead No. 11	Yes	Yes
Blue Jay	Athabasca County		Yes
Blueberry Mountain	Saddle Hills County	Yes	Yes
Blumenau	Stettler		Yes
Blumenort	Mackenzie County	Yes	
Boggy Hall	Brazeau County	Yes	Yes
Boian	County of Two Hills No. 21		Yes
Bolin Subdivision	County of Stettler No. 6		Yes
Bonanza	Saddle Hills County	Yes	Yes
Bonar	Special Area No. 2	Yes	Yes
Bone Town	Lac La Biche County		Yes
Bonlea	Flagstaff County	Yes	Yes
Bonnie Acres	Parkland County		Yes
Bonnie Lake Resort	Smoky Lake County		Yes
Bordenave	Municipal District of Bonnyville No. 87		Yes
Borradaile	County of Vermilion River	Yes	Yes
Boscombe	County of St. Paul No. 19	Yes	Yes
Botten	Municipal District of Greenview No. 16		Yes
Boundary Creek	Cardston County		Yes
Bouteiller Subdivision	Red Deer County		Yes
Boutellier Subdivision	Red Deer County		Yes
Bow City	County of Newell		Yes
Bow Valley Park	Kananaskis Improvement District		Yes
Bowell	Cypress County		Yes
Bowen Lake Estates	Parkland County		Yes
Bowmanton	Cypress County	Yes	Yes
Bowness	Calgary		Yes
Boyer	Mackenzie County		Yes
Boyer River Settlement	Mackenzie County		Yes
Boyer Settlement	Mackenzie County		Yes
Boyne Lake	County of St. Paul No. 19	Yes	Yes
Braaten	Municipal District of Greenview No. 16		Yes
Bradshaw	Cardston County		Yes
Braeburn	Saddle Hills County	Yes	Yes
Braemore Ranch	Rocky View County		Yes
Braim	Camrose County	Yes	Yes
Brainard	County of Grande Prairie No. 1	Yes	Yes
Branch Inn Trailer Court	Yellowhead County		Yes
Braun Village	Sturgeon County		Yes
Brazeau	Clearwater County		Yes
Brazeau Dam	Brazeau County	Yes	Yes
Breage	Vermilion		Yes
Brecken Wood	Strathcona County		Yes
Bredin	County of Grande Prairie No. 1		Yes
Bremner	Strathcona County		Yes
Brenda Vista	Leduc County		Yes
Brentwood	Calgary		Yes
Bretona	Strathcona County	Yes	Yes
Bretville Junction	Strathcona County		Yes
Brickburn	Calgary		Yes
Bridgeland	Calgary		Yes
Bridgeview	Municipal District of Spirit River No. 133	Yes	Yes
Bridgewater Properties	Parkland County		Yes
Briereville	Lac La Biche County	Yes	Yes
Briereville	Regional Municipality of Wood Buffalo		Yes
Briggs	Red Deer County	Yes	Yes
Brightbank	Parkland County	Yes	Yes
Brightbank Estates	Parkland County		Yes
Brighton Beach	Lacombe County		Yes
Brightview	County of Wetaskiwin No. 10	Yes	Yes
Bristol Estates	Strathcona County		Yes
Britannia	Calgary		Yes
Brocket	Piikani 147	Yes	Yes
Broderson Subdivision	Red Deer County		Yes
Brodersons Subdivision	Red Deer County		Yes
Broken Wheel Ranches	Parkland County		Yes
Brook	Lacombe County		Yes
Brookside Estates	Parkland County		Yes
Brookville Estates	Strathcona County		Yes
Brookwood Estates	County of Minburn No. 27		Yes
Brower Subdivision	Clearwater County		Yes
Brownlee Acreage	Red Deer County		Yes
Broxburn	Lethbridge County	Yes	Yes
Bruederheim	Lamont County		Yes
Brule Mines	Yellowhead County		Yes
Brûlé Mines	Yellowhead County		Yes
Bryan	Yellowhead County		Yes
Buffalo	Special Area No. 2	Yes	Yes
Buffalo Head Prairie	Mackenzie County	Yes	Yes
Buffalo Lake	County of Grande Prairie No. 1	Yes	Yes
Buffalo Lake Metis Settlement	Smoky Lake County		Yes
Buffalo View	Municipal District of Provost No. 52	Yes	Yes
Bullocksville	Lacombe County		Yes
Bullpound	Special Area No. 2	Yes	Yes
Bulls Head	Cypress County		Yes
Bullshead	Cypress County	Yes	Yes
Bulwark	County of Paintearth No. 18	Yes	Yes
Buoyant	Kneehill County	Yes	Yes
Burbank	Lacombe County		Yes
Burfield	Special Area No. 2		Yes
Burmis	Municipal District of Pincher Creek No. 9	Yes	Yes
Burnt Lake	Red Deer County		Yes
Burtonsville	Parkland County	Yes	Yes
Busenius Estates	Strathcona County		Yes
Bushy Head Corner	Municipal District of Wainwright No. 61	Yes	Yes
Butte	Clearwater County	Yes	Yes
Butze	Municipal District of Wainwright No. 61		Yes
Cabin Lake	Special Area No. 3	Yes	Yes
Cache Lake	Smoky Lake County		Yes
Cadron	Smoky Lake County		Yes
Cairns	Municipal District of Provost No. 52	Yes	Yes
Calais	Sturgeon Lake 154	Yes	Yes
Caldbeck	Rocky View County		Yes
Caldwell	Cardston County		Yes
Calebo Estates	Strathcona County		Yes
Calling Horse Estates	Rocky View County		Yes
Calling River	Municipal District of Opportunity No. 17	Yes	Yes
Calmar Mobile Home Park	Calmar		Yes
Calthorpe	Special Area No. 3	Yes	Yes
Calvert	Yellowhead County		Yes
Cam-Bar Estates	County of Barrhead No. 11		Yes
Cambria	Drumheller	Yes	Yes
Cambrian Heights	Calgary		Yes
Camelot Square	Strathcona County		Yes
Cameron Cove	County of St. Paul No. 19		Yes
Cameron Heights	Parkland County		Yes
Cameron Lake Estates	Parkland County		Yes
Cameron Park	Sturgeon County		Yes
Camp Creek	County of Barrhead No. 11	Yes	Yes
Camp Gardner	Rocky View County		Yes
Camp Horizon	Kananaskis Improvement District		Yes
Camp Sarcee	Calgary		Yes
Campbell	County of Newell		Yes
Campbell	Edmonton		Yes
Campbell Park	Edmonton		Yes
Campbelltown	Strathcona County		Yes
Campbelltown Heights	Strathcona County		Yes
Campbelton	Camrose County		Yes
Campsie Cove	County of Barrhead No. 11		Yes
Cannell	Edmonton		Yes
Canterbury Estates	Parkland County		Yes
Canyon Heights	Red Deer County		Yes
Capitol Hill	Calgary		Yes
Cappon	Special Area No. 3	Yes	Yes
Caprona	County of Stettler No. 6	Yes	Yes
Caravelle Estates	Foothills County		Yes
Carcajou	County of Northern Lights	Yes	Yes
Carcajou Settlement	Mackenzie County		Yes
Cardiff-Echoes	Sturgeon County		Yes
Cardiff-Pittsburgh	Sturgeon County		Yes
Cardinal Point	Northern Sunrise County		Yes
Carlos	Clearwater County	Yes	Yes
Carlson Landing	Improvement District No. 24	Yes	Yes
Carlsons Landing	Improvement District No. 24		Yes
Carlstadt	Cypress County		Yes
Carnwood	Brazeau County	Yes	Yes
Carolside	Special Area No. 2	Yes	Yes
Carriage Lane	Strathcona County		Yes
Carrot Creek	Yellowhead County	Yes	Yes
Caruso	Wheatland County		Yes
Carvel Corner	Parkland County	Yes	Yes
Casa Vista	Sturgeon County		Yes
Cassils	County of Newell		Yes
Castle Junction	Improvement District No. 9	Yes	Yes
Castle Mountain	Improvement District No. 9		Yes
Caswellem	Strathcona County		Yes
Cavendish	Special Area No. 2	Yes	Yes
Caywood Estates	Leduc County		Yes
Cecil	Cypress County	Yes	Yes
Cedar Heights	Parkland County		Yes
Central Heights	Parkland County		Yes
Central Park	Red Deer County		Yes
Centre Calling Lake	Municipal District of Opportunity No. 17		Yes
Century Estates	Athabasca County		Yes
Century Estates	Strathcona County		Yes
Century Meadows	Strathcona County		Yes
Chailey	County of Minburn No. 27	Yes	Yes
Chapel Rock	Municipal District of Pincher Creek No. 9	Yes	Yes
Chard	Regional Municipality of Wood Buffalo	Yes	
Charleswood	Calgary		Yes
Charron	Regional Municipality of Wood Buffalo		Yes
Chateau Heights	Parkland County		Yes
Chateh	Hay Lake 209	Yes	Yes
Chedderville	Clearwater County	Yes	Yes
Cheecham	Regional Municipality of Wood Buffalo	Yes	Yes
Chelsea Estates	Parkland County		Yes
Cheneka	Stoney 142, 143, 144		Yes
Cherlyn Heights	Parkland County		Yes
Cherry Point	Clear Hills County	Yes	Yes
Cherry Ridge Estates	Municipal District of Bonnyville No. 87		Yes
Cheryl Heights	Parkland County		Yes
Cheviot Hills	Lac Ste. Anne County		Yes
Cheyenne Estates	Lac Ste. Anne County		Yes
Chickadoo Estates	Parkland County		Yes
Chickakoo Estates	Parkland County		Yes
Chief Mountain	Improvement District No. 4		Yes
Chigwell	Lacombe County	Yes	Yes
Chinook Valley	County of Northern Lights	Yes	Yes
Chip Lake	Yellowhead County	Yes	Yes
Chipewyan Lake	Municipal District of Opportunity No. 17	Yes	Yes
Chisholm Mills	Municipal District of Lesser Slave River No. 124	Yes	Yes
Chokio	Piikani 147	Yes	Yes
Chrenek Acres	Strathcona County		Yes
Chrenek Estates	Strathcona County		Yes
Christina Crossing	Regional Municipality of Wood Buffalo	Yes	Yes
Cinnamon Ridge Estates	Beaver County		Yes
Circle Five	Rocky View County		Yes
Claireridge Estates	Strathcona County		Yes
Clairmont Trailer Court	County of Grande Prairie No. 1		Yes
Clarinda	County of Warner No. 5		Yes
Clarkdale Meadows	Strathcona County		Yes
Clarkson Valley	Municipal District of Greenview No. 16	Yes	Yes
Clarksville	County of St. Paul No. 19		Yes
Claysmore	County of Vermilion River		Yes
Clear Hills	County of Northern Lights		Yes
Clear Lake Estates	Parkland County		Yes
Clear Prairie	Clear Hills County	Yes	Yes
Clearbrook	Thorhild County	Yes	Yes
Clearview Acres	Sturgeon County		Yes
Clearwater Estates	Parkland County		Yes
Clearwater Subdivision	Clearwater County		Yes
Cleverville	Champion		Yes
Cline River	Clearwater County	Yes	Yes
Cline Settlement	Clearwater County		Yes
Clivale	Special Area No. 2		Yes
Clover Bar	Strathcona County		Yes
Clover Lawn	Leduc County	Yes	
Clover Park	Fort Saskatchewan		Yes
Cloverlawn Estates	Leduc County		Yes
Cloverlea	Strathcona County		Yes
Coal Valley	Yellowhead County	Yes	Yes
Coalbanks	Red Deer County		Yes
Coalspur	Yellowhead County	Yes	Yes
Codesa	Birch Hills County	Yes	Yes
Codner	Clearwater County	Yes	Yes
Coghill	Lacombe County	Yes	Yes
Cold Lake, Canadian Forces Base	Cold Lake		Yes
Cole Anne Heights	Parkland County		Yes
Coleman	Crowsnest Pass	Yes	Yes
College Heights	Lacombe	Yes	Yes
College Park	Red Deer		Yes
Colles	Cardston County		Yes
Collicutt	Crossfield		Yes
Collingwood	Calgary		Yes
Colonel Younger Estates	Strathcona County		Yes
Colonial Estates	Strathcona County		Yes
Colpitts Ranch Subdivision	Rocky View County		Yes
Columbine	Municipal District of Bonnyville No. 87		Yes
Comet	Special Area No. 2	Yes	Yes
Commerce	Lethbridge County		Yes
Comrey	County of Forty Mile No. 8		Yes
Congresbury	Clearwater County	Yes	Yes
Conjuring Creek	Leduc County	Yes	Yes
Connemara	Municipal District of Willow Creek No. 26	Yes	Yes
Connor Creek	Lac Ste. Anne County		Yes
Conrad	County of Warner No. 5	Yes	Yes
Control	County of Newell		Yes
Cooking Lake	Strathcona County	Yes	Yes
Coolidge	Athabasca County	Yes	Yes
Coop Trailer Park	County of Vermilion River		Yes
Cooperville	Hanna		Yes
Corbett Creek	Woodlands County	Yes	Yes
Corbetts	Regional Municipality of Wood Buffalo		Yes
Cordel	County of Paintearth No. 18	Yes	Yes
Cork	County of St. Paul No. 19		Yes
Coronado	Sturgeon County	Yes	Yes
Corsair Cove Subdivision	Lac Ste. Anne County		Yes
Cosmo	Lac Ste. Anne County	Yes	Yes
Cossack	Smoky Lake County		Yes
Cosway	Kneehill County	Yes	Yes
Cosy Cove	Municipal District of Greenview No. 16	Yes	
Cotillion	Saddle Hills County	Yes	
Cottage Lake Heights	Parkland County		Yes
Cottonwood Subdivision	Brazeau County		Yes
Countess	County of Newell	Yes	Yes
Country Classic Estates	Brazeau County		Yes
Country Club Estates	Strathcona County		Yes
Country Estates	Rocky View County		Yes
Country Lane Estates	Parkland County		Yes
Country Squire	Beaver County		Yes
Country Style Trailer Court	Brazeau County		Yes
Cousins	Medicine Hat		Yes
Cousins	Municipal District of Provost No. 52	Yes	Yes
Craddock	County of Warner No. 5	Yes	Yes
Craigavon	Strathcona County		Yes
Craigdhu	Rocky View County	Yes	Yes
Craigend	Lac La Biche County	Yes	Yes
Craigmillar	Municipal District of Provost No. 52	Yes	Yes
Craigower	Cypress County		Yes
Crammond	Clearwater County	Yes	Yes
Cranford	Municipal District of Taber	Yes	Yes
Cranston Place	Strathcona County		Yes
Creekland	Leduc County	Yes	Yes
Cressday	Cypress County	Yes	Yes
Crestomere	Ponoka County	Yes	Yes
Crestview Beach	County of St. Paul No. 19		Yes
Crestview Heights	Sturgeon County		Yes
Crimson Lake	Clearwater County	Yes	Yes
Crippsdale	Thorhild County	Yes	Yes
Croftland	Strathcona County		Yes
Crooked Creek	Municipal District of Greenview No. 16	Yes	Yes
Crowchild	Tsuut'ina 145	Yes	Yes
Crowell	Municipal District of Smoky River No. 130		Yes
Crowfoot	Wheatland County		Yes
Crowsnest	Crowsnest Pass		Yes
Croxford Estates	Rocky View County		Yes
Crystal Meadows	Parkland County		Yes
Cullen Creek	Rocky View County		Yes
Culp	Municipal District of Smoky River No. 130	Yes	Yes
Cummings	County of Minburn No. 27		Yes
Curilane Beach	County of Wetaskiwin No. 10		Yes
Curlew	Kneehill County	Yes	Yes
Cygnet	Red Deer County	Yes	Yes
Dakin	Athabasca County		Yes
Dalehurst	Yellowhead County		Yes
Dalmuir	Thorhild County		Yes
Dalum	Wheatland County	Yes	Yes
Danube	Thorhild County	Yes	Yes
Darbyson Estates	Lac Ste. Anne County		Yes
Darling	Thorhild County		Yes
Dartmoor Meadow	Parkland County		Yes
Darwell	Lac Ste. Anne County	Yes	Yes
Darwell Rolling Woods	Lac Ste. Anne County		Yes
Dasmarinas Estates	Strathcona County		Yes
Dawn Valley	Parkland County		Yes
De Winton Heights	Foothills County		Yes
Dead Man Flat	Municipal District of Bighorn No. 8		Yes
Decoigne	Jasper	Yes	Yes
Decrene	Municipal District of Lesser Slave River No. 124		Yes
Deeney	Westlock County		Yes
Deep Creek	Athabasca County	Yes	Yes
Deer Hill	Clear Hills County	Yes	Yes
Deer Horn Estates	Strathcona County		Yes
Deer Lake Estates	Parkland County		Yes
Deer Park	Parkland County		Yes
Deer Park No. 1 Subdivision	Parkland County		Yes
Deer Park No. 2 Subdivision	Parkland County		Yes
Deer Park No. 3 Subdivision	Parkland County		Yes
Deer Ridge Estates	Lacombe County		Yes
Deer Ridge Park Subdivision	Lac La Biche County		Yes
Deerland	Lamont County		Yes
Deerwood Estates	Rocky View County		Yes
Delaney	Lacombe County		Yes
Delph	Lamont County	Yes	Yes
Del-Rich Meadows	Rocky View County		Yes
Delta Estates	Parkland County		Yes
Demay	Camrose County	Yes	Yes
Denard	Municipal District of Greenview No. 16		Yes
Denhart	County of Newell	Yes	Yes
Dennis	Cypress County		Yes
Denwood	Municipal District of Wainwright No. 61	Yes	Yes
Desjarlais	County of Two Hills No. 21		Yes
Desmarais	Municipal District of Opportunity No. 17	Yes	
Devenish	Lac La Biche County	Yes	Yes
Deville	Strathcona County	Yes	Yes
Devon Ridge Estates	Parkland County		Yes
Devona	Improvement District No. 12	Yes	Yes
Devonshire Grove	Parkland County		Yes
Devonshire Meadows	Parkland County		Yes
Dewdney	Okotoks		Yes
Diana	County of Wetaskiwin No. 10		Yes
Dina	County of Vermilion River	Yes	Yes
Dinant	Camrose County	Yes	Yes
Dinosaur	Starland County		Yes
Dirleton	Municipal District of Bonnyville No. 87		Yes
Diss	Yellowhead County		Yes
Dixon Crescent	Strathcona County		Yes
Dixon Place	Strathcona County		Yes
Doan	Red Deer County	Yes	Yes
Dobson	Special Area No. 3		Yes
Dodds	Beaver County	Yes	Yes
Dog Head	Regional Municipality of Wood Buffalo		Yes
Dogpound	Mountain View County	Yes	Yes
Donaldson Park	Strathcona County		Yes
Dorenlee	Camrose County		Yes
Doris	Woodlands County	Yes	Yes
Dorscheid	Municipal District of Greenview No. 16		Yes
Double You Ranch	Parkland County		Yes
Douglas Meadows	Parkland County		Yes
Dover Estates	Sturgeon County		Yes
Dovercourt	Clearwater County	Yes	Yes
Dowling	Special Area No. 2		Yes
Dowling Estates	Strathcona County		Yes
Dowling Lake	Starland County	Yes	Yes
Downing	Smoky Lake County		Yes
Draper	Regional Municipality of Wood Buffalo	Yes	Yes
Dream Hollow Estates	Sturgeon County		Yes
Dream Nook	Sturgeon County		Yes
Dreau	Municipal District of Smoky River No. 130		Yes
Dried Meat Lake	Camrose County		Yes
Driftpile	Driftpile River 150	Yes	Yes
Drinnan	Yellowhead County		Yes
Drywood	Municipal District of Pincher Creek No. 9		Yes
Duagh	Sturgeon County	Yes	Yes
Duffield Downs	Parkland County		Yes
Dunbar	Strathcona County		Yes
Dunn	Municipal District of Wainwright No. 61	Yes	Yes
Dunphy	Kneehill County	Yes	Yes
Dunshalt	Wheatland County	Yes	Yes
Dunstable	County of Barrhead No. 11	Yes	Yes
Dunvegan	Municipal District of Fairview No. 136	Yes	Yes
Dunvegan Settlement	Saddle Hills County		Yes
Dunvegan Yards	Edmonton		Yes
Durlingville	Municipal District of Bonnyville No. 87	Yes	Yes
Durward	Municipal District of Willow Creek No. 26		Yes
Dusseldorf	County of Barrhead No. 11		Yes
Duthil	Improvement District No. 9	Yes	Yes
Duxbury	Forestburg		Yes
Eagle Butte	Cypress County	Yes	Yes
Eagle Hill	Mountain View County	Yes	Yes
Eagle Lake	Wheatland County		Yes
Eagle Ridge	Calgary		Yes
Earlie	County of Vermilion River		Yes
Early Gardens	Municipal District of Peace No. 135	Yes	Yes
East Coulee	Drumheller	Yes	Yes
East Edmonton	Strathcona County		Yes
East Eighty Estates	Parkland County		Yes
East Gate Trailers	Improvement District No. 12		Yes
East Grove	Municipal District of Greenview No. 16		Yes
East Kootenay	Crowsnest Pass		Yes
East Prairie	Big Lakes County		Yes
East Prairie Metis Settlement	Big Lakes County		Yes
East Whitecroft	Strathcona County		Yes
Eastburg	Westlock County	Yes	Yes
Eastgate	Sturgeon County		Yes
Easton Acres	Strathcona County		Yes
Eastview Acres	Lethbridge County		Yes
Eastwood Estates	Strathcona County		Yes
Easyford	Brazeau County	Yes	Yes
Ebeling Beach	Lacombe County		Yes
Edda Vista	Leduc County		Yes
Eden Park Estates	Parkland County		Yes
Edensville	Camrose County		Yes
Edgemont Ridge	Parkland County		Yes
Edgewood Acres	Parkland County		Yes
Edinburgh Park	Parkland County		Yes
Edison	Westlock		Yes
Edouardville	County of St. Paul No. 19		Yes
Egg Lake	Regional Municipality of Wood Buffalo		Yes
Eidswold	Donalda		Yes
El Greco Estates	Beaver County		Yes
Eladesor	Drumheller		Yes
Elbow River Estates	Rocky View County		Yes
Elbridge	Thorhild County	Yes	Yes
Elcan	Municipal District of Taber		Yes
Eldoe's Trailer Court	County of Grande Prairie No. 1		Yes
Eldoes Trailer Park	County of Grande Prairie No. 1		Yes
Eldon	Improvement District No. 9	Yes	Yes
Eldorena	Thorhild County	Yes	Yes
Eleske	Child Lake 164A	Yes	
Elinor Lake Subdivision	Lac La Biche County		Yes
Elizabeth	Municipal District of Bonnyville No. 87		Yes
Elizabeth Metis Settlement	Municipal District of Bonnyville No. 87		Yes
Elk Island	Strathcona County	Yes	Yes
Elk Island National Park	Improvement District No. 13		Yes
Elk Valley Park	Rocky View County		Yes
Elkland Estates	Strathcona County		Yes
Elkton	Mountain View County	Yes	Yes
Elkwater	Cypress County	Yes	Yes
Ellerslie	Edmonton		Yes
Elmjay Industrial Park	Edmonton		Yes
Elmspring	County of Warner No. 5		Yes
Elspeth	Red Deer County	Yes	Yes
Eltham	Foothills County	Yes	Yes
Embarras	Regional Municipality of Wood Buffalo	Yes	Yes
Embarras	Yellowhead County	Yes	Yes
Embarras Portage	Regional Municipality of Wood Buffalo	Yes	Yes
Endon	County of Forty Mile No. 8		Yes
Enoch	Enoch Cree Nation 135	Yes	
Ensleigh	Special Area No. 4	Yes	Yes
Entheos West	Rocky View County		Yes
Entice	Kneehill County	Yes	Yes
Entrance	Yellowhead County		Yes
Equity	Kneehill County	Yes	Yes
Erin Estates	Parkland County		Yes
Erin Lodge	Municipal District of Fairview No. 136	Yes	Yes
Erith	Yellowhead County	Yes	Yes
Erith Tie	Yellowhead County		Yes
Ervick	Camrose County	Yes	Yes
Esther	Special Area No. 3	Yes	Yes
Ethel Lake	Municipal District of Bonnyville No. 87	Yes	Yes
Eunice	Westlock County		Yes
Eureka Beach	Parkland County		Yes
Eureka River	Clear Hills County	Yes	Yes
Evarts	Red Deer County	Yes	Yes
Evergreen	Clearwater County	Yes	Yes
Evergreen Trailer Park	Edmonton		Yes
Excel	Special Area No. 3	Yes	Yes
Excelsior	Sturgeon County	Yes	Yes
Executive Estates	Strathcona County		Yes
Exelsior Park	Parkland County		Yes
Eyremore	Vulcan County		Yes
Fairacres	County of Northern Lights		Yes
Fairhaven East Subdivision	Sturgeon County		Yes
Fairhaven West Subdivision	Sturgeon County		Yes
Fairview Heights	County of Wetaskiwin No. 10		Yes
Fairway Meadows	Brazeau County		Yes
Fairydell	Sturgeon County		Yes
Faith	County of Forty Mile No. 8		Yes
Falcon Hills	Parkland County		Yes
Farrant	Lacombe County	Yes	Yes
Farrell Estates	Strathcona County		Yes
Farrell Properties	Strathcona County		Yes
Farrow	Vulcan County	Yes	Yes
Fawn Lake	Westlock County	Yes	Yes
Fawnhill	Rocky View County		Yes
Federal	County of Paintearth No. 18	Yes	Yes
Fedorah	Sturgeon County	Yes	Yes
Fenn	County of Stettler No. 6	Yes	Yes
Ferguson Flats	County of St. Paul No. 19		Yes
Ferlow Junction	Camrose County		Yes
Fern Creek	Leduc County		Yes
Fern Valley Trailer Park	Lac Ste. Anne County		Yes
Fernwood Estates	Parkland County		Yes
Ferrier	Clearwater County	Yes	Yes
Ferrier Acres Trailer Court	Clearwater County		Yes
Fidler	Yellowhead County		Yes
Fieldholme	Special Area No. 2	Yes	Yes
Fifth Meridian	Mackenzie County	Yes	Yes
Fincastle	Municipal District of Taber	Yes	Yes
Finnegan	Special Area No. 2	Yes	Yes
Fisher Home	Leduc County	Yes	Yes
Fishing Lake Metis Settlement	Municipal District of Bonnyville No. 87		Yes
Fitzallen	County of Minburn No. 27	Yes	Yes
Fitzgerald	Cypress County		Yes
Fitzgerald	Regional Municipality of Wood Buffalo	Yes	
Fitzgerald	Thebathi 196		Yes
Fitzgerald 196	Regional Municipality of Wood Buffalo		Yes
Fitzgerald Settlement	Regional Municipality of Wood Buffalo		Yes
Fitzsimmons	County of Grande Prairie No. 1		Yes
Flat Lake	Municipal District of Bonnyville No. 87	Yes	Yes
Fleming	Red Deer County		Yes
Fleming Park	Parkland County		Yes
Floating Stone	County of St. Paul No. 19		Yes
Florann	County of Forty Mile No. 8		Yes
Flying Shot	County of Grande Prairie No. 1		Yes
Flyingshot Lake Settlement	County of Grande Prairie No. 1		Yes
Foisy	County of St. Paul No. 19	Yes	Yes
Fontaine Development	Municipal District of Bonnyville No. 87		Yes
Foothills	Yellowhead County	Yes	Yes
Footner Lake	Mackenzie County	Yes	Yes
Forest Glenn	Beaver County		Yes
Forest Heights	Parkland County		Yes
Forest Hills Country Estates	Strathcona County		Yes
Forest Lawn	Calgary		Yes
Forest View	Municipal District of Smoky River No. 130		Yes
Forest West	Lac Ste. Anne County		Yes
Fork Lake	Lac La Biche County	Yes	Yes
Forshee	Lacombe County		Yes
Fort Augustus	Sturgeon County		Yes
Fort Mckay	Fort Mackay		Yes
Fort Saskatchewan Settlement	Sturgeon County		Yes
Fort Smith Settlement	Regional Municipality of Wood Buffalo		Yes
Fort Vermilion Settlement	Mackenzie County		Yes
Forth	Red Deer		Yes
Fourth Creek	Saddle Hills County	Yes	
Fox	Cypress County		Yes
Fox Lake	Fox Lake 162	Yes	Yes
Frains	Athabasca County	Yes	Yes
Franchere	Municipal District of Bonnyville No. 87	Yes	Yes
Frank	Crowsnest Pass	Yes	Yes
Frank Subdivision	Ponoka County		Yes
Fraspur	County of Wetaskiwin No. 10	Yes	Yes
Freedom	County of Barrhead No. 11	Yes	Yes
Freeman	Parkland County		Yes
Freeman River	Woodlands County	Yes	Yes
Freemore Estates	Sturgeon County		Yes
French Creek	Westlock County		Yes
Fresnoy	Municipal District of Bonnyville No. 87	Yes	Yes
Friedenstal	Municipal District of Fairview No. 136	Yes	Yes
Frog Lake	County of St. Paul No. 19	Yes	Yes
Fulham Park	Strathcona County		Yes
Furman	Municipal District of Willow Creek No. 26		Yes
Gaetz Valley	Delburne		Yes
Gage	Municipal District of Fairview No. 136	Yes	Yes
Gahern	County of Forty Mile No. 8		Yes
Galarneauville	Special Area No. 2	Yes	Yes
Galloway	Yellowhead County	Yes	Yes
Galloway Park Subdivision	Strathcona County		Yes
Ganske	County of Wetaskiwin No. 10		Yes
Gap	Municipal District of Bighorn No. 8	Yes	Yes
Garden Creek	Improvement District No. 24	Yes	Yes
Garden Estates	Strathcona County		Yes
Garden Grove Estates	Parkland County		Yes
Garden Heights	Rocky View County		Yes
Garden Heights	Strathcona County		Yes
Garden Plain	Special Area No. 2	Yes	Yes
Gardenview	County of Barrhead No. 11	Yes	Yes
Gardner's Cove	Parkland County		Yes
Garfield	Mountain View County	Yes	Yes
Garrington	Red Deer County	Yes	Yes
Garrington Acres	Red Deer County		Yes
Garth	Clearwater County	Yes	Yes
Gartly	Starland County	Yes	Yes
Gateway Estates	Leduc County		Yes
Gatine	Kneehill County	Yes	Yes
Gayford	Rocky View County	Yes	Yes
Geikie	Jasper		Yes
Genesee	Leduc County	Yes	Yes
Genesse Park	Parkland County		Yes
Georgian Estates	Rocky View County		Yes
Ghent	Lethbridge County		Yes
Ghost Dam	Rocky View County		Yes
Ghost Pine	Kneehill County		Yes
Ghost Pine Creek	Kneehill County	Yes	Yes
Gibbons Lea	Sturgeon County		Yes
Gibbons Station	Sturgeon County		Yes
Gift Lake	Gift Lake Metis Settlement	Yes	Yes
Gift Lake Metis Settlement	Big Lakes County		Yes
Gilby	Lacombe County	Yes	Yes
Gilt Edge	Municipal District of Wainwright No. 61	Yes	Yes
Gilwood	Big Lakes County	Yes	Yes
Gladys	Foothills County	Yes	Yes
Glamorgan	Calgary		Yes
Glen Haven	County of St. Paul No. 19		Yes
Glen Leslie	County of Grande Prairie No. 1	Yes	Yes
Glen On The Lake	County of St. Paul No. 19		Yes
Glen Park	Leduc County	Yes	Yes
Glenbow	Rocky View County	Yes	Yes
Glenbrook	Calgary		Yes
Glenford	Lac Ste. Anne County	Yes	Yes
Glengarry	Calgary		Yes
Gleniffer	Red Deer County		Yes
Glenister	Lac Ste. Anne County	Yes	Yes
Glenshaw	Athabasca County		Yes
Glenview	Sturgeon County		Yes
Glenwood Estates	Parkland County		Yes
Glenwood Park Estates	Strathcona County		Yes
Glenwoodville	Cardston County		Yes
Glory Hills Development	Sturgeon County		Yes
Glory Hills Estates	Parkland County		Yes
Goddard	County of Forty Mile No. 8		Yes
Gold Spur	Special Area No. 3		Yes
Golden Acres	Parkland County		Yes
Golden Glen Estates	Lac Ste. Anne County		Yes
Golden Heights	Sturgeon County		Yes
Golden Spike	Parkland County	Yes	Yes
Goldeye	Clearwater County		Yes
Good Hope	Strathcona County		Yes
Goodfish Lake	Whitefish Lake 128	Yes	Yes
Goodridge	Municipal District of Bonnyville No. 87	Yes	Yes
Goodwin	Municipal District of Greenview No. 16	Yes	Yes
Gopher Head	County of Stettler No. 6		Yes
Gordondale	Saddle Hills County	Yes	Yes
Goudreau	Leduc County		Yes
Gourin	Regional Municipality of Wood Buffalo		Yes
Graham Heights	Strathcona County		Yes
Grainger	Kneehill County	Yes	Yes
Graminia	Parkland County		Yes
Granada	Yellowhead County	Yes	Yes
Grand Centre	Cold Lake		Yes
Grand River Valley	Parkland County		Yes
Grande Cache Lake	Municipal District of Greenview No. 16		Yes
Grandin	Regional Municipality of Wood Buffalo		Yes
Grandmuir Estates	Parkland County		Yes
Grandview Estates	County of Vermilion River		Yes
Grandview Heights	County of Wetaskiwin No. 10		Yes
Grandview Heights	Sturgeon County		Yes
Granlea	County of Forty Mile No. 8		Yes
Granta	County of Newell		Yes
Grantham	Municipal District of Taber	Yes	Yes
Gratz	County of St. Paul No. 19		Yes
Grave Flats	Yellowhead County		Yes
Gray Drive Estates	Strathcona County		Yes
Gray Subdivision	Clearwater County		Yes
Green Acres	Leduc County		Yes
Green Acres Estates	Parkland County		Yes
Green Glade	Municipal District of Provost No. 52	Yes	Yes
Green Ridge Park	Red Deer County		Yes
Green Valley Place	Rocky View County		Yes
Greenacres Estates	Sturgeon County		Yes
Greenbrae	Strathcona County		Yes
Greendale Subdivision	County of Barrhead No. 11		Yes
Greenfield Acres	Parkland County		Yes
Greenhaven	Strathcona County		Yes
Greenhaven Estates	Strathcona County		Yes
Greenlawn	County of Vermilion River		Yes
Greenwood Estates	Strathcona County		Yes
Gregg Subdivision	Yellowhead County		Yes
Grey	Municipal District of Greenview No. 16		Yes
Grierson	Wheatland County		Yes
Griesbach	Strathcona County	Yes	Yes
Grieseach	Wheatland County		Yes
Griffin Creek	Municipal District of Peace No. 135	Yes	Yes
Grizzly	Municipal District of Greenview No. 16		Yes
Grosmont	Athabasca County	Yes	Yes
Grosvenor Park	Edmonton		Yes
Groton	County of Forty Mile No. 8		Yes
Grouard Mission	Big Lakes County	Yes	Yes
Grouse Meadows	Camrose County		Yes
Grove Acres	Parkland County		Yes
Gundy	Saddle Hills County	Yes	Yes
Gunnmanor	Strathcona County		Yes
Gurneyville	Municipal District of Bonnyville No. 87	Yes	Yes
Habay	Hay Lake 209	Yes	Yes
Hacienda Estates	Parkland County		Yes
Hacke	Cardston County		Yes
Hackett	County of Stettler No. 6	Yes	Yes
Haddock	Yellowhead County	Yes	Yes
Haight	Beaver County	Yes	Yes
Halach	Westlock County	Yes	Yes
Halcourt	County of Grande Prairie No. 1	Yes	Yes
Halcreek	Westlock County	Yes	Yes
Half Moon Bay	Red Deer County		Yes
Half Moon Estates	Strathcona County		Yes
Halfway Lake	Westlock County	Yes	Yes
Halliday	Special Area No. 2		Yes
Halsbury	Special Area No. 2		Yes
Hamilton Lake	County of Paintearth No. 18		Yes
Hamlet	Wheatland County	Yes	Yes
Hamlin	Smoky Lake County	Yes	Yes
Hanlon	Yellowhead County		Yes
Hansen Subdivision	Sturgeon County		Yes
Hansen-Mayer	Lac Ste. Anne County		Yes
Hanson Estates	Strathcona County		Yes
Hanson Subdivision	Sturgeon County		Yes
Hansonville	Yellowhead County		Yes
Hants	County of Newell		Yes
Happy Acres	Parkland County		Yes
Happy Hollow	Municipal District of Bonnyville No. 87	Yes	Yes
Happy Valley	Saddle Hills County	Yes	
Harder Acres	Parkland County		Yes
Hardieville	Lethbridge		Yes
Hargwen	Yellowhead County		Yes
Harlech	Clearwater County	Yes	Yes
Harmattan	Mountain View County	Yes	Yes
Harmon Valley	Northern Sunrise County	Yes	Yes
Harris Acres	Parkland County		Yes
Harrison	Red Deer County		Yes
Hartell	Foothills County	Yes	Yes
Hartleyville	Cardston County	Yes	Yes
Hartshorn	County of Stettler No. 6	Yes	Yes
Hattonford	Yellowhead County	Yes	Yes
Haven	Municipal District of Acadia No. 34		Yes
Hawick	Wheatland County		Yes
Hawk Hills	County of Northern Lights	Yes	Yes
Hawkins	Municipal District of Wainwright No. 61		Yes
Hay Camp	Improvement District No. 24	Yes	Yes
Hayfield	County of Grande Prairie No. 1	Yes	Yes
Haysboro	Calgary		Yes
Hazel Grove	Leduc County		Yes
Hazeldine	County of Vermilion River	Yes	Yes
Hazell	Crowsnest Pass	Yes	Yes
Hazelmere	County of Grande Prairie No. 1	Yes	Yes
Heart Lake	County of Stettler No. 6	Yes	Yes
Heart River	Big Lakes County	Yes	Yes
Heart River Settlement	Big Lakes County		Yes
Heart Valley	Birch Hills County		Yes
Heatburg	Lacombe County	Yes	Yes
Heath	Municipal District of Wainwright No. 61	Yes	Yes
Heatherdown	Lac Ste. Anne County	Yes	Yes
Heatherlea	Parkland County		Yes
Heldar	Lac Ste. Anne County	Yes	Yes
Helenslea Estates	Parkland County		Yes
Helina	Lac La Biche County	Yes	Yes
Helmer	Kneehill County		Yes
Helmsdale	Airdrie		Yes
Helmsdale	Rocky View County	Yes	
Helmsdale	Special Area No. 3	Yes	Yes
Hemaruka	Special Area No. 4	Yes	Yes
Henday	Red Deer County	Yes	Yes
Hennic Acres	Parkland County		Yes
Henry House	Jasper	Yes	Yes
Hercules	Strathcona County		Yes
Herder	Red Deer County		Yes
Heritage Hills	Strathcona County		Yes
Heritage Woods Subdivision	Calgary		Yes
Hermit Lake	County of Grande Prairie No. 1		Yes
Hespero	Lacombe County	Yes	Yes
Hewitt Estates	Sturgeon County		Yes
High Point Estates	Rocky View County		Yes
High Ridge Place	Strathcona County		Yes
High Ridge Properties	Red Deer County		Yes
Highland Acres	Parkland County		Yes
Highland Park	Municipal District of Fairview No. 136	Yes	Yes
Highland Park Subdivision	Lac Ste. Anne County		Yes
Highland Ranch	Kneehill County	Yes	Yes
Highridge	County of Barrhead No. 11	Yes	Yes
Highroad Estates	Strathcona County		Yes
Highvale	Parkland County	Yes	Yes
Highway	Woodlands County	Yes	Yes
Hillcrest	Crowsnest Pass		Yes
Hillcrest Mines	Crowsnest Pass	Yes	Yes
Hillhurst	Calgary		Yes
Hillsborough Estates	Sturgeon County		Yes
Hillsdale	Strathcona County		Yes
Hillsdown	Red Deer County	Yes	Yes
Hillside Estates	County of St. Paul No. 19		Yes
Hillside Estates	Parkland County		Yes
Hillside Park	Strathcona County		Yes
Hilltop	Municipal District of Greenview No. 16		Yes
Hilltop Acres	Parkland County		Yes
Hilltop Estates	County of Grande Prairie No. 1		Yes
Hilltop Estates	Leduc County		Yes
Hillview Estates	Lac Ste. Anne County		Yes
Hillview Estates	Parkland County		Yes
Hindville	County of Vermilion River		Yes
Hinton Trail	County of Grande Prairie No. 1	Yes	Yes
Hockey Estates	County of Grande Prairie No. 1		Yes
Hoff	Yellowhead County		Yes
Hoffman Beach	Lac Ste. Anne County		Yes
Holborn	Parkland County	Yes	Yes
Holland Subdivision	Strathcona County		Yes
Hollow Lake	Thorhild County	Yes	Yes
Holloway	Yellowhead County		Yes
Holmes Crossing	County of Barrhead No. 11	Yes	Yes
Holyoke	Municipal District of Bonnyville No. 87	Yes	Yes
Home Acres	Lac Ste. Anne County		Yes
Homeglen	Ponoka County		Yes
Homestead	County of Grande Prairie No. 1	Yes	Yes
Hondo	Municipal District of Lesser Slave River No. 124	Yes	Yes
Hope Valley	Municipal District of Wainwright No. 61		Yes
Horburg	Clearwater County		Yes
Horen	Parkland County	Yes	Yes
Horizon West	Parkland County		Yes
Hornbeck	Yellowhead County	Yes	Yes
Horne Beach	Lac Ste. Anne County		Yes
Horse Hill	Edmonton		Yes
Horse Lake	Horse Lakes 152B	Yes	
Horseshoe Lake	Red Deer County	Yes	Yes
Horton Place	Strathcona County		Yes
Hoselaw	Municipal District of Bonnyville No. 87	Yes	Yes
Hotchkiss	County of Northern Lights	Yes	Yes
Howie	Special Area No. 2		Yes
Hu Haven	Sturgeon County		Yes
Hubalta	Calgary		Yes
Hubble Lake Subdivision	Parkland County		Yes
Huggett	Leduc County	Yes	Yes
Hulbert Crescent	Strathcona County	Yes	Yes
Hunka	Lamont County	Yes	
Hunter Heights	Strathcona County		Yes
Hunter Hill Estates	Strathcona County		Yes
Huntington Heights	Parkland County		Yes
Hurdy	Woodlands County		Yes
Hurstwood	Edmonton		Yes
Hutch Lake	Mackenzie County	Yes	Yes
Hutton	Special Area No. 2		Yes
Hycrest Place	Parkland County		Yes
Hyland Hills	Strathcona County		Yes
Idamay	Special Area No. 4	Yes	Yes
Idle Hours	County of Barrhead No. 11		Yes
Idlewood Estates	Rocky View County		Yes
Illingworth	Cypress County		Yes
Imperial Mills	Lac La Biche County	Yes	Yes
Improvement District No. 1	Cypress County		Yes
Improvement District No. 10	Clearwater County		Yes
Improvement District No. 17	Big Lakes County		Yes
Improvement District No. 18 (Part)	Municipal District of Bonnyville No. 87		Yes
Improvement District No. 40	Municipal District of Pincher Creek No. 9		Yes
Improvement District No. 6	Municipal District of Ranchland No. 66		Yes
Improvement District No. 8	Municipal District of Bighorn No. 8		Yes
Improvement District No. 143	Regional Municipality of Wood Buffalo		Yes
Indian Cabins	Mackenzie County	Yes	Yes
Indian Lake Meadows	County of Vermilion River		Yes
Inglewood	Calgary		Yes
Inland	County of Minburn No. 27	Yes	Yes
Inverlake	Rocky View County	Yes	Yes
Inversnay	County of Forty Mile No. 8		Yes
Ireland Subdivision	Strathcona County		Yes
Ireton	Leduc County	Yes	Yes
Iron River	Municipal District of Bonnyville No. 87		Yes
Islet Lake Estates	Beaver County		Yes
Ispas	County of Two Hills No. 21	Yes	Yes
Ithacan Drive	Strathcona County		Yes
J D Barr Subdivision	County of Grande Prairie No. 1		Yes
J. C.'s Ranch	Parkland County		Yes
J.D. Renton Subdivision	County of Grande Prairie No. 1		Yes
J.D. Willis Subdivision	County of Grande Prairie No. 1		Yes
Jackfish	Chipewyan 201	Yes	Yes
Jackfish River	Improvement District No. 24	Yes	Yes
Jackson	Lacombe County		Yes
Jackville	Mountain View County	Yes	Yes
Jalna	Lac Ste. Anne County	Yes	Yes
James River Bridge	Clearwater County	Yes	Yes
Janvier	Janvier 194	Yes	
Jarrow	Municipal District of Wainwright No. 61		Yes
Jasper	Jasper	Yes	
Jasper Lodge	Jasper		Yes
Jasper National Park	Jasper		Yes
Jasper Park Lodge	Jasper		Yes
Jasper Place	Edmonton		Yes
Jay Haven	Parkland County		Yes
Jaydot	Cypress County		Yes
Jefferson	Cardston County		Yes
Jeffrey	Westlock County	Yes	Yes
Jensen	County of Forty Mile No. 8	Yes	Yes
Jesperview Heights	Parkland County		Yes
Jidaro Valley Subdivision	Strathcona County		Yes
John D'or Prairie	John D'Or Prairie 215	Yes	Yes
Johnny's Estates	Parkland County		Yes
Johnny's Lake Estates	Parkland County		Yes
Johnston Park	Lac Ste. Anne County		Yes
Jones Beach	Lac Ste. Anne County		Yes
Joyland and Jade Estates	Beaver County		Yes
Judah	Northern Sunrise County	Yes	Yes
Judson	County of Warner No. 5	Yes	Yes
Jumping Pound (Forest Res)	Municipal District of Bighorn No. 8		Yes
June	Lacombe County		Yes
Juniper Hill	Sturgeon County		Yes
Juno	County of Forty Mile No. 8	Yes	Yes
Kahwin	Lamont County	Yes	Yes
Kaleland	County of Two Hills No. 21	Yes	Yes
Kananaskis	Municipal District of Bighorn No. 8	Yes	Yes
Kananaskis Village	Kananaskis Improvement District	Yes	Yes
Kasha	Lacombe County	Yes	Yes
Kathleen	Municipal District of Smoky River No. 130	Yes	Yes
Kathmarcan Estates	Parkland County		Yes
Kaybob	Municipal District of Greenview No. 16		Yes
Kayda Vista	Leduc County		Yes
Kaydee	Yellowhead County		Yes
Keding Estates	Strathcona County		Yes
Keg River	County of Northern Lights	Yes	Yes
Kehewin	Kehewin 123	Yes	
Kehewin Cree Nation	Kehewin 123		Yes
Keith	Calgary		Yes
Kemp River	County of Northern Lights	Yes	Yes
Kenny Woods	Regional Municipality of Wood Buffalo	Yes	Yes
Kenzie	Big Lakes County		Yes
Kerensky	Thorhild County	Yes	Yes
Kersey	Rocky View County	Yes	Yes
Kessler	Municipal District of Provost No. 52		Yes
Kevisville	Red Deer County	Yes	Yes
Kew	Foothills County	Yes	Yes
Keystone	Leduc County		Yes
Kikino	Kikino Metis Settlement	Yes	Yes
Kikino Metis Settlement	Smoky Lake County		Yes
Kilini Ridge	Parkland County		Yes
Killarney	Calgary		Yes
Killarney Lake	Municipal District of Wainwright No. 61	Yes	Yes
Kilsyth	Westlock County	Yes	Yes
Kinbrook	County of Newell		Yes
Kingsland	Calgary		Yes
Kingsway Estates	Beaver County		Yes
Kinikinik	Athabasca County	Yes	Yes
Kininvie	County of Newell		Yes
Kinosis	Regional Municipality of Wood Buffalo	Yes	Yes
Kipp	Lethbridge County	Yes	Yes
Kirkpatrick	Kneehill County	Yes	Yes
Kiron	Camrose County	Yes	Yes
Kitsim	County of Newell		Yes
Kleskun Hill	County of Grande Prairie No. 1		Yes
Knappen	County of Warner No. 5		Yes
Knee Hill Valley	Red Deer County	Yes	Yes
Kneehill	Drumheller		Yes
Knight	Woodlands County		Yes
Knob Hill	County of Wetaskiwin No. 10	Yes	Yes
Koknee	County of Vermilion River		Yes
Kolba Estates	Parkland County		Yes
Kolga Estates	Parkland County		Yes
Kootuk	Lacombe County		Yes
Kounty Meadows Estates	Red Deer County		Yes
Kovach	Kananaskis Improvement District		Yes
Krakow	Lamont County	Yes	Yes
Ksituan	Saddle Hills County	Yes	Yes
Kuusamo	Red Deer County		Yes
Kuusamo Krest	Lacombe County		Yes
Labuma	Red Deer		Yes
Lac Bellevue	County of St. Paul No. 19	Yes	Yes
Lac Canard	County of St. Paul No. 19		Yes
Lac La Biche Mission	Lac La Biche County	Yes	Yes
Lac la Nonne	Lac Ste. Anne County	Yes	Yes
Lac Magloire	Municipal District of Smoky River No. 130		Yes
Lac Ste. Anne	Lac Ste. Anne County	Yes	Yes
Lac Ste. Anne Settlement	Lac Ste. Anne County		Yes
Lahaieville	Athabasca County		Yes
Lake Country Estates	Parkland County		Yes
Lake Crest	Parkland County		Yes
Lake Edith	Improvement District No. 12		Yes
Lake Eliza	County of St. Paul No. 19	Yes	Yes
Lake Erie Estates	Rocky View County		Yes
Lake Geneva	County of Minburn No. 27		Yes
Lake Isle	Lac Ste. Anne County	Yes	Yes
Lake Isle Estates	Parkland County		Yes
Lake Louise	Improvement District No. 9	Yes	Yes
Lake Majeau	Lac Ste. Anne County	Yes	Yes
Lake Saskatoon	County of Grande Prairie No. 1	Yes	Yes
Lakedell	County of Wetaskiwin No. 10	Yes	Yes
Lakeland Estates	County of Wetaskiwin No. 10		Yes
Lakeland Village	Strathcona County		Yes
Lakeland Village Trailer Park	Strathcona County		Yes
Lakesend	County of Paintearth No. 18	Yes	Yes
Lakeside Country Estates	County of Wetaskiwin No. 10		Yes
Lakeside Park	Parkland County		Yes
Lakeview	Strathcona County		Yes
Lakeview Estates	County of Grande Prairie No. 1		Yes
Lakeview Estates	Lac La Biche County	Yes	Yes
Lakeview Estates	Strathcona County		Yes
Lakewood Acres	Strathcona County		Yes
Lakewood Estates	Lac Ste. Anne County		Yes
Lambton Park	Edmonton		Yes
Lamerton	Lacombe County		Yes
Lamoral	Cypress County		Yes
Lamorr Landing Estates	Parkland County		Yes
Lancaster Park	Sturgeon County	Yes	Yes
Landmark Estates	Parkland County		Yes
Landonville	County of Vermilion River		Yes
Lanfine	Special Area No. 3		Yes
Langford Park	Parkland County	Yes	Yes
Lansdowne Estates	Rocky View County		Yes
Lansdowne Park	County of Wetaskiwin No. 10		Yes
Larch Tree Park	County of Wetaskiwin No. 10		Yes
Larmour	Cypress County		Yes
Las Villas	Strathcona County		Yes
Last Lake	Municipal District of Peace No. 135		Yes
Lathom	County of Newell	Yes	Yes
Latornell	Municipal District of Greenview No. 16		Yes
Laurentian Heights	Lac Ste. Anne County		Yes
Laurina Estates	Strathcona County		Yes
Lavesta	Ponoka County	Yes	Yes
Lawsonburg	Special Area No. 2		Yes
Lawton	County of Barrhead No. 11	Yes	Yes
Le Goff	Regional Municipality of Wood Buffalo		Yes
Lea Park	County of Vermilion River	Yes	Yes
Leahurst	County of Stettler No. 6	Yes	Yes
Leaman	Yellowhead County	Yes	Yes
Leddy	County of Northern Lights		Yes
Leduc Lynnwood Ranch	Foothills County		Yes
Leeshore	Lamont County	Yes	Yes
Legend	County of Forty Mile No. 8	Yes	Yes
Lehigh	Drumheller	Yes	Yes
Leicester	Big Lakes County	Yes	Yes
Leighmore	County of Grande Prairie No. 1	Yes	Yes
Leismer	Regional Municipality of Wood Buffalo	Yes	Yes
Leisure Lake	Foothills County		Yes
Lenarthur	Regional Municipality of Wood Buffalo	Yes	Yes
Lenzie	Lethbridge County		Yes
Leo	County of Stettler No. 6	Yes	Yes
Les Trailer Park	Red Deer County		Yes
Lessard	Municipal District of Bonnyville No. 87	Yes	Yes
Lesser Slave Lake Settlement	Big Lakes County		Yes
Levder's Ridge Subdivision	Strathcona County		Yes
Leyland	Yellowhead County		Yes
L'Hirondelle	Northern Sunrise County		Yes
Lightning Bay	County of Barrhead No. 11		Yes
Lily Lake Estates	Sturgeon County		Yes
Lina Country Estates	Strathcona County		Yes
Linaria	Westlock County	Yes	Yes
Lincoln	Athabasca County	Yes	Yes
Lincoln Green	Strathcona County		Yes
Lincoln Park	Calgary		Yes
Lincolnshire Downs	Parkland County		Yes
Linda Vista	Leduc County		Yes
Lindale	Brazeau County	Yes	Yes
Lindale	Strathcona County	Yes	
Lindale Park	Strathcona County		Yes
Lindberg	Strathcona County		Yes
Lindbrook	Beaver County	Yes	Yes
Lindbrook Estates	Beaver County		Yes
Linden Acres	Parkland County		Yes
Linkewich Trailer Court	County of St. Paul No. 19		Yes
Lisburn	Lac Ste. Anne County	Yes	Yes
Little Fishery	Improvement District No. 24	Yes	Yes
Little Gem	Special Area No. 4	Yes	Yes
Little Plume	Cypress County		Yes
Little Red River	Mackenzie County	Yes	Yes
Little Smoky	Municipal District of Smoky River No. 130		Yes
Little Smoky River	Municipal District of Greenview No. 16		Yes
Livingstone Estates	Rocky View County		Yes
Lloyds Hill	Special Area No. 4	Yes	Yes
Lobstick	Yellowhead County	Yes	Yes
Lobstick Settlement	Smoky Lake County		Yes
Lochearn	Clearwater County	Yes	Yes
Lochinvar	Lacombe County	Yes	Yes
Lockhart	Lacombe County	Yes	Yes
Lodge	Rocky Mountain House		Yes
Lombell	Woodlands County	Yes	Yes
Lone Pine	Woodlands County	Yes	Yes
Lonebutte	Special Area No. 2	Yes	Yes
Lonira	Woodlands County	Yes	Yes
Looma Estates	Leduc County		Yes
Loon Lake	Loon Lake 235	Yes	Yes
Lori Estates	Beaver County		Yes
Lorne Crossing	Special Area No. 2	Yes	
Lorraine	County of Paintearth No. 18	Yes	Yes
Lothrop	Municipal District of Fairview No. 136	Yes	Yes
Louden Park	Lac Ste. Anne County		Yes
Lovettville	Yellowhead County		Yes
Lower Manor Estates	Sturgeon County		Yes
Lower Therien Lake	County of St. Paul No. 19		Yes
Lower Viscount	Sturgeon County		Yes
Lower Viscount Estates	Sturgeon County		Yes
Loyalist	Special Area No. 4	Yes	Yes
Lubicon Lake	Northern Sunrise County		Yes
Lucky Strike	County of Warner No. 5		Yes
Lueder Ridge	Strathcona County		Yes
Lunnford	County of Barrhead No. 11	Yes	Yes
Lure	County of Paintearth No. 18	Yes	Yes
Luscar	Yellowhead County		Yes
Lutose	Mackenzie County	Yes	Yes
Luzan	Lamont County		Yes
Lyall Subdivision	Athabasca County		Yes
Lymburn	County of Grande Prairie No. 1	Yes	Yes
Lynburn	County of Grande Prairie No. 1		Yes
Lyndon	Municipal District of Willow Creek No. 26	Yes	Yes
Lynley Ridge	Strathcona County		Yes
Lynnwood	Calgary		Yes
Lynton	Regional Municipality of Wood Buffalo		Yes
MacArthur Siding	Sturgeon County		Yes
MacKay	Yellowhead County		Yes
Macson	Cypress County		Yes
Magnolia	Parkland County	Yes	Yes
Magnolia Bridge	Parkland County	Yes	Yes
Mahar Subdivision	County of Barrhead No. 11		Yes
Mahaska	Yellowhead County	Yes	Yes
Majestic	Special Area No. 2	Yes	Yes
Majorville	Vulcan County	Yes	Yes
Makepeace	Wheatland County	Yes	Yes
Maleb	County of Forty Mile No. 8	Yes	Yes
Mallard Park	Parkland County		Yes
Mallow	County of Newell	Yes	Yes
Malmo	County of Wetaskiwin No. 10	Yes	Yes
Maloy	Regional Municipality of Wood Buffalo		Yes
Manchester	Calgary		Yes
Manir	Municipal District of Spirit River No. 133	Yes	Yes
Manly	Lac Ste. Anne County	Yes	Yes
Manly Corner	Parkland County	Yes	Yes
Manor Estates	Sturgeon County		Yes
Mansfield Subdivision	County of Grande Prairie No. 1		Yes
Manuan Lake	Parkland County		Yes
Maple Grove	County of Grande Prairie No. 1		Yes
Maple Ridge	Sturgeon County		Yes
Maple Ridge Park	Edmonton		Yes
Mapova	Thorhild County	Yes	Yes
Margie	Lac La Biche County	Yes	Yes
Mariana Lake	Regional Municipality of Wood Buffalo	Yes	Yes
Marina	Clear Hills County		Yes
Marine Drive Estates	Parkland County		Yes
Mark Iv Estates	Strathcona County		Yes
Marler Subdivision	Strathcona County		Yes
Marquis Development	Leduc County		Yes
Marra Kesh Estates	Parkland County		Yes
Marten River	Woodland Cree 226	Yes	Yes
Martin River	Northern Sunrise County		Yes
Martin River Subdivision	Northern Sunrise County		Yes
Martins Trailer Court	Clearwater County		Yes
Marvin Gardens	Strathcona County		Yes
Masinasin	County of Warner No. 5		Yes
Massive	Improvement District No. 9	Yes	Yes
Matthews Crossing	Parkland County	Yes	Yes
Matzhiwin	County of Newell	Yes	Yes
Maude West	Parkland County		Yes
Maughan	County of Two Hills No. 21		Yes
Mayatan Lake Estates	Parkland County		Yes
Maybutt	County of Warner No. 5		Yes
Maycroft	Municipal District of Pincher Creek No. 9		Yes
Mayfair Heights	Parkland County		Yes
Mayfair Park	Lac Ste. Anne County		Yes
Mayton	Mountain View County	Yes	Yes
Maywood Bay	County of Wetaskiwin No. 10		Yes
Maywood Subdivision	County of Wetaskiwin No. 10		Yes
Mazeppa	Foothills County	Yes	Yes
McConnell Estates	Strathcona County		Yes
Mccree Acres	Camrose County		Yes
McDermott Subdivision	Lethbridge County		Yes
McDonaldville	County of Vermilion River		Yes
McKenzie Subdivision	Red Deer County		Yes
McLaurin Beach	Lacombe County		Yes
McLeod Beach	County of St. Paul No. 19		Yes
McLeod River	Yellowhead County	Yes	Yes
McLeod Valley	Yellowhead County	Yes	Yes
McMurray	Regional Municipality of Wood Buffalo		Yes
McNab	County of Warner No. 5	Yes	Yes
McNabb's	Athabasca County		Yes
McNeill	Cypress County	Yes	Yes
McRae	County of St. Paul No. 19	Yes	Yes
Meadow Court	Strathcona County		Yes
Meadow Crest	Parkland County		Yes
Meadow Grove Estates	Parkland County		Yes
Meadow Land Acres	Brazeau County		Yes
Meadow Land Estates	Strathcona County		Yes
Meadow Ridge	Parkland County		Yes
Meadow Run	Parkland County		Yes
Meadowbrook	Athabasca County	Yes	Yes
Meadowbrook Estates	Beaver County		Yes
Meadowbrook Heights	Strathcona County		Yes
Meadowview	County of Barrhead No. 11	Yes	Yes
Meadowview Park	Parkland County		Yes
Meander River	Upper Hay River 212	Yes	Yes
Meander River Station	Mackenzie County		Yes
Meanock	Athabasca County		Yes
Medicine Hat Junction	Special Area No. 2		Yes
Medicine Lake	Jasper		Yes
Medicine Lodge	Yellowhead County	Yes	Yes
Medley	Cold Lake		Yes
Mekastoe	Municipal District of Willow Creek No. 26		Yes
Meldal Subdivision	Camrose County		Yes
Mellowdale	County of Barrhead No. 11	Yes	Yes
Melody Meadows Trailer Park	Red Deer County		Yes
Menaik	Ponoka County	Yes	Yes
Mercoal	Yellowhead County	Yes	Yes
Meridian Estates	Parkland County		Yes
Messo West	Parkland County		Yes
Metis	Mackenzie County		Yes
Mewassin	Parkland County	Yes	Yes
Meyers Lakeshore Estates	Strathcona County		Yes
Miami	County of Warner No. 5	Yes	
Michael Park	Parkland County		Yes
Michel Park	Parkland County		Yes
Michigan Centre	Leduc County	Yes	Yes
Middle Creek	County of St. Paul No. 19	Yes	Yes
Midlandvale	Drumheller		Yes
Midnapore	Calgary		Yes
Midway Estates	Strathcona County		Yes
Miette	Improvement District No. 12	Yes	Yes
Miette Hot Springs	Jasper		Yes
Miette Hotsprings	Improvement District No. 12	Yes	Yes
Mildred Lake	Regional Municipality of Wood Buffalo	Yes	Yes
Mile West Trailer Park	Lac La Biche County		Yes
Military Point	Strathcona County		Yes
Millerfield	Special Area No. 2	Yes	Yes
Millham Gardens	Parkland County		Yes
Millicent	County of Newell	Yes	Yes
Milnerton	Red Deer County	Yes	Yes
Minaret	Mountain View County	Yes	Yes
Mini Vista	Leduc County		Yes
Miniskic Estates	Strathcona County		Yes
Mintlaw	Red Deer County	Yes	Yes
Miquelon Acres	Camrose County		Yes
Miquelon Estates	Beaver County		Yes
Mission Beach	Leduc County	Yes	Yes
Mission Creek Estates	Lac Ste. Anne County		Yes
Mitford	Rocky View County	Yes	Yes
Mitsue	Municipal District of Lesser Slave River No. 124	Yes	Yes
Model Development	Municipal District of Bonnyville No. 87		Yes
Modest Creek Estates	County of Wetaskiwin No. 10		Yes
Mon's Lake	Smoky Lake County		Yes
Mon's Lake Estates	Smoky Lake County		Yes
Mon's View Resort	Smoky Lake County		Yes
Montgomery	Calgary		Yes
Moon Lake	Parkland County	Yes	Yes
Mooncrest	Edmonton		Yes
Moonlight Bay Estates	County of Barrhead No. 11		Yes
Moose Lake Estates	Municipal District of Bonnyville No. 87		Yes
Moose Portage	Municipal District of Lesser Slave River No. 124	Yes	Yes
Moose Wallow	County of Barrhead No. 11	Yes	Yes
Morgan's Mountain Subdivision	County of Grande Prairie No. 1		Yes
Morley	Stoney 142, 143, 144	Yes	Yes
Morleyville Settlement	Stoney 142, 143, 144		Yes
Morning Meadows Subdivision	Ponoka County		Yes
Morningold Estates	County of Vermilion River		Yes
Morrish Subdivision	Clearwater County		Yes
Mosside	County of Barrhead No. 11	Yes	Yes
Mound	Mountain View County	Yes	Yes
Mount Kidd RV Park	Kananaskis Improvement District		Yes
Mount Royal	Calgary		Yes
Mount Valley	County of Grande Prairie No. 1	Yes	Yes
Mount View	Calgary		Yes
Mount View Estates	Rocky View County		Yes
Mountain House	Red Deer County		Yes
Mountain Park	Yellowhead County		Yes
Mountain View Estates	Rocky View County		Yes
Mountain View Estates	Yellowhead County		Yes
Mountain View Trailer Court	Cremona		Yes
Mountainside Acres	County of Grande Prairie No. 1		Yes
Mountainside Estates	County of Grande Prairie No. 1		Yes
Moyerton	County of Vermilion River		Yes
Muirhead	Municipal District of Willow Creek No. 26		Yes
Mullen Dalf	County of Wetaskiwin No. 10		Yes
Muriel	County of St. Paul No. 19	Yes	Yes
Muriel Lake	Municipal District of Bonnyville No. 87	Yes	Yes
Murray Acres Estates	Rocky View County		Yes
Muskeg River	Municipal District of Greenview No. 16	Yes	Yes
Mystery Lake	County of Barrhead No. 11	Yes	Yes
Nacmine	Drumheller	Yes	Yes
Naco	Special Area No. 3	Yes	Yes
Nakamun	Lac Ste. Anne County	Yes	Yes
Namao Ridge Estates	Sturgeon County		Yes
Naphtha	Foothills County	Yes	Yes
Naples	County of Barrhead No. 11	Yes	Yes
Naptha	Foothills County		Yes
Navarre	County of Wetaskiwin No. 10	Yes	Yes
Neapolis	Mountain View County	Yes	Yes
Nemiskam	County of Forty Mile No. 8	Yes	Yes
Netook	Mountain View County	Yes	Yes
Neutral Hills	Municipal District of Provost No. 52	Yes	Yes
Neutral Valley	Parkland County		Yes
Neutral Valley	Special Area No. 4	Yes	Yes
Nevis Junction	County of Stettler No. 6		Yes
New Fish Creek	Municipal District of Greenview No. 16	Yes	Yes
New Hill	Red Deer County		Yes
New Kiew	County of Minburn No. 27		Yes
New Lindsay	County of Vermilion River		Yes
New Lunnon	Sturgeon County		Yes
New Rockport	County of Warner No. 5	Yes	
New Saratoga Beach	Lacombe County		Yes
Newcastle Mine	Drumheller		Yes
Newton Estates	Strathcona County		Yes
Nicholson Subdivision	Municipal District of Bonnyville No. 87		Yes
Nier	Rocky View County	Yes	Yes
Night	Tsuut'ina 145	Yes	Yes
Nilrem	Municipal District of Provost No. 52	Yes	Yes
Ninastoko	Blood 148	Yes	Yes
Nine Mile Point	Big Lakes County		Yes
Niobe	County of Grande Prairie No. 1	Yes	Yes
Niobe	Red Deer County	Yes	Yes
Nisbet	Red Deer County	Yes	Yes
Niton	Yellowhead County		Yes
No Jack	Yellowhead County		Yes
Nojack	Yellowhead County	Yes	Yes
Nolan	Municipal District of Willow Creek No. 26		Yes
Noral	Lac La Biche County	Yes	Yes
Norbuck	County of Wetaskiwin No. 10	Yes	Yes
Nordhagen Subdivision	County of Grande Prairie No. 1		Yes
Nordic Place	County of Wetaskiwin No. 10		Yes
Norfolk	Rocky View County	Yes	Yes
Norma	County of Two Hills No. 21	Yes	Yes
Normandeau	Lac La Biche County	Yes	Yes
Normandville	Municipal District of Smoky River No. 130		Yes
Noroncal	Sturgeon County		Yes
Norris Acres	Parkland County		Yes
North Calling Lake	Municipal District of Opportunity No. 17		Yes
North Edmonton	Edmonton		Yes
North Fork	Municipal District of Pincher Creek No. 9	Yes	Yes
North Haven	Calgary		Yes
North Kotzman	Smoky Lake County		Yes
North Point	Sturgeon County		Yes
North Queensdale Place	Strathcona County		Yes
North Red Deer	Red Deer		Yes
North Side Acres	Parkland County		Yes
North Vermilion	Mackenzie County		Yes
North Vermilion Settlement	Mackenzie County		Yes
Northbank	Smoky Lake County	Yes	Yes
Northbrook	Thorhild County		Yes
Northcliffe	Blood 148		Yes
Northern Valley	County of St. Paul No. 19	Yes	Yes
Northleigh	Parkland County	Yes	Yes
Northmark	Saddle Hills County	Yes	Yes
Northridge Meadows	Parkland County		Yes
Northshore Heights	Municipal District of Bonnyville No. 87		Yes
Northville	Yellowhead County		Yes
Norway Valley	County of St. Paul No. 19		Yes
Noyes Crossing	Lac Ste. Anne County	Yes	Yes
Noyes Crossing Estates	Lac Ste. Anne County		Yes
Nugent	Ponoka County	Yes	Yes
Nywening	Sturgeon County		Yes
Oak Ridge Park	Edmonton		Yes
Oakwood Estates	Parkland County		Yes
Obed	Yellowhead County	Yes	Yes
Oberlin	County of Stettler No. 6	Yes	Yes
Ogden	Calgary		Yes
Oke	Yellowhead County	Yes	Yes
Old Entrance	Yellowhead County	Yes	Yes
Old Entwistle	Parkland County		Yes
Old Fort	Regional Municipality of Wood Buffalo	Yes	Yes
Old Town	Municipal District of Lesser Slave River No. 124		Yes
Oliver	Edmonton		Yes
Omaktai	Blood 148	Yes	Yes
O'Morrow	Athabasca County		Yes
Onefour	Cypress County	Yes	Yes
O'Neil Ranchettes	Rocky View County		Yes
Oras	Clearwater County		Yes
Ordze Park and Wye Road Garden	Strathcona County		Yes
Osborne Acres	Parkland County		Yes
Osthoff Estates	Sturgeon County		Yes
Otter	Tsuut'ina 145	Yes	Yes
Otway	Rocky Mountain House	Yes	Yes
Overlea	Municipal District of Lesser Slave River No. 124		Yes
Owen	Municipal District of Greenview No. 16		Yes
Owendale	Cardston County	Yes	Yes
Owl River	Lac La Biche County	Yes	Yes
Owlseye	County of St. Paul No. 19	Yes	Yes
Owlseye Lake	County of St. Paul No. 19		Yes
Oxville	County of Vermilion River	Yes	Yes
Ozada	Stoney 142, 143, 144	Yes	Yes
Paddle Prairie	Paddle Prairie Metis Settlement	Yes	Yes
Paddle Prairie Metis Settlement	County of Northern Lights		Yes
Padstow	Lac Ste. Anne County	Yes	Yes
Pageant	Vulcan County	Yes	Yes
Pakan	Smoky Lake County	Yes	Yes
Pakowki	County of Forty Mile No. 8	Yes	Yes
Panorama Acres	Leduc County		Yes
Panorama Heights	Parkland County		Yes
Paradise Estates	Lac Ste. Anne County		Yes
Paradise Resort	Camrose County		Yes
Paramac Cove	Parkland County		Yes
Paramac Point	Parkland County		Yes
Park Court	Yellowhead County	Yes	Yes
Park Farm	Municipal District of Wainwright No. 61	Yes	Yes
Park Glen Estates	Beaver County		Yes
Park La Nonne	County of Barrhead No. 11		Yes
Park Ridge Heights	Parkland County		Yes
Parkbend	Cardston County	Yes	Yes
Parkdale	Calgary		Yes
Parker Ridge	Strathcona County		Yes
Parkland Heights	Parkland County		Yes
Parkland Village Trailer Ct. North	Parkland County		Yes
Parkland Village Trailer Ct. South	Parkland County		Yes
Parklane Acres	Parkland County		Yes
Parklane Estates	Strathcona County		Yes
Parkside Estates	Strathcona County		Yes
Parkview Beach	Smoky Lake County		Yes
Parkview Estates	Parkland County		Yes
Parkview Ridge	Strathcona County		Yes
Parkwood Place	Strathcona County		Yes
Parmac Cove	Parkland County		Yes
Parmac Point	Parkland County		Yes
Partridge Heights	Parkland County		Yes
Partridge Hill	Strathcona County		Yes
Partridge Place	Parkland County		Yes
Partridge Place	Rocky View County		Yes
Parview Estates	Brazeau County		Yes
Pashley	Cypress County		Yes
Paso Valley Subdivision	Strathcona County		Yes
Pass Creek	Municipal District of Greenview No. 16		Yes
Paterson Park	Leduc County		Yes
Pathfinder	County of Two Hills No. 21	Yes	Yes
Patience	County of Wetaskiwin No. 10		Yes
Patricia Estates	Strathcona County		Yes
Patricia Hills	Parkland County		Yes
Paulson Pasture	Ponoka County		Yes
Paxson	Athabasca County	Yes	Yes
PBI	Lacombe County		Yes
Peace Grove	Clear Hills County		Yes
Peace Hills Heights	County of Wetaskiwin No. 10		Yes
Peace Hills Park	County of Wetaskiwin No. 10		Yes
Peace Point	Peace Point 222	Yes	Yes
Peace River Correctional Institution	Municipal District of Peace No. 135		Yes
Peacock	Vulcan County	Yes	Yes
Pearce	Municipal District of Willow Creek No. 26	Yes	Yes
Peavey	Sturgeon County	Yes	Yes
Peavine	Lac Ste. Anne County	Yes	Yes
Peavine Metis Settlement	Big Lakes County		Yes
Pebble Court	Strathcona County		Yes
Pecten	Municipal District of Pincher Creek No. 9		Yes
Pedley	Yellowhead County	Yes	Yes
Peerless Lake	Municipal District of Opportunity No. 17	Yes	Yes
Pekisko	Foothills County	Yes	Yes
Pelican Mountain	Municipal District of Opportunity No. 17		Yes
Pelican Portage	Municipal District of Opportunity No. 17	Yes	Yes
Pelican Settlement	Regional Municipality of Wood Buffalo		Yes
Pembina	Brazeau County	Yes	Yes
Pembina Forks	Yellowhead County		Yes
Pembina Heights	Westlock County	Yes	Yes
Pembridge	Lac Ste. Anne County	Yes	Yes
Pemburton Hill	Leduc County	Yes	Yes
Pemukan	Special Area No. 4	Yes	Yes
Pendant D'Oreille	County of Forty Mile No. 8		Yes
Pendant d'Oreille	County of Forty Mile No. 8		Yes
Pendryl	County of Wetaskiwin No. 10	Yes	Yes
Peno	Lamont County		Yes
Penridge Estates	Strathcona County		Yes
Perbeck	Kneehill County	Yes	Yes
Peter Burn Estate	Parkland County		Yes
Phidias	Wheatland County		Yes
Philips	Beaver County	Yes	Yes
Phillips	Beaver County		Yes
Philomena	Lac La Biche County		Yes
Pigeon Lake Haven	County of Wetaskiwin No. 10		Yes
Pigeon Mountain	Municipal District of Bighorn No. 8		Yes
Pilon Creek Estates	Sturgeon County		Yes
Pine Dale Subdivision	Yellowhead County		Yes
Pine Grove Acres	Strathcona County		Yes
Pine Grove Estates	Athabasca County		Yes
Pine Lake	Red Deer County	Yes	Yes
Pine Lane Trailer Court	Lac La Biche County		Yes
Pine Meadow	County of St. Paul No. 19		Yes
Pine Shadows	Yellowhead County		Yes
Pine Valley Acres Subdivision	Parkland County		Yes
Pine Valley Estates	County of Grande Prairie No. 1		Yes
Pine Valley Subdivision	County of Grande Prairie No. 1		Yes
Pinebrook	Thorhild County		Yes
Pinebrook Estates	Rocky View County		Yes
Pinedale	Yellowhead County		Yes
Pinedale Estates	Yellowhead County		Yes
Pineridge Downs	County of Wetaskiwin No. 10		Yes
Pineridge Estates	Foothills County		Yes
Pinewood Estates	Sturgeon County		Yes
Pinewood Subdivision	Parkland County		Yes
Pinewoods Estates	Clearwater County		Yes
Pingle	Regional Municipality of Wood Buffalo	Yes	Yes
Pinhorn	County of Forty Mile No. 8		Yes
Pioneer	Yellowhead County	Yes	Yes
Pipestone	County of Wetaskiwin No. 10	Yes	Yes
Pipestone Creek	County of Grande Prairie No. 1	Yes	Yes
Pirmez Creek	Rocky View County	Yes	Yes
Pitlochrie	Lac La Biche County	Yes	Yes
Pivot	Cypress County	Yes	Yes
Piyami	Lethbridge County		Yes
Plain Lake	County of Two Hills No. 21		Yes
Plateau Estates	County of St. Paul No. 19		Yes
Pleasant Hill Subdivision	Ponoka County		Yes
Pleasant View	Athabasca County	Yes	Yes
Pleasant View	Brazeau County		Yes
Pleasant View	Strathcona County		Yes
Pleasantview Acreages	Strathcona County		Yes
Pocahontas	Improvement District No. 12	Yes	Yes
Poe	Beaver County	Yes	Yes
Point Brule	Regional Municipality of Wood Buffalo	Yes	Yes
Pointe Aux Pins Estates	Strathcona County		Yes
Pointe de Roche	Improvement District No. 24	Yes	
Pollockville	Special Area No. 2	Yes	Yes
Poplar Grove	Parkland County		Yes
Poplar Hill	County of Grande Prairie No. 1	Yes	Yes
Poplar Lake Estates	Strathcona County		Yes
Poplar Ridge	Saddle Hills County		Yes
Poplar Ridge Subdivision	Red Deer County		Yes
Portas Gardens	Strathcona County		Yes
Prairie Echo	Big Lakes County	Yes	Yes
Prairie Lodge Trailer Court	County of Minburn No. 27		Yes
Prairie Royale	Rocky View County		Yes
Pratch Subdivision	County of St. Paul No. 19		Yes
Prentiss	Lacombe County	Yes	Yes
Prestige Heights	Parkland County		Yes
Prestone Village	County of Wetaskiwin No. 10		Yes
Prestville	Municipal District of Spirit River No. 133	Yes	Yes
Prevo	Red Deer County	Yes	Yes
Priddis Creek Estates	Foothills County		Yes
Primrose	County of St. Paul No. 19		Yes
Primula	County of St. Paul No. 19		Yes
Princes Island	Calgary		Yes
Princess	County of Newell	Yes	Yes
Princess Estates	Parkland County		Yes
Prospect Valley	Municipal District of Wainwright No. 61	Yes	Yes
Prosperity	Athabasca County	Yes	Yes
Puffer	County of Paintearth No. 18	Yes	Yes
Pulteney	Municipal District of Willow Creek No. 26	Yes	Yes
Quatre Fourches	Improvement District No. 24	Yes	Yes
Queensdale Place	Strathcona County	Yes	
Quesnel Country Estates	Strathcona County		Yes
Quigley	Regional Municipality of Wood Buffalo	Yes	Yes
Radnor	Rocky View County	Yes	Yes
Rainbow	Starland County		Yes
Raley	Cardston County	Yes	Yes
Ralston	Cypress County	Yes	Yes
Ranch	Municipal District of Lesser Slave River No. 124	Yes	Yes
Ranchville	County of Forty Mile No. 8		Yes
Rangeton	Yellowhead County	Yes	Yes
Rat Lake	Municipal District of Bonnyville No. 87		Yes
Raven	Red Deer County	Yes	Yes
Ravine	Yellowhead County	Yes	Yes
Raychuk Subdivision	County of Two Hills No. 21		Yes
Reco	Yellowhead County		Yes
Red Deer Junction	Red Deer County		Yes
Red Star	Municipal District of Fairview No. 136	Yes	Yes
Redelback	County of Newell		Yes
Redland	Wheatland County	Yes	Yes
Redwood Meadows	Tsuut'ina 145		Yes
Regal Park	Westlock County		Yes
Regency Estates	Sturgeon County		Yes
Regency Park Estates	Strathcona County		Yes
Renfrew	Calgary		Yes
Reno-Ville	Strathcona County		Yes
Repp Addition	County of Stettler No. 6		Yes
Repp Subdivision	County of Stettler No. 6		Yes
Research Station	County of Grande Prairie No. 1		Yes
Retlaw	Municipal District of Taber	Yes	Yes
Rex Block	Brazeau County		Yes
Reyda Vista Subdivision	Sturgeon County		Yes
Rich Lake	Lac La Biche County	Yes	Yes
Richdale Estates	Leduc County		Yes
Richfield Estates	Sturgeon County		Yes
Richie's Point	Parkland County		Yes
Richlyn Estates	Strathcona County		Yes
Richmond Hill Estates	County of Grande Prairie No. 1		Yes
Richmond Park	Athabasca County	Yes	Yes
Richmond Subdivision	County of Grande Prairie No. 1		Yes
Ricinus	Clearwater County	Yes	Yes
Rideau Park	Calgary		Yes
Ridgeclough	County of Vermilion River	Yes	Yes
Ridgewood Estates	Parkland County		Yes
Ridgewood Terrace	Red Deer County		Yes
Riel	County of St. Paul No. 19	Yes	
Rife	Municipal District of Bonnyville No. 87	Yes	Yes
Rimbey Ridge Estates	Ponoka County		Yes
Rio Frio	Foothills County		Yes
Rio Grande	County of Grande Prairie No. 1	Yes	Yes
River Ridge Estates	Rocky View County		Yes
River Ridge Subdivision	Brazeau County		Yes
Riverbend	Edmonton		Yes
Riverside Park	Sturgeon County		Yes
Riverview Acres	Parkland County		Yes
Riverview Park	Red Deer County		Yes
Riverview Pines Estates	County of Grande Prairie No. 1		Yes
Riverview Pines Subdivision	County of Grande Prairie No. 1		Yes
Riviere Qui Barre	Sturgeon County		Yes
Rizzie's Point	Parkland County		Yes
Robertson	Rocky View County		Yes
Robinson	Lac Ste. Anne County	Yes	Yes
Robinwood Acres	County of Vermilion River		Yes
Rocky Ford	Municipal District of Wainwright No. 61	Yes	Yes
Rocky Lane	Mackenzie County	Yes	Yes
Rocky Ridge Estates	Municipal District of Peace No. 135		Yes
Rocky View	Rocky View County	Yes	Yes
Rodef	Lamont County		Yes
Rol-Ana Park	Sturgeon County		Yes
Rolling Forest Estates	Strathcona County		Yes
Rolling Glory Estates	Beaver County		Yes
Rolling Heights	Parkland County		Yes
Rolling Hills	Parkland County		Yes
Rolling Meadows	Parkland County		Yes
Rolling Range Estates	Rocky View County		Yes
Rolling View Estates	Parkland County		Yes
Roma	Municipal District of Peace No. 135	Yes	Yes
Roma Junction	Municipal District of Peace No. 135	Yes	Yes
Roman Estates	Strathcona County		Yes
Ronalane	Cypress County	Yes	Yes
Ronan	Lac Ste. Anne County	Yes	Yes
Roros	Municipal District of Wainwright No. 61	Yes	Yes
Rosal Acres	Sturgeon County		Yes
Rose Burn Estate	Strathcona County		Yes
Rose Lynn	Special Area No. 2	Yes	Yes
Rosebeg	Cypress County		Yes
Rosebud Creek	Wheatland County		Yes
Rosedale	Drumheller		Yes
Rosedale	Lacombe County		Yes
Rosedale Station	Drumheller	Yes	Yes
Rosedale Valley	Lacombe County	Yes	
Roselea	County of Barrhead No. 11	Yes	Yes
Rosenheim	Municipal District of Provost No. 52	Yes	Yes
Rosevear	Yellowhead County	Yes	Yes
Rosewood	Rocky View County		Yes
Rosewood Beach	Parkland County		Yes
Roslaire Estates	Parkland County		Yes
Rossbrooke Estates	Strathcona County		Yes
Rosscarrock	Calgary		Yes
Rossian	Lac La Biche County		Yes
Rossington	Westlock County	Yes	Yes
Rosyth	Municipal District of Provost No. 52		Yes
Round Valley	Brazeau County	Yes	Yes
Roundhill	Camrose County		Yes
Roxana	Municipal District of Smoky River No. 130		Yes
Roxboro	Calgary		Yes
Royal	Cypress County		Yes
Royal Estates	Strathcona County		Yes
Royal Gardens	Strathcona County		Yes
Royal Glenn Estates	Beaver County		Yes
Royal Park	County of Minburn No. 27	Yes	Yes
Royal Park	Parkland County		Yes
Royalties	Foothills County	Yes	Yes
Royce	Clear Hills County	Yes	Yes
Roydale	Lac Ste. Anne County	Yes	Yes
Roytal	Cypress County	Yes	Yes
Ruarkville	Kneehill County		Yes
Rush Lake	Cardston County	Yes	
Russian Colony	Lac La Biche County		Yes
Rusylvia	County of Two Hills No. 21	Yes	Yes
Ryedale Estates	Strathcona County		Yes
Sabine	County of Stettler No. 6	Yes	Yes
Saddle Lake	Saddle Lake 125	Yes	Yes
Salt Prairie	Big Lakes County	Yes	Yes
Salt Prairie Settlement	Big Lakes County		Yes
Sandholm Beach	Leduc County		Yes
Sandstone	Foothills County		Yes
Sandy Beach	Improvement District No. 13		Yes
Sandy Heights	Parkland County		Yes
Sandy Lane	County of Grande Prairie No. 1		Yes
Sandy Lanes	County of Grande Prairie No. 1		Yes
Sandy Rapids	Regional Municipality of Wood Buffalo		Yes
Sandy Ridge	Parkland County		Yes
Sandy Ridge Estates	County of Grande Prairie No. 1		Yes
Sarcee Junction	Calgary		Yes
Sarrail	Athabasca County		Yes
Saskatchewan River Crossing	Improvement District No. 9	Yes	Yes
Saskatoon Lake	County of Grande Prairie No. 1		Yes
Saulteaux	Municipal District of Lesser Slave River No. 124	Yes	Yes
Saunders	Clearwater County	Yes	Yes
Savanna	Crowsnest Pass	Yes	Yes
Savanna	Saddle Hills County	Yes	
Saville Farm	Municipal District of Wainwright No. 61	Yes	Yes
Sawback	Improvement District No. 9	Yes	Yes
Sawdy	Athabasca County	Yes	Yes
Scapa	Special Area No. 2	Yes	Yes
Scenic View Estates	Parkland County		Yes
Scollard	County of Stettler No. 6	Yes	Yes
Sconadale	Strathcona County		Yes
Sconaglen Estates	Strathcona County		Yes
Scope	Municipal District of Taber		Yes
Scot Haven	Strathcona County		Yes
Scotfield	Special Area No. 2		Yes
Scotford	Strathcona County	Yes	Yes
Scotswood	Municipal District of Fairview No. 136	Yes	Yes
Scottsdale Estates	Leduc County		Yes
Scully Creek	County of Northern Lights		Yes
Seebe	Stoney 142, 143, 144	Yes	Yes
Sentinel	Crowsnest Pass	Yes	Yes
Shady Acres	Parkland County		Yes
Shady Lanes	Strathcona County		Yes
Shady Pine Trailer Park	Red Deer County		Yes
Shaftesbury Settlement	Municipal District of Peace No. 135		Yes
Shaftsbury Settlement	Municipal District of Peace No. 135		Yes
Shale Banks	Improvement District No. 12		Yes
Shalka	County of Two Hills No. 21		Yes
Shandro	Lamont County		Yes
Shannon Meadows	Parkland County		Yes
Shantz	Mountain View County	Yes	Yes
Sharples	Kneehill County	Yes	Yes
Sharrow	Special Area No. 2	Yes	Yes
Shaver	County of Grande Prairie No. 1		Yes
Shaw	Yellowhead County	Yes	Yes
Sheerness	Special Area No. 2	Yes	Yes
Shepard	Calgary		Yes
Shepenge	County of Two Hills No. 21		Yes
Sherman Park Subdivision	Camrose County		Yes
Sherwin	Parkland County		Yes
Sherwood Place	Strathcona County		Yes
Shil Shol	Sturgeon County		Yes
Shining Bank	Yellowhead County	Yes	Yes
Shoal Creek	Westlock County	Yes	Yes
Shonts	Beaver County	Yes	Yes
Sidcup	County of Vermilion River	Yes	Yes
Sierra Grand Estates	Strathcona County		Yes
Siksika	Siksika 146	Yes	
Silver Bell Estates	Parkland County		Yes
Silver Birch Farms	County of Vermilion River		Yes
Silver Birch Hills	Strathcona County		Yes
Silver Creek	Woodlands County		Yes
Silver Diamond Estates	Parkland County		Yes
Silver Heights	County of Paintearth No. 18	Yes	Yes
Silver Heights	County of Paintearth No. 18		Yes
Silver Sands Estates	Parkland County		Yes
Silver Springs	Calgary		Yes
Silver Valley	Saddle Hills County	Yes	Yes
Silverchief Subdivision	Sturgeon County		Yes
Silverwood	Municipal District of Spirit River No. 133	Yes	Yes
Silvestre	County of Grande Prairie No. 1		Yes
Simmons	Strathcona County		Yes
Simon Lakes	Woodland Cree 226	Yes	Yes
Simons Valley	Calgary		Yes
Simpson Grange	Strathcona County		Yes
Singer Acres	Parkland County		Yes
Singing Hill Estates	Parkland County		Yes
Sion	County of Barrhead No. 11	Yes	Yes
Sixth Bridge	Jasper		Yes
Skaro	Lamont County	Yes	Yes
Skyglen	Sturgeon County		Yes
Skyline Gardens	Parkland County		Yes
Skyline Trailer Court	Lethbridge		Yes
Slavey Creek	Mackenzie County		Yes
Slawa	County of Two Hills No. 21		Yes
Smith Lake	Municipal District of Bonnyville No. 87		Yes
Smithfield	Parkland County	Yes	Yes
Smithmill	County of Northern Lights		Yes
Smithson Acres	Strathcona County		Yes
Smoky Heights	County of Grande Prairie No. 1		Yes
Snaring	Improvement District No. 12	Yes	Yes
Sniatyn	Lamont County		Yes
Snug Cove	Lac La Biche County	Yes	Yes
Soda Lake	County of Two Hills No. 21		Yes
Solomon	Yellowhead County		Yes
Sorensens Park	Parkland County		Yes
Sounding Lake	Special Area No. 4	Yes	Yes
South Bailey	Strathcona County		Yes
South Calling Lake	Northern Sunrise County		Yes
South Ferriby	County of Vermilion River		Yes
South Looking Lake	Leduc County		Yes
South Park Village	Red Deer County		Yes
South Parkdale	Parkland County		Yes
South Pine Valley Estates	County of Grande Prairie No. 1		Yes
South Queensdale Place	Strathcona County		Yes
South Seba Beach	Parkland County		Yes
South Woodland Acres	Parkland County		Yes
Southesk	County of Newell	Yes	Yes
Southwood	Calgary		Yes
Southwood Park	Leduc County		Yes
Spanish Oaks	Parkland County		Yes
Spirit River Settlement	Municipal District of Spirit River No. 133		Yes
Spondin	Special Area No. 2	Yes	Yes
Spray Lakes	Municipal District of Bighorn No. 8		Yes
Spring Hills	Parkland County		Yes
Spring Point	Municipal District of Willow Creek No. 26		Yes
Springbank Meadows	Rocky View County		Yes
Springburn	Northern Sunrise County		Yes
Springdale	Ponoka County	Yes	Yes
Springgate Estates	Rocky View County		Yes
Springhill Estate	Strathcona County		Yes
Springland Estates	Rocky View County		Yes
Springpark	County of St. Paul No. 19		Yes
Springridge	Municipal District of Pincher Creek No. 9		Yes
Springshire Estates	Rocky View County		Yes
Springtree Park	County of Wetaskiwin No. 10		Yes
Spruce Bend Estate	Strathcona County		Yes
Spruce Bluff	Parkland County		Yes
Spruce Cliff	Calgary		Yes
Spruce Lane	Lac Ste. Anne County		Yes
Spruce Lane Acres	Red Deer County		Yes
Spruce Meadows	Calgary		Yes
Spruce Ridge	Parkland County		Yes
Spruce Valley	Athabasca County	Yes	Yes
Spruce Valley Estates	Parkland County		Yes
Sprucefield	Smoky Lake County	Yes	Yes
Sprucehill Park	Parkland County		Yes
Sprucewood Subdivision	County of Grande Prairie No. 1		Yes
Spurfield	Municipal District of Lesser Slave River No. 124		Yes
Sputinow	Fishing Lake Metis Settlement	Yes	Yes
St. Albert Settlement	Sturgeon County		Yes
St. Albert Trail	Edmonton		Yes
St. Andrews Heights	Calgary		Yes
St. Brides	County of St. Paul No. 19	Yes	Yes
St. Francis	Leduc County	Yes	Yes
St. Georges Heights	Calgary		Yes
St. George's Island	Calgary		Yes
St. Kilda	County of Warner No. 5		Yes
St. Patrick's Island	Calgary		Yes
St. Paul Beach	County of St. Paul No. 19		Yes
St. Paul Junction	Edmonton		Yes
Stand Off	Blood 148	Yes	Yes
Stanger	Lac Ste. Anne County	Yes	Yes
Stanley Park	Calgary		Yes
Stanmore	Special Area No. 2		Yes
Staplehurst	County of Vermilion River	Yes	Yes
Star Lake	Parkland County		Yes
Star Lake Estates	Parkland County		Yes
Starlight	Tsuut'ina 145	Yes	Yes
Stauffer	Clearwater County	Yes	Yes
Ste Anne	Lac Ste. Anne County		Yes
Steen River	Mackenzie County	Yes	Yes
Steeper	Yellowhead County		Yes
Sterco	Yellowhead County		Yes
Stettin	Lac Ste. Anne County	Yes	Yes
Steveville	County of Newell		Yes
Stewart	Lethbridge County		Yes
Stewart Siding	Lethbridge County		Yes
Stewartfield	County of Barrhead No. 11	Yes	Yes
Stirlingville	Mountain View County	Yes	Yes
Stobart	Wheatland County	Yes	Yes
Stolberg	Clearwater County	Yes	Yes
Stonelaw	Starland County	Yes	Yes
Stony Brook Gardens	Parkland County		Yes
Stony Lake	County of St. Paul No. 19	Yes	
Stonybrook Gardens	Parkland County		Yes
Stoppington	Special Area No. 2		Yes
Stornham	Cypress County		Yes
Stowe	Municipal District of Willow Creek No. 26		Yes
Strachan	Clearwater County	Yes	Yes
Strangmuir	Wheatland County	Yes	Yes
Strathcona Heights	Sturgeon County	Yes	
Strawberry Hill Estates	Leduc County		Yes
Stry	Smoky Lake County	Yes	Yes
Stubno	County of Two Hills No. 21		Yes
Sturgeon	Sturgeon County		Yes
Sturgeon Creek Subdivision	Sturgeon County		Yes
Sturgeon Crest Subdivision	Sturgeon County		Yes
Sturgeon Heights	Municipal District of Greenview No. 16	Yes	Yes
Sturgeon Heights	Sturgeon County		Yes
Sturgeon Lake	Sturgeon Lake 154	Yes	
Sturgeon Lake Settlement	Municipal District of Greenview No. 16		Yes
Sturgeon Valley Estates	Sturgeon County		Yes
Sturgeon Valley Vista	Sturgeon County		Yes
Sturgeon View Estates	Sturgeon County		Yes
Styal	Yellowhead County	Yes	Yes
Sugden	County of St. Paul No. 19	Yes	Yes
Sullivan Lake	County of Paintearth No. 18	Yes	Yes
Summer Brook	Sturgeon County		Yes
Summer View Heights	Parkland County		Yes
Summerbrook Estates	Sturgeon County		Yes
Summerlea	County of Barrhead No. 11		Yes
Summerview	Municipal District of Pincher Creek No. 9	Yes	Yes
Sun Hill Estates	Strathcona County		Yes
Sunalta	Calgary		Yes
Sundance	Parkland County	Yes	Yes
Sundance Meadows	Parkland County		Yes
Sundown Estates	Parkland County		Yes
Sunhaven	Sunbreaker Cove		Yes
Sunland	Lamont County		Yes
Sunnydale	Special Area No. 3	Yes	Yes
Sunnyside	Ponoka County		Yes
Sunnyside Park	Parkland County		Yes
Sunnyville	Leduc County		Yes
Sunrise Trailer Court	Vauxhall		Yes
Sunset Acres	Lethbridge County		Yes
Sunset Bay	Lac La Biche County		Yes
Sunset Beach	County of St. Paul No. 19		Yes
Sunset Beach	Municipal District of Bonnyville No. 87		Yes
Sunset House	Big Lakes County	Yes	Yes
Sunset Mobile Village	Medicine Hat		Yes
Sunset View Acres	Parkland County		Yes
Sunset View Beach	Municipal District of Bonnyville No. 87		Yes
Sunwapta	Improvement District No. 12		Yes
Surrey Lane Acreages	Parkland County		Yes
Susa Creek	Municipal District of Greenview No. 16		Yes
Swan City Trailer Court	County of Grande Prairie No. 1		Yes
Swan Landing	Yellowhead County		Yes
Sweathouse Creek	Municipal District of Greenview No. 16	Yes	Yes
Sweet Water	County of Northern Lights		Yes
Sweetgrass Landing	Improvement District No. 24	Yes	Yes
Swiss Valley	Parkland County		Yes
Sylvan Glen	Westlock County	Yes	Yes
Sylvester	County of Grande Prairie No. 1		Yes
T + E Trailer Park	Grande Prairie		Yes
Tagore Estates	Lamont County		Yes
Talbot	County of Paintearth No. 18	Yes	Yes
Tanglewood Estates	Strathcona County		Yes
Taplow	Special Area No. 2	Yes	Yes
Tar Island	Regional Municipality of Wood Buffalo	Yes	Yes
Taylor	Kneehill County		Yes
Taylorville	Cardston County	Yes	Yes
Tempest	Lethbridge County	Yes	Yes
Temple	Improvement District No. 9		Yes
Tennion	Lethbridge County		Yes
Terence View Estates	County of St. Paul No. 19		Yes
Terrace Heights	Edmonton		Yes
Terralta Estates	Parkland County		Yes
Texaco Bonnie Glen Camp	County of Wetaskiwin No. 10		Yes
The Breakers	Lacombe County		Yes
The Dunes	County of Grande Prairie No. 1		Yes
The Narrows	Municipal District of Greenview No. 16	Yes	
Thelma	Cypress County		Yes
Thompson Subdivision	County of Wetaskiwin No. 10		Yes
Thordarson	Municipal District of Greenview No. 16		Yes
Thorncliffe	Calgary		Yes
Three Creeks	Northern Sunrise County	Yes	Yes
Throne	County of Paintearth No. 18	Yes	Yes
Tidan Heights	Strathcona County		Yes
Tiebecke Estates	Leduc County		Yes
Tieland	Municipal District of Lesser Slave River No. 124	Yes	Yes
Tiger Lily	County of Barrhead No. 11	Yes	Yes
Timeu	Woodlands County	Yes	Yes
Tinchebray	County of Paintearth No. 18	Yes	Yes
Tod Creek	Municipal District of Pincher Creek No. 9	Yes	Yes
Toki Estates	Rocky View County		Yes
Tolland	County of Vermilion River	Yes	Yes
Tolman	Kneehill County	Yes	Yes
Tolstad	Municipal District of Greenview No. 16		Yes
Topland	Woodlands County	Yes	Yes
Torlea	Beaver County	Yes	Yes
Tothill	Cypress County	Yes	Yes
Tower Acres	Parkland County		Yes
Tower Ridge Estates	Rocky View County		Yes
Towers	Wheatland County		Yes
Town Lake	County of Wetaskiwin No. 10	Yes	Yes
Trade Winds Trailer Court	Yellowhead County		Yes
Trafalgar Heights	Parkland County		Yes
Tranquility Hills	Parkland County		Yes
Trans Oak Estates	Strathcona County		Yes
Treasure Island Estates	Leduc County		Yes
Trefoil	Special Area No. 2	Yes	Yes
Trestle Ridge	Sturgeon County		Yes
Trevithick	Strathcona County	Yes	
Trevithick Subdivision	Strathcona County		Yes
Tri Lakes Manor	Lac Ste. Anne County		Yes
Triangle	Big Lakes County	Yes	Yes
Triple-L-Trailer Court	County of Grande Prairie No. 1		Yes
Tristram	Ponoka County	Yes	Yes
Trochu Trailer Court	Trochu		Yes
Trout Lake	Municipal District of Opportunity No. 17	Yes	Yes
Trueman Subdivision	Red Deer County		Yes
Truman	Municipal District of Bonnyville No. 87	Yes	Yes
Tudor	Wheatland County	Yes	Yes
Turcotte Division	Municipal District of Bonnyville No. 87		Yes
Turfside Park	Sturgeon County		Yes
Turner	Calgary		Yes
Tuttle	Red Deer County	Yes	Yes
Tuxedo Park	Calgary		Yes
Tweedie	Lac La Biche County	Yes	Yes
Twin Island Air Park	Strathcona County		Yes
Twin Ravines	Parkland County		Yes
Twin River	Cardston County		Yes
Twining	Kneehill County	Yes	Yes
Two Creeks	Municipal District of Greenview No. 16	Yes	Yes
Two Guns	Tsuut'ina 145	Yes	Yes
Two Lakes	Smoky Lake County		Yes
Two Rivers Estates	Yellowhead County		Yes
Twomey	Camrose County	Yes	Yes
Ukalta	Lamont County		Yes
Ullin	Clearwater County		Yes
Uncas	Strathcona County	Yes	Yes
Upper Manor Estates	Sturgeon County		Yes
Upper Viscount Estates	Sturgeon County		Yes
Upper Viscount Estates Subdivision	Sturgeon County		Yes
Usona	County of Wetaskiwin No. 10	Yes	Yes
Val Soucy	Thorhild County		Yes
Valaspen Place	Parkland County		Yes
Vale	Cypress County		Yes
Valhalla	County of Grande Prairie No. 1	Yes	Yes
Valhalla Acres	Lac Ste. Anne County		Yes
Valley Drive	Brazeau County		Yes
Valley Drive Acres	Brazeau County		Yes
Valley Point	Strathcona County		Yes
Valley View Acres	Leduc County		Yes
Valleyview Acres	Foothills County		Yes
Vanesti	County of Vermilion River		Yes
Vanrena	Municipal District of Fairview No. 136	Yes	Yes
Vega	County of Barrhead No. 11	Yes	Yes
Veldt	County of Paintearth No. 18	Yes	Yes
Verdant Valley	Starland County		Yes
Verden Place	Strathcona County		Yes
Verger	County of Newell	Yes	Yes
Vermilion Chutes	Mackenzie County		Yes
Vetchland	Clearwater County		Yes
Vezeau Beach	Municipal District of Bonnyville No. 87		Yes
Victor	Starland County	Yes	Yes
Victoria Settlement	Smoky Lake County		Yes
Viewmar Estates	Ponoka County		Yes
Viewpoint	Camrose County	Yes	Yes
Viewpoint Estates	Parkland County		Yes
Viola Beach	County of Wetaskiwin No. 10		Yes
Volmer	Sturgeon County	Yes	Yes
Voyageur Estates	Strathcona County		Yes
Wabasca Settlement	Northern Sunrise County		Yes
Wabasca-Desmarais	Municipal District of Opportunity No. 17		Yes
Wabiskaw Settlement	Northern Sunrise County		Yes
Wahstao	Smoky Lake County		Yes
Wapiti	Municipal District of Greenview No. 16	Yes	Yes
Warawa Estates	Lac Ste. Anne County		Yes
Warden	County of Stettler No. 6	Yes	Yes
Warden Junction	County of Stettler No. 6		Yes
Warnock Acres	Parkland County		Yes
Warrensville	County of Northern Lights	Yes	Yes
Warrensville Centre	County of Northern Lights	Yes	Yes
Warwick	County of Minburn No. 27	Yes	Yes
Wasel	Smoky Lake County	Yes	Yes
Wastina	Special Area No. 3	Yes	Yes
Water Valley	Mountain View County	Yes	Yes
Waterdale Park	Sturgeon County		Yes
Waterhole	Municipal District of Fairview No. 136	Yes	Yes
Waterton Lakes National Park	Improvement District No. 4		Yes
Waterways	Regional Municipality of Wood Buffalo		Yes
Watts	Special Area No. 2		Yes
Waugh	Westlock County	Yes	Yes
Waybrook	Sturgeon County		Yes
Wayne	Drumheller	Yes	Yes
Weald	Yellowhead County		Yes
Weasel Creek	Thorhild County	Yes	Yes
Weberville	County of Northern Lights	Yes	Yes
Webster	County of Grande Prairie No. 1	Yes	Yes
Weed Creek	Leduc County	Yes	Yes
Weekend Estates	Parkland County		Yes
Wellington Estates	Strathcona County		Yes
Wendel Heights	Parkland County		Yes
Wendel Place	Parkland County		Yes
Wendel Place Park	Parkland County		Yes
Wenham Valley	County of Wetaskiwin No. 10	Yes	Yes
Wernerville	Edmonton		Yes
Wesley Creek	Northern Sunrise County		Yes
Wessex	Mountain View County		Yes
West Bank Acres	Brazeau County		Yes
West Bluff Road Subdivision	Rocky View County		Yes
West Country Estates	Parkland County		Yes
West Eighty Estates	Parkland County		Yes
West Gentry Estates	Parkland County		Yes
West Hill Acres	Parkland County		Yes
West Lake Estates	Parkland County		Yes
West Parkdale	Parkland County		Yes
West Peace River	Peace River		Yes
West Ridge Estates	Red Deer County		Yes
West Thirty-Five Estates	Parkland County		Yes
West Whitecroft	Strathcona County		Yes
West Wind Trailer Park	Athabasca County		Yes
West Wingham	Special Area No. 2		Yes
Westbrook Crescent	Parkland County		Yes
Westbrooke Crescents	Parkland County		Yes
Westcott	Mountain View County	Yes	Yes
Westerdale	Mountain View County	Yes	Yes
Westering Heights	Parkland County		Yes
Western Monarch	Drumheller		Yes
Westerner Trailer Court	Clearwater County		Yes
Westland Park	Parkland County		Yes
Westpark Estates	Strathcona County		Yes
Westside Trailer Park	Lethbridge		Yes
Westview Acres	Lethbridge County		Yes
Westview Village Trailer Park N.	Edmonton		Yes
Westview Village Trailer Park S.	Edmonton		Yes
Westward Acres	Parkland County		Yes
Westward Ho	Mountain View County	Yes	Yes
Whiskey Gap	Cardston County	Yes	Yes
Whispering Hills	Beaver County		Yes
Whispering Pines	Parkland County		Yes
Whitburn	Saddle Hills County	Yes	Yes
White Elk	Tsuut'ina 145	Yes	Yes
White Gull	Athabasca County	Yes	Yes
Whitecroft	Strathcona County	Yes	Yes
Whiteman Beach	Smoky Lake County		Yes
Whitemud Creek	Municipal District of Smoky River No. 130		Yes
Whitewood Sands	Parkland County		Yes
Whitla	County of Forty Mile No. 8	Yes	Yes
Whitney	Lethbridge County	Yes	Yes
Whitney Lake Mobile Home Park	County of St. Paul No. 19		Yes
Wild Hay	Yellowhead County		Yes
Wild Horse	Cypress County		Yes
Wild Rose	Red Deer County		Yes
Wild Rose Country Estates	Rocky View County		Yes
Wild Rose Park	Parkland County		Yes
Wildcat	Rocky View County	Yes	Yes
Wildlife Park	Sturgeon County		Yes
Wildmere	County of Vermilion River	Yes	Yes
Wildwood Village	Strathcona County		Yes
Willesden Green	Ponoka County	Yes	Yes
Williams Park	Strathcona County		Yes
Williams Subdivision	Rocky View County		Yes
Willow Creek	Drumheller		Yes
Willow Lake Estates	Strathcona County		Yes
Willow Park	Parkland County		Yes
Willow Ridge	Parkland County		Yes
Willow Ridge Estates	Parkland County		Yes
Willow Trail	Regional Municipality of Wood Buffalo		Yes
Willow Wood Subdivision	County of Grande Prairie No. 1		Yes
Willowdale Estates	Strathcona County		Yes
Willowglen Estates	County of Stettler No. 6		Yes
Willowhaven Estates	County of Wetaskiwin No. 10		Yes
Willowlea	County of Vermilion River	Yes	Yes
Willowood Estates	County of Grande Prairie No. 1		Yes
Wilson	Lethbridge County	Yes	Yes
Wilson Beach	Lacombe County		Yes
Winagami	Municipal District of Smoky River No. 130		Yes
Windermere Country Estates	Edmonton		Yes
Windfall	Woodlands County	Yes	Yes
Windsor Creek	County of Grande Prairie No. 1		Yes
Windsor Park	Calgary		Yes
Winfield Heights	Parkland County		Yes
Winfield Heights	Strathcona County		Yes
Winniandy	Municipal District of Greenview No. 16		Yes
Winnifred	County of Forty Mile No. 8	Yes	Yes
Winterburn	Edmonton		Yes
Wintergreen	Rocky View County		Yes
Wisdom	Cypress County		Yes
Wiste	Special Area No. 4	Yes	Yes
Wizard Heights	County of Wetaskiwin No. 10		Yes
Wolf	Tsuut'ina 145	Yes	Yes
Wolf Creek	Yellowhead County	Yes	Yes
Wolyn	Regional Municipality of Wood Buffalo		Yes
Wood Buffalo National Park	Improvement District No. 24		Yes
Woodbend	Edmonton		Yes
Woodbend Crescents	Parkland County		Yes
Woodbend Place	Parkland County		Yes
Woodglen	Flagstaff County		Yes
Woodgrove	Thorhild County		Yes
Woodlake Estates	County of Grande Prairie No. 1		Yes
Woodland Acres	County of Grande Prairie No. 1		Yes
Woodland Acres	Parkland County		Yes
Woodland Bay	Lac Ste. Anne County		Yes
Woodland Downs	Strathcona County		Yes
Woodland Estates	Clearwater County		Yes
Woodland Hills	Red Deer County		Yes
Woodland Park	Parkland County		Yes
Woodland Park	Ponoka County		Yes
Woodland Park	Strathcona County		Yes
Woodridge	Parkland County		Yes
Woodridge Estates	Parkland County		Yes
Woodridge Estates	Sturgeon County		Yes
Woodridge Heights	Camrose County		Yes
Woodvale Park	Leduc County		Yes
Woodville Estates	Strathcona County		Yes
Woody Nook	Lacombe County		Yes
Woolchester	Cypress County	Yes	Yes
Wye Haven	Strathcona County		Yes
Wye Knott Village	Strathcona County		Yes
Wyeclif	Strathcona County	Yes	Yes
Wyeknot Village	Strathcona County		Yes
Wynd	Jasper	Yes	Yes
Ya-Ha-Tinda Ranch	Clearwater County		Yes
Yates	Yellowhead County	Yes	Yes
Yellowhead Estates	Parkland County		Yes
Yeoford	County of Wetaskiwin No. 10	Yes	Yes
Zawale	Lamont County		Yes

== See also ==
- List of census divisions of Alberta
- List of communities in Alberta
- List of designated places in Alberta
- List of ghost towns in Alberta
- List of hamlets in Alberta
- List of municipalities in Alberta
  - List of cities in Alberta
  - List of towns in Alberta
  - List of summer villages in Alberta
  - List of villages in Alberta
- List of population centres in Alberta
- List of settlements in Alberta
