= Pleasant View, Alberta (disambiguation) =

Pleasant View, Alberta may refer to:

- Pleasant View, Alberta, a locality in Athabasca County, Alberta
- Pleasant View, Brazeau County, Alberta, a locality in Brazeau County, Alberta
- Pleasant View, Strathcona County, a locality in Strathcona County, Alberta
