= Cappon =

Cappon may refer to:

Location

- Cappon, Alberta, rural locality in Alberta, Canada

Surname

- Franklin Cappon (1900–1961), American college football and college basketball player and coach
- Lester J. Cappon (1900–1981), American historian and documentary editor
- Paul Cappon, Canadian academic, administrator, medical doctor, politician, and activist

== See also ==
- Cappon magro, an elaborate Genoese salad of seafood and vegetables over hardtack arranged into a decorative pyramid and dressed with a rich sauce
- Isaac Cappon House, constructed as a private house, located at 228 West 9th Street in Holland, Michigan
