= Beach Corner, Alberta =

Coordinates: 53°33′21.6″N 114°07′28.6″W

Location of Beach Corner Alberta

Beach Corner is an unincorporated community in central Alberta in Parkland County, located on Highway 16A, 43 kilometres (27 mi) west of Edmonton. To the east of the settlement is Hubbles Lake, itself surrounded by several waterside resorts.

Beach Corner, Alberta is the site of a notable German Lutheran community.
