= Improvement District No. 13 =

Improvement district in Alberta, Canada

Improvement District No. 13 Improvement District No. 13 (Elk Island)
- Improvement district
- Location within Alberta
- Coordinates: 53°36′N 112°53′W
- Country: Canada
- Province: Alberta
- Region: Northern Alberta
- Census division: No. 10
- Established: April 1, 1958
- Renumbered: January 1, 1969

Government
  - Governing body: Alberta Municipal Affairs (AMA)
  - Minister of AMA: Ric McIver
  - CAO: Troy Shewchuk
  - MLA: Jackie Armstrong-Homeniuk

Area (2021)
  - Land: 165 km^{2} (64 sq mi)

Population (2021)
  - Total: 0
  - Density: 0/km^{2} (0/sq mi)
- Time zone: UTC−06:00 (Alberta Time)

Improvement District No. 13, or Improvement District No. 13 (Elk Island), is an improvement district in Alberta, Canada. Coextensive with Elk Island National Park in central Alberta, the improvement district provides local governance for lands within the park.

== History ==
Improvement District (ID) No. 13 was originally formed as ID No. 97 on April 1, 1958. ID No. 97 was renumbered to ID No. 13 on January 1, 1969.

== Geography ==
=== Communities and localities ===
There are no urban municipalities, hamlets, or urban service areas within Improvement District No. 13.

The following localities are within Improvement District No. 13.

Localities

- Elk Island National Park
- Sandy Beach

== Demographics ==
In the 2021 Census of Population conducted by Statistics Canada, Improvement District No. 13 had a population of 0 living in 0 of its 0 total private dwellings, no change from its 2016 population of 0. With a land area of 165 km^{2} (64 sq mi), it had a population density of 0.0/km^{2} (0.0/sq mi) in 2021.

In the 2016 Census of Population conducted by Statistics Canada, Improvement District No. 13 had a population of 0 living in 1 of its 6 total private dwellings, a change of −100% from its 2011 population of 10. With a land area of 165.05 km^{2} (63.73 sq mi), it had a population density of 0.0/km^{2} (0.0/sq mi) in 2016.

== Government ==
Improvement District No. 13 is governed by Alberta's Minister of Municipal Affairs.

== See also ==
- List of communities in Alberta
