= McDermott, Alberta =

McDermott
- Designated place
- Location of McDermott McDermott (Canada)
- Coordinates: 49.731°N 112.940°W
- Country: Canada
- Province: Alberta
- Region: Southern Alberta
- Census division: 2
- Municipal district: Lethbridge County

Government
  - Type: Unincorporated
  - Governing body: Lethbridge County Council

Area (2021)
  - Land: 1.29 km^{2} (0.50 sq mi)

Population (2021)
  - Total: 54
  - Density: 42/km^{2} (110/sq mi)
- Time zone: UTC−06:00 (Alberta Time)
- Area codes: 403, 587, 825

McDermott is an unincorporated community in Alberta, Canada within the Lethbridge County that is recognized as a designated place by Statistics Canada. Made up of residential acreages, some including light industrial activity, it is located on the west side of Range Road 224, 1.0 km (0.62 mi) south of Highway 3.

== Demographics ==
In the 2021 Census of Population conducted by Statistics Canada, McDermott had a population of 54 living in 19 of its 21 total private dwellings, a change of −25% from its 2016 population of 72. With a land area of 1.29 km^{2} (0.50 sq mi), it had a population density of 41.9/km^{2} (108.4/sq mi) in 2021.

As a designated place in the 2016 Census of Population conducted by Statistics Canada, McDermott had a population of 72 living in 22 of its 22 total private dwellings, a change of 5.9% from its 2011 population of 68. With a land area of 1.29 km^{2} (0.50 sq mi), it had a population density of 55.8/km^{2} (144.6/sq mi) in 2016.

== See also ==
- List of communities in Alberta
- List of designated places in Alberta
