= Matthews Crossing, Alberta =

Matthews Crossing is a river crossing on the Pembina River in the Canadian province of Alberta approximately 10 km (6.2 mi) downstream from Entwistle.

== History ==
This river crossing was used by Indigenous people and packers before it was named. A pack trail, known as Jock's Trail, Jack's Trail or the Shining Bank Trail left the west end of Isle Lake, crossed the Pembina at this location. A packer named N. H. Jock used this trail to pack supplies to stores along the trail to the Peace River Country. A post office was established on the east side of the river in 1913 and operated until 1923. It was named for M. H. Matthews, the first postmaster.

In about 1920, a ferry was installed at Matthews Crossing. A succession of returned WWI veterans served as ferrymen. Eventually the ferry was moved down-river to Sangudo.

Matthews Crossing School was built in 1935 and opened in 1936 with 38 students. Grades 1-9 were taught in the one-room schoolhouse. It operated until 1956. The Matthews Crossing Natural Area, more than 700 acres of boreal forest upstream from the crossing, has been designated as a park.
