= Manly, Alberta =

Manly
- Locality
- Location of Manly in Alberta
- Coordinates: 53.57138°N 114.22397°W
- Country: Canada
- Province: Alberta
- Region: Edmonton Metropolitan Region
- Census division: 11
- Municipal district: Parkland County

Government
  - Type: Unincorporated
  - Mayor: Allan Gamble
  - Governing body: Parkland County Council: Natalie Birnie; Allan William Hoefsloot; Phyllis Kobasiuk; Kristina Kowalski; Sally Kucher Johnson; Rob Wiedeman
- Time zone: UTC−7 (MST)
  - Summer (DST): UTC−6 (MDT)
- Postal code span: T7Y
- Area codes: 780, 587, 825

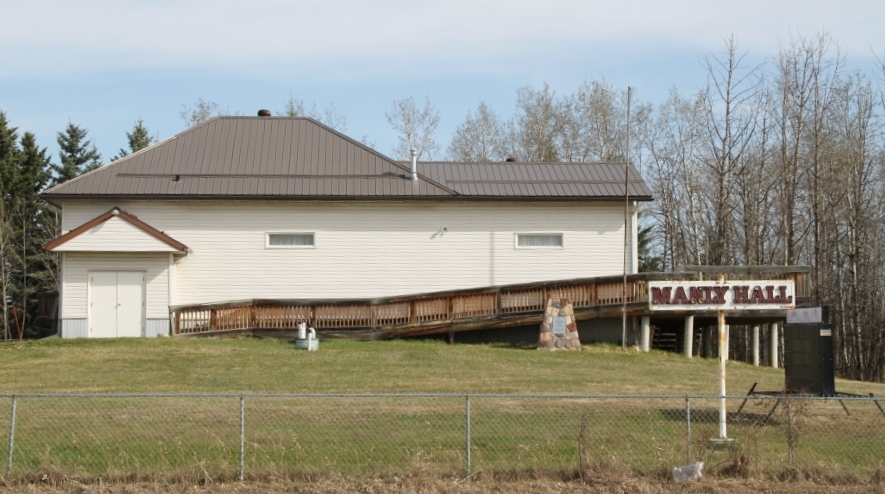
Manly Hall is located on the north side of the Yellowhead Highway, west of the Highway 43 and Yellowhead Highway interchange

Manly is a former locality in Parkland County, Alberta. Manly was named for Manley, England. The first post office opened in Manly in 1908. Manly Corner, the beginning of Highway 43, which goes north to the Alaska Highway, is located in this district.
