= Decrene, Alberta =

Coordinates: 55.200°N 114.167°W

Decrene is a locality in Alberta, Canada. It is located northwest of the Hamlet of Smith and is sparsely inhabited.

Decrene was named for a railroad employee.
