= Namao Ridge and Sturgeon View Estates =

- Designated place
- Location of Namao Ridge and Sturgeon View Estates Namao Ridge and Sturgeon View Estates (Canada)
- Coordinates: 53.767°N 113.473°W
- Country: Canada
- Province: Alberta
- Region: Edmonton Metropolitan Region
- Census division: 11
- Municipal district: Sturgeon County

Government
  - Type: Unincorporated
  - Governing body: Sturgeon County Council

Area (2021)
  - Land: 1.98 km^{2} (0.76 sq mi)

Population (2021)
  - Total: 351
  - Density: 177.6/km^{2} (460/sq mi)
- Time zone: UTC−06:00 (Alberta Time)
- Area codes: 780, 587, 825

Namao Ridge and Sturgeon View Estates is an unincorporated community in Alberta, Canada within Sturgeon County that is recognized as a designated place by Statistics Canada. It is located on the south side of Township Road 554, 0.8 km (0.50 mi) east of Highway 28. Between 2001 and 2021, Statistics Canada referred to Namao Ridge and Sturgeon View Estates as Namao, which was also the name of the nearby Hamlet of Namao 6.0 km (3.7 mi) to the south.

This designated place consists of two country residential subdivisions – Namao Ridge and Sturgeon View Estates. Namao Ridge, or Namao Ridge Estates, and Sturgeon View Estates were separate designated places in 2001.

== Demographics ==
In the 2021 Census of Population conducted by Statistics Canada, Namao Ridge and Sturgeon View Estates had a population of 351 living in 128 of its 134 total private dwellings, a change of 2% from its 2016 population of 344. With a land area of 1.98 km^{2} (0.76 sq mi), it had a population density of 177.3/km^{2} (459.1/sq mi) in 2021.

As a designated place in the 2016 Census of Population conducted by Statistics Canada, Namao Ridge and Sturgeon View Estates had a population of 344 living in 130 of its 130 total private dwellings, a change of −3.6% from its 2011 population of 357. With a land area of 1.92 km^{2} (0.74 sq mi), it had a population density of 179.2/km^{2} (464.0/sq mi) in 2016.

== See also ==
- List of communities in Alberta
- List of designated places in Alberta
