= Rocky Lane, Alberta =

Human settlement in Alberta, Canada

Coordinates: 58°26′45″N 116°15′59″W

Location of Rocky Lane Alberta

Rocky Lane is a locality in northern Alberta, Canada surrounding the Boyer 164 Indian reserve of the Beaver First Nation. It is located 8 km (5.0 mi) south of Highway 58, 51 km (32 mi) east of High Level.

== History ==
Rocky Lane, was settled following WWI by various veterans who received land grants by the government. Another wave of migration came between 1929 and 1931, which saw many settlers move from Saskatchewan to Rocky Lane.

== Amenities ==
The Rocky Lane area features the Rocky Lane Community Hall, completed and opened by the Rocky Lane Agricultural Society in 2011, and the Rocky Lane Nordic Ski Club, which features 13 km (8.1 mi) of cross-country ski trails and equipment rentals. The Machesis Lake Provincial Recreation Area, located to the southwest of Rocky Lane, consists of a lake, day use sites, and overnight campsites.
