= Rossian, Alberta =

Rossian
- Designated place
- Location of Rossian Rossian (Canada)
- Coordinates: 54.953°N 112.374°W
- Country: Canada
- Province: Alberta
- Region: Northern Alberta
- Census division: 12
- Municipal district: Lac La Biche County

Government
  - Type: Unincorporated
  - Governing body: Lac La Biche County Council

Area
  - Land: 0.65 km^{2} (0.25 sq mi)

Population (2016)
  - Total: 113
- Time zone: UTC−06:00 (Alberta Time)
- Area codes: 780, 587, 825

Rossian or Russian colony is an unincorporated community in Alberta, Canada within Lac La Biche County, North of Plamondon, Alberta that is recognized as a designated place by Statistics Canada. It is located on the north side of the La Biche River, 3 km (1.9 mi) northwest of Highway 858.

== Demographics ==
As a designated place in the 2016 Census of Population conducted by Statistics Canada, Rossian recorded a population of 113 living in 30 of its 31 total private dwellings, a change of −14.4% from its 2011 population of 132. With a land area of 0.65 km^{2} (0.25 sq mi), it had a population density of 173.8/km^{2} (450.3/sq mi) in 2016.

As a designated place in the 2011 Census, Rossian had a population of 132 living in 30 of its 34 total dwellings, a 51.7% change from its 2006 population of 87. With a land area of 0.65 km^{2} (0.25 sq mi), it had a population density of 203.1/km^{2} (526/sq mi) in 2011.

Rossian has been populated by Old Believers since the 1970s.

== See also ==
- List of communities in Alberta
