= Fenn, Alberta =

Locality in Alberta, Canada

Coordinates: 52°08′23″N 112°44′54″W

Location of Fenn Alberta

Fenn is an unincorporated locality in central Alberta in the County of Stettler No. 6, located 1 kilometre (0.62 mi) west of Highway 56, 73 kilometres (45 mi) east of Red Deer.
