= Sturgeon Heights, Alberta =

Locality in Alberta, Canada

Coordinates: 55°05′19″N 117°40′27″W

Location of Sturgeon Heights Alberta

Sturgeon Heights is a locality in northern Alberta within the Municipal District of Greenview No. 16, located on Highway 43, 71 kilometres (44 mi) southeast of Grande Prairie.
