= Nojack, Alberta =

Coordinates: 53°36′37″N 115°34′28″W

Location of Nojack Alberta

Nojack is an unincorporated community in central Alberta within Yellowhead County, located on Highway 16, 138 kilometres (86 mi) west of Edmonton, at an elevation of 820 metres (2,690 ft). It was possibly named because of the lack of oil jacks in the area at the time, however Place Names of Alberta says "A hotel and service station were constructed on Hiway #16 approximately four kilometers south of MacKay, with a large amount of credit. The name which is a colloquial term meaning "no money" was chosen and has been perpetuated by local business establishments. The name was officially approved in 1974."

The Nojack Park and campsite is located immediately north of the settlement, along Highway 751.

== See also ==
- List of communities in Alberta
