= Behan, Alberta =

Coordinates: 55.26692°N 111.43514°W

Behan is a locality in Alberta, Canada.

Behan took its name from a lake of the same name, which in turn has the name of the cook of a party of government surveyors.
