= Ferrier, Alberta =

Ferrier Ferrier Acres Ferrier Acres Trailer Court
- Designated place
- Location of Ferrier Acres Trailer Court Ferrier (Canada)
- Coordinates: 52.368°N 115.074°W
- Country: Canada
- Province: Alberta
- Region: Central Alberta
- Census division: 9
- Municipal district: Clearwater County, Alberta

Government
  - Type: Unincorporated
  - Governing body: Clearwater County, Alberta Council

Area (2021)
  - Land: 2.84 km^{2} (1.10 sq mi)

Population (2021)
  - Total: 258
  - Density: 91/km^{2} (240/sq mi)
- Time zone: UTC−06:00 (Alberta Time)
- Area codes: 403, 587, 825

Ferrier, or Ferrier Acres is an unincorporated community in Alberta, Canada within Clearwater County that is recognized as a designated place by Statistics Canada. It is located on the south side of Township Road 393A, 4 km (2.5 mi) west of Highway 11A.

== Demographics ==
In the 2021 Census of Population conducted by Statistics Canada, Ferrier Acres Trailer Court had a population of 258 living in 103 of its 112 total private dwellings, a change of −38.7% from its 2016 population of 421. With a land area of 2.84 km^{2} (1.10 sq mi), it had a population density of 90.8/km^{2} (235.3/sq mi) in 2021.

As a designated place in the 2016 Census of Population conducted by Statistics Canada, Ferrier Acres Trailer Court had a population of 395 living in 149 of its 153 total private dwellings, a change of 65.3% from its 2011 population of 239. With a land area of 2.98 km^{2} (1.15 sq mi), it had a population density of 132.6/km^{2} (343.3/sq mi) in 2016.

== See also ==
- List of communities in Alberta
- List of designated places in Alberta
