= Heart River, Alberta =

Human settlement in Alberta, Canada

Coordinates: 55°35′32″N 116°29′01″W

Location of Heart River in Alberta

Heart River is a settlement in northern Alberta, Canada within Big Lakes County.

It is located at the junction of Highway 679 and Highway 749, approximately 18 kilometers (11 mi) north of High Prairie. It has an elevation of 590 meters (1,940 ft).

South Heart River is near Winagami Wildland Provincial Park.

== See also ==
- List of communities in Alberta
- List of settlements in Alberta
