= Connor Creek, Alberta =

Human settlement in Alberta, Canada

Coordinates: 54.10014°N 115.13549°W

Connor Creek is a locality in Alberta, Canada.

Connor Creek has the name of James Connor, a pioneer citizen.
