= Hubbles Lake (Alberta) =

Lake in Alberta, Canada

- Location within Alberta
- Location: Parkland County, Alberta
- Coordinates: 53.564°N 114.090°W
- Basin countries: Canada
- Max. length: 0.8 km (0.50 mi)
- Max. width: 1.4 km (0.87 mi)
- Surface area: 0.40 km^{2} (0.15 sq mi)
- Average depth: 10.1 m (33 ft)
- Max. depth: 30 m (98 ft)
- Surface elevation: 733 m (2,405 ft)

Hubbles Lake is a lake in Alberta. It is in Parkland County, Alberta, Canada, and is approximately a 20-minute drive on Highway 16 westward out of deep Edmonton.

== Hydrology ==
The lake is formed in a natural depression and has no specific in- or out-flows, being filled principally by direct drainage from the surrounding land and groundwater.

The water in the lake is very clear and quantities of algae are usually low compared to the other lakes in the area. The clear water and surprising depth of Hubbles Lake (30 m) make it a popular destination for local SCUBA divers and occasional swimming and triathlon competitions. No hydrocarbon fueled boats / vehicles are allowed on the lake except for emergency response, making it a safe swimming or canoeing lake.

== Fauna ==
The lake is home to many bird species. The most common birds are; Loons, Common Turns, Griebs, ducks, Canada Geese, Muskrats, Blue Jays, Red Winged Black birds and owls. The most common fish in the lake are Northern Pike and Perch.
