= Riverview Pines Subdivision, Alberta =

Riverview Pines Subdivision
- Designated place
- Location of Riverview Pines Subdivision Riverview Pines Subdivision (Canada)
- Coordinates: 55.088°N 118.962°W
- Country: Canada
- Province: Alberta
- Region: Northern Alberta
- Census division: 19
- Municipal district: County of Grande Prairie No. 1

Government
  - Type: Unincorporated
  - Governing body: County of Grande Prairie No. 1 Council

Area (2021)
  - Land: 0.97 km^{2} (0.37 sq mi)

Population (2021)
  - Total: 86
  - Density: 89/km^{2} (230/sq mi)
- Time zone: UTC−06:00 (Alberta Time)
- Area codes: 780, 587, 825

Riverview Pines Subdivision is an unincorporated community in Alberta, Canada within the County of Grande Prairie No. 1 that is recognized as a designated place by Statistics Canada. It is located on the east side of Range Road 72, 9 km (5.6 mi) south of Highway 43.

== Demographics ==
In the 2021 Census of Population conducted by Statistics Canada, Riverview Pines Subdivision had a population of 86 living in 29 of its 29 total private dwellings, a change of −31.2% from its 2016 population of 125. With a land area of 0.97 km^{2} (0.37 sq mi), it had a population density of 88.7/km^{2} (229.6/sq mi) in 2021.

As a designated place in the 2016 Census of Population conducted by Statistics Canada, Riverview Pines Subdivision had a population of 120 living in 38 of its 38 total private dwellings, a change of 25% from its 2011 population of 96. With a land area of 0.94 km^{2} (0.36 sq mi), it had a population density of 127.7/km^{2} (330.6/sq mi) in 2016.

== See also ==
- List of communities in Alberta
- List of designated places in Alberta
