= Lymburn, Alberta =

Coordinates: 55°20′50″N 119°46′48″W

Location of Lymburn Alberta

Lymburn is a hamlet in northern Alberta, Canada that is under the jurisdiction of the County of Grande Prairie No. 1. It is 8 km (5.0 mi) southwest of Highway 43, approximately 75 km (47 mi) northwest of Grande Prairie. It is situated on a portion of abandoned rail line which once connected Hythe, Alberta and Dawson Creek, British Columbia.

== See also ==
- List of hamlets in Alberta
