= Ballantine, Alberta =

Locality in Lac Ste. Anne County, Alberta, Canada

Ballantine is a locality located within Lac Ste. Anne County in the Canadian province of Alberta. It is located between Oldman Lake and the Pembina River, approximately 23 km (14 mi) southwest of Barrhead.

== History ==
Ballantine was originally called Wild Horse Valley, with the post office called "Wildhorse". In 1903–1904, the Grand Trunk Pacific Railway surveyed and cut both a railway route and wagon trails the Lac Ste. Anne area. One of the trails went from Onion Prairie (later Rich Valley) to Wild Horse Valley. Mail was delivered over this route. The name "Wildhorse" was frequently confused with "Whitehorse" in the Yukon, so in 1914, the post office was renamed Ballantine.

The Ballantine area was covered with large tracts of spruce forest, the raw material for a significant logging and lumber operations, which opened up the land for farming. By 1919 many homesteaders had settled in the area. A community hall had been constructed and was being used for social events, including those sponsored by the United Farmers of Alberta (UFA).
