= Cappon, Alberta =

Settlement in Alberta, Canada

Coordinates: 51.101°N 110.604°W

Cappon is a rural locality in Alberta, Canada.

Cappon has the name of one Professor Cappon, a Queens University faculty member.
