= Sylvan Lake (Alberta) =

- Location within Alberta
- Location: Lacombe County / Red Deer County, Alberta
- Coordinates: 52°21′19″N 114°09′19″W
- Type: Mesotrophic lake
- Primary outflows: Sylvan Creek → Red Deer River
- Catchment area: 102 km^{2} (39 sq mi)
- Basin countries: Canada
- Max. length: 10.1 km (6.3 mi)
- Max. width: 11.5 km (7.1 mi)
- Surface area: 42.8 km^{2} (16.5 sq mi)
- Average depth: 9.6 m (31 ft)
- Max. depth: 18.3 m (60 ft)
- Shore length^{1}: 36.0 km (22.4 mi)
- Surface elevation: 974 m (3,196 ft)
- Settlements: Sylvan Lake
- ^{1} Shore length is not a well-defined measure.

Sylvan Lake is a large lake in central Alberta, Canada. The resort town of Sylvan Lake is established on the shores of the lake, west of the city of Red Deer.

Sylvan Lake is a mesotrophic lake with a total area of 42.8 km^{2} (16.5 sq mi), and a maximum depth of 18.3 m (60 ft). It lies at an elevation of 974 m (3,196 ft).

== Development and conservation ==
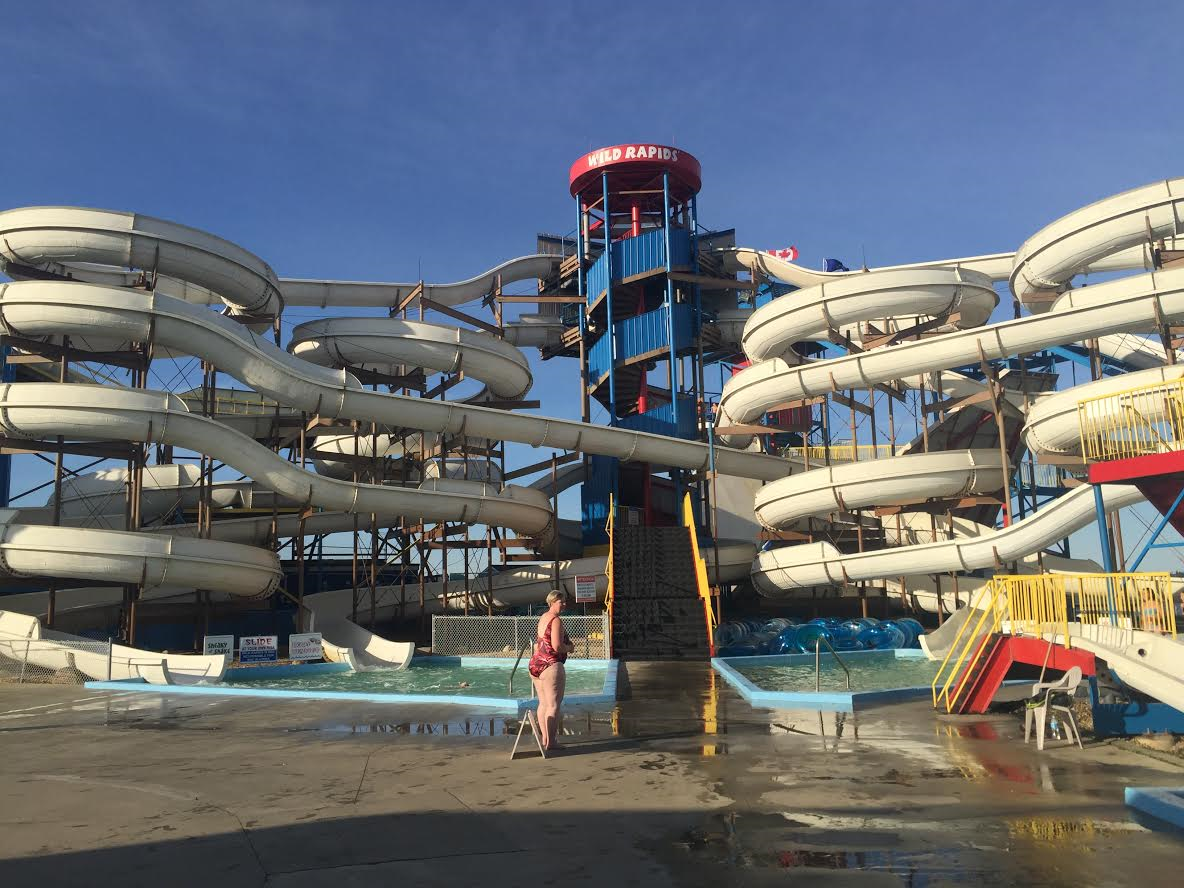
Wild Rapids Waterslides on the shore of Sylvan Lake

Six communities are developed adjacent to the shores of Sylvan Lake. The Town of Sylvan Lake is located on the southeast shore, while five summer villages – Sunbreaker Cove, Birchcliff, Jarvis Bay, Norglenwold and Half Moon Bay – are adjacent to the lake's northeast and southwest shores.

Sylvan Lake is one of the most popular recreational areas in Alberta, with over 1.5 million visitors per year. Water based recreational activities include boating, dragon boat racing, swimming, windsurfing, water skiing in summer and ice fishing, skating and snowmobiling during the winter months. Wild Rapids Waterslides, formerly one of the largest waterslide parks in Alberta, was located on the shore of the lake within the Town of Sylvan Lake, but has ceased operations as of 2016.

Sylvan Lake Park and Jarvis Bay Provincial Park are established on the southern and eastern shores.

In 1908, smallmouth bass were stocked in the lake as part of an effort to introduce sport-fishing species into Alberta lakes.

== See also ==
- Lakes of Alberta
