= Hawk Hills, Alberta (designated place) =

Hawk Hills Balmoral NW
- Designated place
- Location of Hawk Hills Hawk Hills (Canada)
- Coordinates: 52.283°N 113.714°W
- Country: Canada
- Province: Alberta
- Region: Central Alberta
- Census division: 8
- Municipal district: Red Deer County

Government
  - Type: Unincorporated
  - Governing body: Red Deer County Council

Area (2021)
  - Land: 0.26 km^{2} (0.10 sq mi)

Population (2021)
  - Total: 52
  - Density: 197.6/km^{2} (512/sq mi)
- Time zone: UTC−06:00 (Alberta Time)
- Area codes: 403, 587, 825

Hawk Hills is an unincorporated community in Alberta, Canada within Red Deer County that is recognized as a designated place by Statistics Canada. It is located on the east side of Range Road 270, 0.8 km (0.50 mi) north of Highway 11. Prior to the 2021 census, Statistics Canada referred to Hawk Hills as Balmoral NW.

== Demographics ==
In the 2021 Census of Population conducted by Statistics Canada, Hawk Hills had a population of 52 living in 13 of its 13 total private dwellings, a change of 23.8% from its 2016 population of 42. With a land area of 0.26 km^{2} (0.10 sq mi), it had a population density of 200.0/km^{2} (518.0/sq mi) in 2021.

== See also ==
- List of communities in Alberta
- List of designated places in Alberta
