= Springbrook, Alberta =

Springbrook
- Hamlet
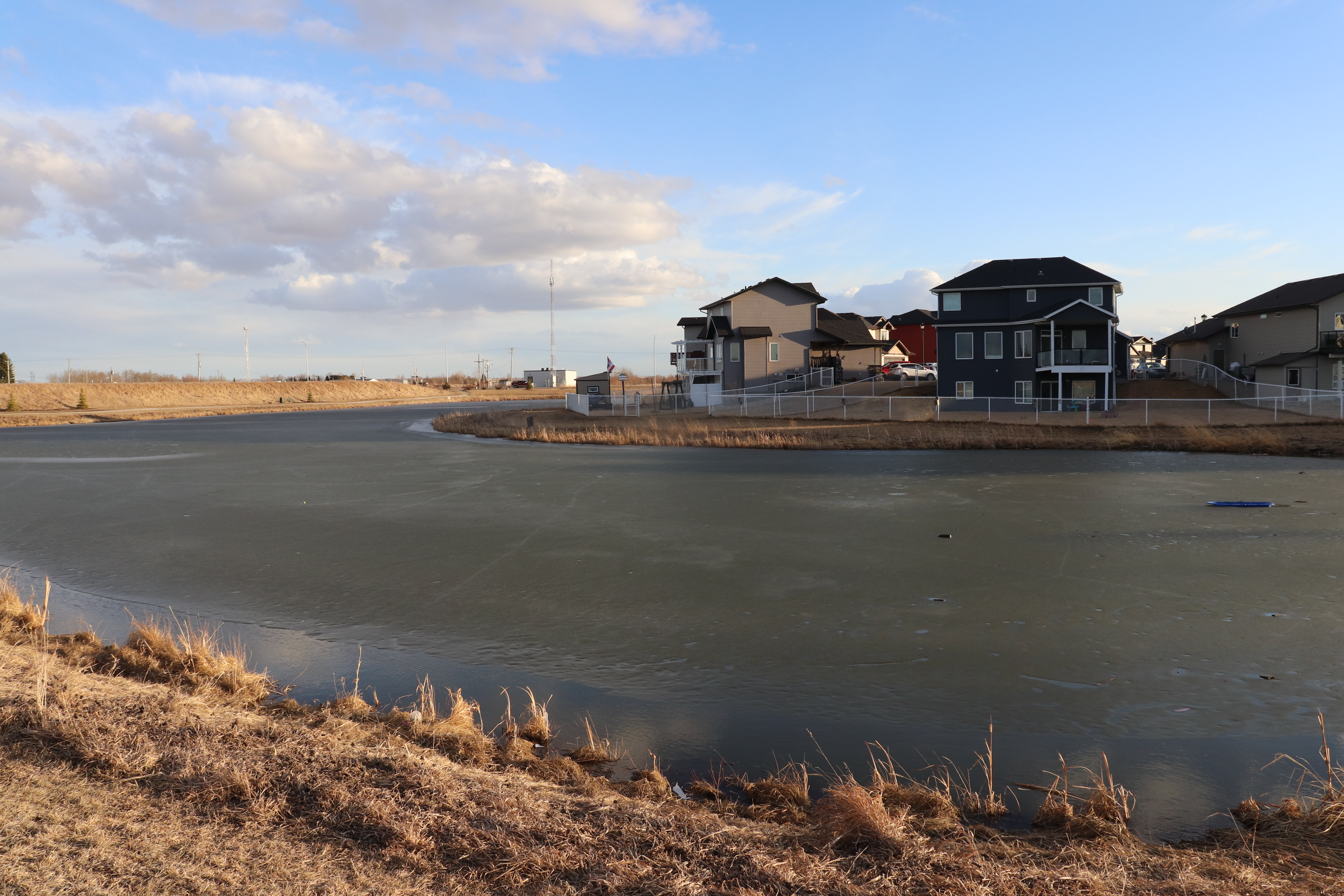
- Springbrook, Alberta

- Location of Springbrook Springbrook (Canada)
- Coordinates: 52°10′35″N 113°52′35″W
- Country: Canada
- Province: Alberta
- Region: Central Alberta
- Census division: 8
- Municipal district: Red Deer County

Government
  - Type: Unincorporated
  - Governing body: Red Deer County Council

Area (2021)
  - Land: 5.26 km^{2} (2.03 sq mi)

Population (2021)
  - Total: 1,534
  - Density: 291.6/km^{2} (755/sq mi)
- Time zone: UTC−06:00 (Alberta Time)
- Area codes: 403, 587, 825

Springbrook is a hamlet in central Alberta, Canada within Red Deer County. It is located 1 kilometre (0.62 mi) west of Highway 2A, approximately 11 kilometres (6.8 mi) southwest of Red Deer, and approximately 6 kilometres (3.7 mi) north of Penhold. Springbrook is also recognized by Statistics Canada as a designated place.

Springbrook was home of the Penhold Air Cadet Summer Training Centre (PACSTC). The PACSTC was formerly RCAF Station Penhold.

== Demographics ==
Population history of Springbrook
Year	Pop.	±%
2006	956	—
2011	1,079	+12.9%
2016	1,507	+39.7%
2021	1,534	+1.8%
Source: Statistics Canada

In the 2021 Census of Population conducted by Statistics Canada, Springbrook had a population of 1,534 living in 579 of its 605 total private dwellings, a change of 1.8% from its 2016 population of 1,507. With a land area of 5.26 km^{2} (2.03 sq mi), it had a population density of 291.6/km^{2} (755.3/sq mi) in 2021.

As a designated place in the 2016 Census of Population conducted by Statistics Canada, Springbrook had a population of 1,507 living in 532 of its 552 total private dwellings, a change of 39.7% from its 2011 population of 1,079. With a land area of 5.26 km^{2} (2.03 sq mi), it had a population density of 286.5/km^{2} (742.0/sq mi) in 2016.

== See also ==
- List of communities in Alberta
- List of designated places in Alberta
- List of hamlets in Alberta
