= Sylvan Lake, Alberta =

Town in Canada

Sylvan Lake
- Town
- Town of Sylvan Lake
- Aerial view (2026)

- Location of Sylvan Lake in Alberta Sylvan Lake (Canada)
- Coordinates: 52°18′30″N 114°05′47″W
- Country: Canada
- Province: Alberta
- Region: Central Alberta
- Census division: 8
- Municipal district: Red Deer County
- Founded: 1898
- Incorporated
  - Village: December 30, 1912
  - Town: May 20, 1946

Government
  - Mayor: Megan Hanson
  - Governing body: Sylvan Lake Town Council: Kjeryn Dakin; Teresa Rilling; Graham Parsons; Jas Payne; Tim Mearns; Ian Oostindie
  - CAO: Sean Durkin
  - MP: Blaine Calkins
  - MLA: Devin Dreeshen

Area (2021)
  - Land: 23.09 km^{2} (8.92 sq mi)
- Elevation: 945 m (3,100 ft)

Population (2021)
  - Total: 15,995
  - Density: 692.8/km^{2} (1,794/sq mi)
  - Municipal census (2015): 14,310
  - Estimate (2020): 16,351
- Time zone: UTC−06:00 (Alberta Time)
- Forward sortation area: T4S
- Area codes: 403, 587, 825
- Waterways: Sylvan Lake
- Highways: Highway 11; Highway 11A; Highway 20
- Website: sylvanlake.ca

Sylvan Lake is a town in central Alberta, Canada. It is located approximately 25 kilometres (16 mi) west of the City of Red Deer along Highway 11 or Highway 11A. It is on the southeast edge of Sylvan Lake, a 15-kilometre-long (9.3 mi) freshwater lake that straddles the boundary between Red Deer County and Lacombe County.

The lake is a popular destination for tourists from around Alberta, with around 1 million visitors each year. Popular tourist activities include sunbathing, swimming, water-skiing, and visiting Camp Woods. Camp Woods in Sylvan Lake hosted the 12th Canadian Scout Jamboree in July 2013.

== History ==
The land that would later become the town was ceded to the Crown by the First Nations with Treaty 6 in 1877.

Sylvan Lake was originally settled by French-speaking immigrants from Quebec and the United States. Arriving in 1898 from Michigan, Alexandre Loiselle and his family homesteaded the quarter section that later became the west side of today's Main (50th) Street and the businesses and homes immediately to the west. When the first settlers arrived at Sylvan Lake in 1899, the lake was named Snake Lake from the Cree name kinepik (ᑭᓀᐱᐠ) which referred to the numerous garter snakes in the area. The name was officially changed to Sylvan Lake in 1903. "Sylvan" is from the Latin sylvanus, which means "of a forest". Palliser's map of 1859 gives the name Swan Lake for the location.

In 1906, an additional group of French settlers under the leadership of Dr. Adalbert Alexi Cornil Tanche attempted to found a socialist colony based on the ideas of Charles Fourier. The utopian community dissolved, however, by 1908 due to poor preparation and the loss of a key lumber contract.

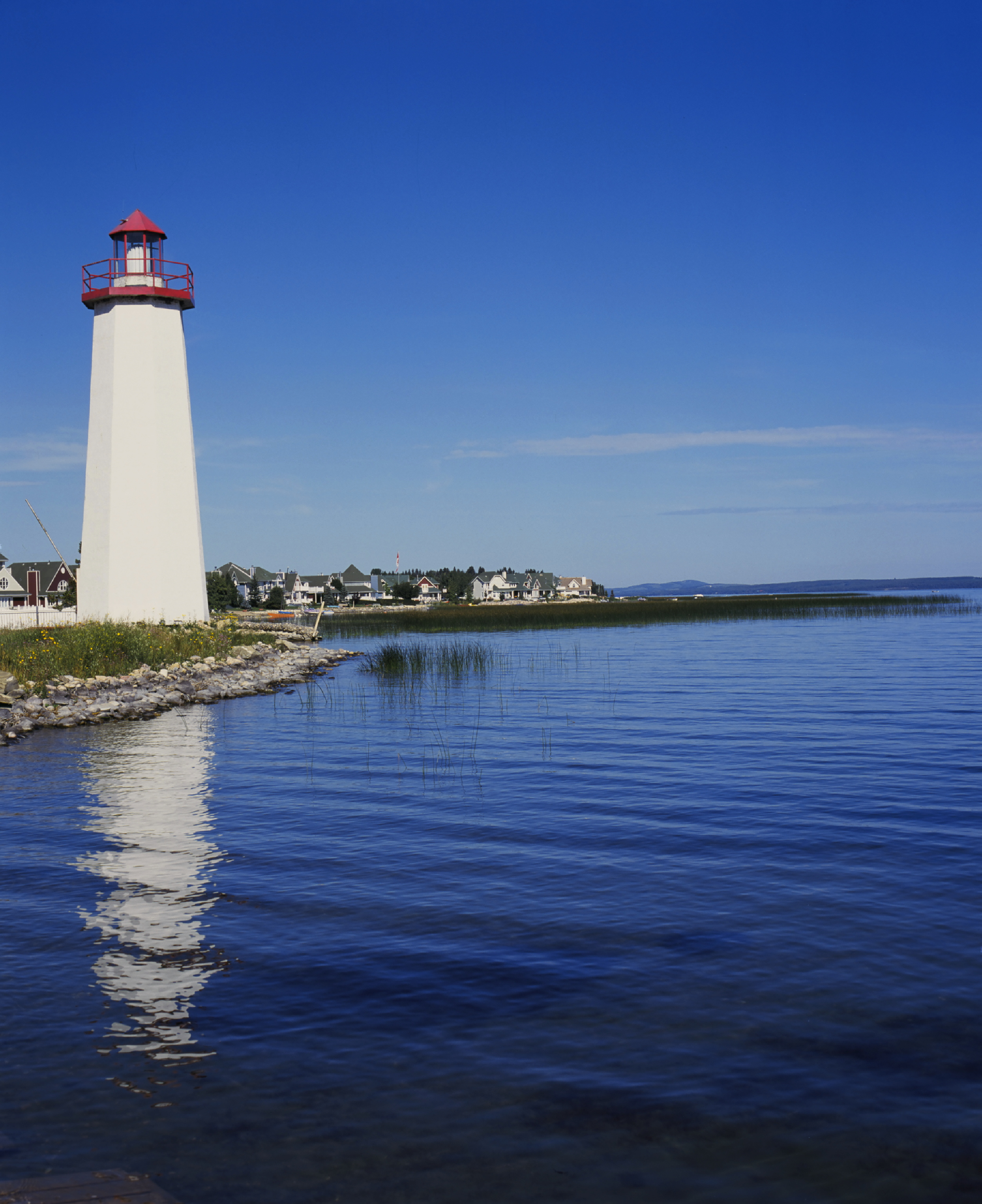
Sylvan Lake Lighthouse

In the early twentieth century, groups of Estonian and then Finnish settlers moved to homesteads to the south and west of the fledgling settlement at Sylvan Lake. With their arrival came the early business community, a general store, a blacksmith, a hardware store, post office, barber, and restaurants. The completion of the Canadian Northern line to Rocky Mountain House and Nordegg in 1912 and the parallel Canadian Pacific in 1914 opened the west country to settlement and resulted in the incorporation of Sylvan Lake in 1913 under Mayor E. S. Grimson, a local hardware store owner. The anniversary of the founding of the town is celebrated every year in Sylvan Lake as "1913 Days".

Farming quickly became a mainstay in the area and in 1923 an Alberta Pacific Grain Company grain elevator was built on the CPR line immediately north of what is now Cottonwood Estates. The elevator was torn down in the 1970s and the CPR line was abandoned in 1983 and removed in 1986. Since then, the right of way has survived as a natural area and walking path through Sylvan Lake.

Elevators were also constructed along the CN line and were used by local farmers in the mid-century decades. They were torn down in the late 1990s.

Even prior to the building of the railways, Sylvan Lake was becoming a summer resort for families in Red Deer. With the coming of the trains, "the Lake" became a favourite of families from both Edmonton and Calgary. The summer visitors camped in tents, but soon the "Cottage Area" east of 46 Street and in "Lower Camp" on the southeast shore began to fill with summer cottages. In the 1930s and 1940s people began arriving by car and the areas around Norglenwold, Sylvan Lake Provincial Park and Jarvis Bay Provincial Park began to fill up with summer visitors.

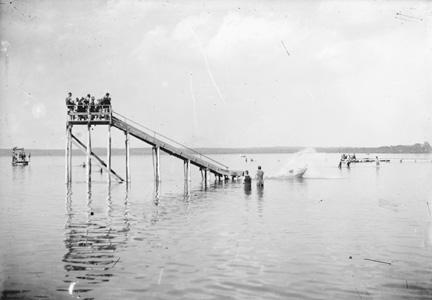
Bathers at Water Slides, Sylvan Lake, Alberta, (1906-1928)

The influx of summer residents and visitors also brought businesses and services that catered to the ever-increasing number of tourists. In 1913, the first motor launch took paying passengers on tours around the lake. A large waterslide was also erected near the lakeshore. A large boathouse was constructed in 1926, allowing visitors to rent a boat, canoe, swimsuit, or buy ice cream, pop and other items necessary to a summer day at the lake. Regattas were held on the lake for a number of years beginning in 1923.

In 1928, the Dominion Government, assisted by the Sylvan Lake Women's Institute (WI), built the long pier that jutted out into the lake from the bottom of Main Street. This pier was connected to the earlier WI Pier and formed a square area used for swimming and mooring boats. The first "waterslide" at Sylvan Lake was part of this facility. The piers were prone to ice damage over the winter and were replaced by the existing "landfill" that now hosts beach volleyball tournaments, dragon boat racing and the lake tour on the "Zoo Cruise".

In 1983, the original waterslide was replaced by the Wild Rapids Waterslides, which was the largest facility of its kind in western Canada until its closure in 2016.

Another byproduct of losing the piers and later the government boat launch was the construction of the Sylvan Lake Marina, home of many of the permanent boats on the lake, boating facilities, and the Sylvan Lake lighthouse.

In 2014, Sylvan Lake won the Kraft Hockeyville contest, which included a large cash prize and the rights to host an NHL pre-season game between the Calgary Flames and the Arizona Coyotes.

== Geography ==
The Town of Sylvan Lake is located on the southeast shore of Sylvan Lake. The summer villages of Norglenwold and Jarvis Bay border the town to the northwest and northeast respectively.

=== Climate ===
Sylvan Lake has a subarctic climate (Dfc) with long, cold winters and short, mild summers.

Climate data for Sylvan Lake, Alberta
| Month | Jan | Feb | Mar | Apr | May | Jun | Jul | Aug | Sep | Oct | Nov | Dec | Year |
|---|---|---|---|---|---|---|---|---|---|---|---|---|---|
| Record high °C (°F) | 13.3 (55.9) | 14.8 (58.6) | 15.4 (59.7) | 28.6 (83.5) | 32.5 (90.5) | 33.3 (91.9) | 32.2 (90.0) | 31.8 (89.2) | 29.6 (85.3) | 28.1 (82.6) | 19.1 (66.4) | 12.7 (54.9) | 33.3 (91.9) |
| Mean daily maximum °C (°F) | −9.5 (14.9) | −6.4 (20.5) | 0.7 (33.3) | 9.3 (48.7) | 15.9 (60.6) | 19.5 (67.1) | 21.3 (70.3) | 20.1 (68.2) | 14.8 (58.6) | 9.2 (48.6) | −2.1 (28.2) | −8.7 (16.3) | 7.0 (44.6) |
| Daily mean °C (°F) | −14.6 (5.7) | −11.8 (10.8) | −5.1 (22.8) | 3.1 (37.6) | 9.5 (49.1) | 13.7 (56.7) | 15.7 (60.3) | 14.4 (57.9) | 9.2 (48.6) | 3.9 (39.0) | −6.4 (20.5) | −13.4 (7.9) | 1.5 (34.7) |
| Mean daily minimum °C (°F) | −19.8 (−3.6) | −17.6 (0.3) | −11 (12) | −3.1 (26.4) | 3.1 (37.6) | 7.8 (46.0) | 10.0 (50.0) | 8.6 (47.5) | 3.6 (38.5) | −1.4 (29.5) | −10.9 (12.4) | −18.2 (−0.8) | −4.1 (24.6) |
| Record low °C (°F) | −42.8 (−45.0) | −40.0 (−40.0) | −38.3 (−36.9) | −26.1 (−15.0) | −7.2 (19.0) | −2.7 (27.1) | 3.1 (37.6) | −2.1 (28.2) | −7.8 (18.0) | −21.8 (−7.2) | −36.1 (−33.0) | −41.7 (−43.1) | −42.8 (−45.0) |
| Average precipitation mm (inches) | 25.8 (1.02) | 20.7 (0.81) | 25.5 (1.00) | 29.0 (1.14) | 67.0 (2.64) | 91.6 (3.61) | 97.2 (3.83) | 73.7 (2.90) | 55.9 (2.20) | 24.2 (0.95) | 21.3 (0.84) | 24.5 (0.96) | 556.0 (21.89) |
Source 1: 1961-1990 Environment Canada
Source 2: 1971-2000 Environment Canada Precipitation Only

Seasonal mean temperatures:

- Winter −14.6 °C (5.72 °F)
- Spring 3.1 °C (37.58 °F)
- Summer 15.7 °C (60.26 °F)
- Fall 3.9 °C (39.02 °F)

Annual precipitation:

- Rain: 398.3 millimetres (15.68 in)
- Snow: 158.2 centimetres (62.28 in)
- Total: 556.4 millimetres (21.91 in)

Average hours of sunshine: 2,125 hours

== Demographics ==
Federal census population history
| Year | Pop. | ±% |
|---|---|---|
| 1916 | 115 | — |
| 1921 | 180 | +56.5% |
| 1926 | 295 | +63.9% |
| 1931 | 416 | +41.0% |
| 1936 | 652 | +56.7% |
| 1941 | 805 | +23.5% |
| 1946 | 971 | +20.6% |
| 1951 | 985 | +1.4% |
| 1956 | 1,114 | +13.1% |
| 1961 | 1,381 | +24.0% |
| 1966 | 1,332 | −3.5% |
| 1971 | 1,597 | +19.9% |
| 1976 | 1,837 | +15.0% |
| 1981 | 3,779 | +105.7% |
| 1986 | 3,937 | +4.2% |
| 1991 | 4,197 | +6.6% |
| 1996 | 5,178 | +23.4% |
| 2001 | 7,493 | +44.7% |
| 2006 | 10,208 | +36.2% |
| 2011 | 12,327 | +20.8% |
| 2016 | 14,816 | +20.2% |
| 2021 | 15,995 | +8.0% |
Source: Statistics Canada

In the 2021 Census of Population conducted by Statistics Canada, the Town of Sylvan Lake had a population of 15,995 living in 6,396 of its 7,141 total private dwellings, a change of 8% from its 2016 population of 14,816. With a land area of 23.09 km^{2} (8.92 sq mi), it had a population density of 692.7/km^{2} (1,794.1/sq mi) in 2021.

In the 2016 Census of Population conducted by Statistics Canada, the Town of Sylvan Lake recorded a population of 14,816 living in 5,616 of its 6,567 total private dwellings, a 19.9% change from its 2011 population of 12,362. With a land area of 23.36 km^{2} (9.02 sq mi), it had a population density of 634.2/km^{2} (1,642.7/sq mi) in 2016.

The population of the Town of Sylvan Lake according to its 2015 municipal census is 14,310, a 10% change from its 2013 municipal census population of 13,015.

=== Ethnicity ===
Panethnic groups in the Town of Sylvan Lake (2001−2021)
| Panethnic group | 2021 | | 2016 | | 2011 | | 2006 | | 2001 | |
| Panethnic group | Pop. | % | Pop. | % | Pop. | % | Pop. | % | Pop. | % |
|---|---|---|---|---|---|---|---|---|---|---|
| European (Note: Statistic includes all persons that did not make up part of a visible minority or an indigenous identity.) | 13,800 | 86.49% | 13,220 | 90.18% | 11,270 | 92.19% | 9,460 | 93.8% | 7,010 | 94.16% |
| Indigenous | 1,295 | 8.12% | 895 | 6.11% | 610 | 4.99% | 500 | 4.96% | 330 | 4.43% |
| Southeast Asian (Note: Statistic includes total responses of "Filipino" and "Southeast Asian" under visible minority section on census.) | 360 | 2.26% | 120 | 0.82% | 155 | 1.27% | 10 | 0.1% | 10 | 0.13% |
| East Asian (Note: Statistic includes total responses of "Chinese", "Korean", and "Japanese" under visible minority section on census.) | 155 | 0.97% | 125 | 0.85% | 15 | 0.12% | 45 | 0.45% | 60 | 0.81% |
| African | 115 | 0.72% | 125 | 0.85% | 35 | 0.29% | 0 | 0% | 20 | 0.27% |
| Latin American | 95 | 0.6% | 60 | 0.41% | 85 | 0.7% | 35 | 0.35% | 10 | 0.13% |
| South Asian | 85 | 0.53% | 60 | 0.41% | 0 | 0% | 30 | 0.3% | 0 | 0% |
| Middle Eastern (Note: Statistic includes total responses of "West Asian" and "Arab" under visible minority section on census.) | 20 | 0.13% | 15 | 0.1% | 0 | 0% | 0 | 0% | 10 | 0.13% |
| Other/multiracial (Note: Statistic includes total responses of "Visible minority, n.i.e." and "Multiple visible minorities" under visible minority section on census.) | 35 | 0.22% | 35 | 0.24% | 0 | 0% | 0 | 0% | 10 | 0.13% |
| Total responses | 15,955 | 99.75% | 14,660 | 98.95% | 12,225 | 98.89% | 10,085 | 98.8% | 7,445 | 99.23% |
| Total population | 15,995 | 100% | 14,816 | 100% | 12,362 | 100% | 10,208 | 100% | 7,503 | 100% |
Note: Totals greater than 100% due to multiple origin responses

=== Religion ===
Religion

- Protestant: 2,805 or 37.6%
- Catholic: 1,815 or 24.4%
- Other Christian: 380 or 5.1%
- Buddhist: 25 or 0.3%
- Eastern religions: 10 or 0.1%
- Other: 1 or 0.01%
- No religion: 2,410 or 32.4%

== Government ==
Federal

Sylvan Lake is within the Red Deer—Lacombe federal electoral district. It is represented by Blaine Calkins of the Conservative Party.

Provincial

Sylvan Lake is within the Innisfail-Sylvan Lake provincial electoral district. It is represented by Devin Dreeshen of the United Conservative Party.

Municipal

Sylvan Lake Town Council consists of one Mayor and six Councillors that are elected every four years. The current mayor is Megan Hanson, who was first elected as a Councillor in 2013 and as mayor in the 2021 municipal election. Councillors elected in the 2021 municipal election were Kjeryn Dakin, Jas Payne, Teresa Rilling, Tim Mearns, Graham Parsons, and Kendall Kloss. Ian Oostindie was elected in a by-election when Kendall Kloss resigned his seat in 2022.

== Education ==
The town has six public schools in the Chinook's Edge School District.

- Beacon Hill Elementary School
- C. P. Blakely School
- Fox Run School
- H.J. Cody School
- Steffie Woima Elementary School
- Sylvan Lake Career High

Two Catholic Schools in the Red Deer Catholic Regional Schools Division.

- École Mother Teresa Catholic School
- Our Lady of the Rosary

Also, Lighthouse Christian Academy and Sylvan Meadows Adventist School are two private schools that operate in Sylvan Lake.

== Media ==
Sylvan Lake is served by one local newspaper, The Sylvan Lake News.

== Sports ==
The Sylvan Lake Gulls of the Western Canadian Baseball League play at Pogadl Park.

The Sylvan Lake Wranglers of the Heritage Junior Hockey League play at the NexSource Centre.

== See also ==
- List of communities in Alberta
- List of towns in Alberta
