= Ardley, Alberta =

Ardley
- Hamlet
- Location of Ardley Ardley (Canada)
- Coordinates: 52°15′41″N 113°13′39″W
- Country: Canada
- Province: Alberta
- Region: Central Alberta
- Census division: 8
- Municipal district: Red Deer County

Government
  - Type: Unincorporated
  - Governing body: Red Deer County Council

Population (1991)
  - Total: 17
- Time zone: UTC−06:00 (Alberta Time)
- Area codes: 403, 587, 825

Ardley is a hamlet in central Alberta, Canada within Red Deer County. It is located 3 kilometres (1.9 mi) west of Highway 21, approximately 40 kilometres (25 mi) east of Red Deer.

== Toponymy ==
Ardley is named after a village of the same name in Oxfordshire, England. The meaning of the word ardley itself is "high pasture."

== History ==
=== Pre-settlement ===
During the Palliser Expedition, a survey of Western Canada conducted between 1857 and 1860, expedition member James Hector recorded that a stream north of Ardley boasted exposed coal deposits that had been ignited. His Indigenous guides reported that the fire had been burning "for as long as they and their fathers could remember."

=== Coal Banks: 1901-1912 ===
Settlers first arrived in Ardley around 1901, which area was initially known as Coal Banks due to its proximity to coal mines. In 1903, a school, Mound Lake School, opened in Coal Banks. Its first teacher was Annie Gaetz, who later published a local history of Red Deer and surrounding areas in 1948.

A post office began operating with the name Coal Banks in 1904. Christian residents began running a Sunday School in the area within the decade; by 1908, they had built a place of worship.

=== Ardley: 1912-present ===
The Grand Trunk Pacific Railway built a line through the settlement in 1912, and named its station Ardley after a place in England. The Coal Banks post office and school subsequently changed names to Ardley. A bridge over the Red Deer River was also installed by Grand Trunk Pacific.

Mound Lake School consolidated with the Great Bend School District in 1919. Also that year, the Canadian National Railway assumed control of Ardley's railway operations. A grain elevator began operating in Ardley in the mid-1920s.

After Ardley's church in Ardley burned down in 1943, parishioners relocated to a site nearer Delburne. The hamlet's name was approved for federal mapping purposes in 1951. The Ardley Bridge was damaged by heavy rain in 1952, and closed for business until repairs were completed in 1955.

A fire destroyed Ardley's post office in July 1961. Its closure became permanent after no residents expressed interest in rebuilding or assuming control of postal operations.

As of 2022, Ardley Bridge remains in use for rail services. Ardley's population stands at 10 as of 2025.

== Ardley Dam project ==
In 1914, William Pearce devised a hydraulic engineering plan for the purposes of diverting water from the Red Deer River to local farms.

Pearce's proposal, though not acted upon at the time, evolved into a proposal for an Ardley dam during the 1940s. A cost estimate was prepared in 1951, followed by further site studies in 1960s. The slow-moving project was paused in 1983, owing to the construction of the Dickson Dam upstream.

In 2024, the Government of Alberta issued a request for proposals for a feasibility study regarding the construction of an Ardley dam.

== Demographics ==
Ardley recorded a population of 17 in the 1991 Census of Population conducted by Statistics Canada.

As of August 2025, Red Deer County reports that Ardley has a population of 10. It has been described as a ghost town as recently as 2017.

== Notable people ==
- Helen Nicol – Canadian-American baseball pitcher who played in the All-American Girls Professional Baseball League between 1943 and 1952.

== See also ==
- List of communities in Alberta
- List of hamlets in Alberta
