= Herder, Alberta =

Herder
- Designated place
- Location of Herder Herder (Canada)
- Coordinates: 52.271°N 113.713°W
- Country: Canada
- Province: Alberta
- Region: Central Alberta
- Census division: 8
- Municipal district: Red Deer County

Government
  - Type: Unincorporated
  - Governing body: Red Deer County Council

Area (2021)
  - Land: 0.57 km^{2} (0.22 sq mi)

Population (2021)
  - Total: 78
  - Density: 137.4/km^{2} (356/sq mi)
- Time zone: UTC−06:00 (Alberta Time)
- Area codes: 403, 587, 825

Herder is an unincorporated community in Alberta, Canada, within Red Deer County that is recognized as a designated place by Statistics Canada. It is located on the south side of Highway 11, 1.8 km (1.1 mi) east of Red Deer. It is adjacent to the designated place of Balmoral SE to the northeast.

== Demographics ==
In the 2021 Census of Population conducted by Statistics Canada, Herder had a population of 78 living in 23 of its 25 total private dwellings, a change of 20% from its 2016 population of 65. With a land area of 0.57 km^{2} (0.22 sq mi), it had a population density of 136.8/km^{2} (354.4/sq mi) in 2021.

As a designated place in the 2016 Census of Population conducted by Statistics Canada, Herder had a population of 65 living in 17 of its 18 total private dwellings, a change of 18.2% from its 2011 population of 55. With a land area of 0.57 km^{2} (0.22 sq mi), it had a population density of 114.0/km^{2} (295.3/sq mi) in 2016.

== See also ==
- List of communities in Alberta
- List of designated places in Alberta
