= Spruce Lane Acres, Alberta =

Spruce Lane Acres
- Designated place
- Location of Spruce Lane Acres Spruce Lane Acres (Canada)
- Coordinates: 52.350°N 113.812°W
- Country: Canada
- Province: Alberta
- Region: Central Alberta
- Census division: 8
- Municipal district: Red Deer County

Government
  - Type: Unincorporated
  - Governing body: Red Deer County Council

Area (2021)
  - Land: 0.37 km^{2} (0.14 sq mi)

Population (2021)
  - Total: 92
  - Density: 248.9/km^{2} (645/sq mi)
- Time zone: UTC−06:00 (Alberta Time)
- Area codes: 403, 587, 825

Spruce Lane Acres is an unincorporated community in Alberta, Canada within Red Deer County that is recognized as a designated place by Statistics Canada. It is located on the north side of Township Road 392, 1.8 km (1.1 mi) east of Highway 2.

== Demographics ==
In the 2021 Census of Population conducted by Statistics Canada, Spruce Lane Acres had a population of 92 living in 37 of its 40 total private dwellings, a change of −8% from its 2016 population of 100. With a land area of 0.37 km^{2} (0.14 sq mi), it had a population density of 248.6/km^{2} (644.0/sq mi) in 2021.

As a designated place in the 2016 Census of Population conducted by Statistics Canada, Spruce Lane Acres had a population of 100 living in 36 of its 36 total private dwellings, a change of −1% from its 2011 population of 101. With a land area of 0.37 km^{2} (0.14 sq mi), it had a population density of 270.3/km^{2} (700.0/sq mi) in 2016.

== See also ==
- List of communities in Alberta
- List of designated places in Alberta
