= Half Moon Bay, Alberta =

Half Moon Bay
- Summer village
- Summer Village of Half Moon Bay
- Location of Half Moon Bay in Alberta
- Coordinates: 52.34779°N 114.17786°W
- Country: Canada
- Province: Alberta
- Census division: No. 8

Government
  - Type: Municipal incorporation
  - Mayor: Jon Johnston
  - Governing body: Half Moon Bay Summer Village Council

Area (2021)
  - Land: 0.12 km^{2} (0.046 sq mi)

Population (2021)
  - Total: 65
  - Density: 552.7/km^{2} (1,431/sq mi)
- Time zone: UTC−06:00 (Alberta Time)
- Website: Official website

Half Moon Bay is a summer village in Alberta, Canada. It is located on the western shore of Sylvan Lake, near Sylvan Lake Provincial Park.

== Demographics ==
In the 2021 Census of Population conducted by Statistics Canada, the Summer Village of Half Moon Bay had a population of 65 living in 26 of its 63 total private dwellings, a change of 54.8% from its 2016 population of 42. With a land area of 0.12 km^{2} (0.046 sq mi), it had a population density of 541.7/km^{2} (1,402.9/sq mi) in 2021.

In the 2016 Census of Population conducted by Statistics Canada, the Summer Village of Half Moon Bay had a population of 42 living in 20 of its 56 total private dwellings, a 10.5% change from its 2011 population of 38. With a land area of 0.11 km^{2} (0.042 sq mi), it had a population density of 381.8/km^{2} (988.9/sq mi) in 2016.

== See also ==
- List of communities in Alberta
- List of summer villages in Alberta
- List of resort villages in Saskatchewan
