= Red Deer County =

Municipal district in Alberta, Canada

- Municipal district
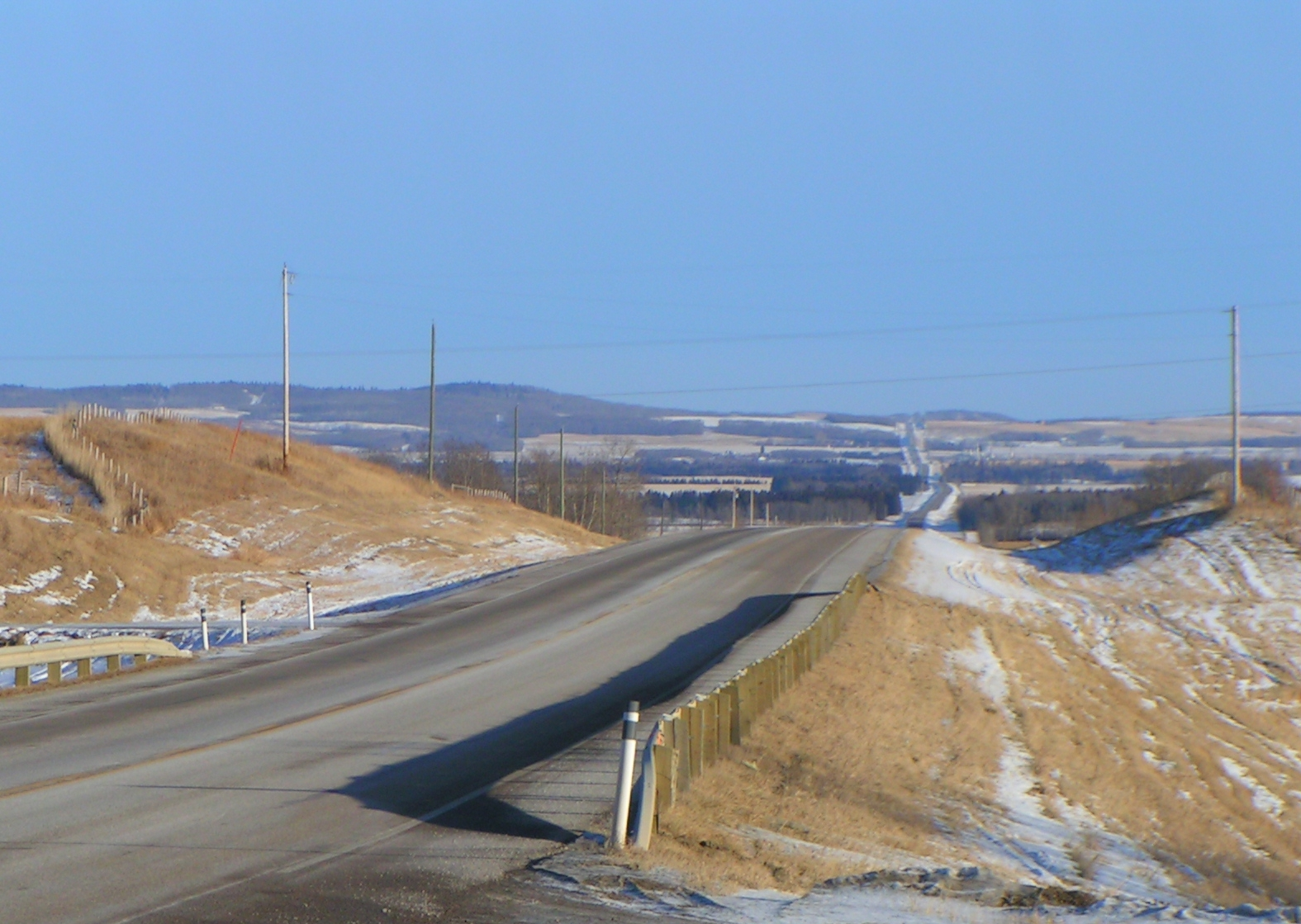
- Highway 11 passing through ranch land and aspen parkland in Red Deer County

- Flag Coat of arms Heraldic badge

- Location within Alberta
- Coordinates: 52°16′5″N 113°48′40″W
- Country: Canada
- Province: Alberta
- Region: Central Alberta
- Census division: 8
- Established: 1944
- Incorporated: 1963

Government
  - Mayor: Brent Ramsay
  - Governing body: Red Deer County Council: Lee Girard; Kelli Ritz; Dana Depalme; Julie Brewster; Carly Anna Hansen; Ryanna Hansen
  - Manager: Curtis Herzberg
  - MP: Blaine Calkins, Burton Bailey
  - Administrative office: west of Red Deer

Area (2021)
  - Land: 3,919.25 km^{2} (1,513.23 sq mi)

Population (2021)
  - Total: 19,933
  - Density: 5.1/km^{2} (13/sq mi)
- Time zone: UTC−06:00 (Alberta Time)
- Forward sortation area: T4E
- Website: rdcounty.ca

Red Deer County is a municipal district in central Alberta, Canada within Census Division No. 8 and surrounding the City of Red Deer. The neighbouring municipalities of Red Deer County are Clearwater County to the west, Lacombe County to the north, the County of Stettler No. 6 to the east, Kneehill County to the southeast and Mountain View County to the south. It is located approximately midway between Edmonton and Calgary, bisected by the Queen Elizabeth II Highway and bounded on the north and east by the Red Deer River.

== Geography ==
=== Communities and localities ===
The following urban municipalities are surrounded by Red Deer County.

Cities

- Red Deer

Towns

- Bowden
- Innisfail
- Penhold
- Sylvan Lake

Villages

- Delburne
- Elnora

Summer Villages

- Jarvis Bay
- Norglenwold

The following hamlets are located within Red Deer County.

Hamlets

- Ardley
- Benalto
- Dickson
- Gasoline Alley
- Linn Valley
- Lousana
- Markerville
- Springbrook
- Spruce View

The following localities are located within Red Deer County.

- Balmoral
  - Hawk Hills (designated place)
  - Balmoral Heights (designated place)
- Bouteiller Subdivision or Boutellier Subdivision
- Briggs
- Broderson Subdivision or Brodersons Subdivision
- Brownlee Acreage
- Burnt Lake
- Canyon Heights (designated place)
- Central Park (designated place)
- Coalbanks
- Cygnet
- Doan
- Elspeth
- Evarts
- Fleming
- Garrington
- Garrington Acres
- Gleniffer
- Green Ridge Park
- Half Moon Bay
- Harrison
- Henday
- Herder (designated place)
- High Ridge Properties
- Hillsdown
- Horseshoe Lake
- Kevisville
- Knee Hill Valley
- Kountry Meadows (designated place) or Kountry Meadow Estates
- Kuusamo
- Les Trailer Park (designated place)
- McKenzie Subdivision
- Melody Meadows Trailer Park
- Milnerton
- Mintlaw
- Mountain House
- New Hill
- Niobe
- Nisbet
- Pine Lake
- Poplar Ridge or Poplar Ridge Subdivision
- Prevo
- Raven
- Red Deer Junction
- Ridgewood Terrace
- Riverview Park
- Shady Pine Trailer Park
- South Park Village
- Spruce Lane Acres (designated place)
- Trueman Subdivision
- Tuttle
- West Ridge Estates
- Wild Rose
- Woodland Hills (designated place)

Business Parks

The following are business parks located within Red Deer County:

- Belich Business Park
- Blindman Industrial Park
- Burnt Lake Business Park
- Clearview Industrial Park
- Energy Business Park
- Gasoline Alley Business Park
- Kuusomo Industrial Park
- McKenzie Industrial Business Park
- Petrolia Business Park
- Piper Creek Business Park
- Red Deer Industrial Park

== Demographics ==
In the 2021 Census of Population conducted by Statistics Canada, Red Deer County had a population of 19,933 living in 7,430 of its 8,674 total private dwellings, a change of 2.1% from its 2016 population of 19,531. With a land area of 3,919.25 km^{2} (1,513.23 sq mi), it had a population density of 5.1/km^{2} (13.2/sq mi) in 2021.

In the 2016 Census of Population conducted by Statistics Canada, Red Deer County had a population of 19,541 living in 7,097 of its 8,440 total private dwellings, a 6.7% change from its 2011 population of 18,316. With a land area of 3,961.85 km^{2} (1,529.68 sq mi), it had a population density of 4.9/km^{2} (12.8/sq mi) in 2016.

== Economy ==
Agriculture plays a role in Red Deer County's economy including livestock and crop production. Red Deer County has dairies that make cheese, U-pick vegetable and fruit farms, and the largest organic farm in Alberta. It also has elk, deer, and apiary farms as well as a mouse farm, which raises white mice for the pet food industry. Lumber and mineral resources are also present in Red Deer County.

Per the Canadian government in 2026, the key economic sectors in Red Deer include health care and social assistance, retail trade, and construction.

== See also ==
- List of communities in Alberta
- List of municipal districts in Alberta
