= Central Park, Alberta =

Central Park
- Designated place
- Location of Central Park Central Park (Canada)
- Coordinates: 52.331°N 113.823°W
- Country: Canada
- Province: Alberta
- Region: Central Alberta
- Census division: 8
- Municipal district: Red Deer County

Government
  - Type: Unincorporated
  - Governing body: Red Deer County Council

Area
  - Land: 0.17 km^{2} (0.066 sq mi)

Population (2016)
  - Total: 80
- Time zone: UTC−06:00 (Alberta Time)
- Area codes: 403, 587, 825

Central Park is an unincorporated community in Alberta, Canada within Red Deer County that is recognized as a designated place by Statistics Canada. It is located on the south side of Township Road 391, 1.0 km (0.62 mi) west of Highway 2A.

== Demographics ==
As a designated place in the 2016 Census of Population conducted by Statistics Canada, Central Park recorded a population of 80 living in 27 of its 28 total private dwellings, a change of 1.3% from its 2011 population of 79. With a land area of 0.17 km^{2} (0.066 sq mi), it had a population density of 470.6/km^{2} (1,218.8/sq mi) in 2016.

As a designated place in the 2011 Census, Central Park had a population of 79 living in 28 of its 28 total dwellings, a -7.1% change from its 2006 population of 85. With a land area of 0.17 km^{2} (0.066 sq mi), it had a population density of 465/km^{2} (1,200/sq mi) in 2011.

== See also ==
- List of communities in Alberta
