= Linn Valley, Alberta =

Linn Valley
- Hamlet
- Location of Linn Valley Linn Valley (Canada)
- Coordinates: 52°19′20″N 113°52′26″W
- Country: Canada
- Province: Alberta
- Region: Central Alberta
- Census division: 8
- Municipal district: Red Deer County

Government
  - Type: Unincorporated
  - Governing body: Red Deer County Council

Area (2021)
  - Land: 0.67 km^{2} (0.26 sq mi)

Population (2021)
  - Total: 218
  - Density: 325/km^{2} (840/sq mi)
- Time zone: UTC−06:00 (Alberta Time)
- Area codes: 403, 587, 825

Linn Valley is a hamlet in central Alberta, Canada within Red Deer County. It is located on Highway 11A, approximately 7 kilometres (4.3 mi) northwest of Red Deer.

== Demographics ==
Population history of Linn Valley
Year	Pop.	±%
1981	253	—
1986	224	−11.5%
1991	224	+0.0%
1991A	225	+0.4%
1996	242	+7.6%
2001	240	−0.8%
2006	226	−5.8%
2011	212	−6.2%
2016	213	+0.5%
2021	218	+2.3%
Source: Statistics Canada

In the 2021 Census of Population conducted by Statistics Canada, Linn Valley had a population of 218 living in 85 of its 90 total private dwellings, a change of 2.3% from its 2016 population of 213. With a land area of 0.67 km^{2} (0.26 sq mi), it had a population density of 325.4/km^{2} (842.7/sq mi) in 2021.

As a designated place in the 2016 Census of Population conducted by Statistics Canada, Linn Valley had a population of 213 living in 82 of its 85 total private dwellings, a change of 0.5% from its 2011 population of 212. With a land area of 0.68 km^{2} (0.26 sq mi), it had a population density of 313.2/km^{2} (811.3/sq mi) in 2016.

== See also ==
- List of communities in Alberta
- List of designated places in Alberta
- List of hamlets in Alberta
