= Les Trailer Park, Alberta =

Les Trailer Park
- Designated place
- Location of Les Trailer Park Les Trailer Park (Canada)
- Coordinates: 52.280°N 113.871°W
- Country: Canada
- Province: Alberta
- Region: Central Alberta
- Census division: 8
- Municipal district: Red Deer County

Government
  - Type: Unincorporated
  - Governing body: Red Deer County Council

Area (2021)
  - Land: 0.6 km^{2} (0.23 sq mi)

Population (2021)
  - Total: 58
  - Density: 96.1/km^{2} (249/sq mi)
- Time zone: UTC−06:00 (Alberta Time)
- Area codes: 403, 587, 825

Les Trailer Park is an unincorporated community in Alberta, Canada within Red Deer County that is recognized as a designated place by Statistics Canada. It is located on the east side of Range Road 280B, 0.4 km (0.25 mi) south of Highway 11. It is adjacent to the City of Red Deer to the east.

== Demographics ==
In the 2021 Census of Population conducted by Statistics Canada, Les Trailer Park had a population of 58 living in 26 of its 34 total private dwellings, a change of −1.7% from its 2016 population of 59. With a land area of 0.6 km^{2} (0.23 sq mi), it had a population density of 96.7/km^{2} (250.4/sq mi) in 2021.

As a designated place in the 2016 Census of Population conducted by Statistics Canada, Les Trailer Park had a population of 59 living in 32 of its 39 total private dwellings, a change of −57.9% from its 2011 population of 140. With a land area of 0.6 km^{2} (0.23 sq mi), it had a population density of 98.3/km^{2} (254.7/sq mi) in 2016.

== See also ==
- List of communities in Alberta
- List of designated places in Alberta
