= Balmoral Heights, Alberta =

Balmoral Heights Balmoral SE
- Designated place
- Location of Balmoral Heights Balmoral Heights (Canada)
- Coordinates: 52.275°N 113.700°W
- Country: Canada
- Province: Alberta
- Region: Central Alberta
- Census division: 8
- Municipal district: Red Deer County

Government
  - Type: Unincorporated
  - Governing body: Red Deer County Council

Area (2021)
  - Land: 0.64 km^{2} (0.25 sq mi)

Population (2021)
  - Total: 196
  - Density: 307.9/km^{2} (797/sq mi)
- Time zone: UTC−06:00 (Alberta Time)
- Area codes: 403, 587, 825

Balmoral Heights is an unincorporated community in Alberta, Canada within Red Deer County that is recognized as a designated place by Statistics Canada. It is located on the north side of Highway 11, 2.4 km (1.5 mi) east of Red Deer. It is adjacent to the designated place of Herder to the southwest. Prior to the 2021 census, Statistics Canada referred to Balmoral Heights as Balmoral SE.

== Demographics ==
In the 2021 Census of Population conducted by Statistics Canada, Balmoral Heights had a population of 196 living in 66 of its 68 total private dwellings, a change of 1.6% from its 2016 population of 193. With a land area of 0.64 km^{2} (0.25 sq mi), it had a population density of 306.3/km^{2} (793.2/sq mi) in 2021.

== See also ==
- List of communities in Alberta
- List of designated places in Alberta
