= Woodland Hills, Alberta =

Woodland Hills
- Designated place
- Location of Woodland Hills Woodland Hills (Canada)
- Coordinates: 52.227°N 113.833°W
- Country: Canada
- Province: Alberta
- Region: Central Alberta
- Census division: 8
- Municipal district: Red Deer County

Government
  - Type: Unincorporated
  - Governing body: Red Deer County Council

Area (2021)
  - Land: 0.61 km^{2} (0.24 sq mi)

Population (2021)
  - Total: 155
  - Density: 255.3/km^{2} (661/sq mi)
- Time zone: UTC−06:00 (Alberta Time)
- Area codes: 403, 587, 825

Woodland Hills is an unincorporated community in Alberta, Canada within Red Deer County that is recognized as a designated place by Statistics Canada. It is located on the east side of Range Road 275, 1.0 km (0.62 mi) southwest of Highway 2.

== Demographics ==
In the 2021 Census of Population conducted by Statistics Canada, Woodland Hills had a population of 155 living in 51 of its 51 total private dwellings, a change of 4% from its 2016 population of 149. With a land area of 0.61 km^{2} (0.24 sq mi), it had a population density of 254.1/km^{2} (658.1/sq mi) in 2021.

As a designated place in the 2016 Census of Population conducted by Statistics Canada, Woodland Hills had a population of 149 living in 50 of its 51 total private dwellings, a change of 2.1% from its 2011 population of 146. With a land area of 0.61 km^{2} (0.24 sq mi), it had a population density of 244.3/km^{2} (632.6/sq mi) in 2016.

== See also ==
- List of communities in Alberta
- List of designated places in Alberta
