= Canyon Heights, Alberta =

Canyon Heights
- Designated place
- Location of Canyon Heights Canyon Heights (Canada)
- Coordinates: 52.291°N 113.705°W
- Country: Canada
- Province: Alberta
- Region: Central Alberta
- Census division: 8
- Municipal district: Red Deer County

Government
  - Type: Unincorporated
  - Governing body: Red Deer County Council

Area (2021)
  - Land: 0.32 km^{2} (0.12 sq mi)

Population (2021)
  - Total: 33
  - Density: 104.7/km^{2} (271/sq mi)
- Time zone: UTC−06:00 (Alberta Time)
- Area codes: 403, 587, 825

Canyon Heights is an unincorporated community in Alberta, Canada within Red Deer County that is recognized as a designated place by Statistics Canada. It is located on the north side of Township Road 384, 1.6 km (0.99 mi) north of Highway 11.

== Demographics ==
In the 2021 Census of Population conducted by Statistics Canada, Canyon Heights had a population of 33 living in 15 of its 15 total private dwellings, a change of −64.5% from its 2016 population of 93. With a land area of 0.32 km^{2} (0.12 sq mi), it had a population density of 103.1/km^{2} (267.1/sq mi) in 2021.

As a designated place in the 2016 Census of Population conducted by Statistics Canada, Canyon Heights had a population of 93 living in 31 of its 32 total private dwellings, a change of 1.1% from its 2011 population of 92. With a land area of 0.17 km^{2} (0.066 sq mi), it had a population density of 547.1/km^{2} (1,416.9/sq mi) in 2016.

== See also ==
- List of communities in Alberta
- List of designated places in Alberta
