= Birchcliff =

- Summer village
- Summer Village of Birchcliff
- Location of Birchcliff in Alberta
- Coordinates: 52°21′40″N 114°07′00″W
- Country: Canada
- Province: Alberta
- Census division: No. 8

Government
  - Type: Municipal incorporation
  - Mayor: Roger Dufresne
  - Governing body: Birchcliff Summer Village Council

Area (2021)
  - Land: 0.97 km^{2} (0.37 sq mi)

Population (2021)
  - Total: 211
  - Density: 216.6/km^{2} (561/sq mi)
- Time zone: UTC−06:00 (Alberta Time)
- Website: Official website

Birchcliff is a summer village in Alberta, Canada. It is located on the eastern shore of Sylvan Lake, north of Jarvis Bay Provincial Park.

== Demographics ==
In the 2021 Census of Population conducted by Statistics Canada, the Summer Village of Birchcliff had a population of 211 living in 86 of its 229 total private dwellings, a change of 80.3% from its 2016 population of 117. With a land area of 0.97 km^{2} (0.37 sq mi), it had a population density of 217.5/km^{2} (563.4/sq mi) in 2021.

In the 2016 Census of Population conducted by Statistics Canada, the Summer Village of Birchcliff had a population of 117 living in 44 of its 98 total private dwellings, a 4.5% change from its 2011 population of 112. With a land area of 1.03 km^{2} (0.40 sq mi), it had a population density of 113.6/km^{2} (294.2/sq mi) in 2016.

== See also ==
- List of communities in Alberta
- List of francophone communities in Alberta
- List of summer villages in Alberta
- List of resort villages in Saskatchewan
