= Sunbreaker Cove =

- Summer village
- Summer Village of Sunbreaker Cove
- Location in Lacombe County

- Location of Sunbreaker Cove in Alberta
- Coordinates: 52.39298°N 114.19803°W
- Country: Canada
- Province: Alberta
- Census division: No. 8

Government
  - Type: Municipal incorporation
  - Mayor: Teresa Beets
  - Governing body: Sunbreaker Cove Summer Village Council

Area (2021)
  - Land: 0.47 km^{2} (0.18 sq mi)

Population (2021)
  - Total: 131
  - Density: 280.8/km^{2} (727/sq mi)
- Time zone: UTC−06:00 (Alberta Time)
- Website: www.sylvansummervillages.ca/sunbreakercove.php

Sunbreaker Cove is a summer village in Alberta, Canada. It is located on the northern shore of Sylvan Lake.

== Demographics ==
In the 2021 Census of Population conducted by Statistics Canada, the Summer Village of Sunbreaker Cove had a population of 131 living in 64 of its 236 total private dwellings, a change of 61.7% from its 2016 population of 81. With a land area of 0.47 km^{2} (0.18 sq mi), it had a population density of 278.7/km^{2} (721.9/sq mi) in 2021.

In the 2016 Census of Population conducted by Statistics Canada, the Summer Village of Sunbreaker Cove had a population of 81 living in 41 of its 240 total private dwellings, a 17.4% change from its 2011 population of 69. With a land area of 0.5 km^{2} (0.19 sq mi), it had a population density of 162.0/km^{2} (419.6/sq mi) in 2016.

== See also ==
- List of communities in Alberta
- List of francophone communities in Alberta
- List of summer villages in Alberta
- List of resort villages in Saskatchewan
