= Wild Rapids Waterslide Park =

Defunct water park in Alberta, Canada

Wild Rapids Waterslides
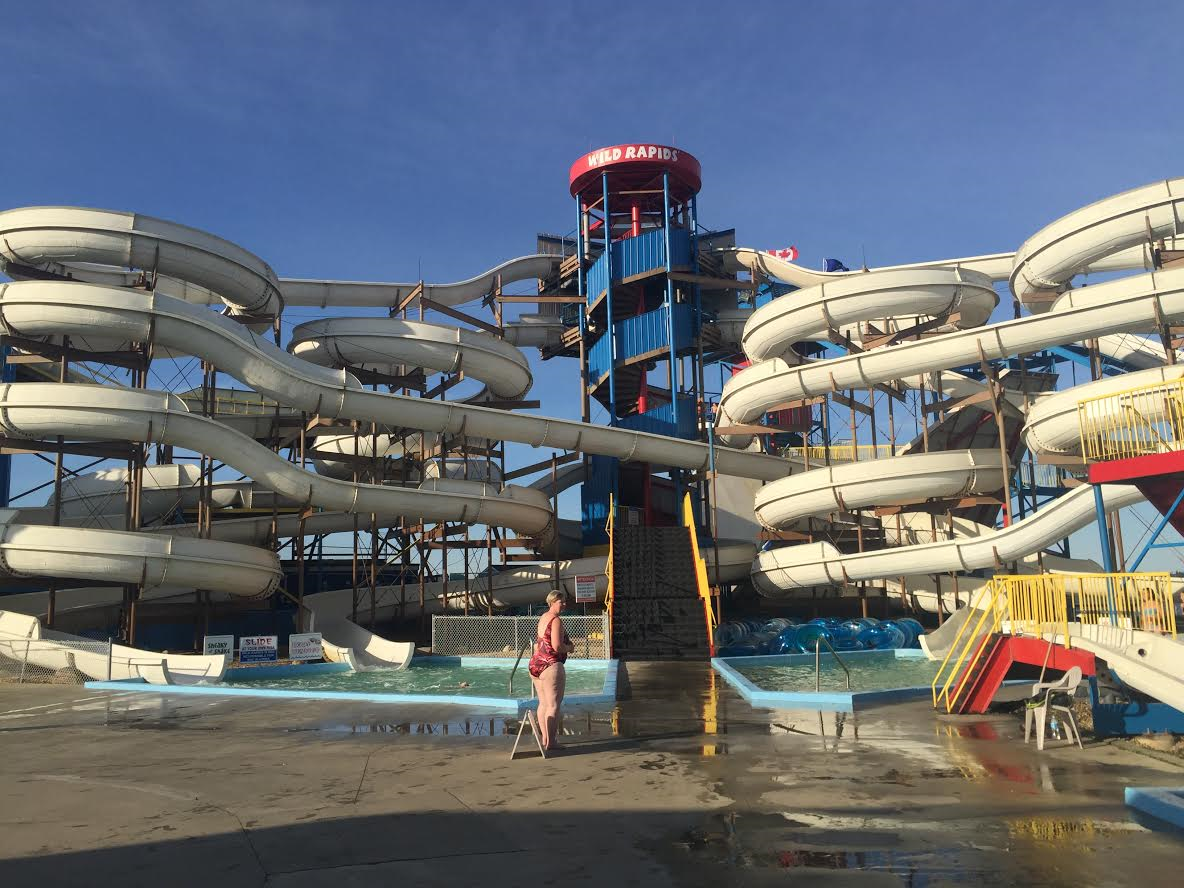
- The middle tower of the waterpark.
- Interactive map of Wild Rapids Waterslides
- Location: Sylvan Lake, Alberta
- Coordinates: 52°18′39″N 114°6′2″W
- Theme: Waterslides
- Owner: Bear Development Corporation
- General manager: Bert Messier
- Opened: 1982
- Closed: 2016
- Operating season: Summer
- Status: Defunct[[]]
- Area: Sylvan Lake
- Pools: Several small pools including three hot tubs pools
- Water slides: 12 water slides
- Children's areas: A single children's area

Wild Rapids Waterslide Park was located on the shores of Sylvan Lake in the resort town of Sylvan Lake, Alberta, Canada. Wild Rapids opened to the public in 1982, and it was Alberta's second-largest water park after the World Waterpark in West Edmonton Mall. Wild Rapids Waterslide was one of five waterslide parks in Alberta, and the last outdoor water park to operate until it closed in 2016. The park contained 12 slides, many small pools, three hot tubs, and a children's water playground. The park closed at the end of the 2016 season, after operating for 34 years. The park was located near Red Deer, between Edmonton and Calgary, along Alberta Highway 11A. Wild Rapids was the largest water park of its kind in western Canada.

== History ==
Wild Rapids Waterslide was founded in 1982 by Dave Dubeta and Garry Johnson, and opened just in time for its first full summer of operations. Wild Rapids Water Slide was built on the land previously owned by the Johnson Family, known as Sandy Cove Campsite, which was next to the public pier.

Thirty-four years later, it was announced that the park would close after the 2016 season, as it was being bought by the town of Sylvan Lake for redevelopment. The slides and equipment were put up for sale on Kijiji. The president of Bear Development Corporation, Bert Messier, hoped that an entrepreneur would see the advertisement, buy the equipment, and build another waterpark in Alberta. The children's playground was sold, and will now operate on the shores of Gull Lake.

== Attractions ==
=== Slides ===
There were 12 main slides in the park, and one small water playground that contains other small slides for children. The slides were all white in colour, except for the playground slides. While facing the park from the entrance, there was a left tower, a middle tower, and a right tower.

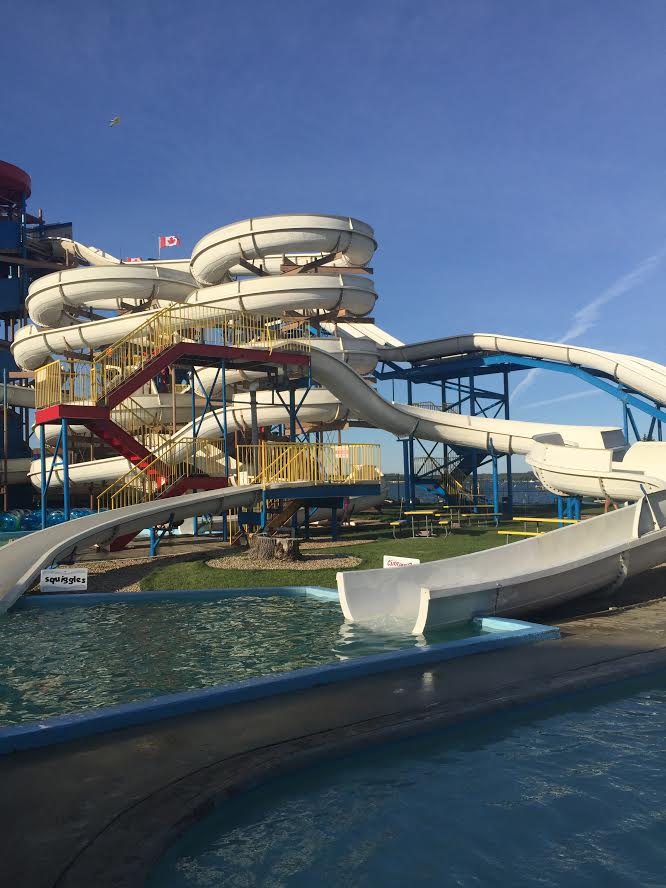
A collection of waterslides. Visible in the front of this photo are the Cinnamon twist and Squiggles. In the back of the photo are also the Sneaky Snake, Tube Blaster, Kami Kazi, Hari Kari, and other slides.

==== Individual slides ====
These slides were all beginner class body slides.

Slide	Description
Tickles	A small straight children's body slide that dropped into a pool.
Squiggles	A small children's body slide that contained only one turn before dropping into a pool. Previously known as "Wiggles".
Cinnamon Twist	A body slide with its own tower. Smaller than most of the other larger slides, but contained twists, turns, and drops. Dropped into a large pool.
Playground	A children's playground which contained several small waterslides that dropped into a large pool.

==== Middle tower ====
These slides were all intermediate class. There were three body slides and one tube slide.

Slide	Description
Body Blaster	A body slide halfway up the tower. The slider would position their body in the chute, and wait before a tank released a large wave of water that propelled the rider into the chute with twists, turns, and drops. Dropped into a splashdown pool.
Tube Blaster	A tube slide halfway up the tower. The slider sat on their tube in the chute, and waited before a tank released a large wave of water that propelled the tube-rider into the chute with twists, turns, and drops. Dropped into a splashdown pool. Single tubes only.
Sneaky Snake	A body slide which was located at the top of the tower. Many twists, turns, and drops. Dropped into a splashdown pool.
Octopussy	A body slide which was located at the top of the tower. Many twists, turns, and drops. Located opposite of the Sneaky Snake. Likely named after the James Bond film Octopussy, which was released not long after the opening of the park. Dropped into a splashdown pool.

==== Left tower (River Rides) ====
These slides were all advanced class tube slides.

Slide	Description
Hell's Gate	A large tube slide. Riders would prepare themselves in a pool at the top of the tower, before launching themselves down a steep slide. The slide contained a number of drops, turns, and pools, before finally splashing riders down into a splashdown pool. Single tubes only.
Rio Grande	A large tube slide. Riders prepared themselves in a pool at the top of the tower, before launching themselves down a steep slide. The slide contained a number of drops, turns, and pools, before finally splashing riders down into a splashdown pool. The ride was similar to Hell's Gate but had turns and drops that were different as they varied in length and direction. Likely named after the Rio Grande river. Single tubes only.

==== Right Tower ====
These slides were all extreme class. There was one tube slide and two mat slides.

Slide	Description
Kami Kazi	A very fast slide at the top of the tower. Riders raced on carpets down a series of drops, while picking up speed before slowing down in a straight-away at the bottom of the slide. Named after Japanese Kamikazes during World War II.
Hari Kari	A very fast slide at the top of the tower. Riders raced on carpets down a series of drops, while picking up speed before slowing down in a straight-away at the bottom of the slide. Staying with the Japanese theme, the slide is another name for the Japanese ritual suicide called Seppuku. The slide is identical to the Kami Kazi.
Sidewinder	A large very fast half-pipe slide which was located halfway up the tower. Riders positioned themselves at the top of the slide in either single, double, or triple tubes. Riders were then pushed down by an attendant, facing either forward or backward. Riders then sped down one side of the half-pipe, before reaching the upper portion of the other side. Riders then continued this until they stop at the vertex of the parabola. Riders were provided the option to ride in single tubes, double tubes, or triple tubes.

=== Other attractions ===
Wild Rapids Waterslides also had three hot tubs and several small pools. There were also four concessions that had been renamed.

Concessions:

- Blizzard Beach ice cream
- Sliders Grill
- Top Dogs (hot dogs)
- The Wedge pizza & subs

== Gallery ==
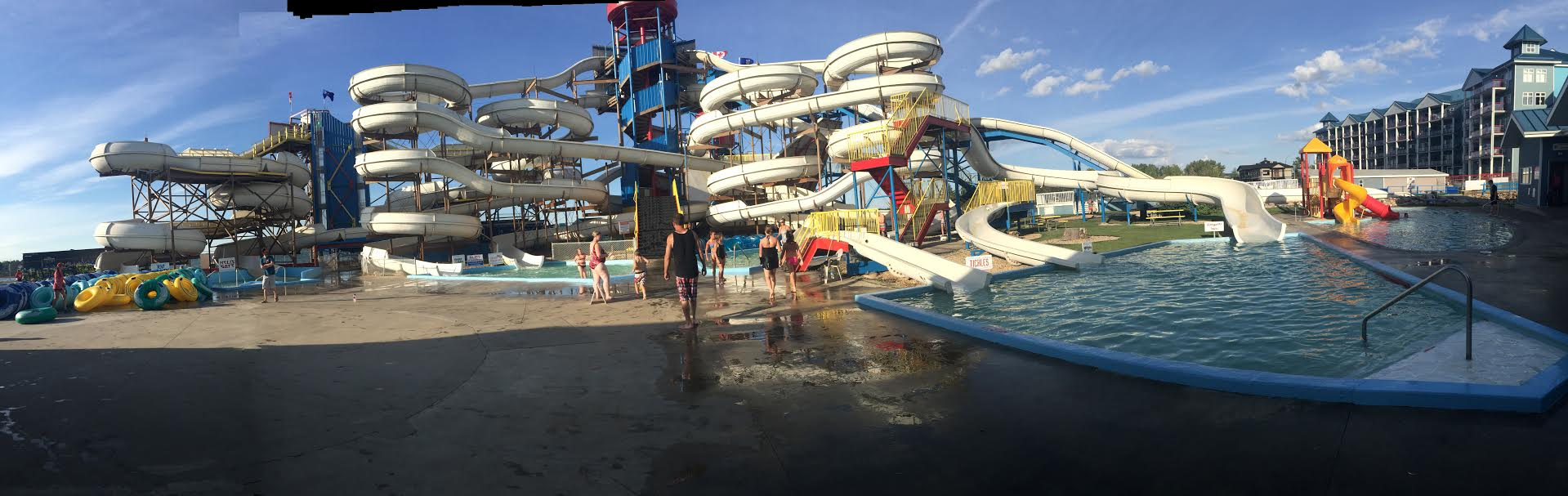
A panorama view of the waterpark. Nearly every slide is visible.

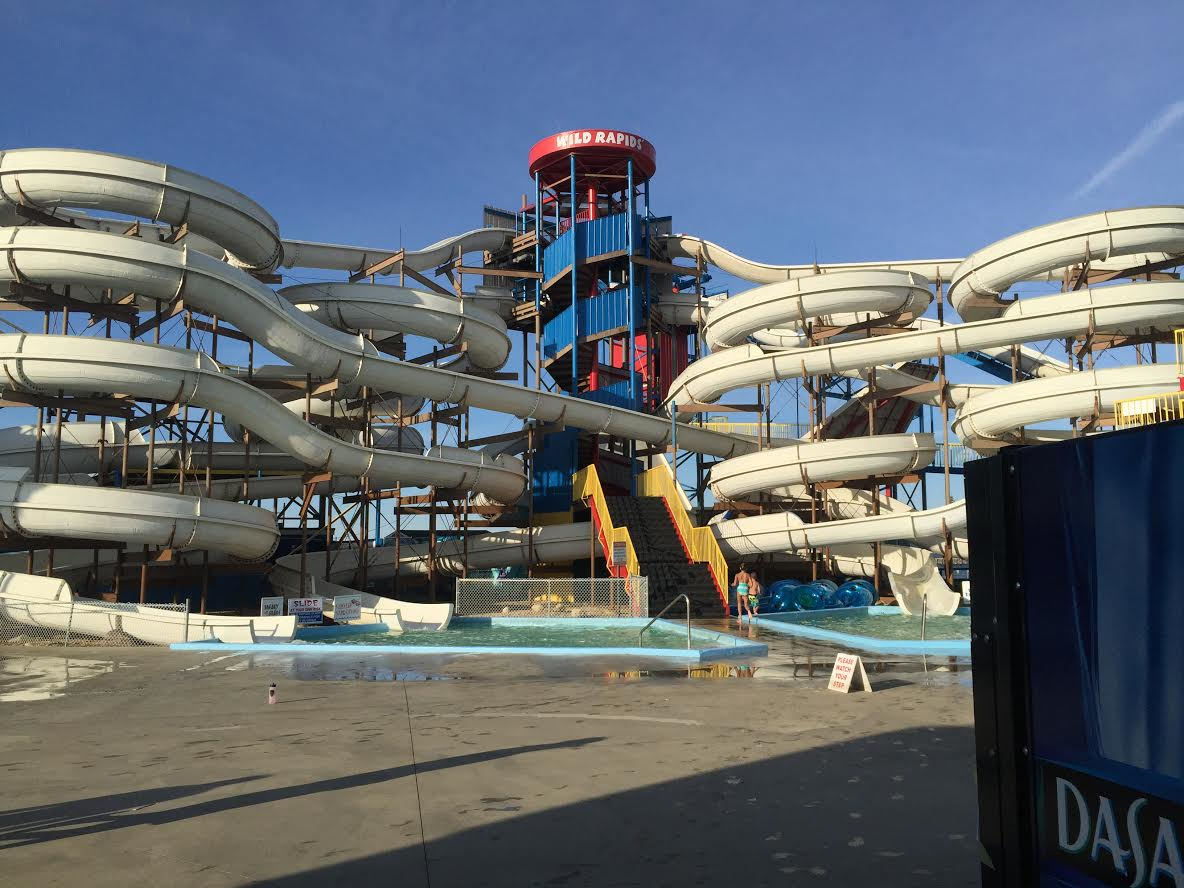
Another view of the middle tower and a vending machine.

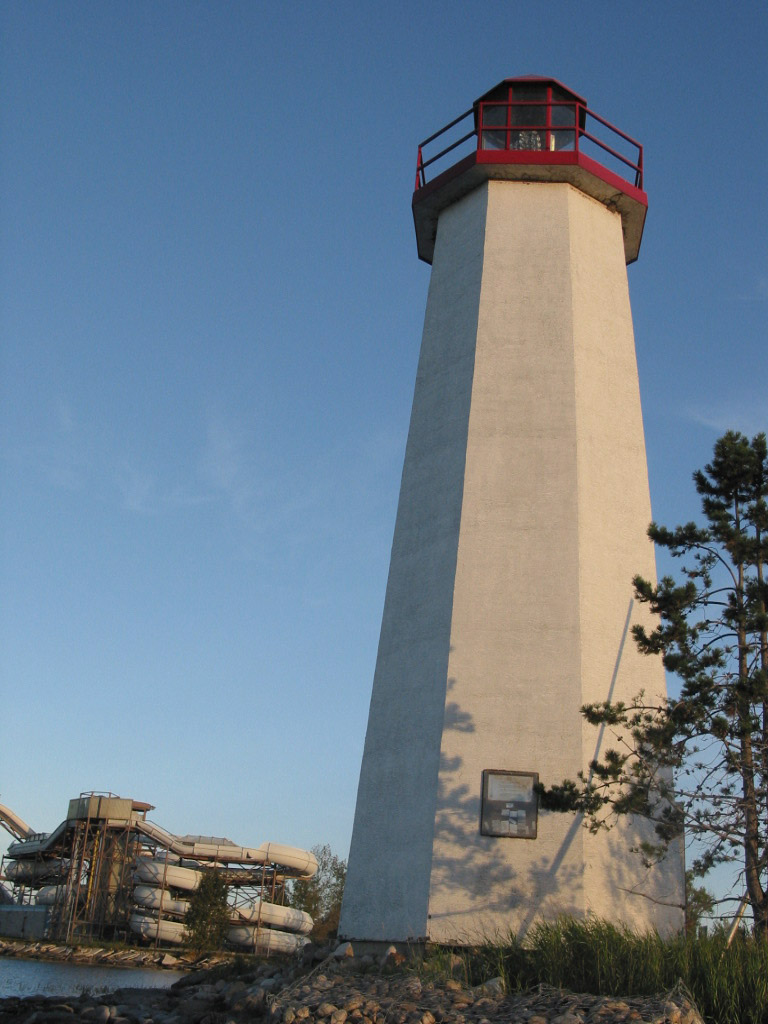
The Sylvan Lake Lighthouse with the waterslides in the background.

== See also ==
- World Waterpark
- List of water parks
