= World Waterpark =

Water park in Alberta, Canada

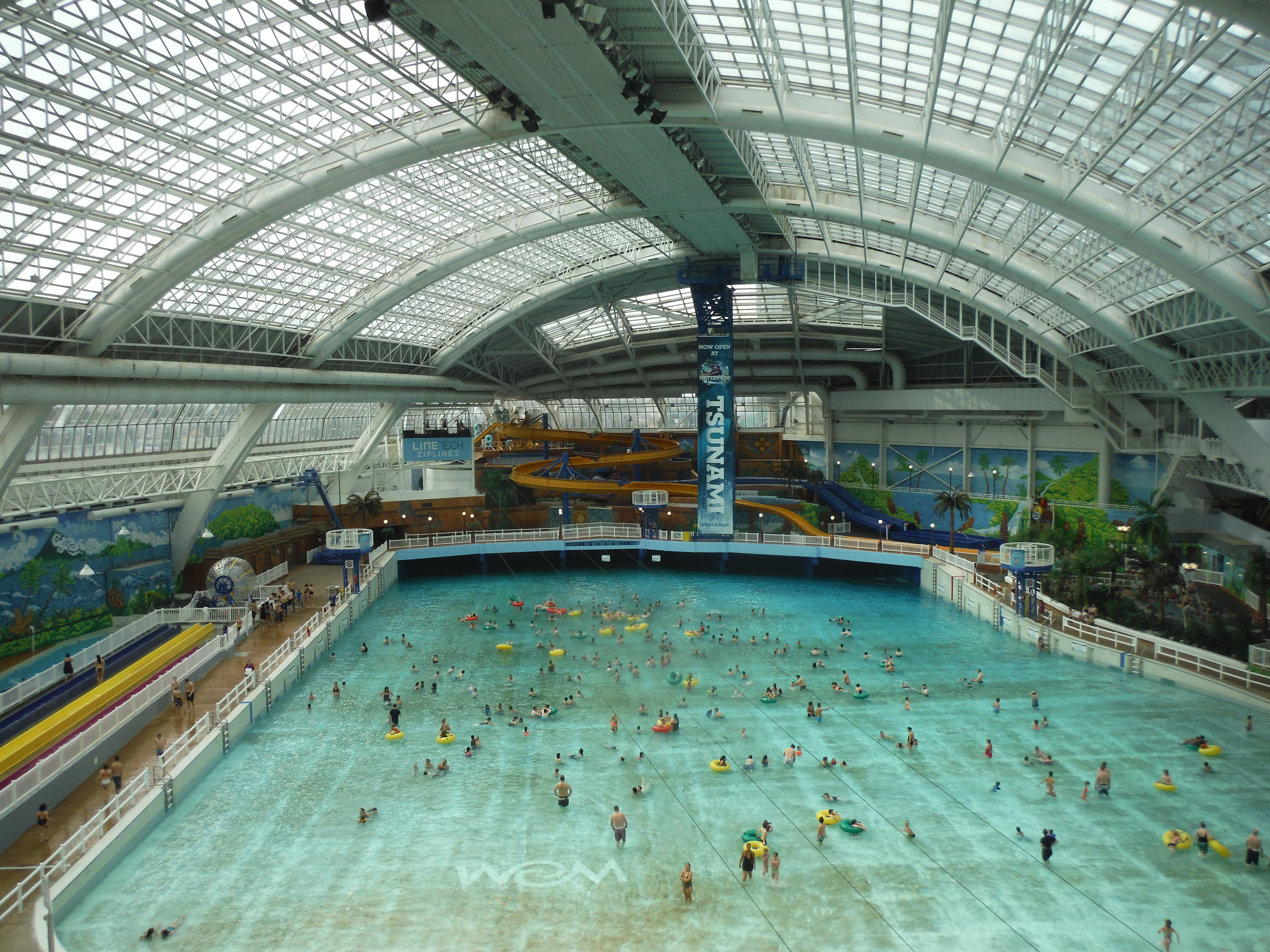
- The logo above was used from 2011-2018. The Blue Thunder wave pool as seen from a platform of the web of staircases used to access the slides. Sun Runner (the yellow slide) and the former Raging Rapids (the blue slide) are also visible in the background.
- Interactive map of World Waterpark
- Slogan: Wet, wild and wonderful!
- Location: West Edmonton Mall, Edmonton, Alberta, Canada
- Coordinates: 53°31′19″N 113°37′33″W
- Owner: West Edmonton Mall Properties Inc.
- Operated by: West Edmonton Mall Properties Inc.
- General manager: Keenyn Bijou
- Opened: April 15, 1986; 40 years ago
- Operating season: All year round
- Visitors per annum: 560,000
- Area: 19,974 square metres (215,000 ft^{2})
- Pools: 3 pools
- Water slides: 17 water slides
- Children's areas: 2 children's areas
- Website: Official website

World Waterpark is a water park located within the West Edmonton Mall in Edmonton, Alberta, Canada. Opened to the public in 1986, it is the second largest indoor water park in North America after American Dream's DreamWorks Water Park which opened on October 1, 2020. It has a maximum capacity of 5,000 guests, an average air temperature of 31 °C (88 °F) and contains the world's largest indoor wave pool with a capacity of 12.5 million liters.

The highest slides in the park are Twister, Sky Screamer, and Cyclone, which are all 83 ft (25.3 m) high. The park has undergone many changes over the years having gained slides, lost slides, replaced slides, and added completely new attractions.

In 2020, World Waterpark temporarily closed for the first time due to the COVID-19 pandemic in Canada. While some parts did temporarily close, the whole park did not close down until mid-March 2020. It reopened on July 18, 2020.

== Blue Thunder wave pool ==
This wave pool has four active wave bays, each with 2 panels operated by a 1,100-kilowatt (1,500 hp) hydraulic system (8 total active panels). For many years, the 4 panels in the two outer wave bays have been disabled, apparently due to the waves being far too intense, resulting in injuries; guests were being thrown into each other when all 12 panels were operating, as they were in the 1980s.

Waves are generated (in 10 minutes on, 5 minutes off sessions) of approximately 1.2 to 1.5 m (3.9 to 4.9 ft), utilizing only the 8 active wave panels. It is arguably the most popular attraction in the park, as many swimmers (most with inner tubes) can be found bobbing in the water. The start of every session is marked with a loud air horn blast, warning swimmers to be ready for a wave to flip them over. This air horn also sounds when the park opens or closes.

Most evenings, after regular park business hours, the Blue Thunder wave pool is used by clubs for surfing, kayaking, and stand-up paddleboarding. For these activities, the waves are often programmed for increased intensity and continuous operation.

In September 2018, the water park underwent a $2.5 million renovation including repainting the wave pool, renovated cabanas, additional bathrooms, new beach area flooring, and upgraded signage.

== Slides ==
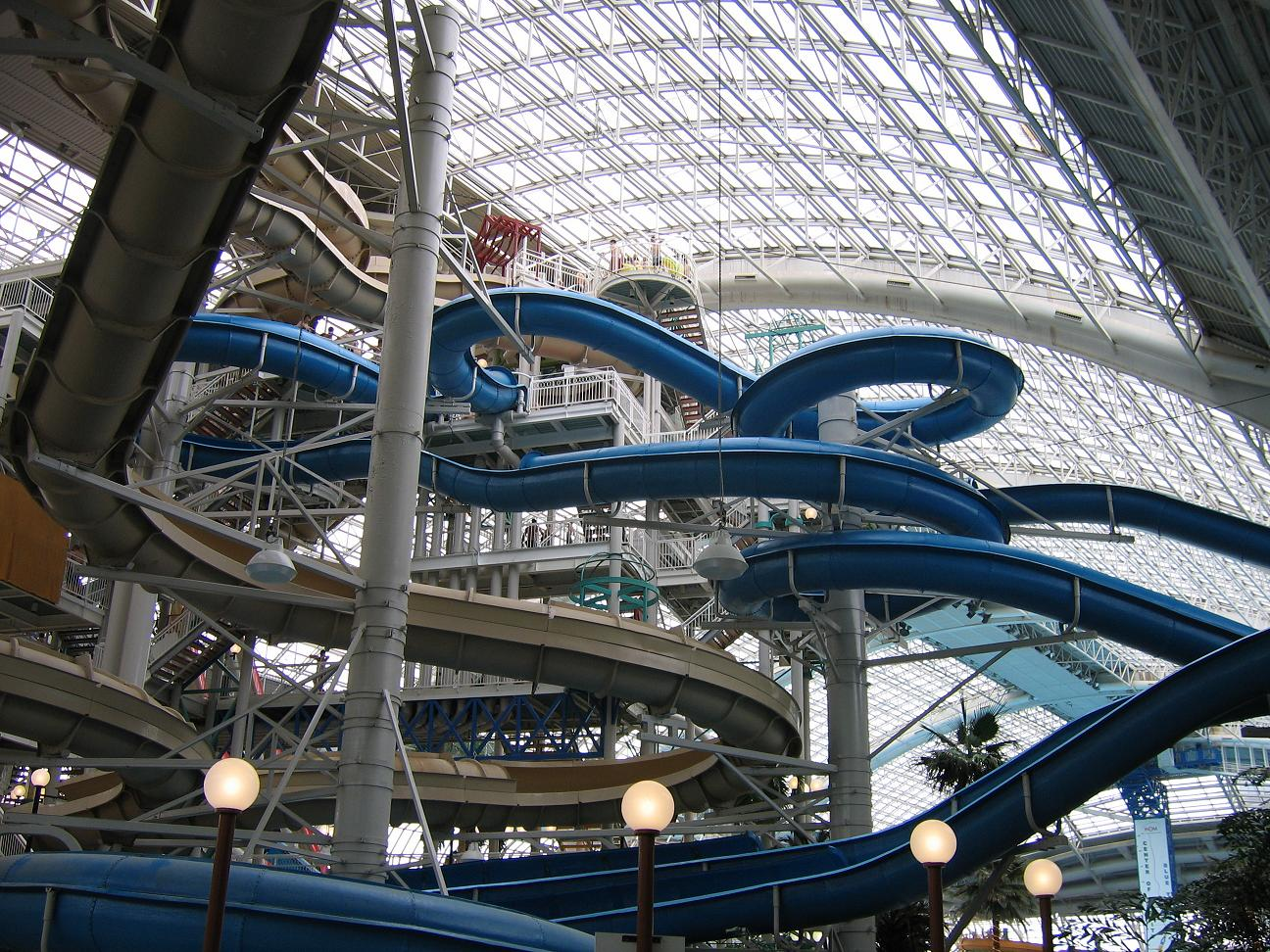
A collection of waterslides. Visible in this photo are the Howler, Twister, and the original design of the Blue Bullet.

=== Beginner slides ===
Slide	Year opened	Description
Caribbean Cove	2008	A large play structure that was constructed in 2008 to replace The Little Caribbean. Caribbean Cove contains 3 slides, pipes, pull ropes, water buckets, rope walks, and a 1200-liter bucket that dumps water down the front of the structure every 2 minutes. The water level is less than a few centimeters deep.
Caribbean Cruiser	Unknown	A beginner slide designed for small children that drops into a 1' splashdown pool. It also has a small platform at the bottom which slows riders down before depositing them in the pool.
Dolphin Kiddie Pool	Unknown	A small, dolphin-themed play park for children. There are various water toys, a water screw, a low triple chute, and a playground-type slide with dolphin scenery. During the park's early years, the play park was frog-themed.
Sun Runner	Unknown	A yellow slide designed for rafts that can support a maximum of three people. It is one of the only slides in the park that does not have a splashdown pool (it has a padded trough instead). The Sun Runner's name is from the Edmonton Sun, a local newspaper that currently holds the naming rights. Sun Runner is the only slide that has a sponsor's name on it. It is unknown if the sponsorship is still ongoing.
Splash Pad	Unknown	A zero-depth water playground, similar to ones found at parks around Edmonton that operate in the summer.

=== Intermediate slides ===
Slide	Year opened	Description
Slideboarding	2016	An interactive waterslide that integrates a video game into the slide. Players match the colored lights to the buttons on slide boards to score points and unlock new levels. The game was phased out in 2020 (with no music) and standard inner tubes are used instead. This is a Gamified Slideboarding Waterslide by WhiteWater West.
Double Trouble	2023	Two slides with winding corners and transparent and color-changing sections, although is mainly orange and blue. Passengers go through the ride with double or single length tubes. It stands 50 ft tall and 450 ft long. Double Trouble was the replacement for Corkscrew, an older beginner slide.

=== Advanced slides ===
Slide	Year opened	Description
Twister	1986	Twister is one of the 3 highest slides in the park and one of the few slides left since the official park opening that still retains its original form and color. The brown aged paint on the slide has slowly been removed in recent years, along with Howler.
Howler	1986	A dark slide that is around three-quarters enclosed, which drops riders into a 1.2-metre-deep (3.9 ft) splashdown pool. The left chute was shut down for over a decade due to safety concerns and was eventually removed and replaced by Slideboarding.
Blue Bullet	Original: 1986, Current: 2008	A blue slide that offers different experiences on both sides. The left side has translucent areas that allow some light to come in, while the right side is completely dark. The original Blue Bullet was partially enclosed but was removed from the park in July 2008 due to a large number of injuries sustained by riders. However, the slide reopened later in November 2008, having been removed and replaced with a new slide and maintaining the same name.

=== Extreme slides ===
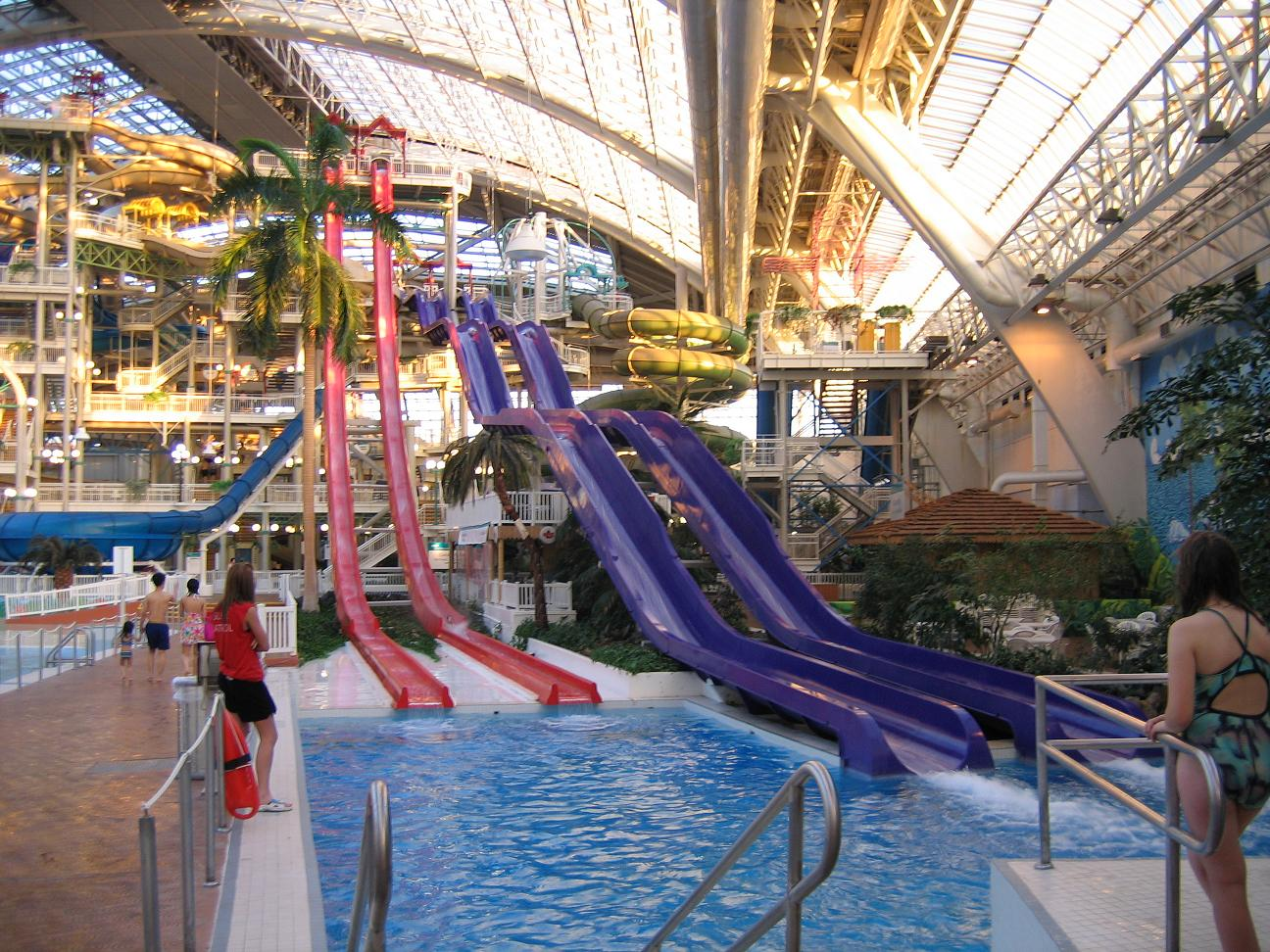
Nessie's Revenge (purple) and the original Sky Screamer (red) at World Waterpark. Also visible is Tropical Typhoon (the blue slide), the Corkscrew (the green slide behind Nessie's Revenge), and the launch platform for Thunderbolt (on the right).

Slide	Year opened	Description
Nessie's Revenge	1986	A very fast purple slide with 3 bumps and no curves, similar in design to an amusement park slide. Before the park's renovations, Nessie's Revenge had a light brownish-tan color. However, during the park's large makeover in the early 2000s, Nessie's Revenge was painted purple, and in 2021 the slide was given a lighter purple paint.
Tropical Typhoon	2003	A low and quick slide where riders slide down a short tunnel and into a large bowl in which they slide around and around before dropping out of a hole in the middle into 3.0 metres (10 ft) of water. Tropical Typhoon is often nicknamed the "Toilet Bowl." It is the replacement of one of the park's first slides called "Cannonball".
Sky Screamer Extreme	2011	Modelled similarly to the original Sky Screamer but begins with a vertical trap door at the top. One is an open yellow vertical slide, while the other is an enclosed blue one. Unlike the original Sky Screamer, both slides end in a splashdown chute similar to Blue Bullet. This slide is an Aquadrop by WhiteWater West
Cyclone	2011	A purple/pink colored slide built by WhiteWater West, featuring an aqualoop.

=== Decommissioned slides ===
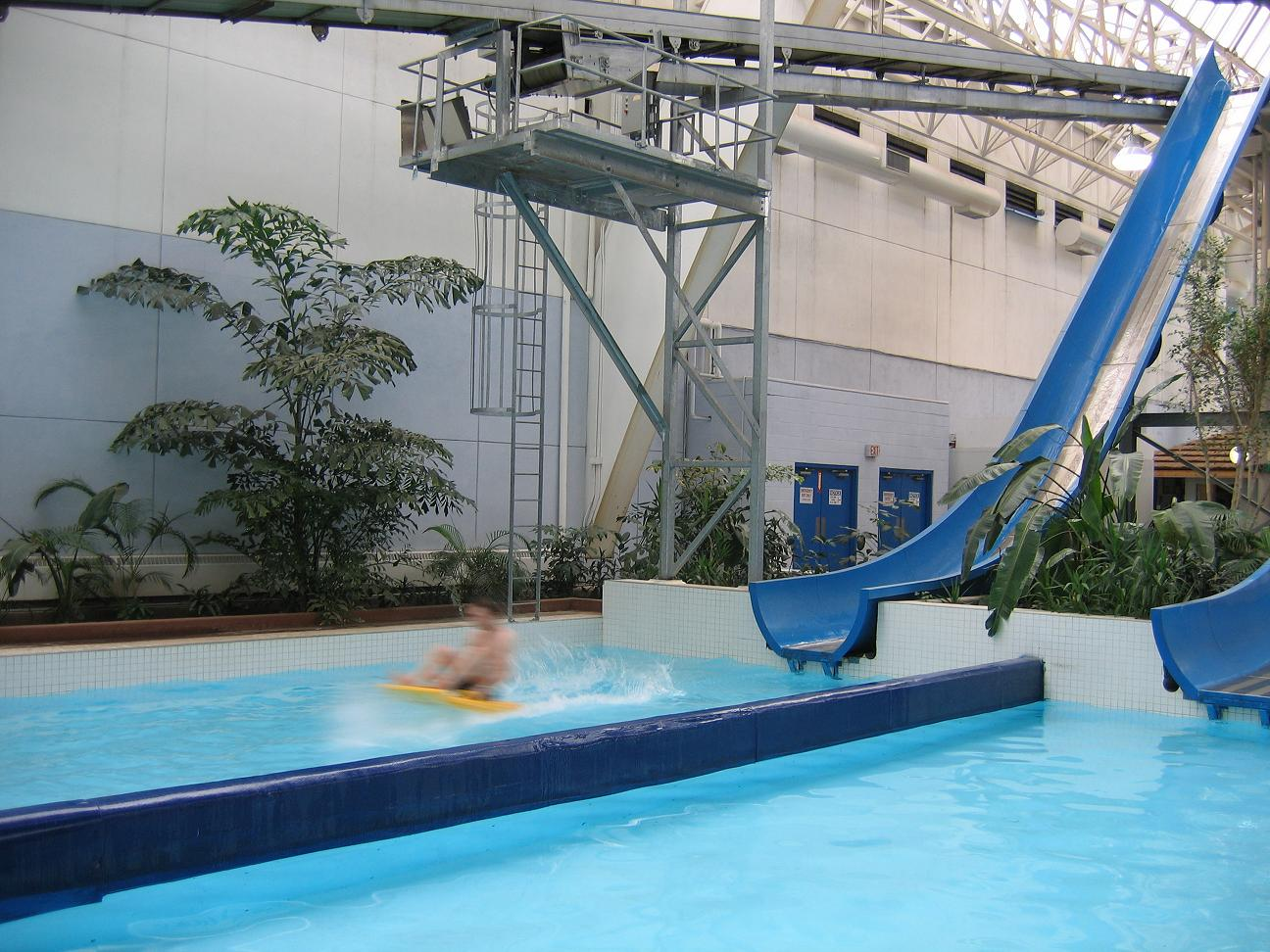
Thunderbolt sled slide at World Waterpark. (1986 to 2014)

Slide	Year opened	Year closed	Description
Geronimo's Jump	1986	Unknown	A triple slide with straight blue chutes which would send sliders freefalling into a 3.0-metre-deep (10 ft) splashdown pool. Removed for the area to be converted to Tap Works (now Splash Pad).
Cannon Ball Run	1986	2002	A twirly Chute colored olive green-like Corkscrew, and in its final years blue like Blue Bullet; was removed and in its place was put Tropical Typhoon.
The Little Caribbean	1986	2007	Another play area with three small slides and a bumper boats area. Along with Tap Works, The Little Caribbean was permanently closed to make way for the Caribbean Cove in 2008.
Tap Works	Unknown	2007	A kids' play park, revolving around taps and pipes. It contained some adjusting wheels for kids to change the flow of water, as well as several high-powered water guns. It is now a Splash Pad.
Sky Screamer (original slide)	1986	2011	A steep, bright red slide. It was painted red in 2004, before being removed in February 2012 to make way for the drop-box Sky Screamer slides.
Center of Gravity	1991	2013	Built in 1990 and opened in 1991 as the Wild Gravity Bungee. It was operated by a separate company until 1998 when the mall bought the lease and it was renamed the Blue Thunder Bungee. The bungee tower changed owners again in 2005, and the name was changed for the final time to Center of Gravity. The attraction permanently closed on April 7, 2013. The bungee tower still stands, but the equipment has long since been sold off.
Thunderbolt (former name: White Lightning)	1986	2014	Riders went down one of a pair of steep slides on a special sled. The sleds flew into a long pool of water that gradually got shallower. Removed for installation of Flowrider. The stairs heading up to the former slide still stand.
Raging Rapids	Original: 1986, Revised: 2003	Original: 2002, Revised: 2016	A lazy river ride with two routes. Originally much longer, during the Waterpark's overhaul in 2004, the ride was reshaped into its final incarnation and painted over. The slide was temporarily closed for a long time. Due to delays, it was closed permanently in 2016.
Hurricane	2012	2018	An inflatable ball within a ball that contains water and rotates. It was removed to make way for additional Cabanas.
Corkscrew	1986	2022	A completely enclosed slide that twirls and twists into a 1.2-metre-deep (3.9 ft) pool of water. The slides were repainted entirely green in the 2018 renovation. Permanently closed on November 14, 2022, and removed that same week due to the "end of life" expectancy for the slide.
Flowrider	2015	2024	Formally known as Tsunami, FlowRider is a surf simulator for flowboarding and bodyboarding. Opened in January 2015 and closed in March 2024. Surfside Pickleball was partially put in its place, however most of the former space remains vacant.

=== Additional attractions ===
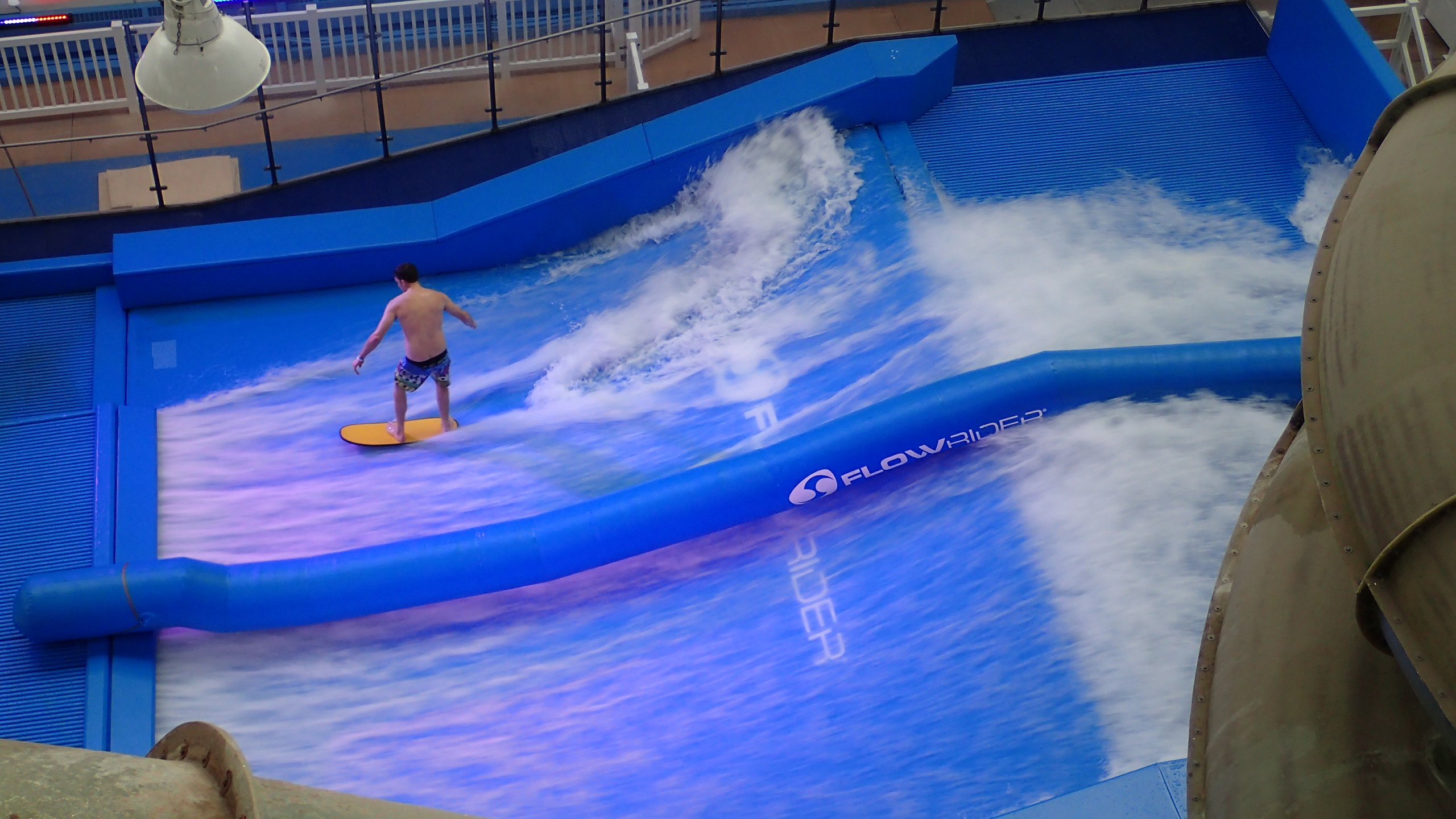
The former FlowRider surf simulator, viewed from the waterslide tower. A small portion of the former Corkscrew chute is seen.

Ride	Description
Surfside Pickleball	Pickleball table introduced in 2024 partially replacing the Flowrider, available to rent.
Sky Flyer Zipline	World's largest permanent indoor zipline, at 140 metres (450 ft) length. Linetech ziplines start at the southwest corner of the waterpark and traverse the Blue Thunder wave pool to just past the Dolphin-themed children's area. Formerly called King Swing Zip Line and Linetech Ziplines.

=== Other information ===
World Waterpark also has two hot tubs: one double and one single.

Concessions:

- Beachview Bar/Snacks
- Piña Colada Bar
- Sharky's Grill (formerly Coconut Grove)
- Tiki Snacks (formerly Tiki Dog)

Former:

- Hot Dog Hut
- BeaverTails (BeaverTails has since returned to WEM, although not in the World Waterpark)
- Coca-Cola Freestyle

Tubes can be rented at a cost, while PFDs (lifejackets) can be borrowed for no charge at Sharky's Supply Shack.

== Gallery ==
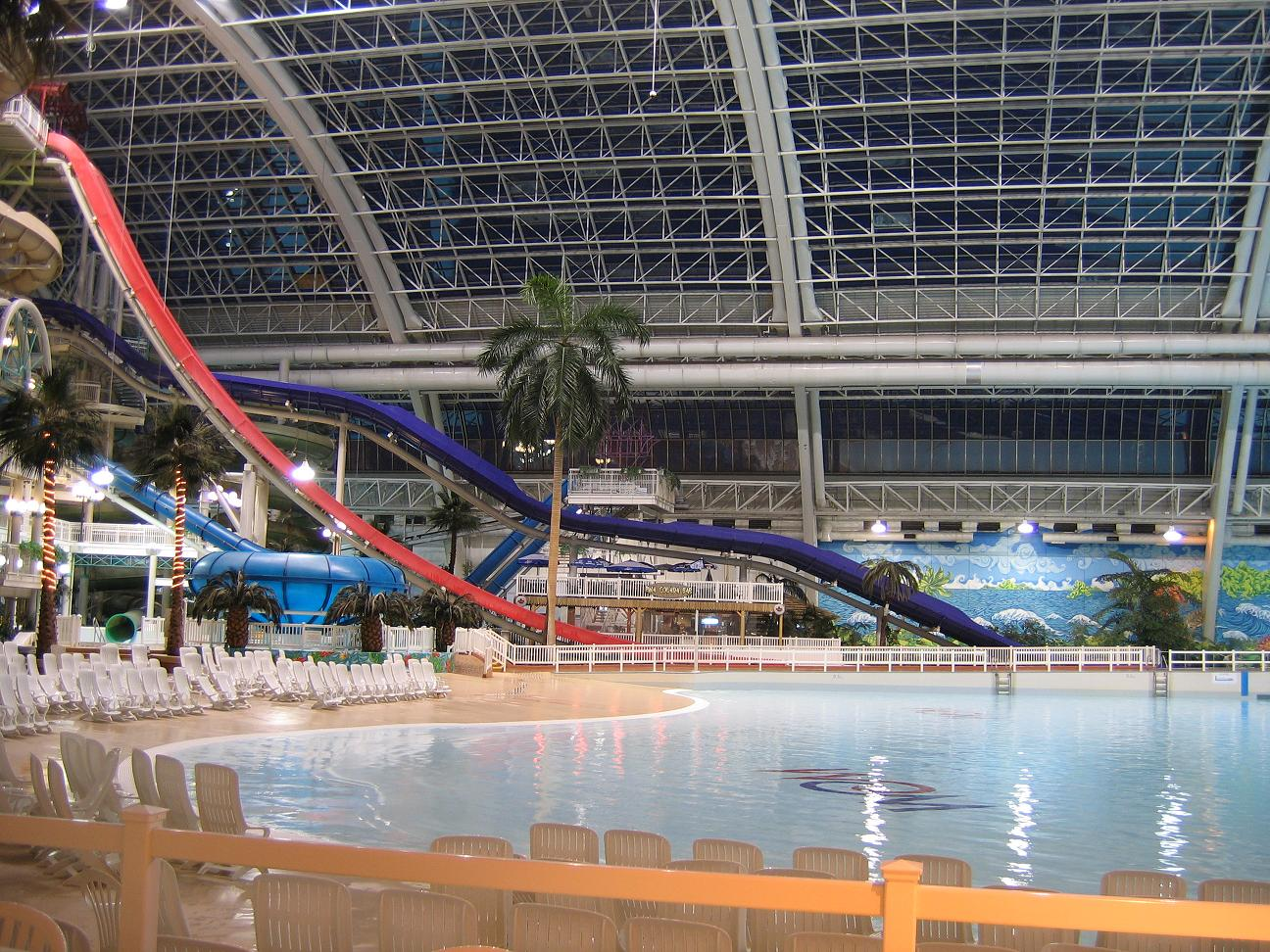
Sky Screamer and Nessie's Revenge - side view

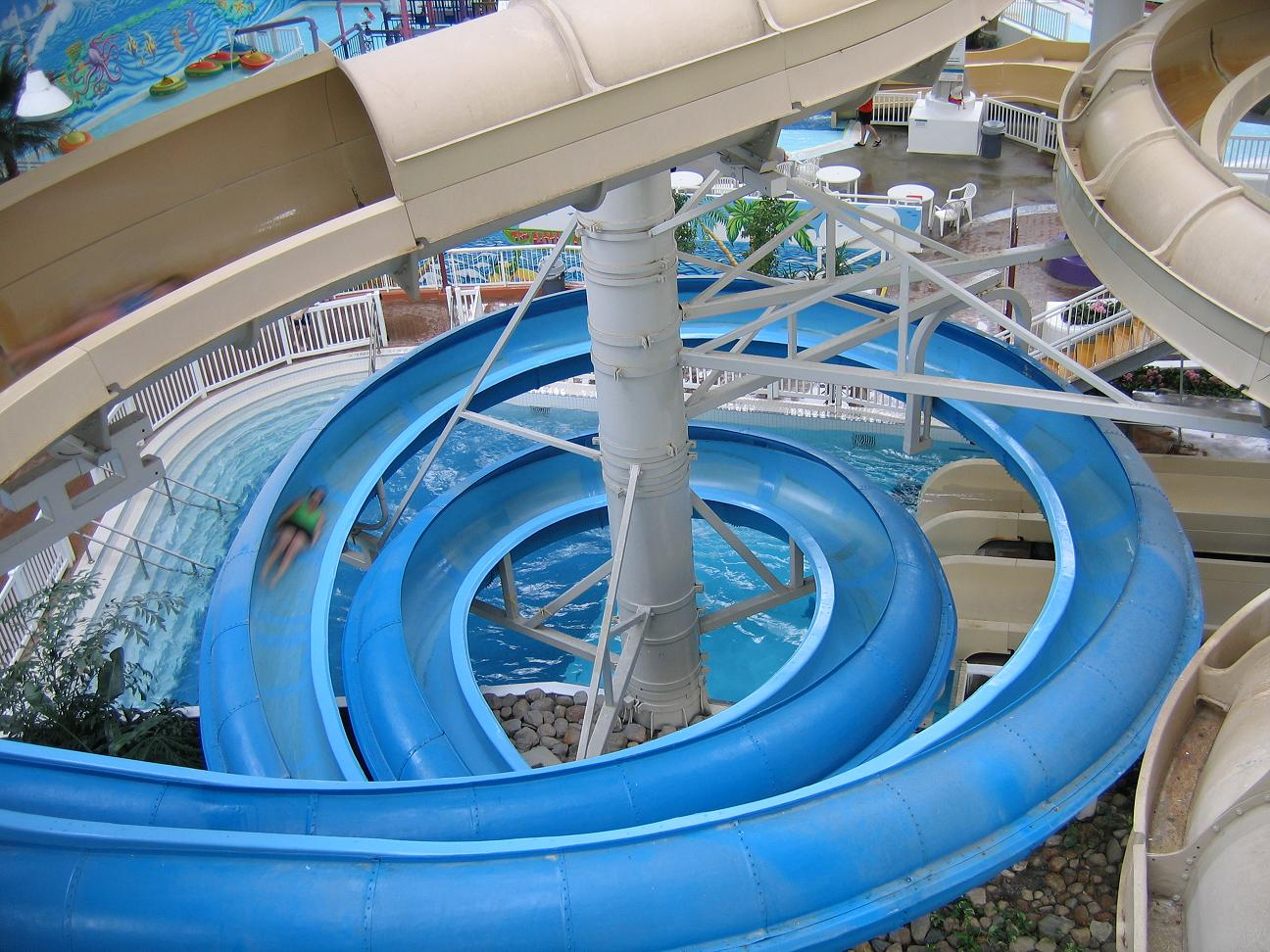
Blue Bullet before renovations

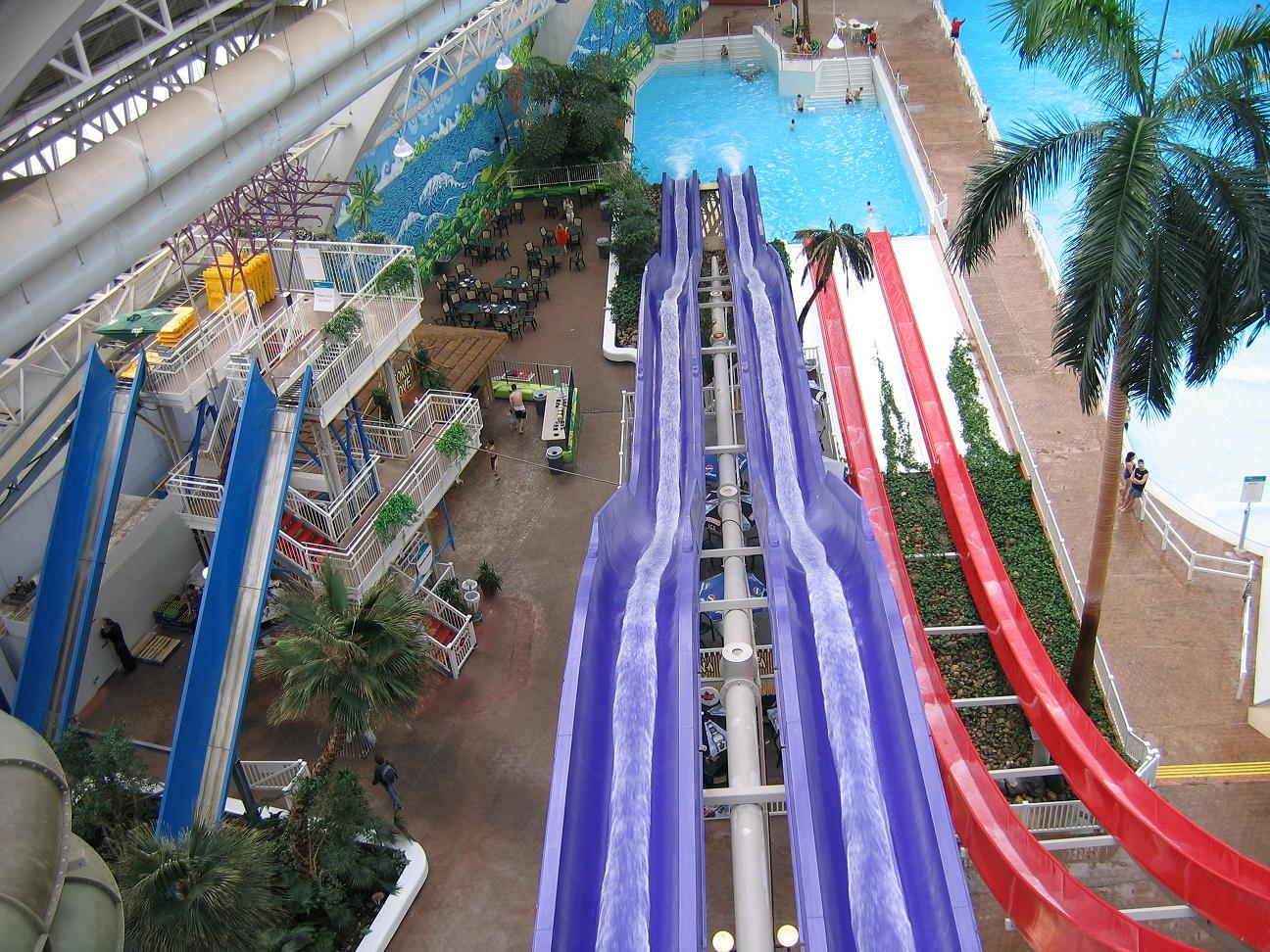
L-R Thunderbolt, Nessie's Revenge, Sky Screamer

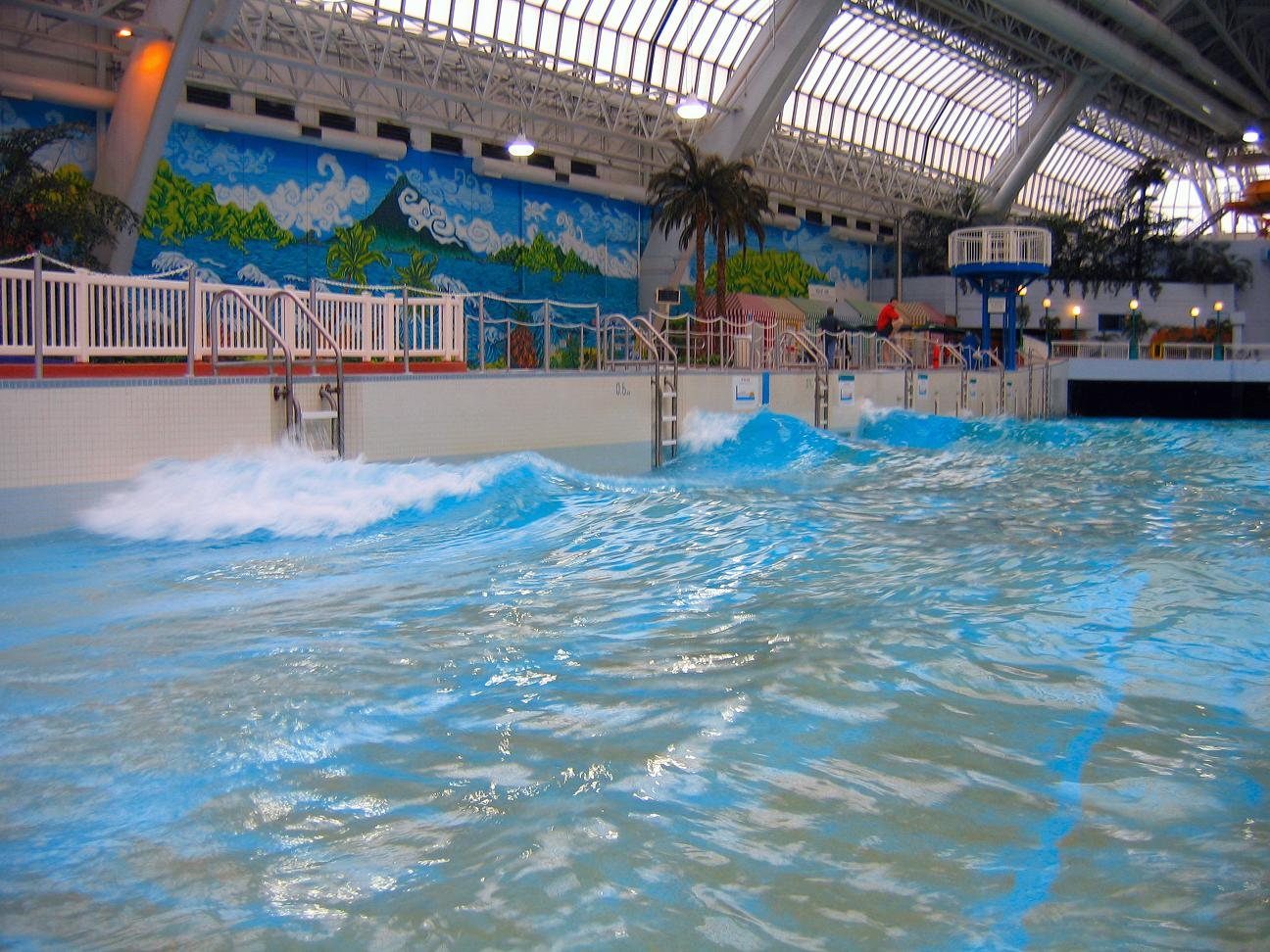
Blue Thunder Wave Pool -6FT Waves

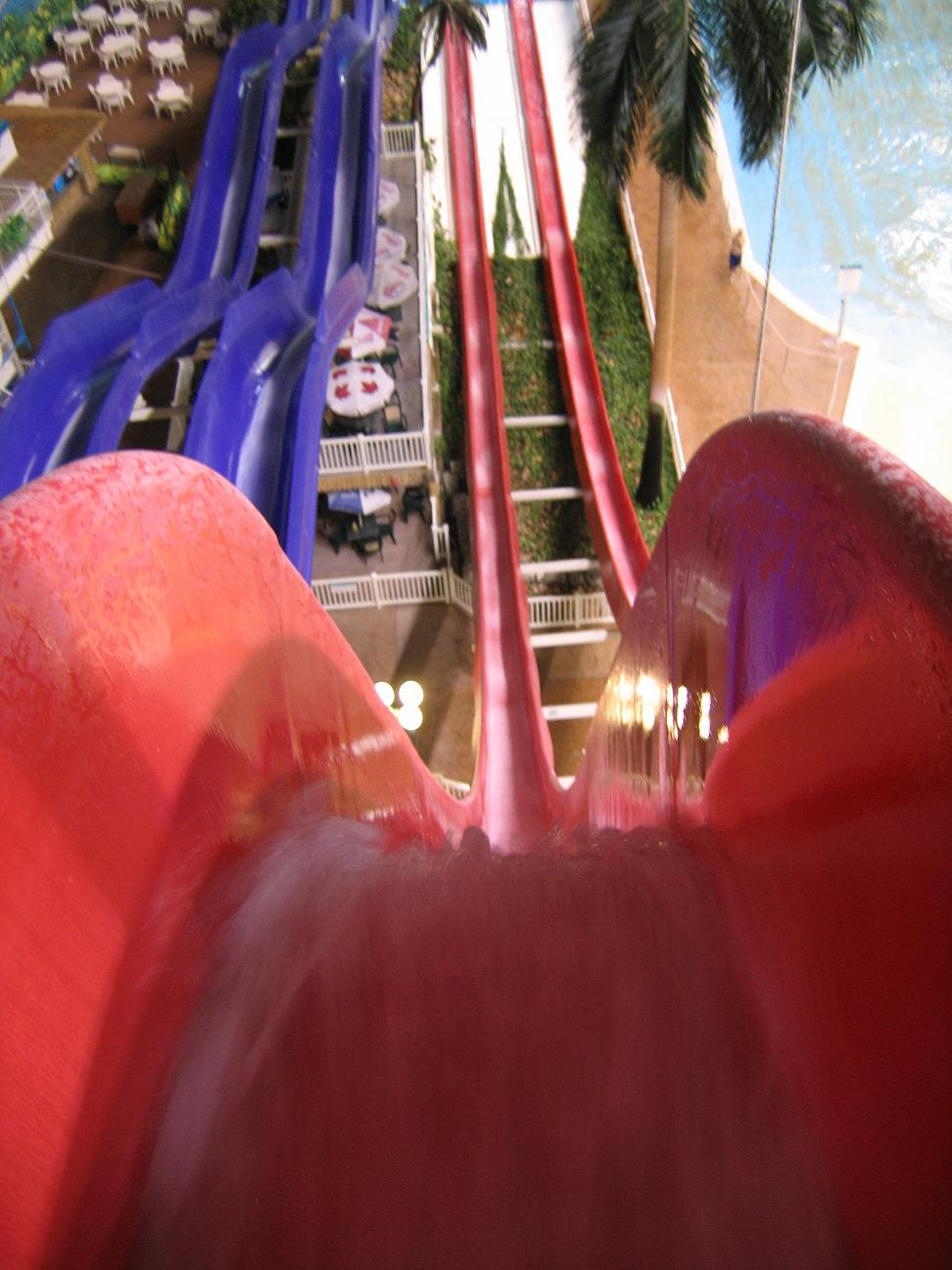
Sky Screamer

== See also ==
- Galaxyland
- Wild Rapids Waterslides
