= Jarvis Bay Provincial Park =

Provincial park in Alberta, Canada

- Location within Alberta
- Interactive map of Jarvis Bay Provincial Park
- Location: Lacombe County, Alberta, Canada
- Nearest city: Sylvan Lake
- Coordinates: 52°20′43″N 114°05′11″W
- Area: 0.9 km^{2} (0.35 sq mi)
- Established: July 8, 1965
- Visitors: 13,328 (in 2005-2006)
- Governing body: Alberta Tourism, Parks and Recreation

Jarvis Bay Provincial Park is a provincial park in Alberta, Canada, located 4 km (2.5 mi) north from Sylvan Lake and 35 km (22 mi) west from Red Deer, along Highway 20.

The park is situated on the eastern shores of Sylvan Lake, at an elevation of 950 m (3,120 ft) and has a surface of 0.9 km^{2} (0.35 sq mi). It was established on July 8, 1965, and is maintained by Alberta Tourism, Parks and Recreation.

== History ==
The development for the park began in 1964, when Alberta Parks became aware of an ideal area of land on Sylvan Lake's eastern shore that was for sale. The decision to purchase the land was made due to the nearby Sylvan Lake Provincial Park (now no longer a provincial park) lacked the facilities that most provincial parks had such as a campground. The park was opened on July 8, 1965, and the roads were graded and gravelled in 1968. Work on the park was not fully completed until the early 1970s. From 2004 to 2019, Jarvis Bay was among 10 of Alberta's provincial parks that enforced a temporary liquor ban during the Victoria Day long weekend. In 2017, Jarvis Bay saw major upgrades to its campground, sewer, and power grid. Campsites were changed to better accommodate modern RVs, while additional campsites were added to the north loop, as well as washrooms with flushable toilets and showers. This led to the park being closed from September 2017 to May 2018 for construction. The origins for the name "Jarvis Bay" is unclear, however it could be named for E.W. Jarvis, a surveyor for CP Rail or W.D. Jarvis, an early NWMP inspector.

== Activities ==
Activities in the park itself include camping, biking, hiking, and birdwatching. The park is also a short drive from the town of Sylvan Lake which allows more water-based activities.

== Facilities ==
The provincial park features two campgrounds; the main campground which features 140 campsites, and the North Loop campground which has 55 and is tent only. The park also has four group use areas all together in the north east corner of the park. All campsites have campfires, and the majority have electricity (192 sites during the main season and 54 during the fall season), only one campsite has its own potable water and costs extra. The group use areas have campfires, electricity, two picnic shelters, two washrooms, and potable water. In total the park has a grocery store, 2 playgrounds, 10 parking lots, 17 potable water taps, 11 washrooms, an amphitheatre, showers, and a dump station. The lakeshore is a steep cliff, so the park has no lake access or beach.

== Fauna and Flora ==
The fauna and flora of Jarvis Bay is typical of its parkland habitat, with over 70 recorded species of birds and multiple species other animals inhabiting the park. Common birds in the park include Downy woodpecker, Least flycatcher, Red-eyed vireo, Yellow warbler, White-throated sparrow, Chipping sparrow, and Brown-headed cowbird. Common butterflies found in the park include Hobomok skipper, Milbert's tortoiseshell, Northern cloudywing, Northwestern fritillary, Canadian tiger swallowtail, and Mourning cloak. Mammals in the park include American red squirrel, Least chipmunk, Meadow vole, Mule deer, and Moose. Other animals in the park include Wood frog and Common garter snake. Common plants include Red baneberry, Canada violet, Purple clematis, Prickly rose, Dwarf red blackberry, Beaked hazelnut, and Choke cherry.

== See also ==
- List of provincial parks in Alberta
- List of Canadian provincial parks
- List of National Parks of Canada
