= Norglenwold =

- Summer village
- Summer Village of Norglenwold
- Location of Norglenwold in Alberta
- Coordinates: 52.324°N 114.124°W
- Country: Canada
- Province: Alberta
- Census division: No. 8

Government
  - Type: Municipal incorporation
  - Mayor: Cyril S. Gurevitch, K.C.
  - Governing body: Norglenwold Summer Village Council

Area (2021)
  - Land: 0.62 km^{2} (0.24 sq mi)

Population (2021)
  - Total: 306
  - Density: 490.8/km^{2} (1,271/sq mi)
- Time zone: UTC−06:00 (Alberta Time)
- Website: Official website

Norglenwold is a summer village in central Alberta, Canada. It is located on the southeast shore of Sylvan Lake adjacent to the Town of Sylvan Lake.

== Demographics ==
In the 2021 Census of Population conducted by Statistics Canada, the Summer Village of Norglenwold had a population of 306 living in 132 of its 204 total private dwellings, a change of 12.1% from its 2016 population of 273. With a land area of 0.62 km^{2} (0.24 sq mi), it had a population density of 493.5/km^{2} (1,278.3/sq mi) in 2021.

In the 2016 Census of Population conducted by Statistics Canada, the Summer Village of Norglenwold had a population of 273 living in 112 of its 211 total private dwellings, a 17.7% change from its 2011 population of 232. With a land area of 0.62 km^{2} (0.24 sq mi), it had a population density of 440.3/km^{2} (1,140.4/sq mi) in 2016.

== See also ==
- List of communities in Alberta
- List of summer villages in Alberta
- List of resort villages in Saskatchewan
