= Jarvis Bay =

- Summer village
- Summer Village of Jarvis Bay
- Location of Jarvis Bay in Alberta
- Coordinates: 52.33527°N 114.074444°W
- Country: Canada
- Province: Alberta
- Census division: No. 8

Government
  - Type: Municipal incorporation
  - Mayor: Robert Thomlinson
  - Governing body: Jarvis Bay Summer Village Council

Area (2021)
  - Land: 0.55 km^{2} (0.21 sq mi)

Population (2021)
  - Total: 213
  - Density: 390.7/km^{2} (1,012/sq mi)
- Time zone: UTC−06:00 (Alberta Time)
- Website: Official website

Jarvis Bay is a summer village in Alberta, Canada. It is located on the eastern shore of Sylvan Lake south of Jarvis Bay Provincial Park.

== Demographics ==
In the 2021 Census of Population conducted by Statistics Canada, the Summer Village of Jarvis Bay had a population of 213 living in 90 of its 141 total private dwellings, a change of 0% from its 2016 population of 213. With a land area of 0.55 km^{2} (0.21 sq mi), it had a population density of 387.3/km^{2} (1,003.0/sq mi) in 2021.

In the 2016 Census of Population conducted by Statistics Canada, the Summer Village of Jarvis Bay had a population of 213 living in 86 of its 136 total private dwellings, a 4.9% change from its 2011 population of 203. With a land area of 0.53 km^{2} (0.20 sq mi), it had a population density of 401.9/km^{2} (1,040.9/sq mi) in 2016.

== See also ==
- List of communities in Alberta
- List of francophone communities in Alberta
- List of summer villages in Alberta
- List of resort villages in Saskatchewan
