= Sylvan Lake Park =

Urban park (former provincial park) in Alberta

- Sylvan Lake Provincial Park (1980–2018)
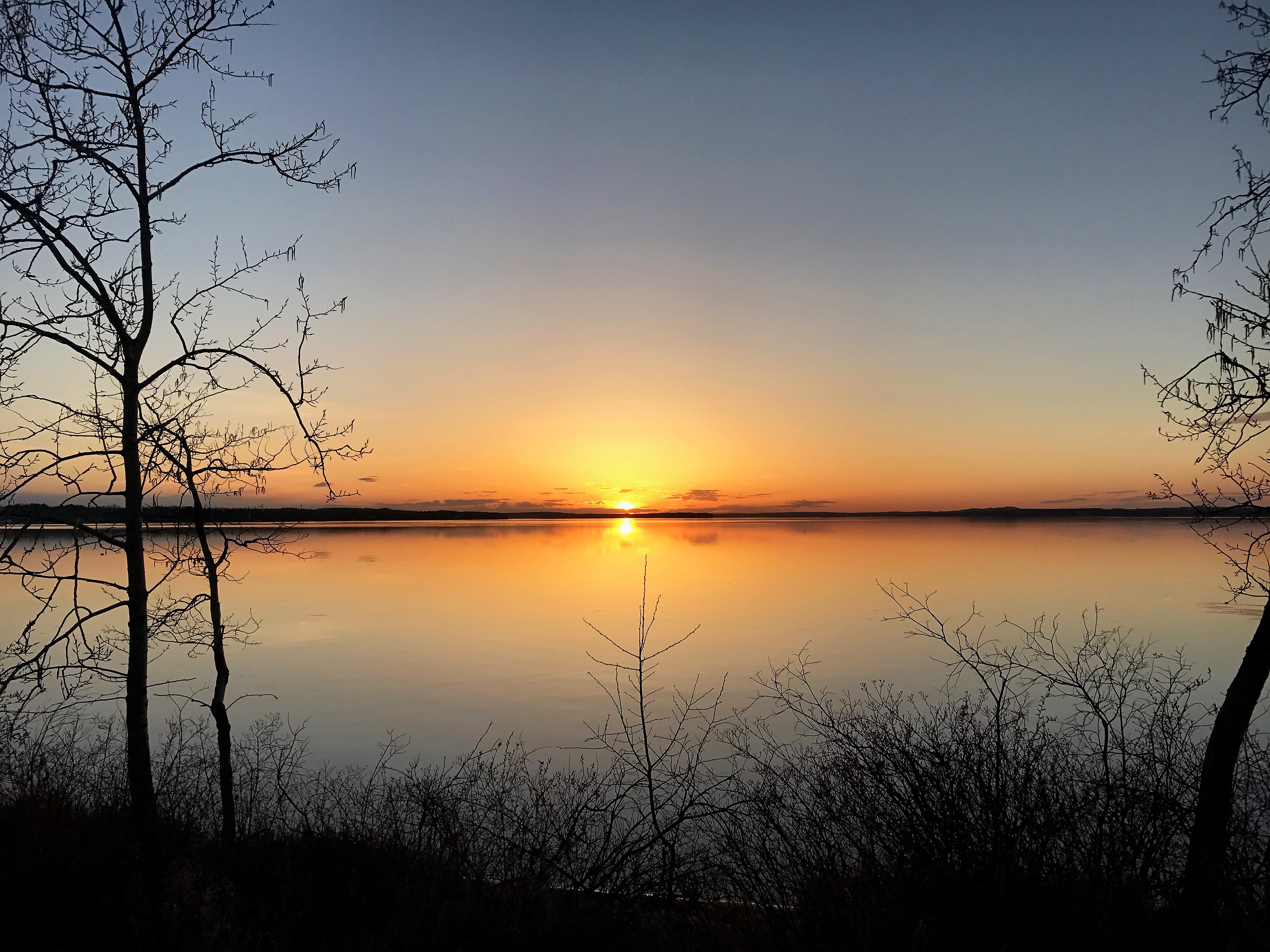
- Interactive map of Sylvan Lake Park
- Location: Sylvan Lake, Alberta
- Coordinates: 52°18′46″N 114°05′28″W
- Area: 67 ha (170 acres)
- Operator: Town of Sylvan Lake
- Visitors: 761,223 (in July and August on average)

Sylvan Lake Park, previously Sylvan Lake Provincial Park, is an urban park in the Town of Sylvan Lake on the southern shore of Sylvan Lake in central Alberta, Canada. Prior to early 2018, it existed a provincial park for 38 years until its ownership was transferred to the Town of Sylvan Lake. The park averages 761,223 visitors every July and August.

== History ==
The park was originally designated a provincial park in 1932 but was transferred to the Town of Sylvan Lake in the 1960s. It was redesignated a provincial park on January 16, 1980. Its designation was rescinded on January 17, 2018. Prior to its transfer back to the Town of Sylvan Lake, the provincial park was 67 ha (170 acres) in size. The Town renamed the park as Sylvan Lake Park after the transfer.

== See also ==
- List of Alberta provincial parks
- List of Canadian provincial parks
- List of National Parks of Canada
- Urban parks in Canada
