= Division No. 8, Alberta =

Census division in Canada

Coordinates: 52°16′N 113°48′W

Division No. 8
- Census division in Alberta
- Country: Canada
- Province: Alberta

Area
  - Total: 9,909 km^{2} (3,826 sq mi)

Population (2021)
  - Total: 213,470
  - Density: 21.54/km^{2} (55.80/sq mi)

Division No. 8 is a census division in Alberta, Canada. It is located in the south-central portion of central Alberta and includes the City of Red Deer and surrounding areas. The division forms the central segment of the Calgary–Edmonton Corridor. Division No. 8 is the smallest census division in Alberta according to area.

== Census subdivisions ==
The following census subdivisions (municipalities or municipal equivalents) are located within Alberta's Division No. 8.

- Cities
  - Lacombe
  - Red Deer
- Towns
  - Bentley
  - Blackfalds
  - Bowden
  - Eckville
  - Innisfail
  - Penhold
  - Ponoka
  - Rimbey
  - Sylvan Lake
- Villages
  - Alix
  - Clive
  - Delburne
  - Elnora
- Summer villages
  - Birchcliff
  - Gull Lake
  - Half Moon Bay
  - Jarvis Bay
  - Norglenwold
  - Parkland Beach
  - Sunbreaker Cove
- Municipal districts
  - Lacombe County
  - Ponoka County
  - Red Deer County
- Indian reserves
  - Montana 139
  - Samson 137
  - Samson 137A

== Demographics ==
Historical population
Year	Pop.	±%
1991	124,098	—
1996	133,592	+7.7%
2001	153,049	+14.6%
2006	175,337	+14.6%
2011	189,243	+7.9%
2016	209,395	+10.6%
2021	213,470	+1.9%

In the 2021 Census of Population conducted by Statistics Canada, Division No. 8 had a population of 213,470 living in 83,983 of its 92,439 total private dwellings, a change of 1.9% from its 2016 population of 209,395. With a land area of 9,890.05 km^{2} (3,818.57 sq mi), it had a population density of 21.6/km^{2} (55.9/sq mi) in 2021.

== See also ==
- List of census divisions of Alberta
- List of communities in Alberta
