= 2019 Alberta municipal censuses =

← 2018	April 1 – June 30, 2019	2020 →
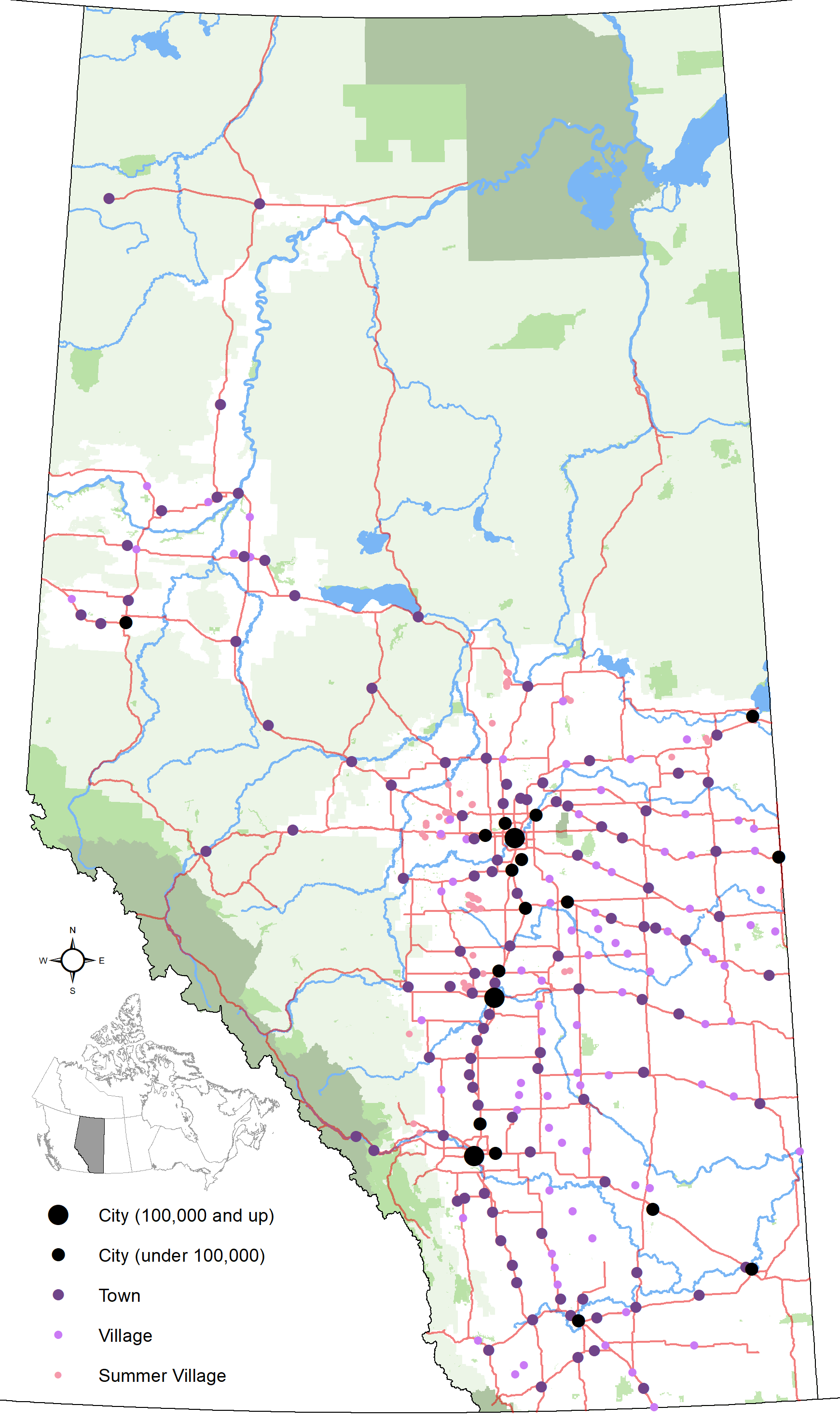
- Distribution of Alberta's 269 urban municipalities

Alberta has provincial legislation allowing its municipalities to conduct municipal censuses between April 1 and June 30 inclusive. Municipalities choose to conduct their own censuses for multiple reasons such as to better inform municipal service planning and provision, to capitalize on per capita based grant funding from higher levels of government, or to simply update their populations since the last federal census.

Alberta began the year of 2019 with 351 municipalities. Of these, at least 18 (5.1%) have published their intentions to conduct a municipal census in 2019.

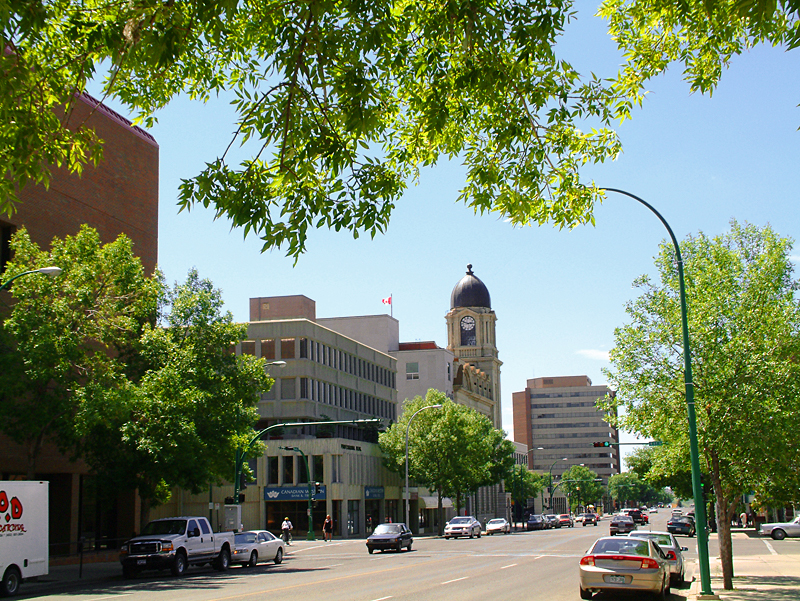
Lethbridge became the fourth city in Alberta to surpass a population of 100,000.

Some municipalities achieved population milestones as a result of their 2019 censuses. Lethbridge both exceeded 100,000 residents and surpassed Red Deer as Alberta's third largest city after counting 101,482 residents. Airdrie, now the fifth-largest city in the province after passing Grande Prairie (which last calculated its population in the 2018 Alberta municipal censuses), grew beyond the 70,000-mark.

== Municipal census results ==
The following summarizes the results of the numerous municipal censuses conducted in 2019.

2019 municipal census summary				2016 federal census comparison				Previous municipal census comparison			
Municipality	Status	Census date	2019 pop.	2016 pop.	Absolute growth	Absolute change	Annual growth rate	Prev. pop.	Prev. census year	Absolute growth	Annual growth rate
Airdrie	City	April 1, 2019	70,564	61,581	8,983	14.6%	4.6%	68,091	2018	2,473	3.6%
Beaumont	City	May 1, 2019	19,236	17,396	1,840	10.6%	3.4%	18,829	2018	407	2.2%
Calgary	City	April 1, 2019	1,285,711	1,239,220	46,491	3.8%	1.2%	1,267,344	2018	18,367	1.4%
Coaldale	Town	April 1, 2019	8,691	8,215	476	5.8%	1.9%	7,526	2013	1,165	2.4%
Coalhurst	Town	May 21, 2019	2,784	2,668	116	4.3%	1.4%	2,767	2018	17	0.6%
Cochrane	Town	April 1, 2019	29,277	25,853	3,424	13.2%	4.2%	27,960	2018	1,317	4.7%
Crossfield	Town	May 1, 2019	3,377	2,983	394	13.2%	4.2%	3,308	2018	69	2.1%
Edmonton	City	April 1, 2019	972,223	932,546	39,677	4.3%	1.4%	899,447	2016	72,776	2.6%
Fort Saskatchewan	City	April 1, 2019	26,942	24,149	2,793	11.6%	3.7%	26,328	2018	614	2.3%
Fox Creek	Town	June 3, 2019	2,189	1,971	218	11.1%	3.6%	2,112	2013	77	1.4%
High River	Town	April 1, 2019	14,052	13,584	468	3.4%	1.1%	11,783	2010	2,269	2.0%
Lac La Biche County	Specialized municipality	April 17, 2019	8,654	8,330	324	3.9%	1.3%	8,544	2016	110	0.4%
Lacombe	City	April 2, 2019	13,985	13,057	928	7.1%	2.3%	12,728	2014	1,257	1.9%
Leduc	City	April 1, 2019	33,032	29,993	3,039	10.1%	3.3%	32,448	2018	584	1.8%
MD of Lesser Slave River No. 124	Municipal district	May 1, 2019	2,811	2,803	8	0.3%	0.1%	3,074	2014	−263	−1.8%
Lethbridge	City	April 1, 2019	101,482	92,729	8,753	9.4%	3.1%	99,769	2018	1,713	1.7%
Penhold	Town	April 1, 2019	3,563	3,277	286	8.7%	2.8%	2,842	2014	721	4.6%
Raymond	Town	May 15, 2019	4,241	3,708	533	14.4%	4.6%	4,252	2018	−11	−0.3%
Red Deer	City	April 1, 2019	101,002	100,418	584	0.6%	0.2%	99,832	2016	1,170	0.4%
Stony Plain	Town	May 1, 2019	17,842	17,189	653	3.8%	1.3%	16,127	2015	1,715	2.6%
Sturgeon County	Municipal district	April 15, 2019	20,506	20,495	11	0.1%	0.0%	19,165	2008	1,341	0.6%

== Breakdowns ==
=== Hamlets ===
The following is a list of hamlet populations determined by 2019 municipal censuses conducted by Lac La Biche County and Sturgeon County.

2019 municipal census summary			Previous census comparison			
Hamlet	Municipality	2019 population	Previous population	Previous census year	Absolute growth	Annual growth rate
Alcomdale	Sturgeon County		50	2008		
Beaver Lake	Lac La Biche County	501	527	2016	−26	−1.7%
Calahoo	Sturgeon County		210	2008		
Carbondale	Sturgeon County			2008		
Cardiff	Sturgeon County		1,190	2008		
Hylo	Lac La Biche County	31	33	2016	−2	−2.1%
Lac La Biche	Lac La Biche County	2,837	2,682	2016	155	1.9%
Lamoureux	Sturgeon County			2008		
Mearns	Sturgeon County			2008		
Namao	Sturgeon County		10	2008		
Pine Sands	Sturgeon County			2008		
Plamondon	Lac La Biche County	373	348	2016	25	2.3%
Riviere Qui Barre	Sturgeon County		100	2008		
Venice	Lac La Biche County	17	22	2016	−5	−8.2%
Villeneuve	Sturgeon County		225	2008		

== See also ==
- List of communities in Alberta
