= Sandy Lake (Alberta) =

Lake in Alberta, Canada

- Location within Alberta
- Location: Lac Ste. Anne County / Sturgeon County, Alberta
- Coordinates: 53°47′15″N 114°02′29″W
- Primary inflows: Intermittent stream
- Primary outflows: Rare intermittent stream into Sturgeon River
- Basin countries: Canada
- Max. length: 4.8 km (3.0 mi)
- Max. width: 2.9 km (1.8 mi)
- Surface area: 11.4 km^{2} (4.4 sq mi)
- Average depth: 2.6 m (8 ft 6 in)
- Max. depth: 4.4 m (14 ft)
- Surface elevation: 697 m (2,287 ft)
- References: Sandy Lake

Sandy Lake is a lake in Alberta. The lake is situated 55 km northwest of Edmonton in the County of Lac Ste. Anne and the Municipal District of Sturgeon. It is located near Morinville. Sandy Beach, Sunrise Beach, Pine Sands, the Sandy Lake Wilderness Area and the Alexander Indian Reserve are all situated on the lake's shoreline. Sportfish include Yellow Perch and Northern Pike. Alberta Highway 642 crosses the lake.
