= Greater St. Albert Catholic Schools =

School district in Alberta, Canada

Greater St. Albert Catholic Schools Greater St. Albert Roman Catholic Separate School district No. 734

Location
- 6 St. Vital Avenue; St. Albert, Alberta, Canada Canada
- Coordinates: 53°38′14″N 113°37′57″W

District information
- Superintendent: David Keohane
- Chair of the board: Rosaleen McEvoy
- Schools: 16
- Budget: CA$70.2 million (2012/2013)

Students and staff
- Students: 6,200

Other information
- Elected trustees: Dave Caron; Joan Crockett; Jacquie Hansen; Rosaleen McEvoy; Cathy Proulx; Noreen Radford; Lauri-Ann Turnbull
- Website: www.gsacrd.ab.ca

Greater St. Albert Catholic Schools or Greater St. Albert Roman Catholic Separate School District No. 734 is a separate school board serving St. Albert, Morinville, and Legal, Alberta, Canada.

== Quick facts ==
- Greater St. Albert Catholic Schools formed in 1995 after the amalgamation of three historic school jurisdictions. It is 4th largest Catholic jurisdiction in Alberta.
- Greater St. Albert Catholic Schools was the first jurisdiction to offer a cyber school. St. Gabriel High School marked 14 years of success providing online learning opportunities for Alberta and overseas students.
- Greater St. Albert Catholic Schools was the first jurisdiction in Alberta to offer the Learning Through the Arts program developed by the Royal Conservatory of Music.

2013 - 2014 School Year

- Superintendent: Mr. David Keohane
- Schools: 16 located in 3 municipalities (Morinville, Legal & St. Albert) with 1 outreach location (St. Albert)
- Students: 6000
- Teachers: 378 (371 in schools + 7 in district operations)
- Total Staff: 579 (552 in schools + 27 in district operations)
- Trustees: 7 (4 in St. Albert; 2 in Morinville; and 1 in Legal)
- Board Chair: Mrs. Joan Crockett
- Budget: $67.2 million

== Board of trustees ==
- Vacant – St. Albert Ward
- Joan Crockett – St. Albert Ward,
- Serena Shaw – St. Albert Ward
- Rosaleen McEvoy – St. Albert Ward, Vice Chair
- Cathy Proulx - Legal Ward
- Noreen Radford – Morinville Ward, Board Chair
- Rene Tremblay – Morinville Ward

== Programs ==
- Kindergarten
- Pre-Kindergarten
- Faith Education
- French Immersion
- International Baccalaureate (IB)
- Learning Through the Arts
- Sports Academy

== Schools ==
- Legal School, Legal (PK-9)

=== Morinville ===
- École Notre Dame Elementary (PK-5)
- École Georges H. Primeau Middle School (6-8)
- Morinville Community High School (9-12)
- St. Kateri Tekakwitha Academy (PK-5)

=== St. Albert ===
- Albert Lacombe Catholic School (PK-6)
- Bertha Kennedy Catholic School (PK-6)
- École Sacré Coeur (PK-4)
- École Sainte Marguerite d’Youville (5-9)
- École Secondaire St. Albert Catholic High School (10-12)
- Holy Family Catholic School (PK-6)
- J.J. Nearing Catholic School (PK-6)
- Neil M. Ross Catholic School (PK-6)
- Richard S. Fowler Catholic Junior High School (7-9)
- Sister Alphonse Academy (PK-9)
- St. Gabriel Education Centre (10-12)
- Vincent J. Maloney Catholic Junior High School (7-9)

== Alleged human rights violations ==
In October 2009, it was reported that Jan Buterman, a former employee of the district, had filed a human rights complaint against the district. Buterman claimed that he had been removed from the district's substitute teaching list in 2008 after he declared his intention to transition from a female to male. In a letter to Buterman dated October 14, 2008, the division's deputy superintendent, Steve Bayus, stated "Since you made a personal choice to change your gender, which is contrary to Catholic teachings, we have had to remove you from the substitute teacher list." As of October 15, 2009, the Alberta Human Rights Commission had accepted Buterman's complaint.

== 2011 Morinville controversy ==
The Town of Morinville has only a public Catholic high school (part of the Greater St. Albert Catholic Regional Division), and no secular or Protestant high schools, though the surrounding Sturgeon County, is a part of the public Sturgeon School Division. In 2011, this led non-Catholic parents to start an advocacy campaign to secularize education in Morinville.
