= Morinville Community High School =

Location
- 9506-100 Ave. Morinville, Alberta, T8R 1P6; Canada; 53.80301°N 113.63576°W

Information
- School type: Catholic
- Motto: Perficimus (We Achieve))
- Founded: 1994
- School board: Greater St. Albert Catholic Schools
- Principal: Don Hinks
- Grades: 9-12
- Enrollment: 623 (May 5, 2011))
- Language: English and French
- Colours: Orange, Blue and White
- Mascot: Big Bad Joe
- Team name: Wolves or Prairie Wolves
- Website: www.mchs.gsacrd.ab.ca

Morinville Community High School (MCHS) is a Catholic high school located in Morinville, Alberta, Canada. It is part of the Greater St. Albert Catholic Schools. MCHS is the only high school serving the Morinville community.

The school was founded in November 1994 and teaches students from grade 9-12. Their athletic teams are called the "Prairie Wolves," or just the "Wolves."

== History ==
Previously, Morinville was served by high schools in neighbouring towns: the older and larger settlement of St. Albert to the south, and the small agricultural village of Legal to the north. The Grey Nuns had established a small convent, schoolhouse, and hospital in what became St. Albert in 1864. The Catholic Church continued to dominate education in the region even after the first public school boards were formed, as most of the population was Catholic. In the earliest days, each school had its own board, and St. Albert had a school board as early as 1885 when the St. Albert Roman Catholic Public District no. 3 and nearby Bellerose Roman Catholic Public District no. 6 were formed to operate one-room schools that went up to grade 8, the legal requirement at the time (Bellerose School was later moved to Fort Edmonton Park, where it still stands).

The first school district founded in the Morinville area was the Thibault Roman Catholic School Public District. The school was named after the founder, Father Thibault, who started a mission and a school in 1892. Nearby Legal, Alberta got its school district in 1907, and later a secondary school: St. Emile High School.

For several decades, Morinville maintained an elementary school in town, with high schools to the north and south. In 1980, French immersion was officially offered in the Morinville schools, reversing decades of "English-only" policy in what hadoriginally been a Francophone settlement.

In 1993, Legal's St. Emile High School closed. The Thibault School District opened Morinville Community High School on November 3, 1994. The first principal of MCHS was Paul O’Dea.

On January 1, 1995, the three main schools in Legal and Morinville were joined into the Greater St. Albert Catholic Regional Division or GSACRD as part of a wave of school board consolidations across Alberta at that time.

When MCHS was first opened, the grade 9 hallway was not part of the school. It was added later when the number of grade 9 students in G.H. Primeau School was too high.

== Courses and programs ==
Morinville Community High School offers many different Courses, including all courses required by the Province of Alberta, plus a wide selection of options. It also provides programs called iLearn and RAP. Quite a few of these courses are offered in French as well.

=== Core program ===
The core studies include Mathematics, English/Language Arts, Social Studies, Science (including Biology, Chemistry, Physics and Forensic Science), and French immersion.

=== Optional studies ===
Students are provided the option to study

- Art
- Drama
- Computer Graphics
  - Media and Communications
  - MCTV
- Music
  - Band
  - Chorus
  - Guitar
  - Instrumental instruction
- Construction
- Home Economics
  - Foods
  - Fashion
  - Cafeteria prep
- Early Child Care
- Cosmetology
- French language
- Leadership
- Religion
- Film Studies
- Legal Studies
- Medical Studies
- Sports
  - Sport Medicine
- Learning Strategies
- Work experience

== Athletics ==
=== Western Canadian Challenge ===
The Western Canadian Challenge (WCC) is an annual volleyball tournament that is hosted each October by Morinville Community High School. The tournament's sponsors are ASICS, Pepsi, United Cycle, Mizuno, and the Morinville Lions Club. The tournament has been every year since 1995, and has hosted as many as 96 teams from all over Canada and the United States, as well as a few teams from other countries.

=== School mascot ===
The school teams play under the name "The Prairie Wolves" or simply "The Wolves". The school mascot is a wolf named Big Bad Joe.

=== Team sports ===
MCHS supports teams in the following sports:

- Volleyball
- Basketball
- Badminton
- Curling
- Golf
- Track and field teams
- Cross Country
- Cheerleading (Stunt)

=== Intramural sports ===
MCHS Moriniville community high school offers a number of intramural sports as well. These vary from year to year, and have included:

- Floor Hockey
- Basketball
- Soccer

== Student activities ==
MCHS offers students a variety of extracurricular activities:

- Student Council
- Students Against Drinking and Driving
- Drum Circle
- Garbage Crew
- Yearbook Committee
- Interact Club (a student-organized charitable works group)
- MCTV (a TV show inside the school run by students and Greg Boutestein)

== Arts ==
Drama

MCHS annually produces a musical drawn from the standard Broadway repertory.

Coffee House

Students may partake in an annual "coffee house" style talent show.

Other arts

MCHS hosts a band, chorus, and jazz ensemble.
