= Lower Manor Estates, Alberta =

Unincorporated community in Alberta, Canada

Lower Manor Estates
- Designated place
- Location of Lower Manor Estates Lower Manor Estates (Canada)
- Coordinates: 53.681°N 113.558°W
- Country: Canada
- Province: Alberta
- Region: Edmonton Metropolitan Region
- Census division: 11
- Municipal district: Sturgeon County

Government
  - Type: Unincorporated
  - Governing body: Sturgeon County Council

Area (2021)
  - Land: 0.5 km^{2} (0.19 sq mi)

Population (2021)
  - Total: 65
  - Density: 129.8/km^{2} (336/sq mi)
- Time zone: UTC−06:00 (Alberta Time)
- Area codes: 780, 587, 825

Lower Manor Estates is an unincorporated community in Alberta, Canada within Sturgeon County that is recognized as a designated place by Statistics Canada. It is located on the north side of Township Road 543A (Sturgeon Road), 3.5 km (2.2 mi) west of Highway 28. It is adjacent to the designated places of Bristol Oakes to the west and Upper and Lower Viscount Estates to the south.

== Demographics ==
In the 2021 Census of Population conducted by Statistics Canada, Lower Manor Estates had a population of 65 living in 31 of its 32 total private dwellings, a change of −17.7% from its 2016 population of 79. With a land area of 0.5 km^{2} (0.19 sq mi), it had a population density of 130.0/km^{2} (336.7/sq mi) in 2021.

As a designated place in the 2016 Census of Population conducted by Statistics Canada, Lower Manor Estates had a population of 79 living in 33 of its 33 total private dwellings, a change of −9.2% from its 2011 population of 87. With a land area of 0.5 km^{2} (0.19 sq mi), it had a population density of 158.0/km^{2} (409.2/sq mi) in 2016.

== See also ==
- List of communities in Alberta
- List of designated places in Alberta
