= Paul Lorieau =

Canadian optician and anthem singer (1942–2013)

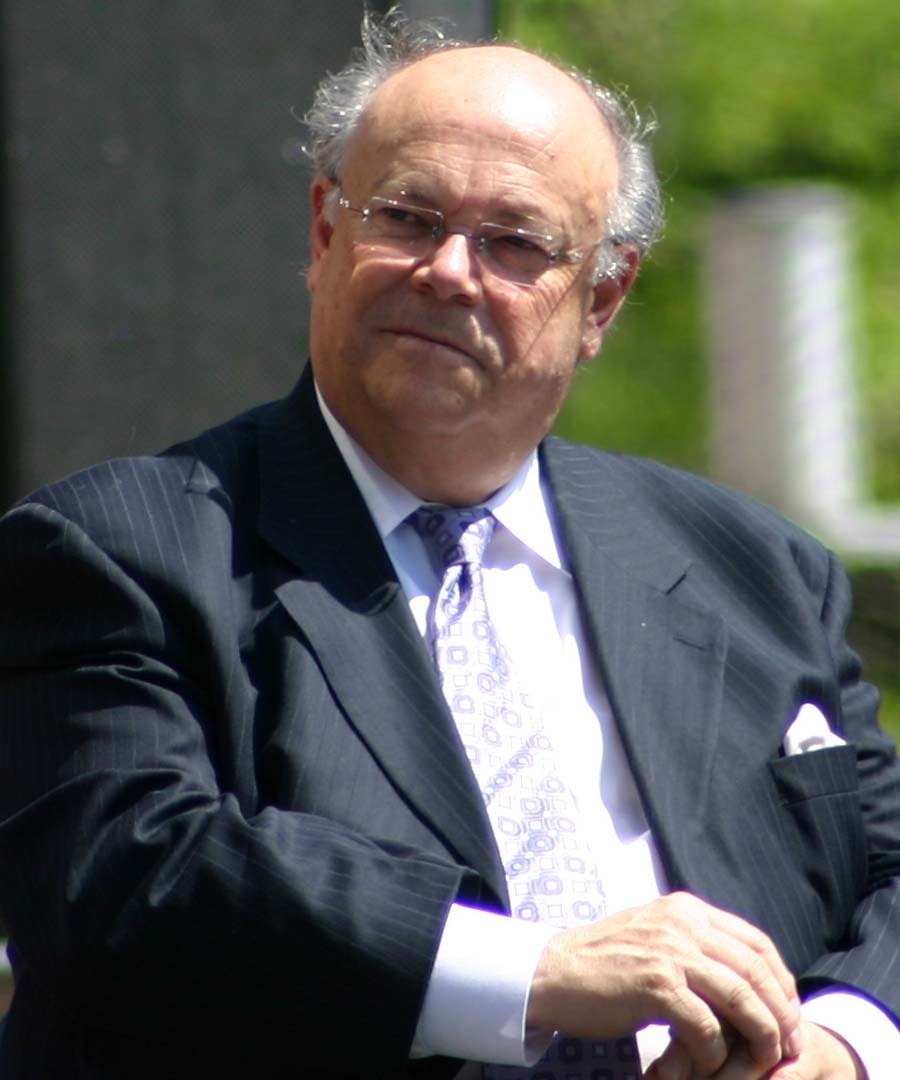
- Lorieau in 2006
- Born: June 29, 1942; Legal, Alberta, Canada
- Died: July 2, 2013 (aged 71); Edmonton, Alberta, Canada
- Occupations: Optician, opera singer
- Known for: Anthem singer for the Edmonton Oilers (1981–2011)
- Children: Four daughters: Lisa, Jocelyne, Danielle and Camille and five grandchildren: Alyssa, Brianna, Matteo, Mark and Alexa.

Paul Joseph Lorieau (June 29, 1942 – July 2, 2013) was a Canadian optician who was the national anthem singer for the Edmonton Oilers of the National Hockey League from 1981 to 2011. He was of French-Canadian descent. His paternal grandparents were born in Vendée, France: his grandfather Jean Lorieau in the village of La Grossière in Boulogne in 1868, and his grandmother Célestine Auneau in the village of La Chaunière in Saint-Fulgent in 1868.

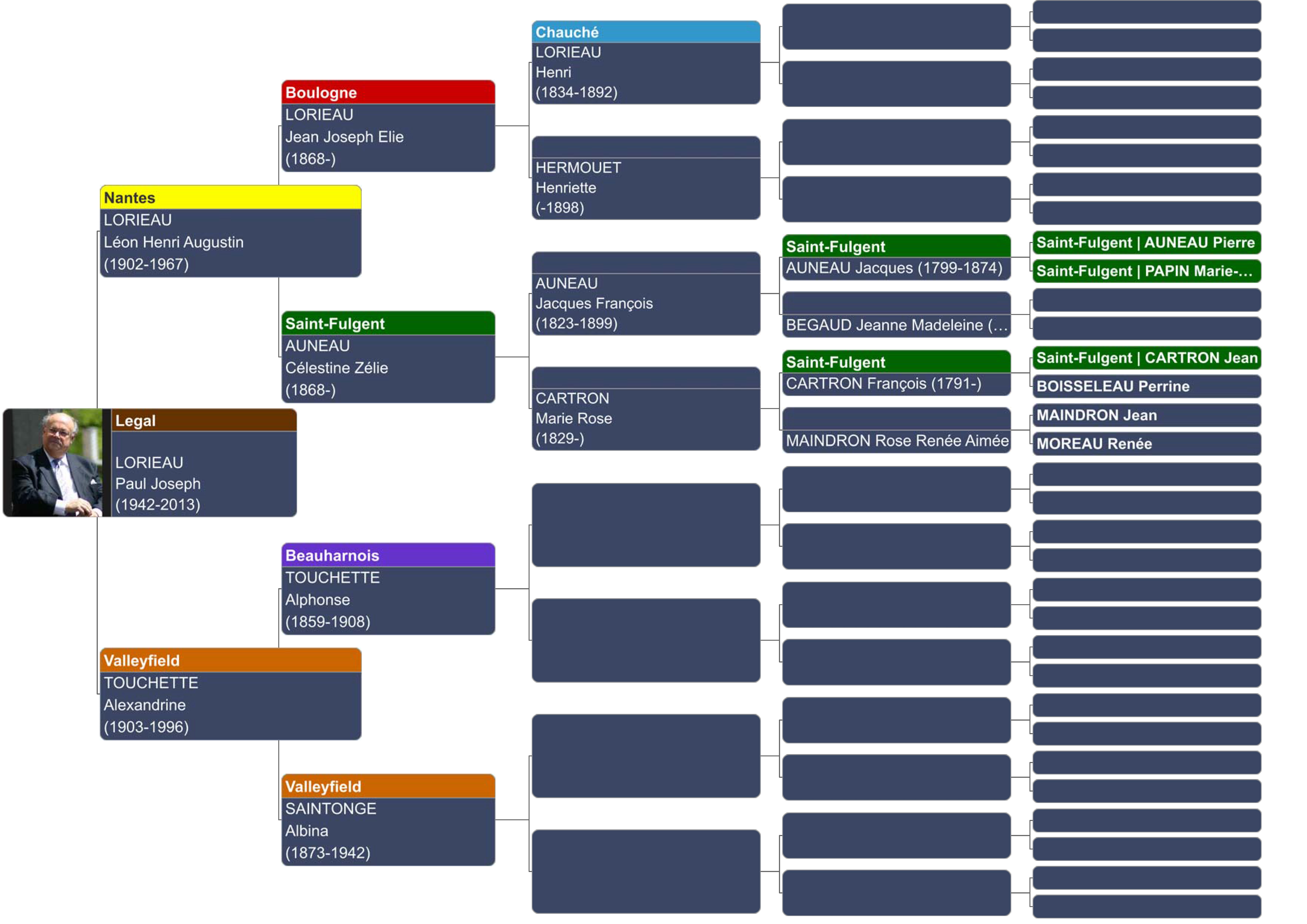
Ascendance Paul Lorieau

Lorieau was born the youngest of 7 children on June 29, 1942 in Legal, Alberta to Henri and Alexandrine Lorieau. Both of his parents had musical backgrounds, his mother playing the violin, and his father a "natural tenor". Around 1981 Lorieau had sent in an audition tape in a search for a new anthem singer in Edmonton at the request of Oilers media relations director Bill Tuele. Although the anthem singer at the time had already been selected, the tape from Lorieau, which had been sent in late as he had been in New York City at the time, had been considered and he ultimately ended up being given the job.

In response to the Canadian National Anthem being booed at the beginning of Game 5 of the 2006 NHL Western Conference Semifinals in San Jose, when playing the next game in Edmonton, the Canadian crowd responded in their own fashion. At the beginning of Game 3 between the Mighty Ducks of Anaheim and the Oilers, he sang only a few lines of "O Canada" before letting the audience sing the rest of the song without him. This was done at all remaining Oilers home games throughout the rest of the 2006 playoffs, which included the Oilers appearance in the Stanley Cup Finals, and even at the first few Oilers home games at the beginning of the 2006–07 NHL season.

On March 23, 2011, Lorieau announced that he would retire at the end of the season. On April 8, 2011 when the Oilers played their final home game of the regular season, he performed in front of a sold-out Rexall Place one final time. A special pre-game ceremony was held to honour the Oilers longest-standing anthem singer and to give Oil Country a chance to salute Paul for 30 great years.

Upon Lorieau's retirement, there was no official replacement for the Oilers' national anthem singer position until 2013, when Robert Clark was named as the singing voice of the Edmonton Oilers.

On July 2, 2013, Lorieau died in hospice of metastatic esophageal cancer, surrounded by his family.
