= Hewitt Estates, Alberta =

Hewitt Estates
- Designated place
- Location of Hewitt Estates Hewitt Estates (Canada)
- Coordinates: 53.808°N 113.406°W
- Country: Canada
- Province: Alberta
- Region: Edmonton Metropolitan Region
- Census division: 11
- Municipal district: Sturgeon County

Government
  - Type: Unincorporated
  - Governing body: Sturgeon County Council

Area (2021)
  - Land: 1.23 km^{2} (0.47 sq mi)

Population (2021)
  - Total: 149
  - Density: 121.1/km^{2} (314/sq mi)
- Time zone: UTC−06:00 (Alberta Time)
- Area codes: 780, 587, 825

Hewitt Estates is an unincorporated community in Alberta, Canada within Sturgeon County that is recognized as a designated place by Statistics Canada. It is located on Range Road 235, 2.4 km (1.5 mi) south of Highway 28.

== Demographics ==
In the 2021 Census of Population conducted by Statistics Canada, Hewitt Estates had a population of 149 living in 61 of its 66 total private dwellings, a change of −14.4% from its 2016 population of 174. With a land area of 1.23 km^{2} (0.47 sq mi), it had a population density of 121.1/km^{2} (313.7/sq mi) in 2021.

As a designated place in the 2016 Census of Population conducted by Statistics Canada, Hewitt Estates had a population of 174 living in 65 of its 65 total private dwellings, a change of 79.4% from its 2011 population of 97. With a land area of 1.23 km^{2} (0.47 sq mi), it had a population density of 141.5/km^{2} (366.4/sq mi) in 2016.

== See also ==
- List of communities in Alberta
- List of designated places in Alberta
