= Glory Hills, Alberta =

Glory Hills
- Designated place
- Location of Glory Hills Glory Hills (Canada)
- Coordinates: 53.683°N 113.971°W
- Country: Canada
- Province: Alberta
- Region: Edmonton Metropolitan Region
- Census division: 11
- Municipal district: Sturgeon County

Government
  - Type: Unincorporated
  - Governing body: Sturgeon County Council

Area (2021)
  - Land: 1.43 km^{2} (0.55 sq mi)

Population (2021)
  - Total: 195
  - Density: 136.6/km^{2} (354/sq mi)
- Time zone: UTC−06:00 (Alberta Time)
- Area codes: 780, 587, 825

Glory Hills is an unincorporated community in Alberta, Canada within Sturgeon County that is recognized as a designated place by Statistics Canada. It is located on the south side of Township Road 544, 1.2 km (0.75 mi) east of Highway 779.

== Demographics ==
In the 2021 Census of Population conducted by Statistics Canada, Glory Hills had a population of 195 living in 69 of its 79 total private dwellings, a change of −20.1% from its 2016 population of 244. With a land area of 1.43 km^{2} (0.55 sq mi), it had a population density of 136.4/km^{2} (353.2/sq mi) in 2021.

As a designated place in the 2016 Census of Population conducted by Statistics Canada, Glory Hills had a population of 244 living in 82 of its 83 total private dwellings, a change of 18.4% from its 2011 population of 206. With a land area of 1.43 km^{2} (0.55 sq mi), it had a population density of 170.6/km^{2} (441.9/sq mi) in 2016.

== See also ==
- List of communities in Alberta
- List of designated places in Alberta
