= Upper Manor Estates, Alberta =

Upper Manor Estates
- Designated place
- Location of Upper Manor Estates Upper Manor Estates (Canada)
- Coordinates: 53.692°N 113.582°W
- Country: Canada
- Province: Alberta
- Region: Edmonton Metropolitan Region
- Census division: 11
- Municipal district: Sturgeon County

Government
  - Type: Unincorporated
  - Governing body: Sturgeon County Council

Area (2021)
  - Land: 1.75 km^{2} (0.68 sq mi)

Population (2021)
  - Total: 718
  - Density: 411.2/km^{2} (1,065/sq mi)
- Time zone: UTC−06:00 (Alberta Time)
- Area codes: 780, 587, 825

Upper Manor Estates is an unincorporated community in Alberta, Canada within Sturgeon County that is recognized as a designated place by Statistics Canada. It is located on the west side of Range Road 251 (Starkey Road), 2.0 km (1.2 mi) south of Highway 37. It is adjacent to the designated place of Bristol Oakes to the southeast.

== Demographics ==
In the 2021 Census of Population conducted by Statistics Canada, Upper Manor Estates had a population of 718 living in 244 of its 277 total private dwellings, a change of 9.5% from its 2016 population of 656. With a land area of 1.75 km^{2} (0.68 sq mi), it had a population density of 410.3/km^{2} (1,062.6/sq mi) in 2021.

As a designated place in the 2016 Census of Population conducted by Statistics Canada, Upper Manor Estates had a population of 656 living in 192 of its 203 total private dwellings, a change of −7.6% from its 2011 population of 710. With a land area of 1.74 km^{2} (0.67 sq mi), it had a population density of 377.0/km^{2} (976.5/sq mi) in 2016.

== See also ==
- List of communities in Alberta
- List of designated places in Alberta
