= Hu Haven, Alberta =

Hu Haven
- Designated place
- Location of Hu Haven Hu Haven (Canada)
- Coordinates: 53.770°N 113.205°W
- Country: Canada
- Province: Alberta
- Region: Edmonton Metropolitan Region
- Census division: 11
- Municipal district: Sturgeon County

Government
  - Type: Unincorporated
  - Governing body: Sturgeon County Council

Area (2021)
  - Land: 0.65 km^{2} (0.25 sq mi)

Population (2021)
  - Total: 118
  - Density: 182.4/km^{2} (472/sq mi)
- Time zone: UTC−06:00 (Alberta Time)
- Area codes: 780, 587, 825

Hu Haven is an unincorporated community in Alberta, Canada within Sturgeon County that is recognized as a designated place by Statistics Canada. It is located on the south side of Township Road 554, 0.8 km (0.50 mi) east of Highway 825.

== Demographics ==
In the 2021 Census of Population conducted by Statistics Canada, Hu Haven had a population of 118 living in 44 of its 47 total private dwellings, a change of −4.1% from its 2016 population of 123. With a land area of 0.65 km^{2} (0.25 sq mi), it had a population density of 181.5/km^{2} (470.2/sq mi) in 2021.

As a designated place in the 2016 Census of Population conducted by Statistics Canada, Hu Haven had a population of 123 living in 46 of its 46 total private dwellings, a change of 4.2% from its 2011 population of 118. With a land area of 0.66 km^{2} (0.25 sq mi), it had a population density of 186.4/km^{2} (482.7/sq mi) in 2016.

== See also ==
- List of communities in Alberta
- List of designated places in Alberta
