= Upper and Lower Viscount Estates, Alberta =

Upper and Lower Viscount Estates
- Designated place
- Location of Upper and Lower Viscount Estates Upper and Lower Viscount Estates (Canada)
- Coordinates: 53.676°N 113.560°W
- Country: Canada
- Province: Alberta
- Region: Edmonton Metropolitan Region
- Census division: 11
- Municipal district: Sturgeon County

Government
  - Type: Unincorporated
  - Governing body: Sturgeon County Council

Area (2021)
  - Land: 0.57 km^{2} (0.22 sq mi)

Population (2021)
  - Total: 120
  - Density: 212.2/km^{2} (550/sq mi)
- Time zone: UTC−06:00 (Alberta Time)
- Area codes: 780, 587, 825

Upper and Lower Viscount Estates is an unincorporated community in Alberta, Canada within Sturgeon County that is recognized as a designated place by Statistics Canada. It is located on the south side of Township Road 543A (Sturgeon Road), 3 km (1.9 mi) west of Highway 28. It is adjacent to the designated places of Bristol Oakes to the north and Lower Manor Estates to the north.

== Demographics ==
In the 2021 Census of Population conducted by Statistics Canada, Upper and Lower Viscount Estates had a population of 120 living in 42 of its 51 total private dwellings, a change of −43.9% from its 2016 population of 214. With a land area of 0.57 km^{2} (0.22 sq mi), it had a population density of 210.5/km^{2} (545.3/sq mi) in 2021.

As a designated place in the 2016 Census of Population conducted by Statistics Canada, Upper and Lower Viscount Estates had a population of 214 living in 72 of its 74 total private dwellings, a change of 0% from its 2011 population of 214. With a land area of 0.68 km^{2} (0.26 sq mi), it had a population density of 314.7/km^{2} (815.1/sq mi) in 2016.

== See also ==
- List of communities in Alberta
- List of designated places in Alberta
