= Bristol Oakes, Alberta =

Bristol Oakes
- Designated place
- Location of Bristol Oakes Bristol Oakes (Canada)
- Coordinates: 53.682°N 113.565°W
- Country: Canada
- Province: Alberta
- Region: Edmonton Metropolitan Region
- Census division: 11
- Municipal district: Sturgeon County

Government
  - Type: Unincorporated
  - Governing body: Sturgeon County Council

Area (2021)
  - Land: 0.32 km^{2} (0.12 sq mi)

Population (2021)
  - Total: 240
  - Density: 742.8/km^{2} (1,924/sq mi)
- Time zone: UTC−06:00 (Alberta Time)
- Area codes: 780, 587, 825

Bristol Oakes is an unincorporated community in Alberta, Canada within Sturgeon County that is recognized as a designated place by Statistics Canada. It is located on the east side of Range Road 251 (Starkey Road), 3.5 km (2.2 mi) south of Highway 37. It is adjacent to the designated places of Lower Manor Estates to the east, Upper and Lower Viscount Estates to the south, and Upper Manor Estates to the northwest.

== Demographics ==
In the 2021 Census of Population conducted by Statistics Canada, Bristol Oakes had a population of 240 living in 82 of its 83 total private dwellings, a change of −0.8% from its 2016 population of 242. With a land area of 0.32 km^{2} (0.12 sq mi), it had a population density of 750.0/km^{2} (1,942.5/sq mi) in 2021.

As a designated place in the 2016 Census of Population conducted by Statistics Canada, Bristol Oakes had a population of 242 living in 76 of its 77 total private dwellings, a change of −17.1% from its 2011 population of 292. With a land area of 0.32 km^{2} (0.12 sq mi), it had a population density of 756.3/km^{2} (1,958.7/sq mi) in 2016.

== See also ==
- List of communities in Alberta
- List of designated places in Alberta
