= Cardiff, Alberta =

Cardiff Cardiff Estates Cardiff-Echoes and Cardiff-Pittsburgh
- Hamlet
- Location of Cardiff Cardiff (Canada)
- Coordinates: 53°46′22″N 113°36′00″W
- Country: Canada
- Province: Alberta
- Region: Edmonton Metropolitan Region
- Census division: 11
- Municipal district: Sturgeon County

Government
  - Type: Unincorporated
  - Governing body: Sturgeon County Council

Area (2021)
  - Land: 0.98 km^{2} (0.38 sq mi)

Population (2021)
  - Total: 1,033
  - Density: 1,056.2/km^{2} (2,736/sq mi)
- Time zone: UTC−06:00 (Alberta Time)
- Area codes: 780, 587, 825

Cardiff is a hamlet in central Alberta, Canada within Sturgeon County. It is located 3 kilometres (1.9 mi) east of Highway 2, approximately 15 kilometres (9.3 mi) north of Edmonton's city limits. The Town of Morinville is 1.6 kilometres (0.99 mi) to the west of Cardiff.

== History ==
It was named after the prominent coal-mining centre of Cardiff, Wales, due to the large number of coal mines in the area.

Cardiff's coal mines were the scene of violent strikes in 1922. Cardiff's shipping trade in 1912 was the largest on record for the community, with approximately 12,500,000 tons in trade. Imports exceeded 2,000,000 tons while exports were 10,400,000.

== Demographics ==
Population history of Cardiff
Year	Pop.	±%
1911	246	—
1951	47	−80.9%
1956	71	+51.1%
1961	67	−5.6%
1966	40	−40.3%
1971	57	+42.5%
1976	53	−7.0%
1981	441	+732.1%
1986	490	+11.1%
1991	663	+35.3%
1996	995	+50.1%
2001	1,123	+12.9%
2006	1,160	+3.3%
2016	1,167	+0.6%
2021	1,033	−11.5%
Population counts for 1981 through 1991 are the sum of the counts for Cardiff-Echoes and Cardiff-Pittsburgh. The two were combined and reported as Cardiff Estates in 1996 and 2001. Population count for 2006 is the sum of the 20 census dissemination blocks that comprise the 2001 designated place boundary of Cardiff Estates. Source: Statistics Canada

In the 2021 Census of Population conducted by Statistics Canada, Cardiff had a population of 1,033 living in 379 of its 395 total private dwellings, a change of −11.5% from its 2016 population of 1,167. With a land area of 0.98 km^{2} (0.38 sq mi), it had a population density of 1,054.1/km^{2} (2,730.1/sq mi) in 2021.

== See also ==
- List of communities in Alberta
- List of hamlets in Alberta
