= Morinville =

- Town
- Town of Morinville
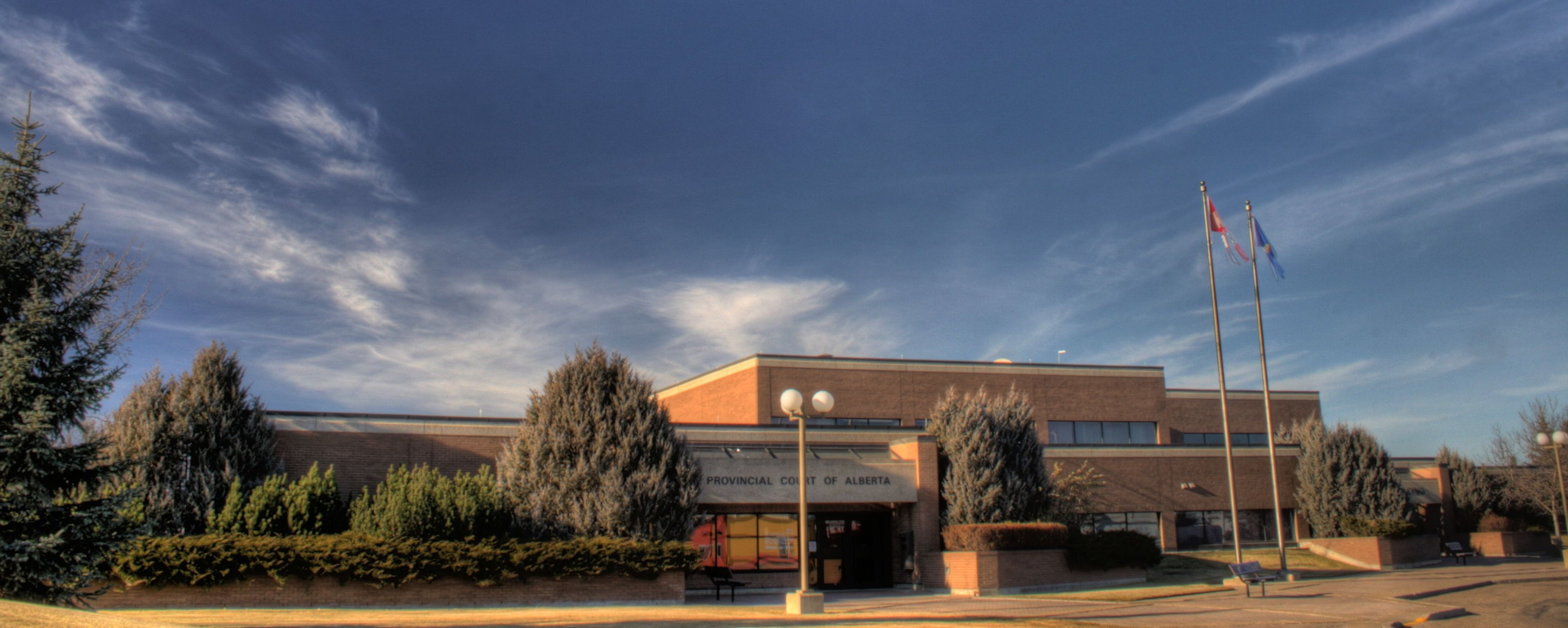
- The Provincial Building in downtown Morinville

- Coat of arms Logo
- Motto: "We Listen, We Serve, We Achieve"
- Location in Sturgeon County Location in Alberta
- Coordinates: 53°48′08″N 113°38′59″W
- Country: Canada
- Province: Alberta
- Region: Edmonton Metropolitan Region
- Census division: 11
- Municipal district: Sturgeon County
- Founded: 1892
- Incorporated
  - Village: August 24, 1901
  - Town: April 18, 1911
- Named for: Jean-Baptiste Morin

Government
  - Mayor: Simon Boersma
  - Governing body: Morinville Town Council: Maurice St.Denis; Stephen Dafoe; Rebecca Balanko; Jenn Anheliger; Ray White; Scott Richardson
  - CAO: Naleen Narayan
  - MP: Michael Cooper
  - MLA: Dale Nally

Area (2021)
  - Land: 11.15 km^{2} (4.31 sq mi)
- Elevation: 700 m (2,300 ft)

Population (2021)
  - Total: 10,385
  - Density: 931/km^{2} (2,410/sq mi)
  - Municipal census (2020): 10,578
  - Estimate (2020): 10,571
- Demonym: Morinvillager
- Time zone: UTC−06:00 (Alberta Time)
- Forward sortation area: T8R
- Area codes: 780, 587, 825
- Website: morinville.ca

Morinville is a town in the Edmonton Metropolitan Region of Alberta, Canada. It is approximately 34 kilometres (21 mi) north of Edmonton along Highway 2.

== History ==
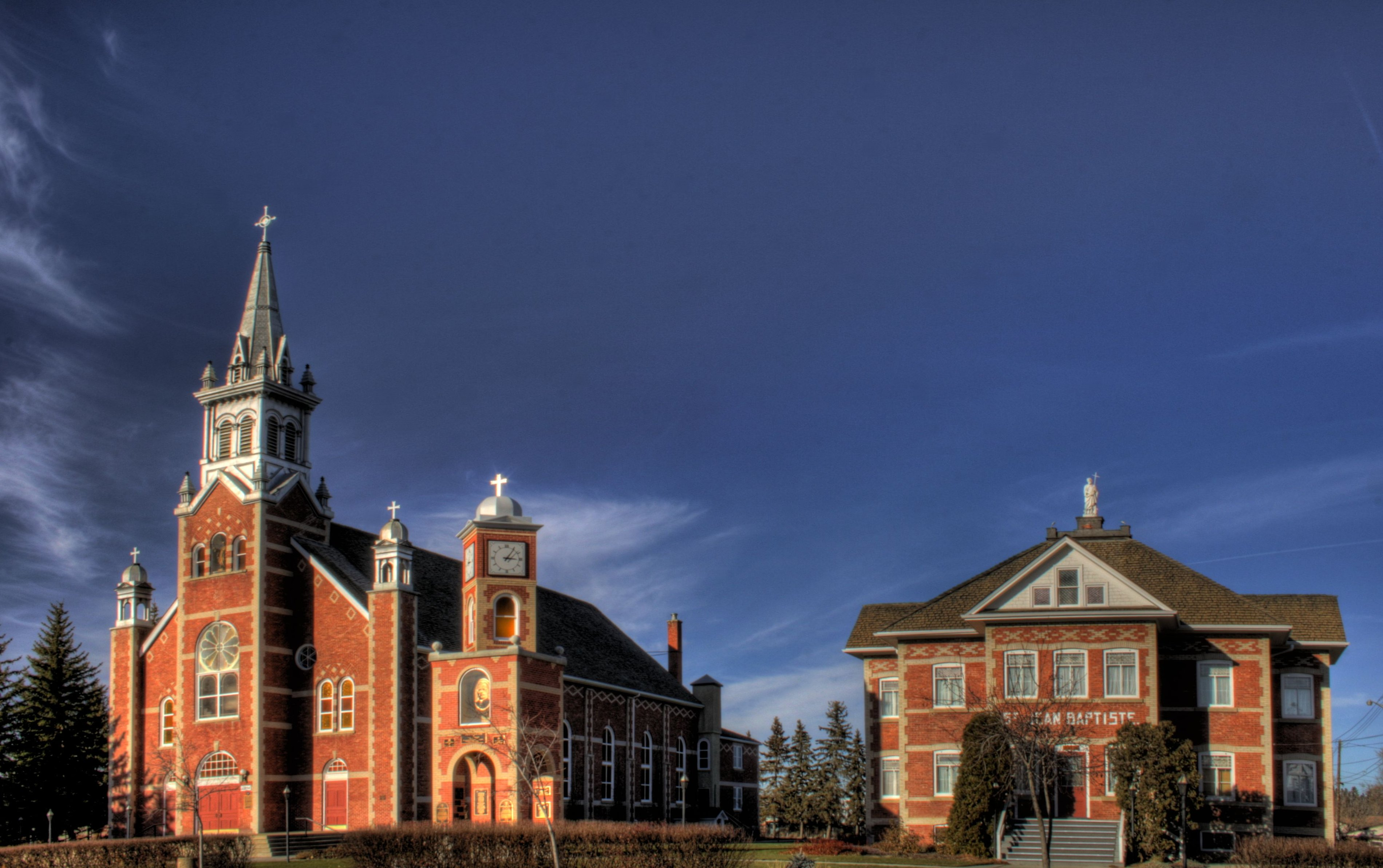
The former St Jean Baptiste Church in downtown Morinville.

Morinville was settled by Jean-Baptiste Morin, a priest and missionary of the Missionary Oblates of Mary Immaculate, who brought many French settlers in the late 1800s, followed by several German pioneers.

The monument located in St. Jean Baptiste Park lists the many names of pioneers and settlers to Morinville. Once situated on the street at 100 Avenue and 100 Street, the monument was moved to its present location in 2000, as it was a safety hazard and very difficult to enjoy with all the traffic at the intersection.

The first post-office opened in 1894.

=== Church of St. Jean-Baptiste ===
The Roman Catholic Church of St. Jean-Baptiste was built in 1907. The church, along with its adjacent but now inoperative convent, Morinville Convent, were declared a historical site in 1975. In 2005, the grounds of the church were landscaped with a clock tower, new grass, trees and shrubs, in celebration of Alberta's 100th anniversary as a province. On June 30, 2021, the church was completely destroyed by a suspicious fire, still under investigation. Four years later, the church was rebuilt and re-opened on December 18, 2025.

==== Native martyr ====
A few days prior to that, on December 13th, the Catholic Church beatified a young priest, Louis-Georges Doumain (1920-1944), who had been baptized in the original church. Born on February 7, 1920, in the neighboring hamlet of Cardiff to an immigrant French couple, his parents returned with him to their homeland in 1926. Growing up there, he followed a call to the ministry and was ordained in 1922.

Doumain was drafted the following year for compulsory labor by Nazi authorities in occupied France and transported to work in a German chemical factory. Arrested after presiding at a secret Mass, he refused freedom offered in exchange for ceasing his ministry; he was then transferred to a liquidation camp where he died after undergoing throat surgery on December 20, 1944 at the age of 24.

Doumain was one of fifty clergy and religious workers titled the Martyrs of the Apostolate who were beatified as a group by Pope Leo XIV in a ceremony at the Cathedral of Notre-Dame de Paris in France.

== Commerce ==
Morinville has a long history of successful business ventures as one of the first locations in Western Canada to open a Royal Bank of Canada in 1910 and a credit union in 1940. A series of successful international business ventures include Champion Pet Foods, which exports around the world.

== Demographics ==
Population history
Year	Pop.	±%
1996	6,226	—
2001	6,540	+5.0%
2006	6,775	+3.6%
2011	8,569	+26.5%
2016	9,848	+14.9%
2021	10,385	+5.5%
Source: Statistics Canada

In the 2021 Census of Population conducted by Statistics Canada, the Town of Morinville had a population of 10,385 living in 3,768 of its 3,981 total private dwellings, a change of 5.5% from its 2016 population of 9,848. With a land area of 11.15 km^{2} (4.31 sq mi), it had a population density of 931.4/km^{2} (2,412.3/sq mi) in 2021.

The population of the Town of Morinville according to its 2020 municipal census is 10,578, a 6.9% change from its 2016 municipal census population of 9,893.

In the 2016 Census of Population conducted by Statistics Canada, the Town of Morinville recorded a population of 9,848 living in 3,491 of its 3,611 total private dwellings, a 14.9% change from its 2011 population of 8,569. With a land area of 11.15 km^{2} (4.31 sq mi), it had a population density of 883.2/km^{2} (2,287.6/sq mi) in 2016.

Panethnic groups in the Town of Morinville (2001−2021)
Panethnic group	2021		2016		2011		2006		2001	
Panethnic group	Pop.	%	Pop.	%	Pop.	%	Pop.	%	Pop.	%
European (Note: Statistic includes all persons that did not make up part of a visible minority or an indigenous identity.)	8,540	84.22%	8,470	87.23%	7,770	91.74%	6,160	92.15%	6,160	95.73%
Indigenous	1,100	10.85%	870	8.96%	520	6.14%	360	5.39%	275	4.27%
Southeast Asian (Note: Statistic includes total responses of "Filipino" and "Southeast Asian" under visible minority section on census.)	155	1.53%	125	1.29%	35	0.41%	65	0.97%	15	0.23%
East Asian (Note: Statistic includes total responses of "Chinese", "Korean", and "Japanese" under visible minority section on census.)	110	1.08%	40	0.41%	75	0.89%	45	0.67%	15	0.23%
South Asian	85	0.84%	35	0.36%	10	0.12%	10	0.15%	0	0%
African	70	0.69%	105	1.08%	25	0.3%	45	0.67%	0	0%
Middle Eastern (Note: Statistic includes total responses of "West Asian" and "Arab" under visible minority section on census.)	35	0.35%	20	0.21%	30	0.35%	0	0%	0	0%
Latin American	25	0.25%	45	0.46%	0	0%	10	0.15%	0	0%
Other/multiracial (Note: Statistic includes total responses of "Visible minority, n.i.e." and "Multiple visible minorities" under visible minority section on census.)	40	0.39%	0	0%	0	0%	10	0.15%	0	0%
Total responses	10,140	97.64%	9,710	98.6%	8,470	98.84%	6,685	98.67%	6,435	98.39%
Total population	10,385	100%	9,848	100%	8,569	100%	6,775	100%	6,540	100%
Note: Totals greater than 100% due to multiple origin responses

== Economy ==
As of 2010, 93% of Morinville's tax base is residential in nature. One of the town's larger businesses, Champion Pet Foods, employs approximately 50 people.

== Attractions ==
Recreation amenities in Morinville include walking trails, a splash park, a trout pond, a skateboard park, a hockey arena, a curling rink, numerous parks and playgrounds, and outdoor fitness equipment stations along the trail system and at the splash park among other amenities. Other recreation amenities are available in St. Albert and Edmonton to the south.

The Morinville Leisure Centre (MLC) opened in May 2019. The facility contains an arena, a multi-use court space and a small gym. Future expansion of this facility is in consideration.

== Education ==
The Sturgeon Public School Division operates 2 schools in Morinville – École Morinville Public (ECE to Grade 4) and Four Winds Public School (Grade 5–9). Greater St. Albert Catholic Regional Division offers faith-based education in three schools – École Notre Dame Elementary, Georges H. Primeau Middle School and Morinville Community High School. Prior to 2011, Morinville had only Catholic schools, and no secular or Protestant schools. This led to non-Catholic parents starting an advocacy campaign to introduce a secular option for education in Morinville. In response, Sturgeon School Division and the Town of Morinville agreed to provide space for a secular education program for grades 1–4 for the 2011–2012 school year. Further, the Government of Alberta committed to conducting a census in Morinville, Legal, St. Albert and a portion of Sturgeon County to determine the minority faith in the area as a precursor to developing a long-term solution to address secular education in Morinville.

== Media ==
Morinville is currently served by one local weekly newspaper — The Free Press.

== See also ==
- List of towns in Alberta
- List of francophone communities in Alberta
- List of communities in Alberta
