= Lamoureux, Alberta =

Lamoureux
- Hamlet
- Location of Lamoureux Lamoureux (Canada)
- Coordinates: 53°42′55″N 113°13′28″W
- Country: Canada
- Province: Alberta
- Region: Edmonton Metropolitan Region
- Census division: 11
- Municipal district: Sturgeon County

Government
  - Type: Unincorporated
  - Governing body: Sturgeon County Council

Population (2008)
  - Total: 60
- Time zone: UTC−06:00 (Alberta Time)
- Area codes: 780, 587, 825

Lamoureux (/ˈlæməruː/) is a hamlet in central Alberta, Canada within Sturgeon County. It is located 6 kilometres (3.7 mi) northeast of Edmonton's city limits on the northern shore of the North Saskatchewan River, on the opposite side of the City of Fort Saskatchewan. The location has a view of the ruins of the old Fort, which can still be seen standing by the riverfront.

The area was settled in 1872 by the brothers Joseph and Francois Lamoureux. They built a gristmill, a lumber mill, and other industries. A post office was established shortly after February 1896. For the fiscal year ending October 1895, the lumber mill was the most productive in the Edmonton area, producing $15,588.65 of lumber (about $377,505 in 2022 Canadian dollars).

== Demographics ==
The population of Lamoureux according to the 2008 municipal census conducted by Sturgeon County is 60.

== See also ==
- List of communities in Alberta
- List of hamlets in Alberta
