= Carbondale, Alberta =

Carbondale
- Hamlet
- Location of Carbondale Carbondale (Canada)
- Coordinates: 53°44′47″N 113°31′37″W
- Country: Canada
- Province: Alberta
- Region: Edmonton Metropolitan Region
- Census division: 11
- Municipal district: Sturgeon County

Government
  - Type: Unincorporated
  - Governing body: Sturgeon County Council

Area (2021)
  - Land: 1.12 km^{2} (0.43 sq mi)

Population (2021)
  - Total: 78
  - Density: 70/km^{2} (180/sq mi)
- Time zone: UTC−06:00 (Alberta Time)
- Area codes: 780, 587, 825

Carbondale is a hamlet in central Alberta, Canada within Sturgeon County. It is located 2 kilometres (1.2 mi) west of Highway 28, approximately 11 kilometres (6.8 mi) north of Edmonton's city limits.

Carbondale was so named on account of coal mines near the original town site; coal is a carbon-based fuel.

Carbondale is the original site of Carbondale Rail Station (1913-1959).

== Demographics ==
In the 2021 Census of Population conducted by Statistics Canada, Carbondale had a population of 78 living in 37 of its 40 total private dwellings, a change of 4% from its 2016 population of 75. With a land area of 1.12 km^{2} (0.43 sq mi), it had a population density of 69.6/km^{2} (180.4/sq mi) in 2021.

As a designated place in the 2016 Census of Population conducted by Statistics Canada, Carbondale had a population of 75 living in 32 of its 38 total private dwellings, a change of −12.8% from its 2011 population of 86. With a land area of 1.12 km^{2} (0.43 sq mi), it had a population density of 67.0/km^{2} (173.4/sq mi) in 2016.

== See also ==
- List of communities in Alberta
- List of designated places in Alberta
- List of hamlets in Alberta
