= Pine Sands =

- Hamlet
- Location of Pine Sands Pine Sands (Canada)
- Coordinates: 53°45′14″N 114°01′10″W
- Country: Canada
- Province: Alberta
- Region: Edmonton Metropolitan Region
- Census division: 11
- Municipal district: Sturgeon County

Government
  - Type: Unincorporated
  - Governing body: Sturgeon County Council

Population (2008)
  - Total: 30
- Time zone: UTC−06:00 (Alberta Time)
- Area codes: 780, 587, 825

Pine Sands is a hamlet in central Alberta, Canada within Sturgeon County on the southern shore of Sandy Lake. It is located approximately 13 kilometres (8.1 mi) west of Highway 44 and 29 kilometres (18 mi) northwest of Edmonton's city limits.

== Demographics ==
The population of Pine Sands according to the 2008 municipal census conducted by Sturgeon County is 30.

== See also ==
- List of communities in Alberta
- List of hamlets in Alberta
