= Alcomdale =

- Hamlet
- Location of Alcomdale Alcomdale (Canada)
- Coordinates: 53°53′35″N 113°50′17″W
- Country: Canada
- Province: Alberta
- Region: Edmonton Metropolitan Region
- Census division: 11
- Municipal district: Sturgeon County

Government
  - Type: Unincorporated
  - Governing body: Sturgeon County Council

Area (2021)
  - Land: 0.2 km^{2} (0.077 sq mi)

Population (2021)
  - Total: 65
  - Density: 325.2/km^{2} (842/sq mi)
- Time zone: UTC−06:00 (Alberta Time)
- Area codes: 780, 587, 825

Alcomdale is a hamlet in central Alberta, Canada within Sturgeon County. It is located on Highway 44, approximately 34 kilometres (21 mi) northwest of Edmonton's city limits. There is a community hall and public playground within the hamlet, no other services.

== History ==
The community has the name of Dr. Alcombreck, the original owner of the site.

== Demographics ==
In the 2021 Census of Population conducted by Statistics Canada, Alcomdale had a population of 65 living in 30 of its 36 total private dwellings, a change of −26.1% from its 2016 population of 88. With a land area of 0.2 km^{2} (0.077 sq mi), it had a population density of 325.0/km^{2} (841.7/sq mi) in 2021.

As a designated place in the 2016 Census of Population conducted by Statistics Canada, Alcomdale had a population of 88 living in 28 of its 33 total private dwellings, a change of 37.5% from its 2011 population of 64. With a land area of 0.2 km^{2} (0.077 sq mi), it had a population density of 440.0/km^{2} (1,139.6/sq mi) in 2016.

== See also ==
- List of communities in Alberta
- List of hamlets in Alberta
