= Mearns, Alberta =

Mearns
- Hamlet
- Location of Mearns Mearns (Canada)
- Coordinates: 53°52′17″N 113°48′14″W
- Country: Canada
- Province: Alberta
- Region: Edmonton Metropolitan Region
- Census division: 11
- Municipal district: Sturgeon County

Government
  - Type: Unincorporated
  - Governing body: Sturgeon County Council

Population (2008)
  - Total: 10
- Time zone: UTC−06:00 (Alberta Time)
- Area codes: 780, 587, 825

Mearns is a hamlet in central Alberta, Canada within Sturgeon County. It is located approximately 11 kilometres (6.8 mi) west of Highway 2 and 31 kilometres (19 mi) northwest of Edmonton's city limits.

== Demographics ==
The population of Mearns according to the 2008 municipal census conducted by Sturgeon County is 10.

== See also ==
- List of communities in Alberta
- List of hamlets in Alberta
