= Legal, Alberta =

Legal
- Town
- Town of Legal; Ville de Legal
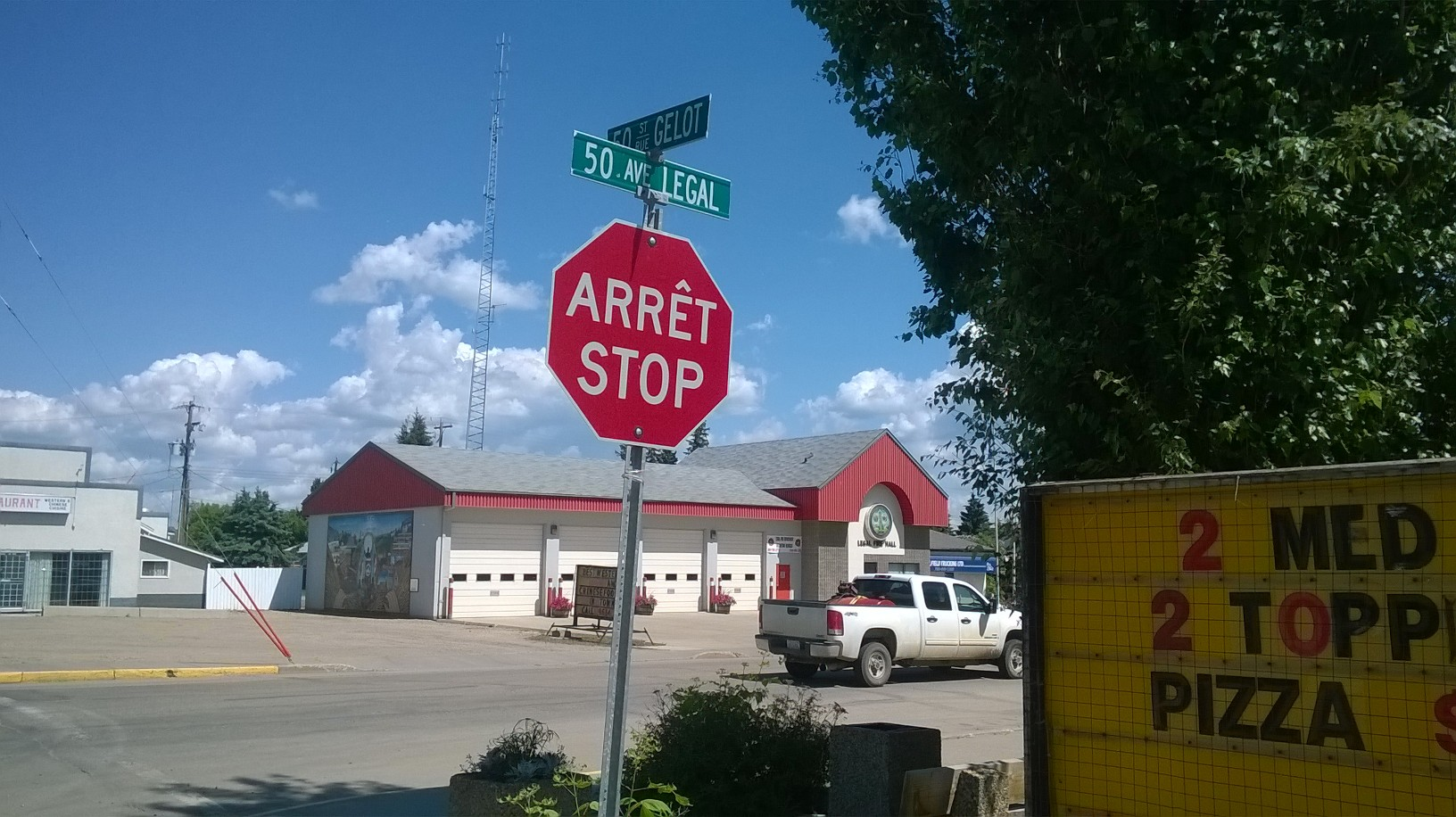
- Bilingual French/English stop sign and street signs at 50th Street and 50th Avenue

- Location within Sturgeon County Location within Alberta
- Coordinates: 53°56′57″N 113°35′42″W
- Country: Canada
- Province: Alberta
- Region: Edmonton Metropolitan Region
- Census division: 11
- Municipal district: Sturgeon County
- Incorporated
  - Village: February 20, 1914
  - Town: January 1, 1998

Government
  - Mayor: Carol Tremblay
  - Governing body: Legal Town Council: Patrick Hills; Fred Malott; Trina Jones; Andrew Beaton

Area (2021)
  - Land: 3.18 km^{2} (1.23 sq mi)
- Elevation: 705 m (2,313 ft)

Population (2021)
  - Total: 1,232
  - Density: 387.9/km^{2} (1,005/sq mi)
- Time zone: UTC−06:00 (Alberta Time)
- Area code: 780
- Highway: Highway 651
- Website: www.legal.ca

Legal /lɪˈɡæl/ is a town in the Edmonton Metropolitan Region of Alberta, Canada within Sturgeon County. It is 2.4 km (1.5 mi) east of Highway 2 on Highway 651, approximately 42 km (26 mi) north of Edmonton.

Legal was established in 1894 as a Francophone community, and is named in honour of Bishop Émile-Joseph Legal. The town, the French Mural Capital of Canada, is known for its 28 murals.

== Demographics ==
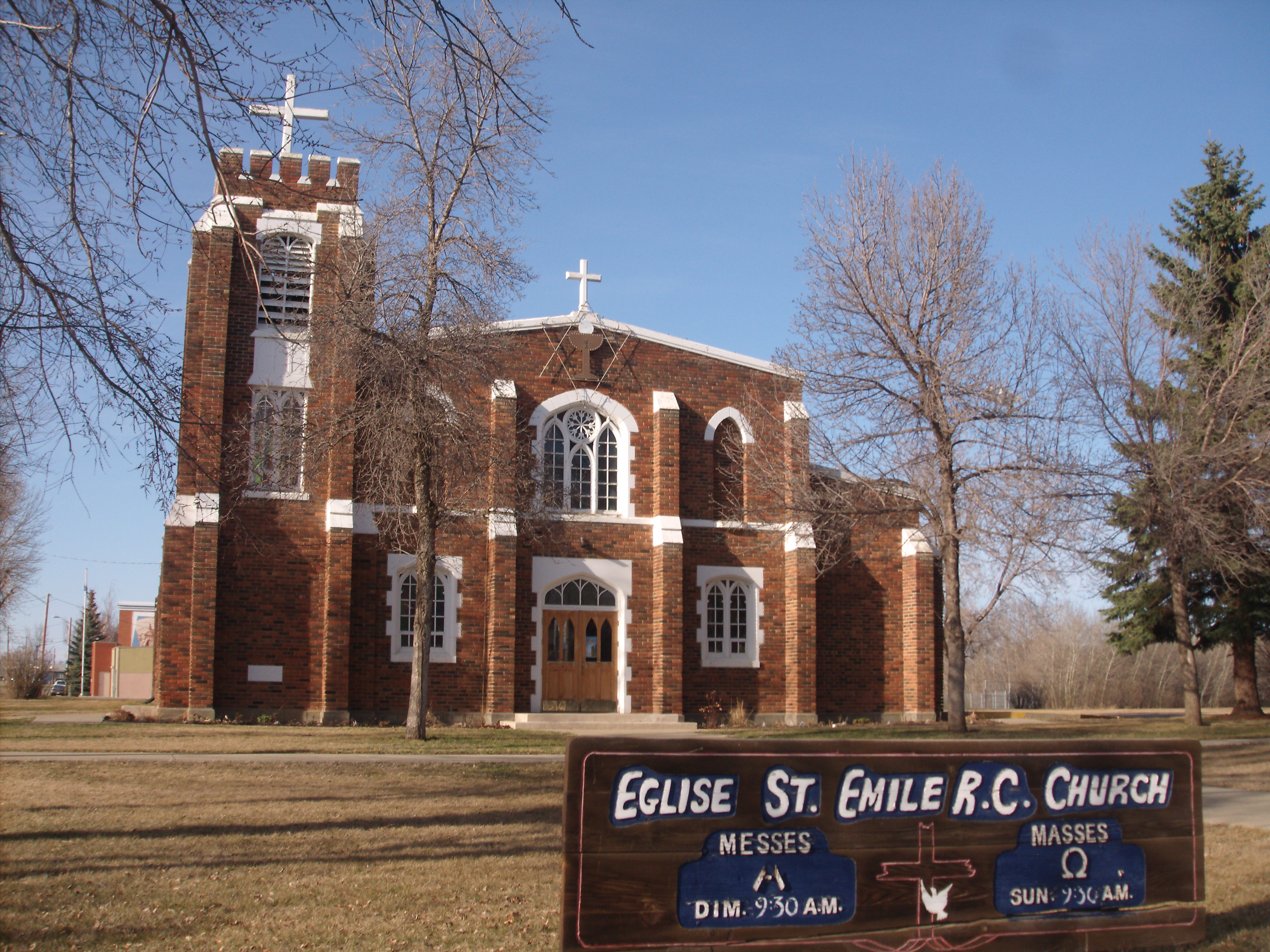
Eglise St. Emile R.C. Church

In the 2021 Census of Population conducted by Statistics Canada, the Town of Legal had a population of 1,232 living in 455 of its 489 total private dwellings, a change of −8.4% from its 2016 population of 1,345. With a land area of 3.18 km^{2} (1.23 sq mi), it had a population density of 387.4/km^{2} (1,003.4/sq mi) in 2021.

In the 2016 Census of Population conducted by Statistics Canada, the Town of Legal recorded a population of 1,345 living in 448 of its 465 total private dwellings, a 9.8% change from its 2011 population of 1,225. With a land area of 3.18 km^{2} (1.23 sq mi), it had a population density of 423.0/km^{2} (1,095.5/sq mi) in 2016.

== Education ==
The Greater North Central Francophone Education Region No. 2 operates a francophone elementary/junior school in Legal named Citadelle School (École Citadelle), while Greater St. Albert Catholic Schools operates an English elementary/junior school. Sturgeon Public School operates a Pre-Kindergarten to Grade 6 program.

== Notable people ==
- Paul Lorieau (1942–2013), – optician and national anthem singer for the Edmonton Oilers from 1981 to 2011.

== See also ==
- List of communities in Alberta
- List of francophone communities in Alberta
- List of towns in Alberta
