= Sturgeon County =

Municipal district in Alberta, Canada

- Municipal district
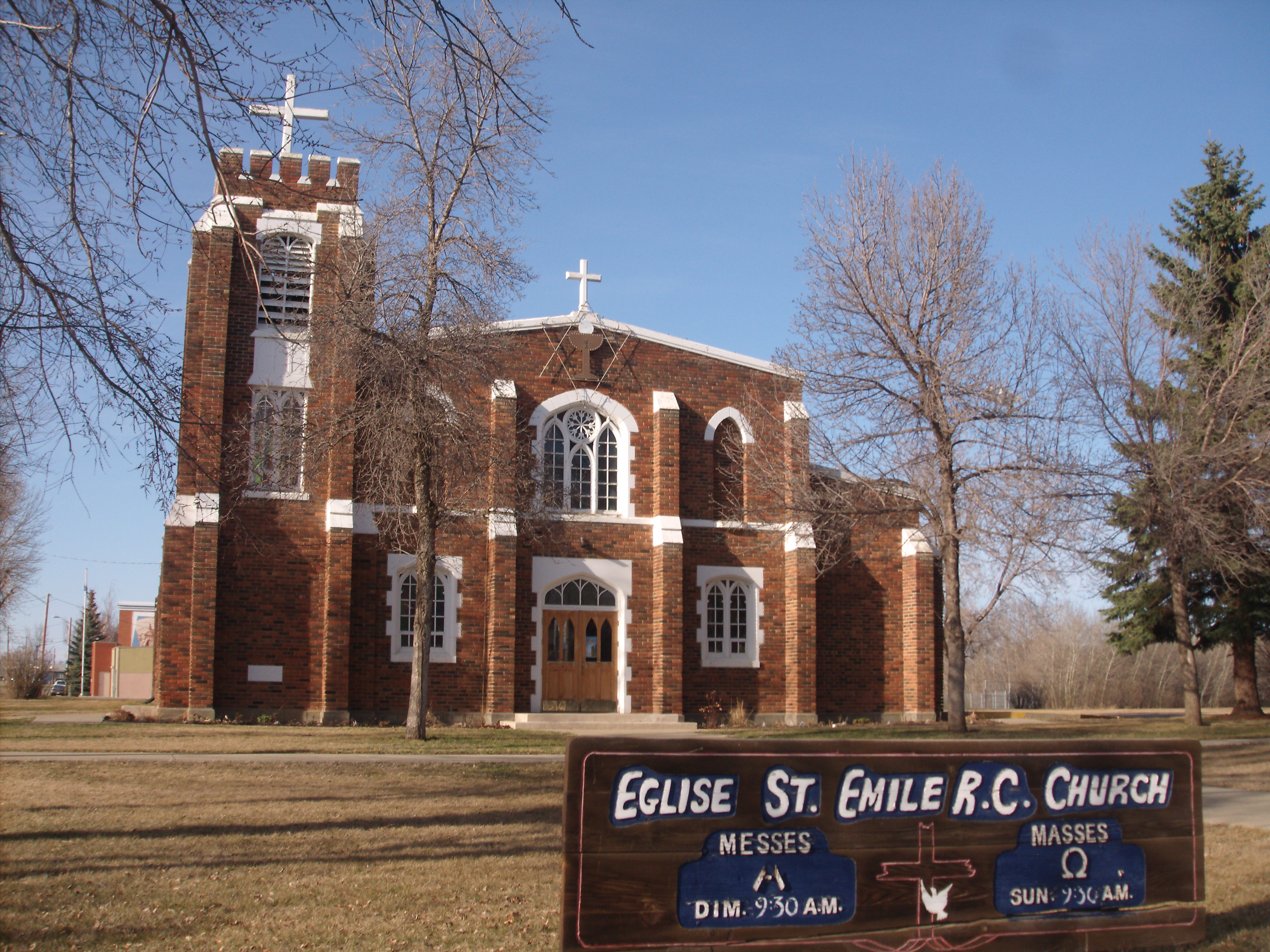
- St. Emile Roman Catholic Church in Legal

- Logo

- Location within Alberta
- Coordinates: 53°48′8″N 113°38′59″W
- Country: Canada
- Province: Alberta
- Region: Edmonton Metropolitan Region
- Census division: 11
- Established: 1955
- Incorporated: 1997 (County)
- Named for: Sturgeon River

Government
  - Mayor: Alanna Hnatiw
  - Governing body: Sturgeon County Council: Dan Derouin; Kristin Toms; Wayne Bokenfohr; Neal Comeau; Patrick Tighe; Karen Shaw
  - CAO: Travis Peter
  - Administrative office: Morinville

Area (2021)
  - Land: 2,084.24 km^{2} (804.73 sq mi)

Population (2021)
  - Total: 20,061
  - Density: 9.6/km^{2} (25/sq mi)
- Time zone: UTC−06:00 (Alberta Time)
- Forward sortation area: T8T
- Website: sturgeoncounty.ca

Sturgeon County is a municipal district in the Edmonton Metropolitan Region of Alberta, Canada. It is north of Edmonton and west of the North Saskatchewan River. Sturgeon County is located in Division No. 11 and was named for the Sturgeon River.

== History ==
In 1876, the Crown gained title to the land that would later become Sturgeon County in Treaty 6 with First Nations. The area was first settled in 1879. The first settlers were several francophone families.

The Municipal District (MD) of Sturgeon River No. 90 was originally incorporated on January 1, 1955 and became the County of Sturgeon No. 15 on January 1, 1961. It reverted back to the MD of Sturgeon No. 90 on July 12, 1965. Its name was changed to Sturgeon County on April 23, 1997.

== Geography ==
=== Communities and localities ===
The following urban municipalities are surrounded by Sturgeon County.

Cities

- St. Albert

Towns

- Bon Accord
- Gibbons
- Legal
- Morinville
- Redwater

Villages

- none

Summer villages

- none

The following hamlets are located within Sturgeon County.

Hamlets

- Alcomdale
- Calahoo
- Carbondale
- Cardiff
- Lamoureux
- Mearns
- Namao
- Pine Sands
- Riviere Qui Barre
- Villeneuve

The following localities are located within Sturgeon County.

Localities

- Amelia
- Austin Acres
- Banko Junction
- Braun Village
- Cameron Park
- Cardiff-Echoes
- Cardiff-Pittsburgh
- Casa Vista
- Clearview Acres
- Coronado
- Crestview Heights
- Dover Estates
- Dream Hollow Estates
- Dream Nook
- Duagh
- Eastgate
- Eldorena
- Excelsior
- Fairhaven East Subdivision
- Fairhaven West Subdivision
- Fairydell
- Fedorah

- Fort Augustus
- Fort Saskatchewan Settlement
- Freemore Estates
- Gibbons Lea
- Gibbons Station
- Glenview
- Glory Hills (designated place) or Glory Hills Development
- Golden Heights
- Grandview Heights
- Greenacres Estates
- Hansen Subdivision
- Hanson Subdivision
- Hewitt Estates (designated place)
- Hillsborough Estates
- Hu Haven (designated place)
- Juniper Hill
- Lancaster Park
- Lily Lake Estates
- Lower Manor Estates (designated place)
- MacArthur Siding
- Manor Estates
- Maple Ridge

- Namao (designated place, different than the hamlet of the same name)
  - Namao Ridge Estates
  - Sturgeon Valley Estates
- New Lunnon
- Noroncal
- North Point
- Nywening
- Osthoff Estates
- Peavey
- Pilon Creek Estates
- Pinewood Estates
- Regency Estates
- Reyda Vista Subdivision
- Richfield Estates
- Riverside Park
- Riviere Qui Barre
- Rol-Ana Park
- Rosal Acres
- Shil Shol
- Silverchief Subdivision
- Skyglen

- St. Albert Settlement
- Strathcona Heights
- Sturgeon
- Sturgeon Creek Subdivision
- Sturgeon Crest Subdivision
- Sturgeon Heights
- Sturgeon Valley Vista
- Sturgeon View Estates
- Summer Brook
- Summerbrook Estates
- Trestle Ridge
- Turfside Park
- Upper Manor Estates (designated place)
- Upper and Lower Viscount Estates (designated place)
  - Lower Viscount Estates or Lower Viscount
  - Upper Viscount Estates or Upper Viscount Estates Subdivision
- Volmer
- Waterdale Park
- Waybrook
- Wildlife Park
- Woodridge Estates

Other places

- Bristol Oakes

== Demographics ==
In the 2021 Census of Population conducted by Statistics Canada, Sturgeon County had a population of 20,061 living in 7,021 of its 7,599 total private dwellings, a change of −2.1% from its 2016 population of 20,495. With a land area of 2,084.24 km^{2} (804.73 sq mi), it had a population density of 9.6/km^{2} (24.9/sq mi) in 2021.

The population of Sturgeon County according to its 2020 municipal census is 20,506, a 7% change from its 2008 municipal census population of 19,165.

In the 2016 Census of Population conducted by Statistics Canada, Sturgeon County had a population of 20,495 living in 6,870 of its 7,337 total private dwellings, a 4.7% change from its 2011 population of 19,578. With a land area of 2,090.13 km^{2} (807.00 sq mi), it had a population density of 9.8/km^{2} (25.4/sq mi) in 2016.

== Economy ==
Sturgeon County's Economic Development Department is responsible for promoting business.

== See also ==
- List of communities in Alberta
- List of francophone communities in Alberta
- List of municipal districts in Alberta
