= Shum =

Shum may refer to:

== Surnames ==
- Shum (surname), a surname in various cultures (including a list of people with the name)
  - Cen (surname) (岑), sometimes romanized Shum in Cantonese
  - Shen (surname) (沈), sometimes romanized Shum in Cantonese

== Video games ==
- Shüm, a minigame in Control franchise

== Places ==
- Shum (location), a town in Pakistan
- Shum Laka, most prominent site in the Laka Valley of northwest Cameroon
- Shum-gora, burial mound in northwestern Russia

== Music ==
- "Shum" (song), 2021 song by Go_A

== Politics ==
- Takkanot Shum, set of decrees formulated and agreed by three central cities of medieval Rhineland
- Wagshum or shum, the governor of the province of Wag, with hereditary title from Zagwe dynasty; see Ethiopian aristocratic and court titles
