= Schumm =

Schumm is a surname. Notable people with the surname include:

- Caroline Zoe Schumm (born 1988), American fashion designer
- Hans Schumm (1896–1990), German-born American Hollywood character actor
- Harry Schumm (1877–1953), American actor
- Herb Schumm (1942–1985), Canadian football player
- Howie Schumm (1940–2015), Canadian football player
- Karl Schumm (1899-?), German diver
- Trevor Schumm, Australian curler
- Walter Schumm (born 1951), American academic
