= Shum (surname) =

- Language: Chinese, English, German

Other names
- Variant forms: Chinese: Sam; German: Schumm

Shum is a surname in various cultures.

== Origins ==
Shum may be the spelling of the Cantonese pronunciation of two Chinese surnames, listed below by their spelling in Pinyin (which reflects the Mandarin pronunciation):

- Cén (岑), which originated as a toponymic surname. (Jyutping: Sam4; Cantonese Yale: Sàhm).
- Shěn (沈). It is nearly-homophonous with the above surname in Cantonese (Jyutping: Sam2; Cantonese Yale: Sám).

Shum is also an English surname. Early records of the surname in England in the International Genealogical Index of the Church of Jesus Christ of Latter-day Saints include one bearer in 1748 in London and another in 1768 in Toddington, Bedfordshire.

The German surname Shum is a variant spelling of Schum or Schumm, which originated as a toponymic surname after a place in Upper Saxony. It is also found as an Ashkenazi Jewish surname (Yiddish and Hebrew: שום).

== Statistics ==
According to statistics cited by Patrick Hanks, there were 342 people on the island of Great Britain and 21 on the island of Ireland with the surname Shum as of 2011. The 1881 United Kingdom census found 73 people with the surname, primarily in London and Staffordshire.

The 2010 United States census found 2,222 people with the surname Shum, making it the 13,627th-most-common surname in the country. This represented an increase from 2,025 (13,724th-most-common) in the 2000 census. In both censuses, about four-fifths of the bearers of the surname identified as Asian, and fourteen percent as White.

== People ==
=== Chinese surname Cén (岑) ===
- John Shum (岑建勳; born 1952), Hong Kong actor and film producer
- Shum Kwok Pui (岑國培; born 1970), Hong Kong footballer
- Harry Shum Jr. (岑勇康; born 1982), American actor
- Lester Shum (岑敖暉; born 1993), Hong Kong social activist

=== Chinese surname Shěn (沈) ===
- Shen Hongying (沈鴻英; 1871–1935), also transcribed Shum Hung-ying, Chinese general in the Old Guangxi Clique
- Lydia Shum (沈殿霞; 1945–2008), Hong Kong actress
- Harry Shum (沈向洋; born 1966), Chinese-born American computer scientist
- Mina Shum (沈小艾; born 1966), Hong Kong-born Canadian filmmaker

=== Other or unknown ===
- George Shum (1751–1805), English politician
- Jim Shum (1853–1914), Chinese-born New Zealand gold miner
- Itzhak Shum (יצחק שום; born 1948), Israeli footballer
- Matthew Shum (born 1970), American economist
- Idan Shum (עידן שום; born 1976), Israeli footballer
