= Lo Wai =

Lo Wai may refer to:

- Lo Wei, sometimes spelled Lo Wai (1918–1996), a Hong Kong film actor and director
- Lo Wai (老圍), a walled village in Lung Yeuk Tau, Fanling, Hong Kong
- Lo Wai (老圍), a village in Tsuen Wan, Hong Kong
