= Shum Hung-ying =

Chinese general of the Warlord Era (1871–1935)

General Shum Hung-ying
- 沈鴻英
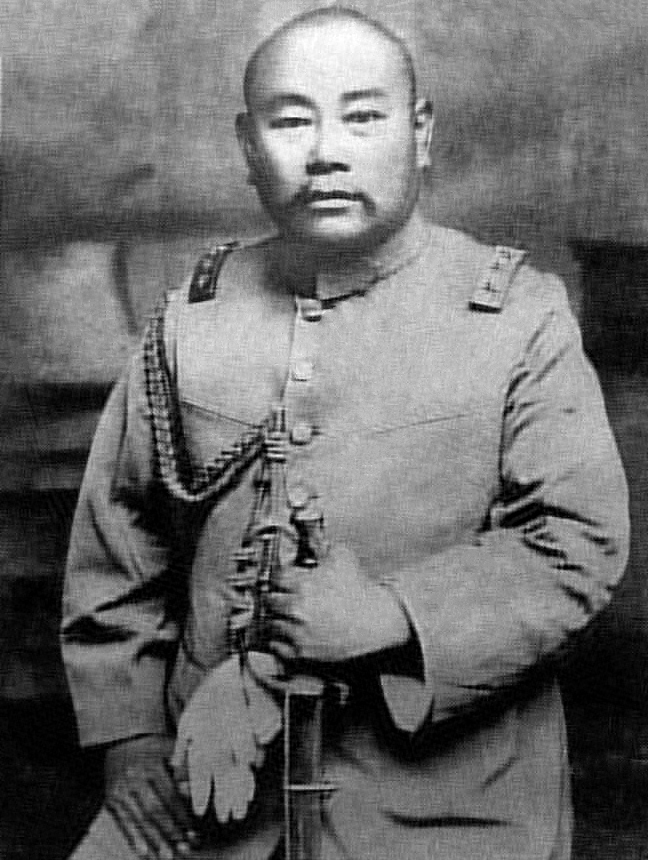
- Born: Shen Yaying (沈亞英), 1871; Luorong County, Liuzhou Prefecture, Guangxi Province, China
- Died: 1935 (aged 63–64); Hong Kong
- Resting place: Shum Family Cemetery, in Pat Heung off Kam Po Road, adjacent to the Taoism Jiu Xiao Guan (Hong Kong)
- Monuments: General House, Fung Kat Heung, Kam Tin, Yuen Long, New Territories
- Other name: Shen Guannan (沈冠南)
- Occupations: Military governor of Guangdong and Commander-in-Chief of the Frontier Defence of the Third Route Army of Guangdong and Guangxi (粵桂邊防第三路軍總司令)
- Board member of: Chairman, Board of Director of Pok Oi Hospital
- Military career
- Known for: Old Guangxi Clique Warlord

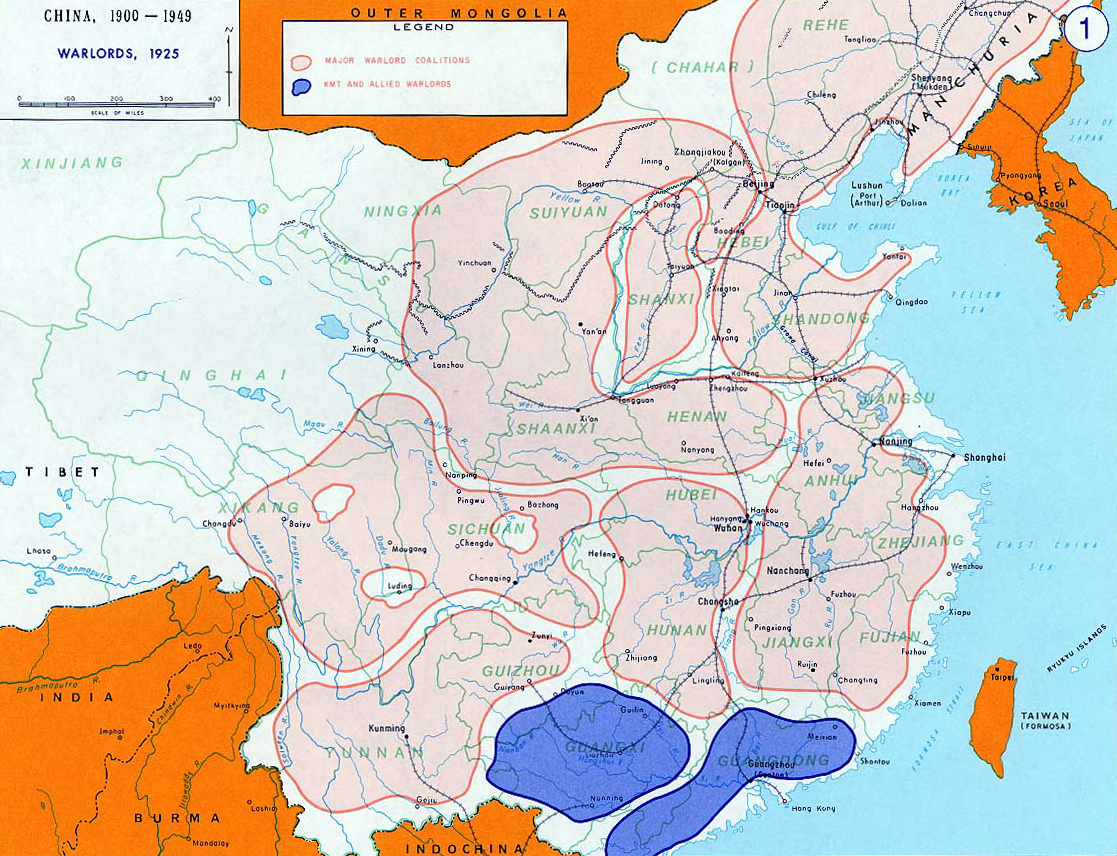
Main military coalitions of Chinese warlords, 1925. Guangdong and Guangxi are blue. .Map created by the US Military Academy (West Point).

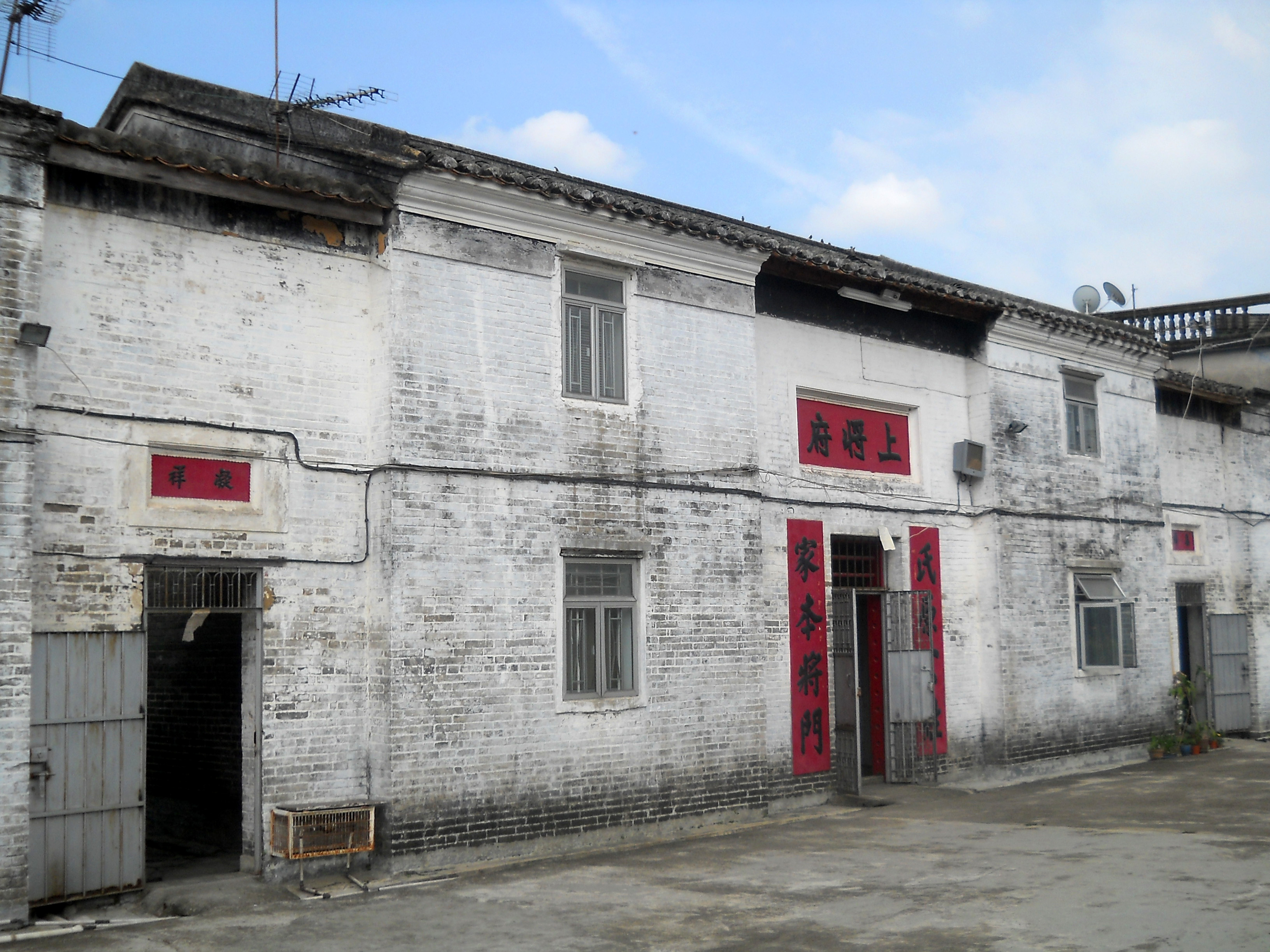
Main Building of the General House in Fung Kat Heung, Yuen Long, New Territories, Hong Kong.

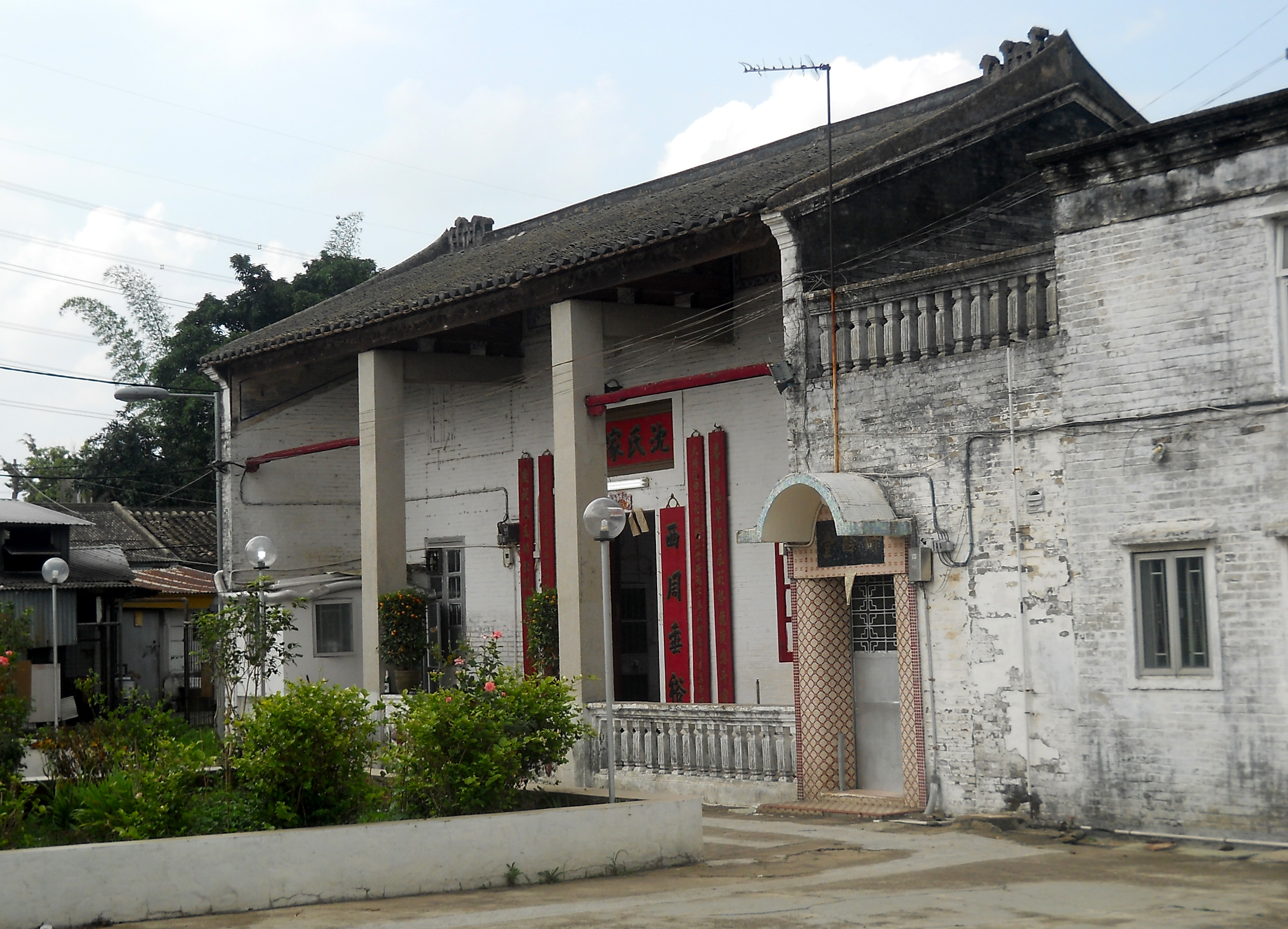
Shum Ancestral Hall of the General House in Fung Kat Heung, YuenLong, New Territories, Hong Kong.

Shum Hung-ying or Shen Hongying (simplified Chinese: 沈鸿英; traditional Chinese: 沈鴻英; pinyin: Shěn Hóngyīng; Jyutping: sam2 hung4 jing1, October 15, 1871 – January 28, 1935) was a Chinese general in the Old Guangxi Clique during the Republic of China (1912–1949). Shum was given the title of General Hip Wai (協威將軍) by President Li Yuanhong. He served as military governor of Guangdong from March 1923 to May 1924 in the Warlord Era. He was allied with Wu Peifu. He was defeated by Li Zongren in 1925.

Following his defeat in the Guangdong–Guangxi War, Shum retired in Hong Kong and built his residence, now referred to as the "General House", in the location now known as the village of Fung Kat Heung in Yeun Long, New Territories. The Shum Residence has been determined to be a historic building of special merit by the Antiquities Advisory Board (AAB) of Hong Kong, which considers that efforts should be made for its preservation.

== Life ==
=== Rise in the Old Guangxi Clique ===
Shum was born into a poor family and moved to Luorong (雒容) of Guangxi from Enping of Guangdong. He was a local bandit in his early years and gradually became the leader, and later became a prefecture officer (管帶) in the Qing government. After the Revolution of 1911, he was recruited by revolutionaries affiliated with Liu Zhenhuan.

In 1912, Shum was promoted to superintendent. A year later, the second revolution broke out. He broke away from the revolutionaries and expelled his superior Liu Zhenhuan. As a result, Shum won praise from Guangxi warlord Lu Rongting and was promoted again. Later, he helped Lu suppress the rebels and was promoted to commander.

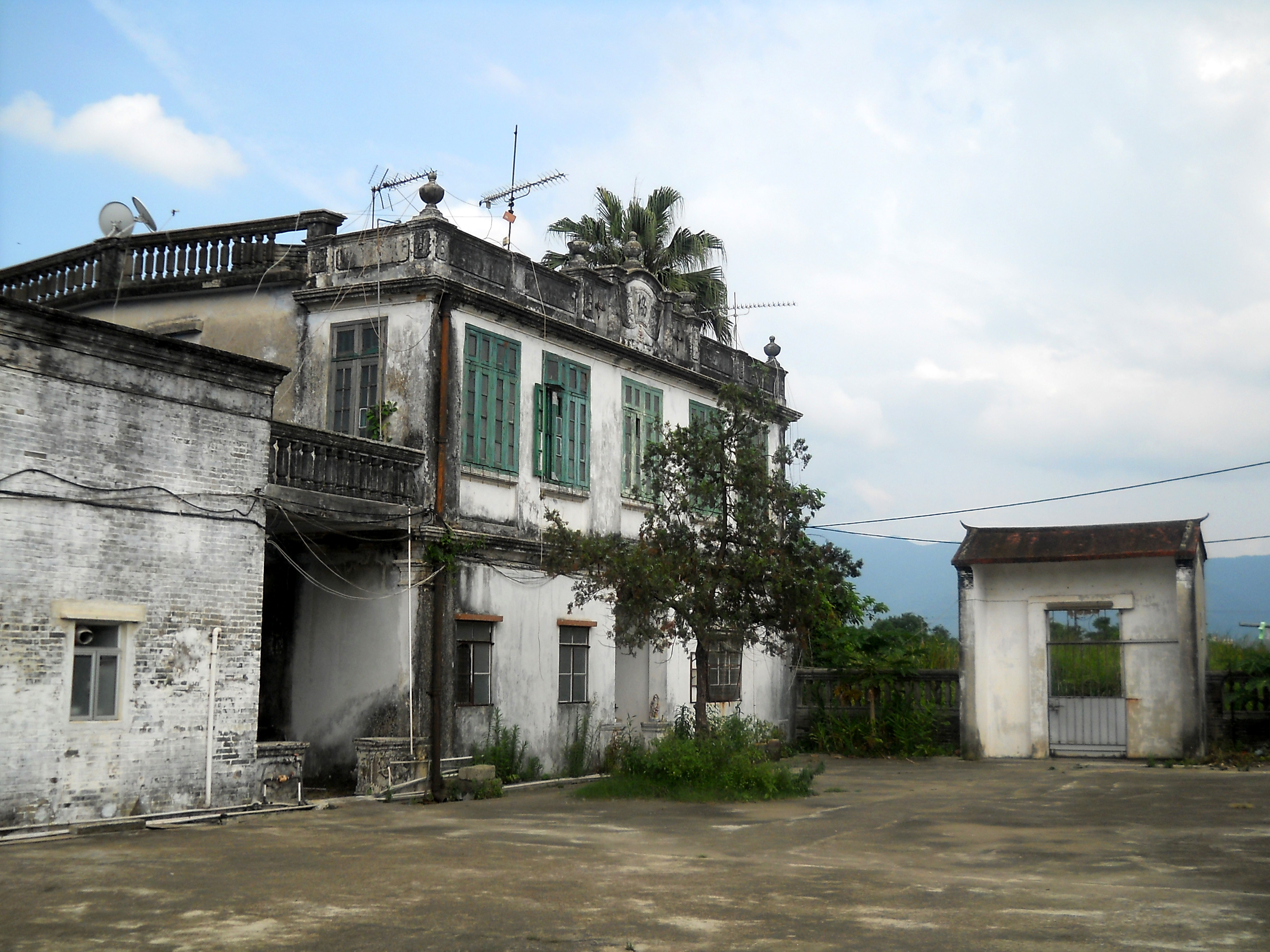
Hip Wai House of the General House in Fung Kat Heung, Yuen Long, New Territories, Hong Kong.

In March 1916, during the National Protection War against Yuan Shikai, Lu attacked Guangdong General (Supervisor) Long Jiguang, who backed Yuan. Shum followed Lu and was appointed as the guardian of Qinlian. In 1916, Shum was also sent to assist Hunan, and he led his troops to the north of Hunan to attack Yuan Pai's Xiang. Du Tang Xiangming. In December 1917, when Long landed in Guangdong again, Shum was appointed as the General Commander of the Third Army and repelled him.

After this battle, he was appointed as General Commander (commander-in-chief) of the Third Army of the Guangdong Guardian Army and Qiongya Guard Envoy, and in August 1918 he was moved to Shaoguan. In the winter of 1919, he was stationed in Beijiang and was appointed concurrently as Guardian of South Guangdong, Jiangxi and Hunan Border Defense Supervisor.

=== Relationship with Sun Yat-sen ===
In 1920, when Sun Yat-sen and Chen Jiongming attacked Guangdong, Lu and Shum were defeated and retreated to Guangxi. Shum served as the general commander (commander-in-chief) of the 3rd Road Army of the Guangxi Border Defense Army and led three divisions in Hexian and Pingle areas.

After Lu attempted to retake Guangdong, Chen counterattacked Guangxi on Sun's orders in June 1921, and Liu Zhenhuan turned against Lu. Shum, who realized that the situation was unfavorable, sent a telegram to Lu to back down. Shum then took over as the commander-in-chief of the Guangxi army in a rescue attempt to ally with Chen, who nevertheless continued the attack. At a disadvantage, Shum sought refuge in Hunan Province with Zhao Hengti.

Later, with the support of Wu Peifu of the Beiyang government, Shum was appointed as the commander of the 17th Division of the Beiyang Army. In July 1922, Shum was ordered by Wu to attack Guangdong, but failed. However, in November, Shum returned to Guangxi Province, occupied Guilin, Liuzhou, and Wuzhou, and regained his position as a leading military officer in Guangxi Province.

On June 16, 1922, Chen attacked Sun, and Sun then allied with Shum and Liu of the Gui army and Yang Ximin and Fan Shisheng of the Yunnan clique. Shum was appointed as the commander-in-chief of the Guangxi army. In December, the four generals organized an army to attack Chen in Guangzhou, and in January 1923, Chen was expelled from Guangzhou.

=== Battles over Guangxi ===
Shortly after Shum's attack on Sun in Guangzhou in April 1923, a three-way conflict over Guangxi Province began between Shum, Lu Rongting, and Li Zongren's New Guangxi clique.

Shum formed a de facto coalition with the New Guangxi clique to counter Lu, the strongest of the three powers. In April 1924, Lu marched into Guilin, surrounded and attacked Shum. In August, Lu withdrew to Quanzhou, and Shum occupied Guilin. In September, Shum captured Quanzhou. Lu was expelled from Guangxi and was forced to back down in October.

In 1925, in skirmishes with the New Guangxi clique, Shum was gradually forced into a disadvantage. He lost Guilin in April and was soon expelled from Guangxi. Shum fled to Hong Kong with his family and retired from the military.

Shum died in Hong Kong on January 28, 1935, at the age of 63. His private cemetery is in Pat Heung off Kam Po Road, adjacent to the Taoism Jiu Xiao Guan (Hong Kong). There are about ten tombs of various sizes of his wives and descendants. Inscribed in stone, on the "Master Tomb" is "The Tomb of General Xiewei Crowned the Nanfu Monarch" by the general Li Genyuan.

== Military service ==
Formerly known as Shen Yaying (沈亞英), Shum was born in Luorong County, Guangxi on October 15, 1874. He was a first generation was Hakka in Jiaying Prefecture (now Meizhou City), Guangdong. As he and his younger brother and older sister became adults and married, and after the birth his eldest son, in order to improve the livelihood of the family, he and his brother worked as farmers. They walked together to the market in neighboring states and counties to sell groceries. He also sold herbal medicines, such as Gaodan Wansan, to supplement his income. After the autumn harvest every year, to pick up the slack, he and his brother each performed one or two sets of Shaolin martial arts to attract the audience. In the winter of the 26th year of Guangxu, when they were opening their stall in Changtang in Liucheng County in Guangxi, they were robbed by subordinates of Qin Shaoqu's regiment. His brother was seriously injured, but Shum escaped injury. To avenge his brother, Shum pursued and killed his attackers then enlisted as a soldier in the Guixiang Army under the command of Huang Zhonghao. A few years later, Shum was promoted to a fifth-grade blue collar (equal to a company commander rank). He resigned shortly after getting acquainted with Li Deshan. On May 11, 1904, Lu Yafa was in the Liuzhou Uprising. Li Deshan invited them to participate.

Later, he participated in the Guangzhou Uprising on March 29, 1911. After the Wuchang Uprising on August 19 of the same year (October 10th in the Gregorian calendar), Shum participated in the Liuzhou Uprising led by the Crown Three. During the Liuzhou Uprising, Shum was promoted to the commander of the rebel army and appointed as the third management belt. After the revolution, he was promoted to be a group leader in He County. In the spring of 1914, when the bandits along the border of Hunan and Guangxi were eliminated, and he was promoted to the third commander of Guangxi Central District in Yulin.

After Chen Jiongming rebelled in 1922, on June 18, Shum replied from Jiangxi that he could return to the Jing Chao of Guangdong. Ji'an led his troops into Guangdong and returned to Guangxi. He was stopped by Chen Jiayou and Li Mingyang of the Hunan Army. He wanted to return to Gannan and was also in charge of Li Liejun Resistance is to retreat to the Guangdong, Jiangxi, and Hunan border areas and find another way out.

Shum was trapped in the border areas of Guangdong, Jiangxi and Hunan, an unsustainable position. In mid-August, he surrendered to Sun and led his men back to Guangxi from the border of Hunan. Ren, Luzhai, Luorong, Liuzhou area. On December 19, Shum received a secret order from Shanghai by Sun Yat-sen in Liuzhou, instructing the strategy of attacking Chen Jiongming. Shum immediately followed the order and informed Sun's senior generals in Yunnan, Guangxi and Guangdong. On December 20 On the 6th, a meeting was held at the White Horse Temple in Teng County to discuss strategies and cooperation issues for the battle against Chen Jiongming. After the meeting, the various armies immediately launched an operation to join Guangzhou, known as the "White Horse League".

On January 16, 1923, the Dian, Guangxi and Guangdong allied forces met in Guangzhou. On February 24, Sun Yat-sen ordered the designation of Zhaoqing to Wuzhou as the defense area for Shum's army. Shum secretly sent personnel to contact Wu Peifu. On March 20, on Wu's recommendation, the Beijing government announced that Shum was the supervisor of Guangdong. The honorary title awarded to Shum by the Beijing government was "Two first-class Wenhuzhang Xiewei generals," not only the rank of general, but also honors and medals. On April 16, Sun appointed Shum as the commander-in-chief of the Gui army. On the same day, Shum announced his appointment of the Guangdong supervisor by the Beijing government, and led his troops to attack Guangzhou, using Li Yibiao's department as the forward to attack Guanyin Mountain. Sun commanded Yang Ximin of the Dian Army and Liu Zhenhuan of the Gui Army to meet him. On April 19, Shum was forced to withdraw from Guangzhou. On May 22, Sun ordered Shum, Li Yibiao, and Shen Rongguang to be wanted and to revoke their positions. On May 31, Shum led his division back to take control of Guilin.

On January 8, 1924, Shum wrote to Sun to express his loyalty, ambition, and oath to obey orders, hoping to clarify the misunderstanding, allowing him to lead his army back to Guangdong to complete the task of rebelling against the Northern Expedition. On February 23, Shum formally restated his allegiance to Sun. Sun was re-appointed as the commander-in-chief of the Gui army and allocated 20,000 yuan in silver and 100,000 bullets. Sun led his troops back to Guangxi to fight against Lu Rongting. On March 1, Sun appointed Shum as the commander-in-chief of Guangxi. On May 21, 1924, Shum followed Sun's order to return to Guilin and launched a general attack on Lu Rongting. On September 21, Guangxi Commander-in-Chief Shum and generals Deng Youwen, Lu Yungao, etc., sent a telegram to Sun, reporting that he would consecutively defeat of Lu Rongting and Han Caifeng on September 12 and 20 and regain Quanzhou. On the 23rd, Guangxi Commander-in-Chief Shum sent a telegram to Sun again, reporting that after the army had recovered Guilin, it would recover Lingchuan, Xing'an, Quanzhou and other places in that order and asked for further directions.

On January 3, 1925, Shum, Commander-in-Chief of the Founding Army of Guangxi, arrived in Pingle. He gathered four divisions in Xiangxian, Zhongshan, Pingle, and Hexian, and attacked Xunzhou and Wuzhou in three routes. He claimed that he was secretly ordered by Sun Yat-sen to attack Huang Shaohong. Li Zongren and Huang, whose strength had grown after defeating Lu Rongting's various ministries, completed their deployment in late January and advanced on Shum. Although Shum's army had an advantage in strength and equipment, his strategy and tactics were at a disadvantage. His position was defeated steadily. At the end of May 1925, Shum's main force was defeated by a coalition of Li and Huang forces.

== Anecdotes ==
When he was a general in mainland China, Shum bought extensive land in Hong Kong. When he first arrived in Hong Kong, he bought a property on Caine Road in Central. Li Fulin (李福林), another retired general and friend who was also in Hong Kong, introduced Shum to a Feng Shui master to help find land to buy and to build a residential estate in the New Territories. Shum blessed the land, naming it "Fung Kat Heung" (逢吉鄉), which means "every evil turns good fortune" (逢凶化吉). He established the village of Fung Kat Heung in Yuen Long, Hong Kong in 1926. The Shum clan settled in Kam Tin, with Fung Kat Heung north of Sha Po Tsuen. In his retirement, Shum built a large estate there with a mansion and farmlands. Shum had seven wives, nine sons, and nine daughters. They lived together in the General House. Each wife had her own living quarters for herself and her children. In his later years, he converted to Buddhism, studying under the monk Mau Fung (茂峰法師) at the Tung Po Tor Monastery in Lo Wai, Tseun Wan District. He was a member of the Board of Directors of Pok Oi Hospital in 1932 and 1933 and its Chairman in 1934.

== Bibliography ==
- Huang, Xiuwei. "Shen Hongying" Institute of Modern History, Chinese Academy of Social Sciences. Biography of People of the Republic of China Vol.7. Zhonghua Book Company. 1993. ISBN 7-101-01052-0.
- Huang, Shaohong. Fifty Memories. Yuelu Publishing House. 1999. ISBN 7-80520-968-5.
- Editor-in-Chief of Huang Zongyan's "Lu Xiting" Thank You Book. Ten Southwest Warlords. Shanghai People's Publishing House. 1993. ISBN 7-208-01642-9.
- Edited by Mo Jijie and Chen Fulin. History of the New Gui Family Vol.1. Guangxi People's Publishing House. 1991. ISBN 7-219-01885-1.
- Edited by Liu Shoulin and others. Chronology of Officials in the Republic of China. Zhonghua Book Company. 1995. ISBN 7-101-01320-1.
