= Spruce Grove =

- City
- City of Spruce Grove
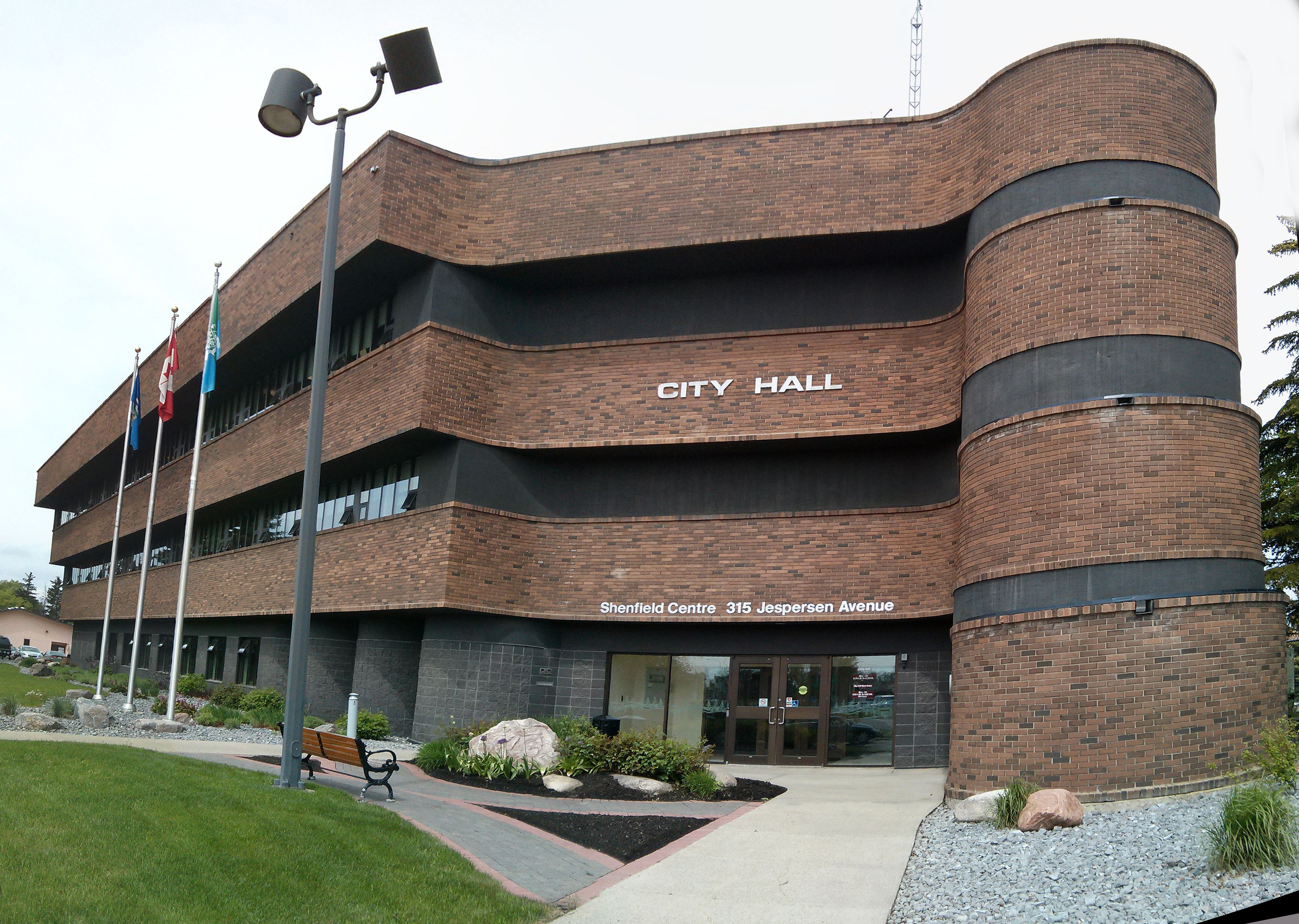
- Spruce Grove City Hall

- Flag

- City boundaries

- Location in Alberta Location in Canada Location in Parkland County
- Coordinates: 53°32′42″N 113°54′03″W
- Country: Canada
- Province: Alberta
- Region: Edmonton Metropolitan Region
- Municipal district: Parkland County
- Incorporated
  - Village: March 14, 1907
  - Dissolution: August 30, 1916
  - Village: January 1, 1955
  - Town: January 1, 1971
  - City: March 1, 1986

Government
  - Mayor: Jeff Acker
  - Council: Council Members: Spencer Bennett; Danielle Carter; Jan Gillett; Brad Mastaler; Erin Stevenson; Jeff Tokar
  - CAO: Dean Screpnek
  - MP: Dane Lloyd
  - MLA: Searle Turton

Area (2021)
  - Land: 37.52 km^{2} (14.49 sq mi)
- Elevation: 709 m (2,326 ft)

Population (2021)
  - Total: 43,582
  - Density: 1,003.3/km^{2} (2,599/sq mi)
  - Municipal census (2016): 33,640
  - Estimate (2020): 38,951
- Demonym: Grovers
- Time zone: UTC−06:00 (Alberta Time)
- Forward sortation areas: T7X - T7Y
- Area codes: 780, 587, 825
- Highways: Highway 16, Highway 16A
- Railways: Canadian National Railway
- Website: sprucegrove.org

Spruce Grove is a city 11 km (6.8 mi) west of Edmonton, Alberta, in Canada. The city is adjacent to the Town of Stony Plain and is surrounded by Parkland County.

With a 2021 population of 37,645, Spruce Grove is the ninth-largest city in Alberta. The mayor of Spruce Grove is Jeff Acker.

Spruce Grove is home to the Horizon Stage Performing Arts Centre, a local theatre, and the TransAlta Tri Leisure Centre, a recreation facility shared with Stony Plain and Parkland County.

Jennifer Heil, the freestyle skier who won the first gold medal for Canada in the 2006 Winter Olympics in Turin, Italy, and a silver medal at the 2010 Winter Olympics is from Spruce Grove, as is Carla MacLeod, a member of the 2010 Canada women's national ice hockey team, and Hockey Hall of Fame member and Stanley Cup-winning goalie Grant Fuhr. Stephanie Labbé, goalkeeper for Canada's 2020 Summer Olympic gold-medal winning women's soccer team, grew up in the Spruce Grove and Stony Plain area and played soccer at Spruce Grove Composite High School.

== History ==
Centuries before European settlement, the Cree and Sarcee people occupied the land that would become Spruce Grove, moving with the seasons.

Homesteaders in the area date back to 1879. Originally the town comprised a general store, livery stables, blacksmith shop, hotel, and the Roman Catholic church.

In 1908 the Grand Trunk Pacific Railway came through Spruce Grove and a station was built. With the establishment of the railway, the community became a busy grain-trading centre.

Spruce Grove was incorporated as a village on March 14, 1907, but it was dissolved on August 30, 1916. Spruce Grove was re-incorporated as a village on January 1, 1955, incorporated as a town on January 1, 1971, and as a city on March 1, 1986.

== Geography ==
Spruce Grove is near the province's geographical centre, at 30 kilometres (19 mi) from downtown Edmonton and 14 km (8.7 mi) from Edmonton's city limits. It is part of the Edmonton Metropolitan Region.

== Demographics ==
Federal census population history
Year	Pop.	±%
1911	16	—
1916	23	+43.8%
1931	76	+230.4%
1941	160	+110.5%
1951	227	+41.9%
1956	309	+36.1%
1961	456	+47.6%
1966	598	+31.1%
1971	3,029	+406.5%
1976	6,907	+128.0%
1981	10,326	+49.5%
1986	11,918	+15.4%
1991	12,908	+8.3%
1996	14,271	+10.6%
2001	15,983	+12.0%
2006	19,496	+22.0%
2011	26,171	+34.2%
2016	34,066	+30.2%
2021	37,645	+10.5%
Source: Statistics Canada

In the 2021 Census of Population conducted by Statistics Canada, the City of Spruce Grove had a population of 37,645 living in 14,273 of its 14,752 total private dwellings, a change of 10.4% from its 2016 population of 34,108. With a land area of 37.52 km^{2} (14.49 sq mi), it had a population density of 1,003.3/km^{2} (2,598.6/sq mi) in 2021.

The population of the City of according to its 2017 municipal census is 34,881, a change of 3.7% from its 2016 municipal census population of 33,640.

In the 2016 Census of Population conducted by Statistics Canada, the City of Spruce Grove had a population of 34,066 living in 12,552 of its 13,109 total private dwellings, a change of 30.2% from its 2011 population of 26,171. With a land area of 32.2 km^{2} (12.4 sq mi), it had a population density of 1,058.0/km^{2} (2,740.1/sq mi) in 2016.

=== Ethnicity ===
Panethnic groups in the City of Spruce Grove (2001−2021)
Panethnic group	2021		2016		2011		2006		2001	
Panethnic group	Pop.	%	Pop.	%	Pop.	%	Pop.	%	Pop.	%
European (Note: Statistic includes all persons that did not make up part of a visible minority or an indigenous identity.)	30,475	81.33%	29,100	86.2%	23,300	89.62%	18,150	93.65%	14,915	93.51%
Indigenous	3,330	8.89%	2,620	7.76%	1,620	6.23%	790	4.08%	660	4.14%
Southeast Asian (Note: Statistic includes total responses of "Filipino" and "Southeast Asian" under visible minority section on census.)	1,495	3.99%	925	2.74%	285	1.1%	35	0.18%	60	0.38%
South Asian	700	1.87%	275	0.81%	220	0.85%	65	0.34%	0	0%
African	685	1.83%	245	0.73%	160	0.62%	100	0.52%	90	0.56%
East Asian (Note: Statistic includes total responses of "Chinese", "Korean", and "Japanese" under visible minority section on census.)	330	0.88%	180	0.53%	205	0.79%	100	0.52%	160	1%
Latin American	275	0.73%	195	0.58%	140	0.54%	45	0.23%	10	0.06%
Middle Eastern (Note: Statistic includes total responses of "West Asian" and "Arab" under visible minority section on census.)	50	0.13%	160	0.47%	0	0%	40	0.21%	25	0.16%
Other/multiracial (Note: Statistic includes total responses of "Visible minority, n.i.e." and "Multiple visible minorities" under visible minority section on census.)	125	0.33%	60	0.18%	40	0.15%	45	0.23%	30	0.19%
Total responses	37,470	99.54%	33,760	98.98%	26,000	99.35%	19,380	99.41%	15,950	99.79%
Total population	37,645	100%	34,108	100%	26,171	100%	19,496	100%	15,983	100%
Note: Totals greater than 100% due to multiple origin responses

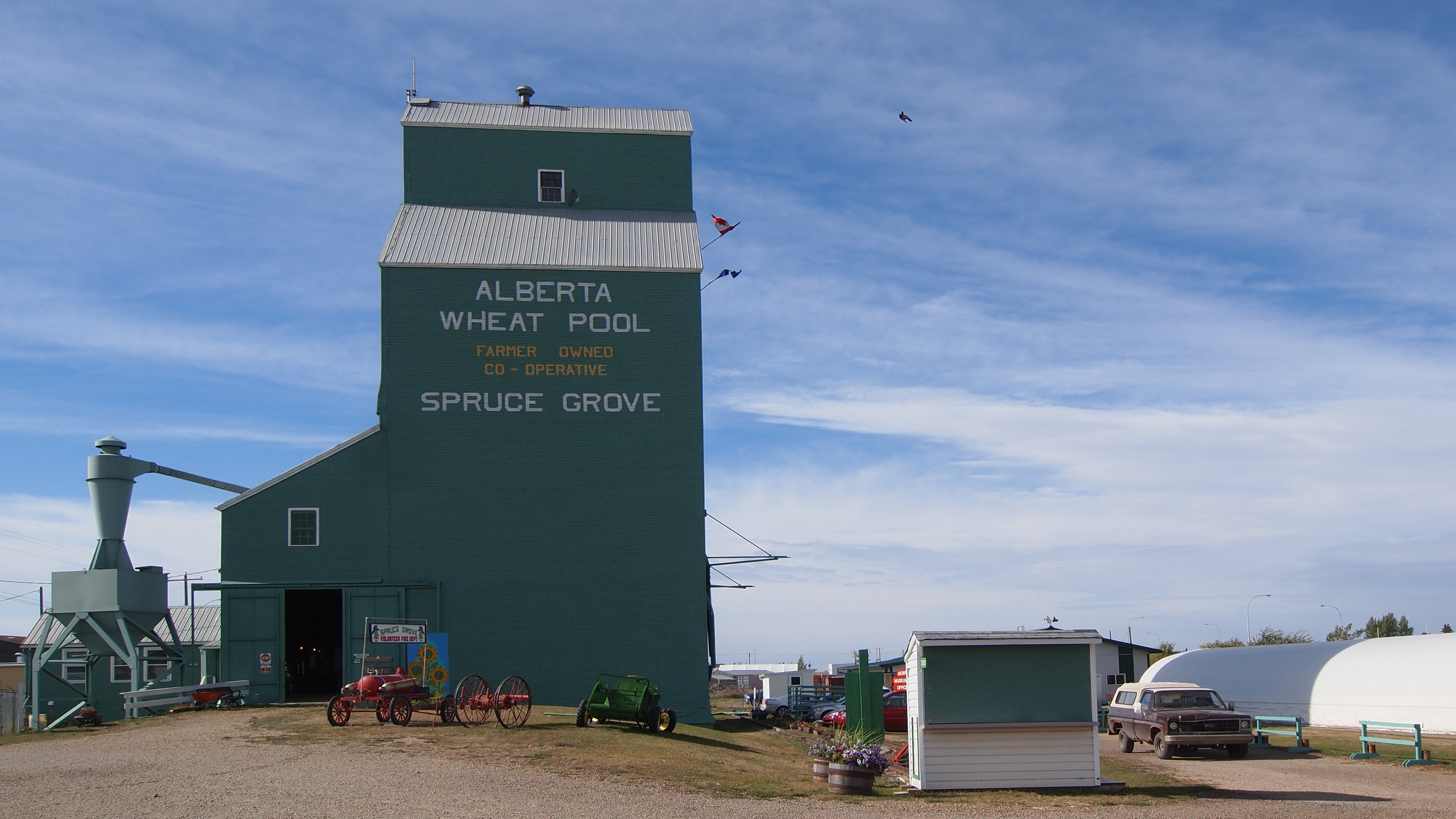
Grain elevator in Spruce Grove

== Arts and culture ==
The Spruce Grove Art Gallery is in the Melcor Cultural Centre and is operated by the Allied Arts Council of Spruce Grove. The gallery hosts ongoing shows for original art created by its members, made up of artists from mainly the Spruce Grove, Stony Plain and Parkland County area.

Horizon Stage hosts many plays and acts throughout the year, as well as a lot of community theatre. As of 2026 a new high school is being built with plans to demolish the current one in which Horizon Stage is currently located. This likley means that there will be a new theatre contained within the new high school. Spruce Grove also has a seven-screen theatre complex which opened in the fall of 2007. The Spruce Grove Grain Elevator Museum is another cultural facility in the city. On May 10, 2025, Heavy Metal Place was opened in Spruce Grove, containing a small theatre, and becoming the new home of the Spruce Grove Saints, who are a member of the British Columbia Hockey League.

== Attractions ==
The TransAlta Tri Leisure Centre, opened in 2002, provides a pool, soccer fields, a gymnasium, workout gym, and ice rinks to the people of Parkland County. Spruce Grove has bike trails winding throughout the city, called the Heritage Grove Trail, where bike riders can ride for hours through lush forest. On June 7, 2008, Spruce Grove held the grand opening of the West District Park, which features two full artificial surface fields for football, soccer and other activities. The Edmonton Elks donated $10,000 towards the event and held practice at the facility as part of the first-day activities.

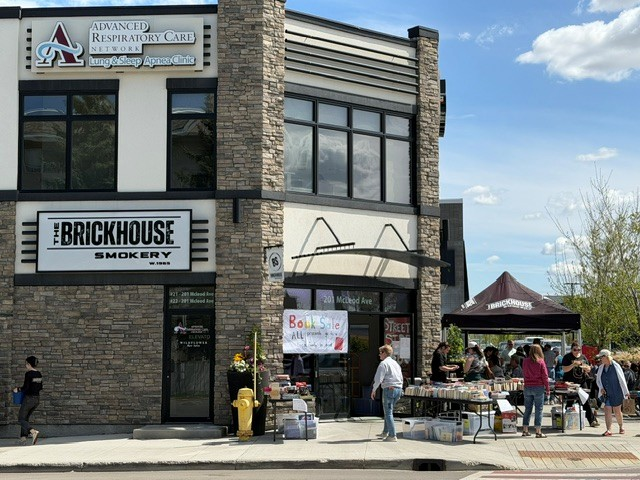
Spruce Grove's City Centre has a mix of retail storefronts and offices.

== Sports ==
Spruce Grove has youths and adults involved in amateur sports that run year round. Box lacrosse runs from March to July under the organization Parkland Posse, which pulls young people from the communities of Spruce Grove, Stony Plain and Parkland County. Hockey runs from September to April, soccer and rugby run from May to October, Canadian football runs from July to December and baseball runs from March to October. The Spruce Grove Saints are a junior hockey team that play in the British Columbia Hockey League.

The TransAlta Tri Leisure Centre is an activity centre formed as a union between the municipalities of Parkland County, Stony Plain and Spruce Grove. It is in the west end of Spruce Grove. The centre was opened to the public by Premier Ralph Klein on September 18, 2002. As of 2026, the Energy City Metro Ballpark is under construction. Upon completion, it will become the home stadium of the Energy City Cactus Rats.

== Infrastructure ==
=== Transportation ===
The City’s 2024 Integrated Transportation Master Plan describes a hierarchy of roadways. The hierarchy descends from provincial highway, urban highway, arterial, collector, to local. Two highways pass through Spruce Grove – Highway 16 (Yellowhead Highway) and Highway 16A. Highway 16 has no traffic lights but has two exits into Spruce Grove, while Highway 16A has several intersections. Travelling east on either of these highways leads to Edmonton. Travelling west on Highway 16A leads to Stony Plain, and going west on either highway leads to Edson, Hinton, and eventually Jasper.

Spruce Grove Transit operated by Edmonton Transit Service offers a commuter transit route from Spruce Grove including the Spruce Grove Transit Centre to Edmonton, peak hours only. There is also a local transit service run by the city for transportation within the city boundaries. The City partners with neighbouring municipalities Parkland County and Town of Stony Plain to offer an on-demand transit service operates seven days a week at over 500 locations around the region.

=== Education ===
Public schools

Spruce Grove is part of the Parkland School Division No. 70. The following public schools are in Spruce Grove.

- Brookwood School
- Copperhaven School
- École Broxton Park School
- Greystone Centennial Middle School
- Millgrove School
- Parkland Village School
- Spruce Grove Composite High School
- Woodhaven 5-9 School
- Prescott Learning Centre

Separate schools

Spruce Grove is part of the Evergreen Catholic Separate School Division. The following separate schools are in Spruce Grove.

- St. Joseph's Catholic School
- St. Marguerite Catholic School
- St. Peter the Apostle Catholic High School
- St. Thomas Aquinas Catholic School

Private schools

- Living Waters Christian Academy

== Media ==
Spruce Grove receives almost all of its print, radio, and television media from Edmonton. However, Spruce Grove has its own weekly newspaper, the Spruce Grove Examiner, delivered to all homes every Friday. The newspaper holds almost exclusively local news. The area has a radio station, 88.1 The One is dedicated to Spruce Grove, Stony Plain, and the area.

== Notable people ==
- Stu Barnes (former NHL centre)
- Nathan Dempsey (former NHL defenceman)
- Grant Fuhr (former NHL goalie, member of the Hockey Hall of Fame)
- Jennifer Heil (former Olympic moguls skier)
- Mark Korte (professional Canadian football player)
- Stephanie Labbé (former professional goalie in soccer and Olympic gold medalist)
- Justin Lawrence (professional Canadian football player)
- Carla MacLeod (former Olympic hockey player)
- Kelly Perlette (former gold medal boxer in the Commonwealth Games)
- Howie Schumm and Herb Schumm (brothers, both former professional Canadian football players)
- Ben Scrivens (former NHL goalie)
- Keith Shologan (professional NFL player with the San Diego Chargers and Canadian football player)
- Grant Stevenson (former NHL player with the San Jose Sharks)
- Reid Schaefer (professional hockey player with the Milwaukee Admirals)

== See also ==
- List of cities in Canada
