= Shum, Pakistan =

Shum
- Town and union council
- Country: Pakistan
- Region: Balochistan
- District: Dera Bugti District
- Time zone: UTC+5 (PST)

Shum is a town and union council of the Dera Bugti District in the Balochistan province of Pakistan.
