= Tung Po Tor Monastery =

Buddhist monastery in Lo Wai, Hong Kong

Coordinates: 22.379220°N 114.127074°E

- 東普陀講寺
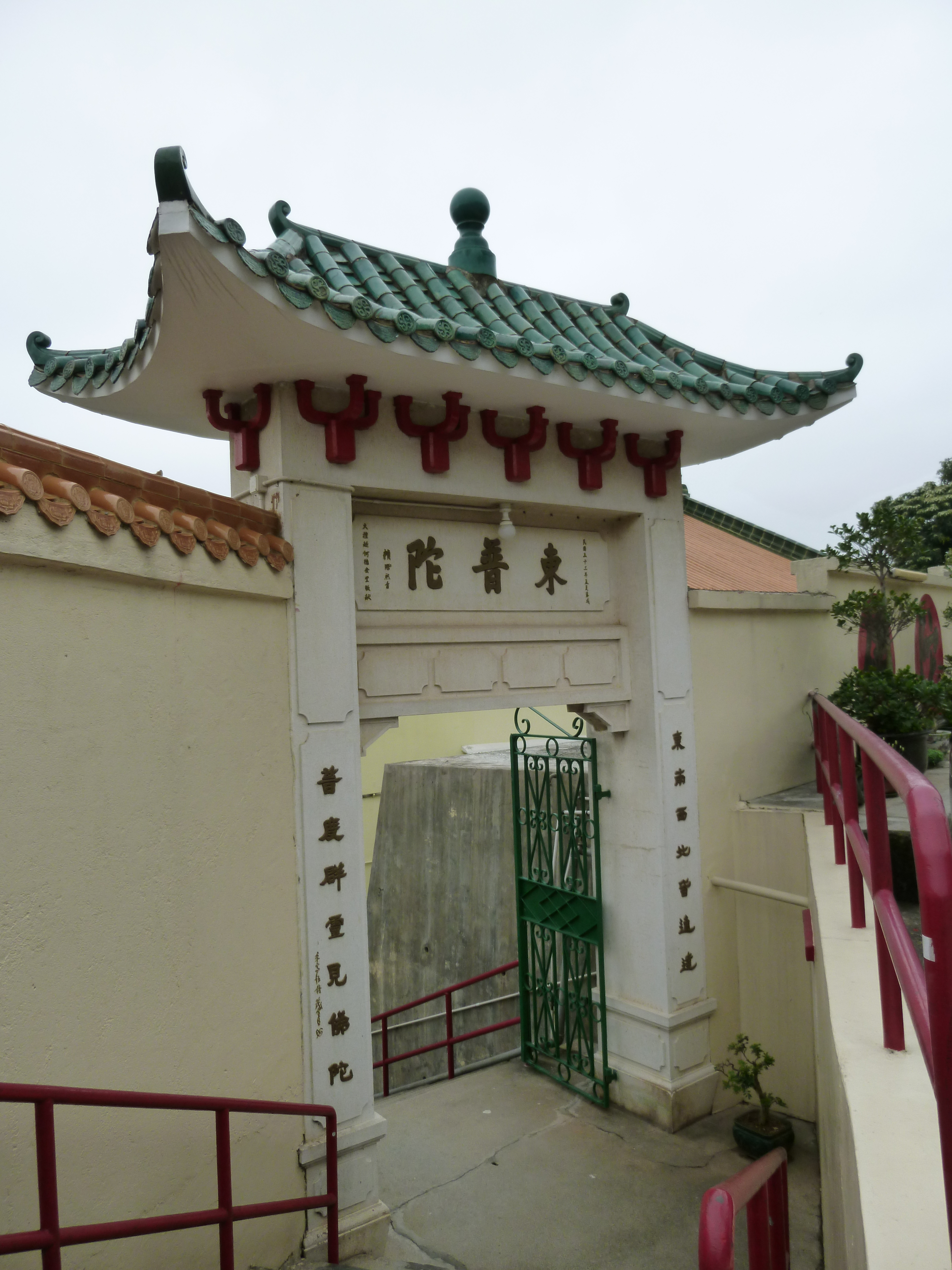
- Entrance gate of Tung Po Tor Monastery
- Interactive map of Tung Po Tor Monastery

Monastery information
- Order: Buddhist
- Established: 1932; 94 years ago

Architecture
- Heritage designation: Grade II historic building
- Designated date: 16 April 2010; 16 years ago

Site
- Location: Lo Wai, Hong Kong

Tung Po Tor Monastery
- Traditional Chinese: 東普陀講寺
Transcriptions
Standard Mandarin
- Hanyu Pinyin: Dōng Pǔ Tuó Jiǎng Sì
Yue: Cantonese
- Yale Romanization: Dūng póu tòh góng jih
- Jyutping: Dung1 pou2 to4 gong2 zi6
- IPA: [tʷūŋ pʰʷǔːtʰʷóː 講 tɕǎŋ sz̩̀ː]

Hong Kong Graded Building – Grade II

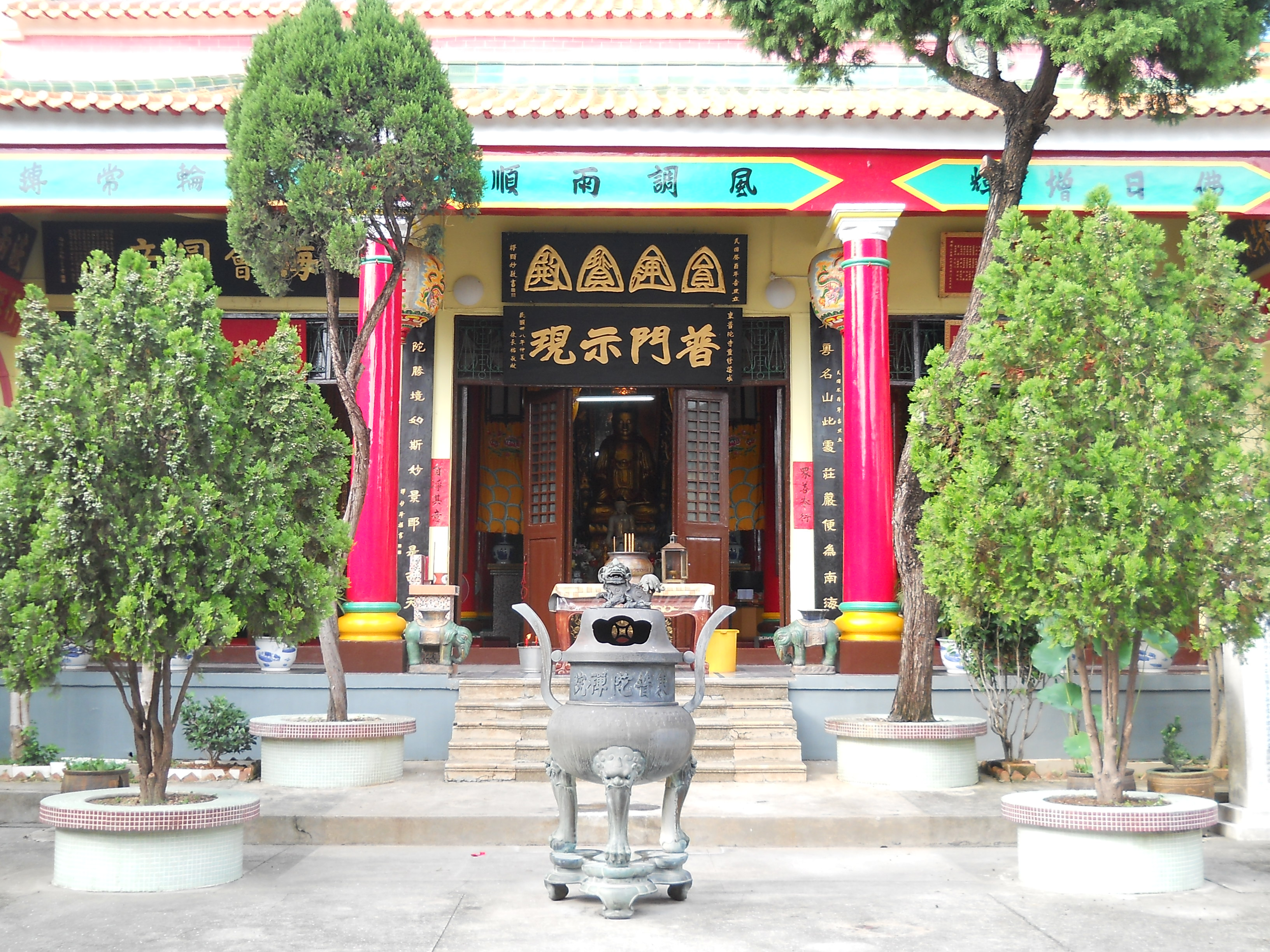
Yuen Tung Po Din in Tung Po Tor Monastery

The Tung Po Tor Monastery is situated at the foot of Tin Fat Shan in Lo Wai, Tsuen Wan, Hong Kong. Parts of the monastery are listed as Grade II historic buildings.

== History ==
The Tung Po Tor Monastery was founded in 1932 by the Buddhist Mau Fung for the worship of the Kwun Yum (Goddess of Mercy) including a main hall called Yuen Tung Po Din (Chinese: 圓通寶殿) and an entrance hall called Tin Wong Din (Chinese: 天王殿) separated by an open courtyard in between. There is a big bronze tripod in front of its main hall and the place on which the tripod stands was made in a blast during the Sino-Japanese War. The articles used by Mau Fung and the yellow sateen, the Five Garments and the Bag given by the Emperor of Japan are in display in the Memorial Hall. The temple also displays a statue of a Buddhist medical practitioner that is cast in ancient bronze in the Ming Dynasty.

== Architecture ==
The Tin Wong Din (or Wai Tor Din Chinese: 韋馱殿) is a building in front of the Yuen Tung Bo Din building. It is also a two-storey building constructed of concrete and stone with its walls and columns to support its pitched roofs of timber rafters, purlins and clay tiles. Four round columns painted red are arranged in 1:2:1 proportion in the interiors of the building. The external walls are plastered and painted in earth yellow colour. An altar in the middle of the ground floor hall houses a statue of Maitreya (Chinese: 彌勒佛) facing the entrance and a statue of Wai Tor (Chinese: 韋馱, Skanda) facing the garden. At the two side platforms are the four standing huge statues of the Four Heavenly Kings (Chinese: 四大天王). The upper floor is a classroom and library for the young monks to study while the ridge of the building is decorated with a pearl and two aoyus (Chinese: 鰲魚).

== Conservation ==
Yuen Tong Po Din, as well as Tin Wong Din and Wai Tor Din, were declared as Grade II historic buildings in April 2010.
