= Lo Wai, Tsuen Wan =

Village of Hong Kong

Coordinates: 22.37952°N 114.12532°E

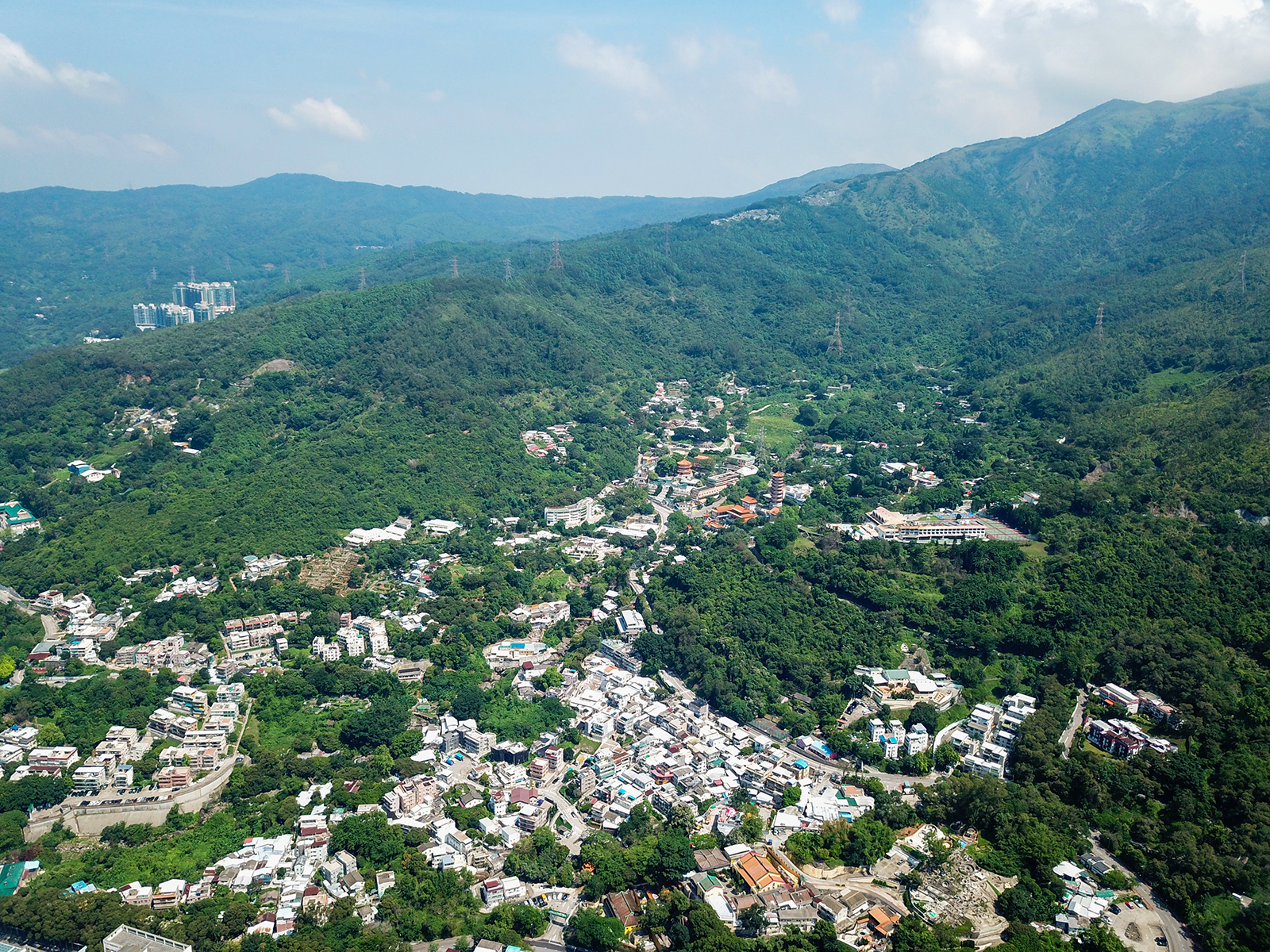
Aerial view of Lo Wai.

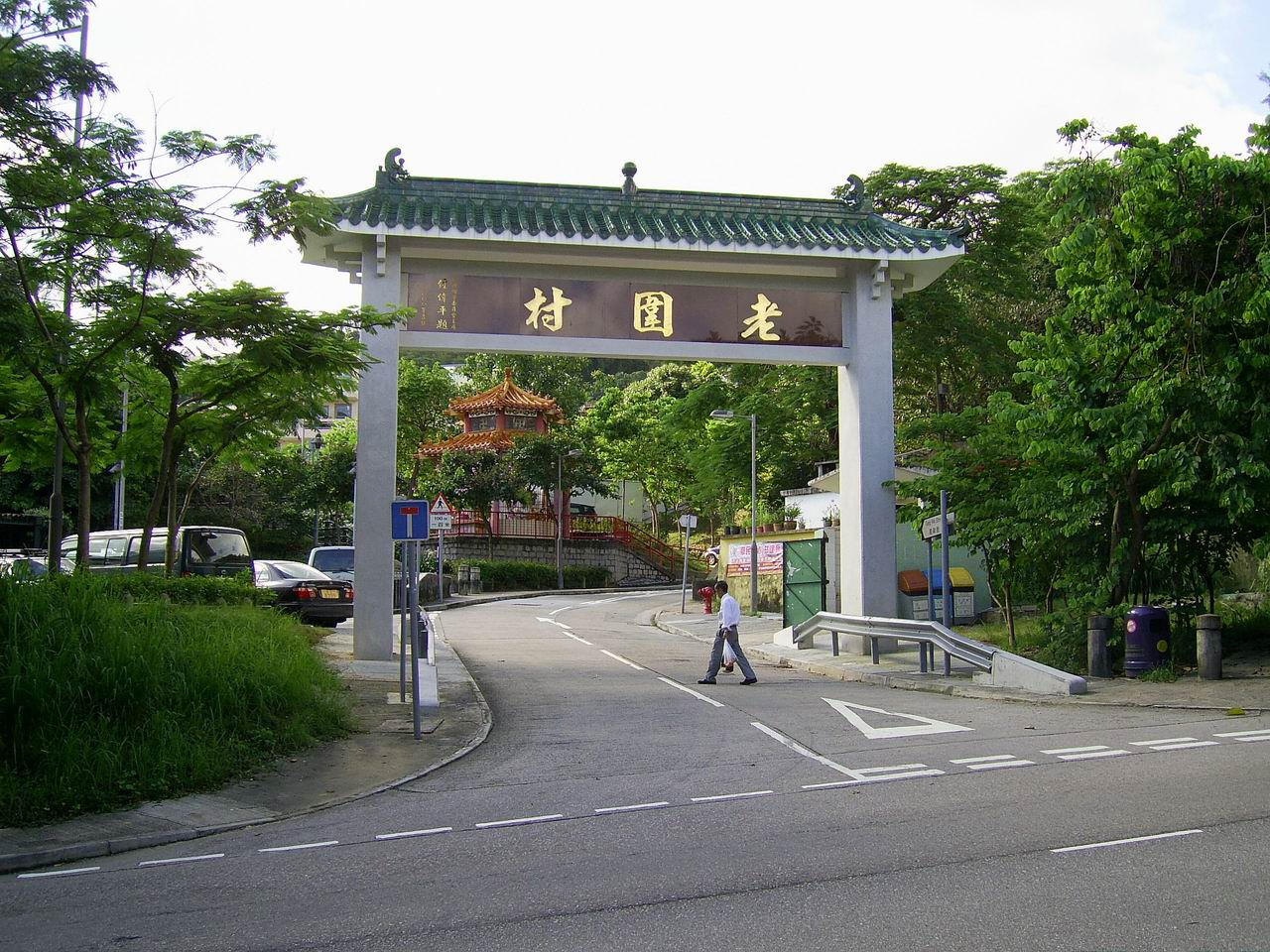
Paifang of Lo Wai.

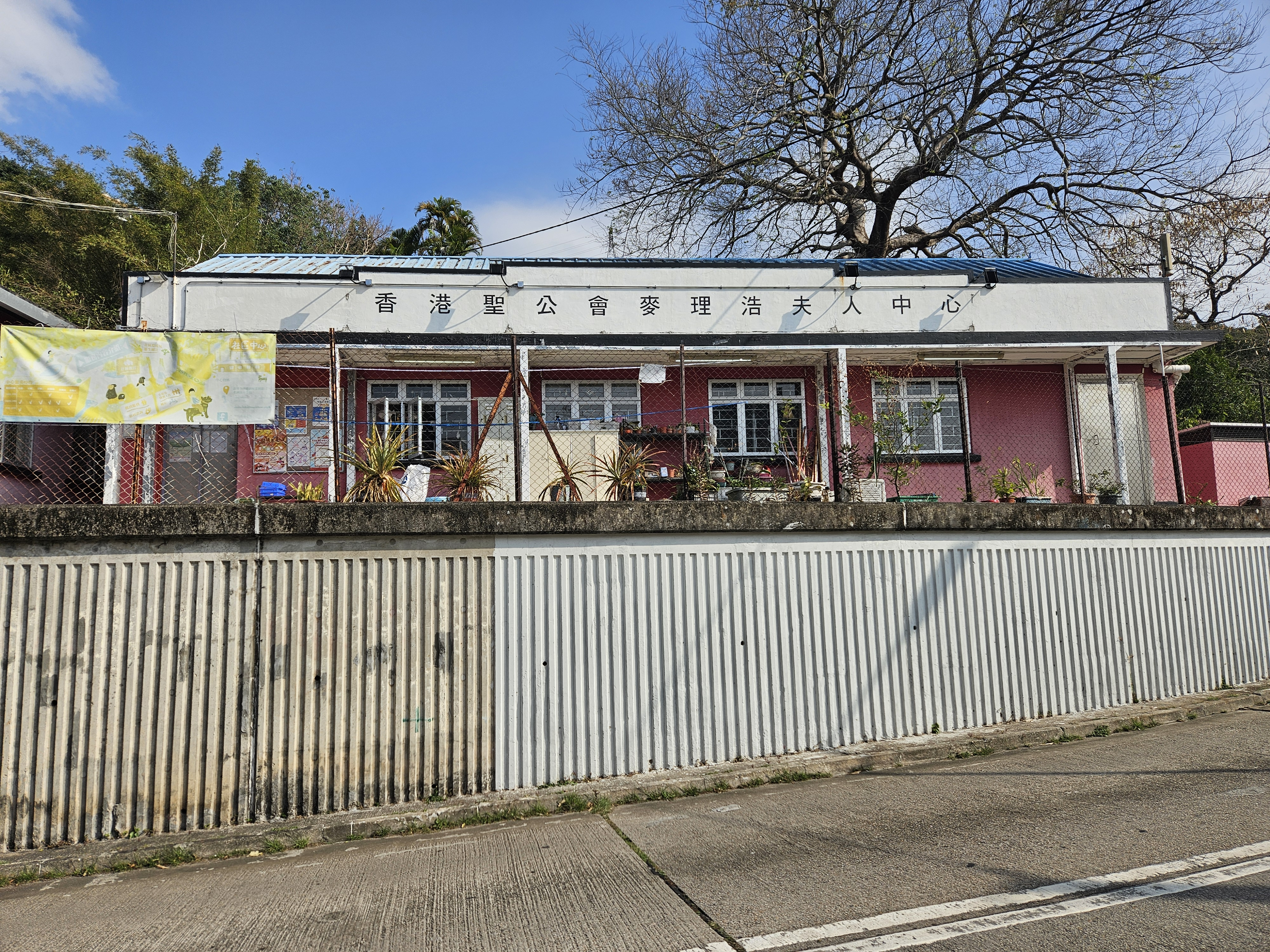
HKSKH Lady MacLehose Centre Lo Wai, housed in the former Lo Wai Public School

Lo Wai (Chinese: 老圍) is a village in Tsuen Wan District, Hong Kong.

== Administration ==
Lo Wai is a recognized village under the New Territories Small House Policy.

== History ==
Both the original Shek Wai Kok and Lo Wai villages have been described as the oldest villages of Tsuen Wan.

== See also ==
- Tung Po Tor Monastery, a buddhist monastery in Lo Wai
- Yuen Yuen Institute, a Taoist temple in Lo Wai
