= Herb Schumm =

Canadian football player

No. 52 (CGY)
- Positions: Guard, Defensive tackle

Personal information
- Born: September 11, 1942; Spruce Grove, Alberta, Canada
- Died: June 28, 1985 (aged 42); Calgary, Alberta, Canada
- Listed height: 6 ft 2 in (1.88 m)
- Listed weight: 220 lb (100 kg)

Career information
- CJFL: Edmonton Wildcats

Career history
- 1963–1965: Edmonton Eskimos
- 1967–1973: Calgary Stampeders

Awards and highlights
- Grey Cup champion (1971)

Herb Schumm (September 11, 1942 – June 28, 1985) was a Canadian professional football player with the Canadian Football League's Edmonton Eskimos and the Calgary Stampeders. Schumm spent his entire 10-year CFL career as an offensive lineman and defensive lineman for the Eskimos and Stampeders. He was a part of the Stampeders Grey Cup victory in 1971. His brother Howie Schumm also played in the CFL.
