= Howie Schumm =

Canadian football player (1940–2015)

Profile
- Positions: Linebacker, Fullback

Personal information
- Born: March 11, 1940; Spruce Grove, Alberta
- Died: April 4, 2015 (aged 75); Stony Plain, Alberta
- Listed height: 6 ft 2 in (1.88 m)
- Listed weight: 220 lb (100 kg)

Career information
- CJFL: Edmonton Wildcats

Career history
- 1959–1969: Edmonton Eskimos
- 1969: Calgary Stampeders
- 1970–1972: Edmonton Eskimos

John "Howie" Schumm (March 11, 1940 – April 4, 2015) was a Canadian professional football player who played in the Canadian Football League for the Edmonton Eskimos and the Calgary Stampeders. Schumm spent his 14-year CFL career as a linebacker and fullback for the Eskimos and Stampeders. On defense, he intercepted 12 passes, including 2 for touchdowns, and recovered 5 fumbles. On offense, he was mostly a blocker, with his best rushing season occurring in 1961, during which he gained only 86 yards. He was also a punt and kick returner, notably returning 47 punts for 250 yards (5.3 average) in 1964 and 50 punts for 199 yards (4.0 average) in 1965.

Schumm was remarkably durable, not missing a single game during the first 8 years of his career, from 1959 to 1966. His brother, Herb Schumm, also played in the CFL. He died of cancer in 2015.
