= Alberta Highway 16 =

Highway in Alberta

Highway 16
- Yellowhead Highway; Trans-Canada Highway
- Highway 16 highlighted in red, former sections highlighted in brown

Route information
- Maintained by the Ministry of Transportation and Economic Corridors
- Length: 633.5 km (393.6 mi)

Major junctions
- West end: Highway 16 (TCH) at British Columbia border at Yellowhead Pass
- Highway 93 in Jasper; Highway 22 near Evansburg; Highway 43 at Manly Corner; Highway 216 in Edmonton; Highway 2 in Edmonton; Highway 28 in Edmonton; Highway 15 in Edmonton and near Mundare; Highway 21 in Sherwood Park; Highway 36 near Lavoy; Highway 41 at Vermilion; Highway 17 in Lloydminster
- East end: Highway 16 (TCH) at Saskatchewan border in Lloydminster

Location
- Country: Canada
- Province: Alberta
- Specialized and rural municipalities: Jasper, I.D. No. 12, Yellowhead, Parkland, Strathcona, I.D. No. 13, Lamont, Minburn, Vermilion River
- Major cities: Spruce Grove, Edmonton, Sherwood Park, Lloydminster
- Towns: Hinton, Edson, Vegreville, Vermilion
- Villages: Wabamun, Innisfree, Mannville, Kitscoty

Highway system
- Alberta Numbered Highway Network; List; Former
← Highway 15	→ Highway 16A

Highway 16 is a major east–west highway in central Alberta, Canada, which connects Jasper with Lloydminster via Edmonton. It forms a portion of the Yellowhead Highway, a major interprovincial route of the Trans-Canada Highway system that stretches from Masset, British Columbia, on Graham Island, to the main Trans-Canada Highway (Highway 1) west of Portage la Prairie, Manitoba, near Winnipeg. Highway 16 spans approximately 634 kilometres (394 mi) from Alberta's border with British Columbia in the west to its border with Saskatchewan in the east. As of 2010, all but less than 96 kilometres (60 mi) of the route was divided, with a minimum of two lanes in each direction. It is designated a core route in Canada's National Highway System.

== Route description ==
=== Jasper National Park ===
British Columbia Highway 16 becomes Alberta Highway 16 as it crosses the Continental Divide and Yellowhead Pass into Alberta, entering Jasper National Park, which was established in 1907 and encompasses 10,878 square kilometres (4,200 sq mi) of mountain terrain as part of the Canadian Rocky Mountain Parks UNESCO World Heritage Site, inscribed in 1984. The highway travels in an easterly direction through the Municipality of Jasper until it reaches the intersection with Highway 93 (Icefields Parkway) and the west access to the Jasper townsite. East of Highway 93, the highway turns to the north, passes the east access to the Jasper townsite, and continues in a northeast direction along the Athabasca River through Improvement District No. 12. The segment of Highway 16 through Jasper National Park is maintained by the Government of Canada.

=== Jasper National Park to Edmonton ===
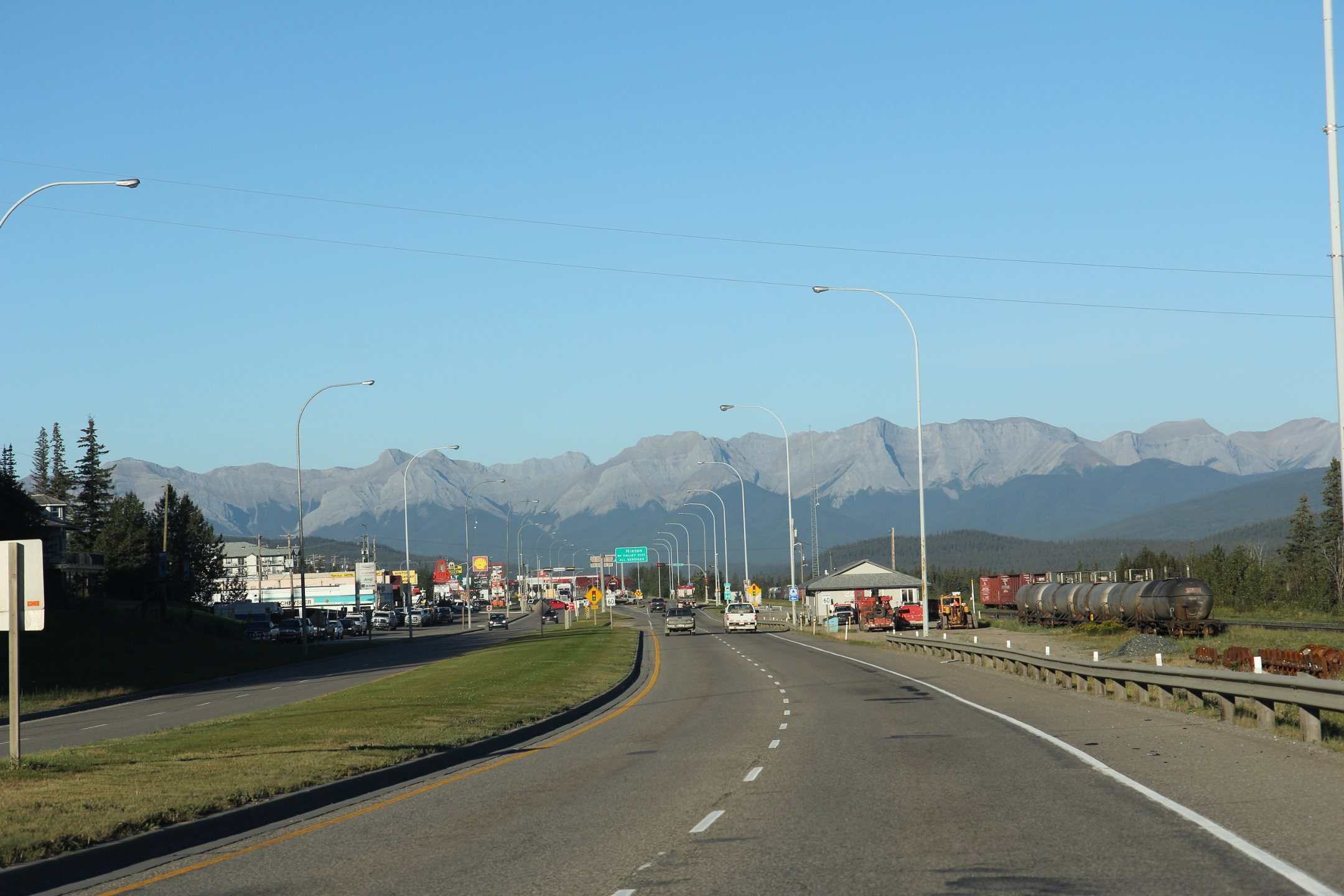
Westbound Highway 16 in Hinton

Upon exiting Jasper National Park, Highway 16 travels through the rural municipalities of Yellowhead County and Parkland County and is maintained by Alberta Transportation until it reaches Alberta's capital city, Edmonton. The highway is a two-lane, undivided highway for 19 kilometres (12 mi), where it becomes a four-lane, divided highway. The highway continues northeast through the Town of Hinton, the largest community on the highway between Edmonton and Jasper National Park. Hinton was incorporated in 1958 and named for William P. Hinton, a senior official of the Grand Trunk Pacific Railway. Alberta's first pulp mill opened in Hinton in 1957 and pulp and paper manufacturing remains the town's dominant industry. The highway continues east to the locality of Obed, where it crosses Obed Summit, the highest point on the Yellowhead Highway.

The highway passes through the Town of Edson, where the highway splits into parallel one-streets, with eastbound traffic following 2 Avenue and westbound traffic following 4 Avenue. Edson, incorporated in 1911, was named for Edson Joseph Chamberlin, the general manager of the Grand Trunk Pacific Railway during its construction. It continues east where it passes by the Hamlets of Niton Junction, Wildwood, Evansburg, and Entwistle. The highway crosses the Arctic Divide between Entwistle (which is on the Pembina River) and Magnolia Bridge (on the Sturgeon River).

It then passes through the Hamlet of Gainford and north of Wabamun Lake, where it passes by the Summer Village of Seba Beach, Hamlet of Fallis, Hamlet of Wabamun, and Hamlet of Kapasiwin before intersecting Highway 43. The highway intersects Highway 16A (Parkland Highway), which prior to 1997 was part of Highway 16, and passes through the Town of Stony Plain, City of Spruce Grove, and serves as an alternate route into Edmonton. The present alignment bypasses Stony Plain and serves as the northern boundary of Spruce Grove. Highway 16 is part of the CANAMEX Corridor between Highway 43 and its western intersection with Anthony Henday Drive, Edmonton's ring road.

=== Edmonton ===
Highway 16 passes through Edmonton as a major expressway called Yellowhead Trail, maintained by the City of Edmonton. Most sections of Yellowhead Trail are free-flowing, while a few intersections still exist from 127 Street to 66 Street as of 2024. The city closed access to Yellowhead Trail from 89 Street in 2019, marking the first milestone of the Freeway Conversion Program.

=== Edmonton to Lloydminster ===
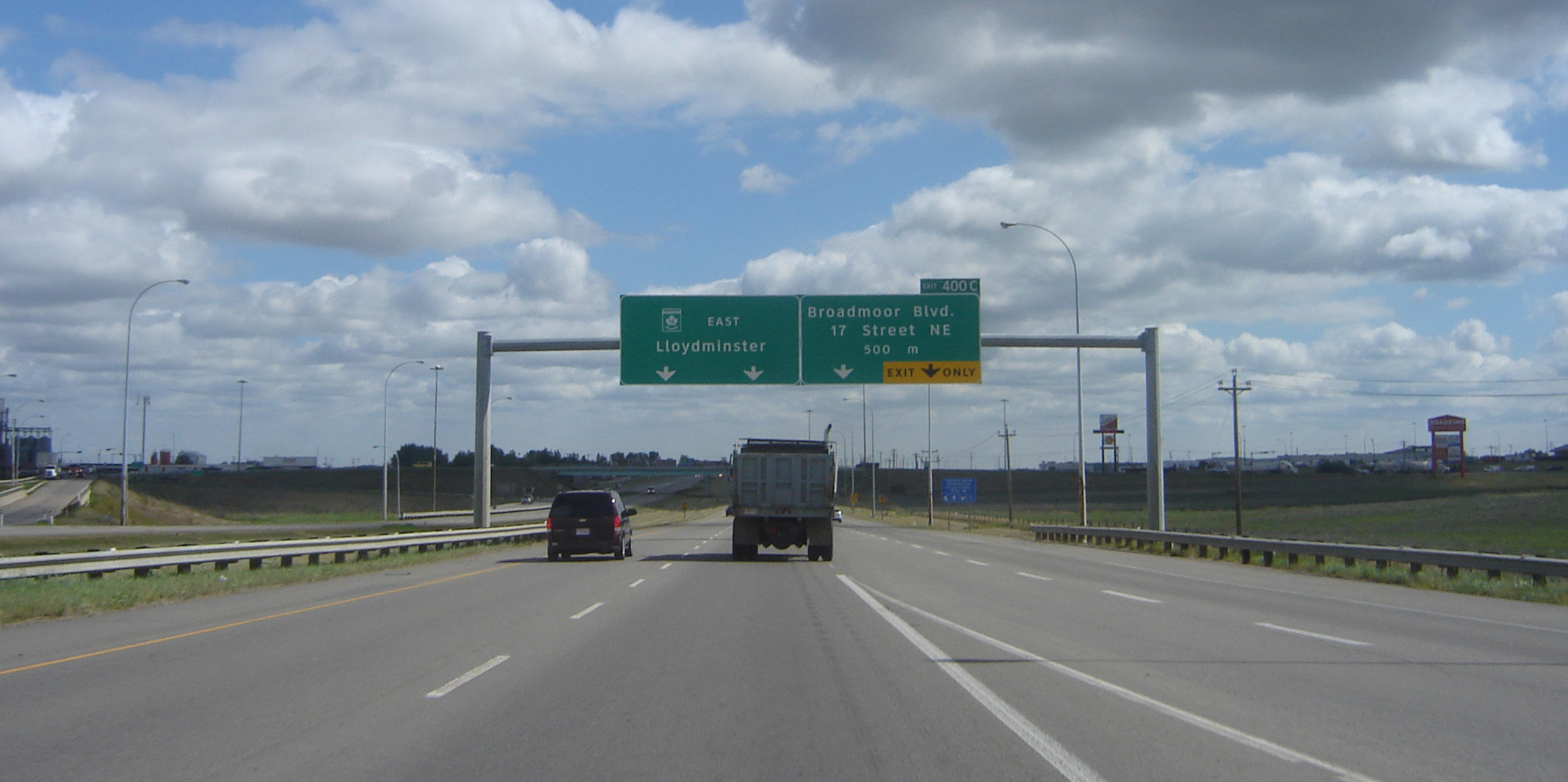
Exit 400C Highway 16 east Lloydminster, Broadmoor Blvd

Highway 16 exits Edmonton and enters Strathcona County just west of its eastern intersection with Anthony Henday Drive (Highway 216). The highway travels east and serves as the division between Edmonton and the Urban Service Area of Sherwood Park. The highway continues east past the Hamlet of Ardrossan and through Elk Island National Park. The park was established as a wildlife reserve in 1906 and designated a national park in 1913; it covers 194 square kilometres (75 sq mi) approximately 48 kilometres (30 mi) east of Edmonton. It is the only completely fenced national park in Canada, protecting herds of plains bison and wood bison along with moose, elk, and over 230 bird species. East of the park, the highway passes the Ukrainian Cultural Heritage Village, founded in 1971 and designated a provincial Historic Site in 1975. The site interprets Ukrainian settlement in east-central Alberta between 1892 and 1930 through over 30 restored historic structures staffed by costumed interpreters. The highway then passes through the rural municipalities of Lamont County, County of Minburn, and the County of Vermilion River. The highway continues in a general southeast direction by Town of Mundare and the Town of Vegreville, where Highway 16A passes directly through Vegreville. Vegreville is home to a 31 feet (9 m) pysanka sculpture, built in 1973–74 to mark the centennial of the Royal Canadian Mounted Police. The highway continues by Hamlet of Lavoy, Hamlet of Ranfurly, Village of Innisfree, Hamlet of Minburn, Village of Mannville, Town of Vermilion, Village of Kitscoty, and Hamlet of Blackfoot. The highway is maintained by Alberta Transportation, with the exception of the segment through Elk Island National Park which is maintained by the Government of Canada. Highway 16 passes through the City of Lloydminster along Ray Nelson Drive (44 Street) and is maintained by the City of Lloydminster. Lloydminster was established in April 1903 by British immigrants led by Reverend George Exton Lloyd, whose name the settlement bears. When Alberta and Saskatchewan were created as provinces in 1905, the interprovincial boundary bisected the settlement; the two portions amalgamated into a single municipality in 1930 and achieved city status in 1958. Highway 16 is an arterial street; eventually, the highway crosses into Saskatchewan at its intersection with Highway 17 (50 Avenue), where it becomes Saskatchewan Highway 16.

== History ==
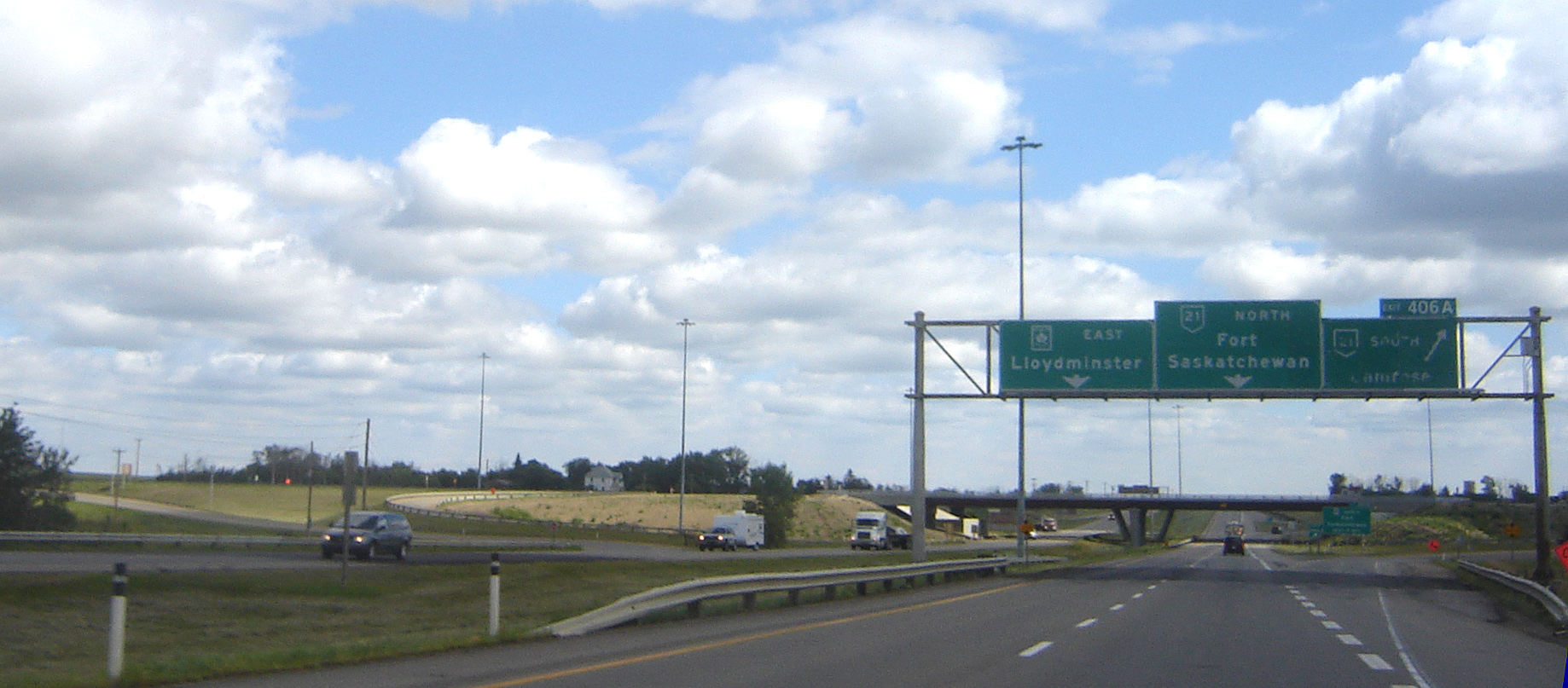
Alberta Highway 16 and Highway 21 interchange

The Yellowhead Highway is named after the Yellowhead Pass in the Rocky Mountains. During the early 1800s, Pierre Bostonais, an Iroquois-Métis trapper with streaks of blonde in his hair, worked for the Hudson's Bay Company. Because of his hair colour, French-speaking voyageurs referred to him as "Tête Jaune", literally "Yellow Head". By 1819, Bostonais acted as a guide for the company and had explored a route down the Fraser River to the present city of Prince George. Nearly a century later, the Grand Trunk Pacific (GTP) and Canadian Northern Railway (CNoR) constructed lines that the Yellowhead Highway later paralleled. The two lines between Lobstick and Red Pass Junction were combined into a joint route in 1917, with portions of both lines abandoned. The GTP and CNoR both became part of the new Canadian National Railway (CNR) by 1924.

Following World War I, as automobile use increased exponentially, CNR surveyor Fred Driscoll and Edmonton Automobile and Good Roads Association president formed a committee lobbying for the creation of the Yellowhead Highway. Driscoll believed the abandoned railway bed would be an ideal base for a road. The Edmonton Automobile Association offered a gold medal to the first person to travel from Edmonton to Victoria through the gap. Charles Neiymer and Frank Silverthorne, sponsored by Lines Motors of Edmonton, departed in an Overland Four on June 17, 1922. The following week, George Gordon and J. Sims departed Edmonton in a Ford Model T, following the same route. On July 4, both pairs arrived in Victoria and were each awarded gold medals.

However, it would take until World War II for any improvements to be made this overland route. The displacement of Japanese-Canadians from the Pacific coast to internment camps in the interior led to some developments. 30 km (19 mi) of road was constructed along the railway bed, and an additional 40 km (25 mi) through steep terrain. By 1944, the Tote Road was opened through Jasper and into the Fraser Valley.

In August 1948, a motorcade was organized as a demonstration of the need for the highway. The Trans-Canada Highway Act was enacted in 1949, providing a 90% subsidy to upgrade selected routes to modern standards. However, the Tote Highway was not included under this subsidy. During the same time frame, the Trans Mountain Oil Pipe Line Company began looking at the Tote Road as a potential route for a pipeline between Edmonton and Vancouver. Construction began in 1952, and largely resulted in the destruction of the road along the pipeline's path.

Gradually, work progressed to reconstruct the highway. Elsewhere, the main route of the Trans-Canada Highway was completed in 1957. The Yellowhead Highway became eligible for federal funding soon thereafter. By 1969, the Tote Road was generally rebuilt and paved. On August 15, 1970, British Columbia Premier W. A. C. Bennett officially opened the Yellowhead Highway.

== Construction and improvements ==
Alberta Transportation's 2023 provincial construction program included several projects along Highway 16. Bridge rehabilitation work at the Highway 16 and Highway 43 interchange near Carvel was in design, as were culvert replacements on Norris Creek near Mundare and on Rooster Creek near Obed. A corridor planning study for the Highway 16 and Mundare area was also initiated under the program.

The 2024 program included active construction projects on the highway. A 32-kilometre repaving section and a separate 19-kilometre repaving section were under construction between Clover Bar Road and west of Highway 834. An intersection improvement at Highway 16 and Highway 830 was under construction, along with safety upgrades at Range Road intersections 210, 211, 212, 214, and 224 east of Edmonton. In design were 19 kilometres of repaving between Highway 31 and Range Road 34, 13 kilometres near Wabamun, and sections totalling 43 kilometres west of Lloydminster. Bridge deck rehabilitation was in design for structures at the Highway 16 and Highway 43 interchange, the McLeod River bridge near Edson, the Pembina River bridge near Entwistle, the Lobstick River bridge near Niton Junction, the Clover Bar Road interchange, the Switzer Drive flyover at Hinton, and the Wolf Creek and Maskuta Creek bridges near Edson and Hinton. Culvert replacements near Hinton, Obed, Chip Lake, Evansburg, and Kitscoty were also in design. A new overpass at the Highway 16 and Highway 881 intersection was in planning.

== Future ==
Alberta Transportation has conducted long-term studies to twin Highway 16 between Jasper National Park and Highway 40 and freeway upgrades both west and east of Edmonton. Highway bypass alignments have also been planned for Hinton, Edson, and Lloydminster, all of which have been designated as Highway 16X.

Edmonton has plans to convert Yellowhead Trail to a full freeway by adding interchanges at 127 Street and 121 Street and a partial interchange at 66 Street while a frontage road system will run from 156 Street to at least St. Albert Trail. An interchange at 149 Street was considered but was scrapped in favour of the frontage road system for cost and land reasons. Edmonton is widening the freeway from 50 Street to city limits, which is currently two lanes in each direction, to three lanes in each direction, connecting them to the three-lane twin bridges over the North Saskatchewan River – the Beverly Bridge and Clover Bar Bridge. The total project cost is approximately $1 billion, funded by federal, provincial, and municipal governments. Full completion of the freeway conversion is expected by the end of 2027.

== Major intersections ==
The following is a list of major intersections along Alberta Highway 16 from west to east, including exit numbers where applied.

Rural/specialized municipality	Location	km	mi	Exit	Destinations	Notes
Municipality of Jasper (Jasper National Park)		0.0	0.0		Highway 16 (TCH/YH) west – Prince George, Kamloops	Continental Divide; continuation into British Columbia
Municipality of Jasper (Jasper National Park)		0.0	0.0	Yellowhead Pass – 1,131 m (3,711 ft)		
Municipality of Jasper (Jasper National Park)		3.7	2.3	West gate of Jasper National Park		
Municipality of Jasper (Jasper National Park)	Jasper	24.6	15.3		Highway 93 south (Icefields Parkway) / Connaught Drive – Lake Louise, Banff	
Municipality of Jasper (Jasper National Park)	Jasper	25.8	16.0		Highway 93A south / Hazel Avenue	
Municipality of Jasper (Jasper National Park)	Jasper	28.8	17.9		Connaught Drive / Cottonwood Creek Road	
Municipality of Jasper (Jasper National Park)		30.7	19.1		Maligne Road – Jasper Park Lodge, Maligne Lake	
I.D. No. 12 (Jasper National Park)		46.6	29.0	Crosses Athabasca River		
I.D. No. 12 (Jasper National Park)	Pocahontas	69.4	43.1		Miette Hot Springs Road – Miette Hot Springs	
I.D. No. 12 (Jasper National Park)		76.4	47.5	East gate of Jasper National Park		
Yellowhead County		96.6	60.0		Highway 40 north (Big Horn Highway) – Grande Cache, Grande Prairie	West end of Highway 40 concurrency
Hinton		98.5	61.2		Highway 40 south (Big Horn Highway) – Cadomin	East end of Highway 40 concurrency
Hinton		103.2	64.1		Switzer Drive – Hinton Valley District	
Yellowhead County	Obed	125.2	77.8	Obed Summit – 1,163.9 m (3,819 ft)		
Yellowhead County		179.5	111.5	180	Highway 47 south – Robb	Eastbound grade separated; westbound at-grade; future Highway 947 north
Edson		186.4– 191.2	115.8– 118.8	One-way pair		
Edson		193.1	120.0		Highway 748 north (25 Street)	
Yellowhead County		196.5	122.1	Crosses McLeod River		
Yellowhead County		221.7	137.8		Highway 32 north – Peers, Whitecourt	
Yellowhead County	Nojack	247.4	153.7		Highway 751 north – MacKay	
Yellowhead County		258.0	160.3		Highway 753 south – Cynthia, Lodgepole	
Yellowhead County	Wildwood	270.7	168.2			
Yellowhead County		276.9	172.1		Highway 16A east – Evansburg, Entwistle	
Yellowhead County		279.5	173.7		Highway 22 north (Cowboy Trail) – Mayerthorpe	West end of Highway 22 concurrency
Yellowhead County	Evansburg	285.2	177.2		UAR 115 north (Range Road 75)	
↑ / ↓		286.5	178.0	Crosses Pembina River		
Parkland County	Entwistle	287.5	178.6	289	Highway 22 south (Cowboy Trail) – Drayton Valley; Highway 16A west – Entwistle	Interchange; east end of Highway 22 concurrency
Parkland County		296.0	183.9		Highway 757 north – Magnolia, Sangudo	
Parkland County	Gainford	301.1	187.1			
Parkland County		304.4	189.1	306	Highway 31 south to Highway 759 south – Seba Beach, Isle Lake	Interchange
Parkland County		314.0	195.1		Highway 765 north – Darwell	
Parkland County	Wabamun	322.7	200.5	324	Wabamun	Interchange
Parkland County		325.7	202.4	327	Kapasiwin, Wabamun Lake Provincial Park	Interchange; former Highway 30 south
Parkland County	Manly Corner	338.4	210.3		Highway 770 south – Carvel, Warburg	
Parkland County	Manly Corner	338.8	210.5	340	Highway 43 north – Whitecourt, Grande Prairie, Peace River	Interchange; access to Alaska Highway and Mackenzie Highway; west end of CANAMEX Corridor (follows Highway 43 north)
Parkland County		343.0	213.1	344	Highway 16A east (Parkland Highway) – Stony Plain, Spruce Grove, Edmonton City Centre	Eastbound exit and westbound entrance
Parkland County		353.5	219.7	355	Highway 779 – Stony Plain, Calahoo	Interchange; Fifth Meridian, 114° Longitude
Parkland County	Spruce Grove	357.9	222.4	360	Campsite Road	Interchange; known as Jennifer Heil Way inside Spruce Grove city limits
Parkland County	Spruce Grove	359.4	223.3		Calahoo Road (Highway 788)	Intersection closed; former alignement
Parkland County	Spruce Grove	361.1	224.4	363	Century Road	Interchange
Parkland County		366.1	227.5	368	Highway 44 north – Villeneuve, Westlock	Interchange
Parkland County	Acheson	369.1	229.3	371	Highway 60 south (Devonian Way) – Devon	Interchange; truck bypass to Highway 2 south
City of Edmonton		374.0	232.4	376	Winterburn Road (215 Street)	Interchange
City of Edmonton		375.9	233.6	378	Anthony Henday Drive (Highway 216) – Cold Lake, Fort McMurray, Calgary	Interchange; Highway 216 exit 25; east end of CANAMEX Corridor (follows Highway 216 south)
City of Edmonton		377.4	234.5	379	184 Street – St. Albert	Interchange
City of Edmonton		379.0	235.5	381	170 Street – St. Albert, West Edmonton Mall	Interchange
City of Edmonton		380.8	236.6	383	156 Street – St. Albert	Interchange
City of Edmonton		383.0	238.0	385	St. Albert Trail (Highway 2 north) – St. Albert, Athabasca	Interchange
City of Edmonton		384.0	238.6	386	127 Street	Interchange under construction
City of Edmonton		387.3	240.7	389	97 Street (Highway 28 north) – Cold Lake, Fort McMurray	Interchange
City of Edmonton		388.9	241.7	391	82 Street – Northlands	Interchange
City of Edmonton		390.0	242.3	392	Fort Road / Wayne Gretzky Drive – Northlands	Interchange
City of Edmonton		392.5	243.9	394	50 Street (Highway 15 north) – Fort Saskatchewan, Fort McMurray	Interchange
City of Edmonton		395.0	245.4	397	118 Avenue / Victoria Trail	Interchange
City of Edmonton		395.8	245.9	Crosses North Saskatchewan River; Beverly Bridge (eastbound) and Clover Bar Bridge (westbound)		
City of Edmonton		396.4	246.3	400	Hayter Road / 17 Street NW	Interchange; signed as exit 400A
Strathcona County–Edmonton boundary	Sherwood Park	396.4– 399.4	246.3– 248.2	400	Anthony Henday Drive (Highway 216) – Cold Lake, Fort McMurray, Calgary	Interchange; Highway 216 exit 54; eastbound signed as exit 400A; westbound signed as exit 400B (north) and 400C (south)
Strathcona County–Edmonton boundary	Sherwood Park	399.4	248.2	400	Broadmoor Boulevard / 17 Street NE	Interchange; eastbound signed as exit 400B; westbound signed as exit 400C
Strathcona County–Edmonton boundary	Sherwood Park	401.0	249.2	403	Sherwood Drive / Range Road 232	Interchange
Strathcona County	Sherwood Park	402.6	250.2	405	Clover Bar Road / Range Road 231	Interchange
Strathcona County	Bremner	404.2	251.2	406	Highway 21 – Camrose, Fort Saskatchewan	Interchange; eastbound signed as exits 406A (south) and 406B (north)
Strathcona County	Ardrossan	410.7	255.2	413	Highway 824 south	Interchange
Strathcona County		415.6	258.2		Highway 830 – Josephburg	
I.D. No. 13 (Elk Island National Park)		423.7	263.3		West end of Elk Island National Park	
I.D. No. 13 (Elk Island National Park)		431.1	267.9		Elk Island Parkway	To Highway 831 north
I.D. No. 13 (Elk Island National Park)		433.6	269.4		East end of Elk Island National Park	
Lamont County		443.4	275.5		Highway 834 – Chipman, Tofield	
Lamont County	Mundare	464.5	288.6		Highway 15 west – Chipman, Lamont, Fort Saskatchewan; Highway 855 – Andrew, Holden, Ryley	
County of Minburn No. 27		475.3	295.3		Highway 631 east	
County of Minburn No. 27	Vegreville	479.2	297.8	481	Highway 16A east (50 Avenue) – Vegreville	Eastbound exit and westbound entrance
County of Minburn No. 27	Vegreville	488.1	303.3		Highway 857 – Bruce, Willingdon	
County of Minburn No. 27	Vegreville	490.0	304.5	492	Highway 16A west (50 Avenue) – Vegreville	Westbound exit and eastbound entrance
County of Minburn No. 27	Lavoy	500.6	311.1			
County of Minburn No. 27		506.2	314.5		Highway 36 (Veterans Memorial Highway) – Viking, Two Hills	Interchange proposed (no construction timeline)
County of Minburn No. 27	Ranfurly	515.2	320.1		UAR 199 north (Range Road 122A)	
County of Minburn No. 27		526.3	327.0		Highway 870 – Innisfree, Morecambe, Kinsella	
County of Minburn No. 27		539.6	335.3		UAR 216 north (Range Road 102) – Minburn	
County of Minburn No. 27	Mannville	553.1	343.7		Highway 881 – Irma, Myrnam, St. Paul	
County of Vermilion River	Vermilion	574.4	356.9	577	Highway 41 (Buffalo Trail) – Elk Point, Cold Lake, Wainwright	Interchange
County of Vermilion River		595.0	369.7		Highway 893 – Islay, Dewberry	
County of Vermilion River	Kitscoty	610.7	379.5		Highway 897 – Marwayne, Paradise Valley	
County of Vermilion River	Blackfoot	622.0	386.5			
City of Lloydminster		631.6	392.5		62 Avenue	Bypass route to Highway 17
City of Lloydminster		633.5	393.6		50 Avenue (Highway 17) – Onion Lake, Macklin	
City of Lloydminster		633.5	393.6		Highway 16 (TCH/YH) east – The Battlefords, Saskatoon	Continuation into Saskatchewan
1.000 mi = 1.609 km; 1.000 km = 0.621 mi: Closed/former; Concurrency terminus; Incomplete access; Unopened

== Footnotes ==
Yellowhead Highway
Previous route BC Highway 16	Highway 16	Next route SK Highway 16
Trans-Canada Highway
Previous route BC Highway 16	Highway 16	Next route SK Highway 16
