= Wabamun =

Wabamun may refer to:

- Wabamun, Alberta, a hamlet in Alberta, Canada
- Wabamun Lake, a lake in Alberta, Canada
- Wabamun Indian Reserve No. 133A, on the east shore of Wabamun Lake
- Wabamun Indian Reserve No. 133B, on the east shore of Wabamun Lake
- Wabamun Lake Provincial Park, on the north-eastern shore of Wabamun Lake
- Wabamun Formation, a stratigraphical unit of Famennian age in the Western Canadian Sedimentary Basin
- Wabamun Generating Station, a coal-fired plant that was located next to the village of Wabamun
- Kapasiwin, Alberta, formerly known as Wabamun Beach
