= Alberta Highway 30 =

Highway in Alberta, Canada

- Kapasiwin Road

Route information
- Length: 4 km (2.5 mi)
- Existed: 1950s–1990s

Major junctions
- South end: Kapasiwin
- North end: Highway 16 (TCH) near Kapasiwin

Location
- Country: Canada
- Province: Alberta
- Specialized and rural municipalities: Parkland

Highway system
- Alberta Numbered Highway Network; List; Former
← Highway 29	→ Highway 31

Highway 30 was a 4-kilometre (2.5 mi) long north–south highway in central Alberta, Canada that existed between the 1950s and mid-1980s, connecting the Yellowhead Highway (Highway 16) with the Summer Village of Kapasiwin.

Highway 30 passed through Wabamun Lake Provincial Park and was transferred to Parkland County in the mid-1990s; now referred to as Kapasiwin Road.
