= Alberta Highway 16X =

Designation of several highways in Alberta

Route information
- Length: 36 km (22 mi)
- Existed: 1970s–1997

Major junctions
- West end: Highway 16 (TCH) west of Stony Plain
- Highway 60 near Acheson
- East end: Highway 2 / Highway 16 (TCH) (170 Street) in Edmonton

Location
- Country: Canada
- Province: Alberta
- Specialized and rural municipalities: Parkland County
- Major cities: Edmonton, Spruce Grove

Highway system
- Alberta Numbered Highway Network; List; Former
← Highway 16A	→ Highway 17

Alberta Provincial Highway No. 16X, commonly referred to as Highway 16X, is the designation of one former and three proposed routes off Highway 16 (Yellowhead Highway) in Alberta, Canada. The former section was a 36 km (22 mi) east–west provincial highway in Edmonton Capital Region, that existed for approximately 20 years between the 1970s and 1997 and is now part of Highway 16. Right of way is set aside around Hinton, Edson, and Lloydminster that is presently designated as Highway 16X.

== History ==
In the 1970s, Highway 16 was a four-lane, divided highway that passed along the northern edge of Stony Plain, through Spruce Grove, and passed through Edmonton along Stony Plain Road, Mayfield Road, 111 Avenue, and 118 Avenue. The need for a free-flow bypass was identified, however interchanges within Spruce Grove were deemed impractical. A bypass was built 3.2 km (2.0 mi) north of the existing highway. Construction began of a two-lane highway west out of Edmonton along 118 Avenue, with sections opening throughout the early 1980s until it reached Highway 16, approximately 4 km (2 mi) east of Highway 43. Highway 16 was redesignated to follow Stony Plain Road, 170 Street, and Yellowhead Trail through Edmonton. By 1988, Highway 16X was twinned and transitioned to being the preferred western entrance into Edmonton, while the Stony Plain Road section of Highway 16 was more focused on commuter traffic. In 1990, in conjunction with Highway 16 assuming the Trans-Canada Highway route shield, Highway 16X also assumed the shield, an exception to the general practice in Alberta where suffixed routes are signed only with a standard Alberta highway shield. For consistency, the main business and commuter route was renumbered to Highway 16A in 1997 and renamed as the Parkland Highway while the main tourist route became Highway 16.

== Future ==
Highway 16X is the designation of three proposed bypasses around Hinton, Edson, and Lloydminster. The province of Alberta has determined alignments for all three bypasses, coincidentally all would be on the south side of the present Highway 16 alignments. The Hinton bypass, temporarily designated as 16X:02, would run between Highway 40 south and Drinnan Way, bypassing a 10 km (6 mi) section of Highway 16. The bypass of Edson, designated as 16X:06, would run between 75 Street and the Edson Golf Course, bypassing 6 kilometres (4 mi) of Highway 16. The Lloydminster bypass, designated as 16X:30, the only one presently being studied by Alberta Transportation, would start near the hamlet of Blackfoot and intersect Highway 17 at the Alberta-Saskatchewan border, approximately 4.8 km (3.0 mi) south of the present Highway 16/17 intersection. East of Highway 17, the bypass would be under Saskatchewan provincial jurisdiction. As of 2017, a planning study for the bypass had not been published by Saskatchewan. Funding for the Alberta portion was not included in the 2016-2019 construction plan.

== Major intersections ==
All exits are unnumbered.

Rural/specialized municipality	Location	km	mi	Destinations	Notes
Parkland County		0.0	0.0	Highway 16 (TCH) west to Highway 43 north – Jasper, Grande Prairie, Peace River	Continuation west
Parkland County		0.0	0.0	Highway 16 (TCH) east – Stony Plain, Spruce Grove, Edmonton City Centre	Eastbound exit, westbound entrance
Parkland County		10.5	6.5	Highway 779 – Stony Plain, Calahoo	At-grade; interchange constructed after renumbering
Parkland County	Spruce Grove	16.4	10.2	Highway 788 (Calahoo Road)	At-grade; intersection closed after renumbering
Parkland County	Spruce Grove	18.1	11.2	Century Road / Range Road 272	Interchange
Parkland County		23.1	14.4	Highway 794 north / Township Road 531A – Villeneuve, Westlock	Interchange; present-day Hwy 44
Parkland County	Acheson	26.1	16.2	Highway 60 south (Devonian Way) / Range Road 263 – Devon	Interchange
City of Edmonton		31.0	19.3	Winterburn Road (215 Street)	At-grade; interchange constructed after renumbering
City of Edmonton		32.9	20.4	Anthony Henday Drive (Highway 216)	Extension constructed after renumbering
City of Edmonton		34.4	21.4	184 Street	At-grade; interchange constructed after renumbering
City of Edmonton		36.0	22.4	170 Street ( Highway 2 south / Highway 16 (TCH) west) – Red Deer, Calgary, Jasper	Interchange
City of Edmonton		36.0	22.4	Yellowhead Trail ( Highway 2 north / Highway 16 (TCH) east) – St. Albert, Peace River, Lloydminster	Continuation east
1.000 mi = 1.609 km; 1.000 km = 0.621 mi: Closed/former; Incomplete access; Route transition; Unopened
