= Alberta Highway 31 =

Highway in Alberta, Canada

Highway 31 Highway 759

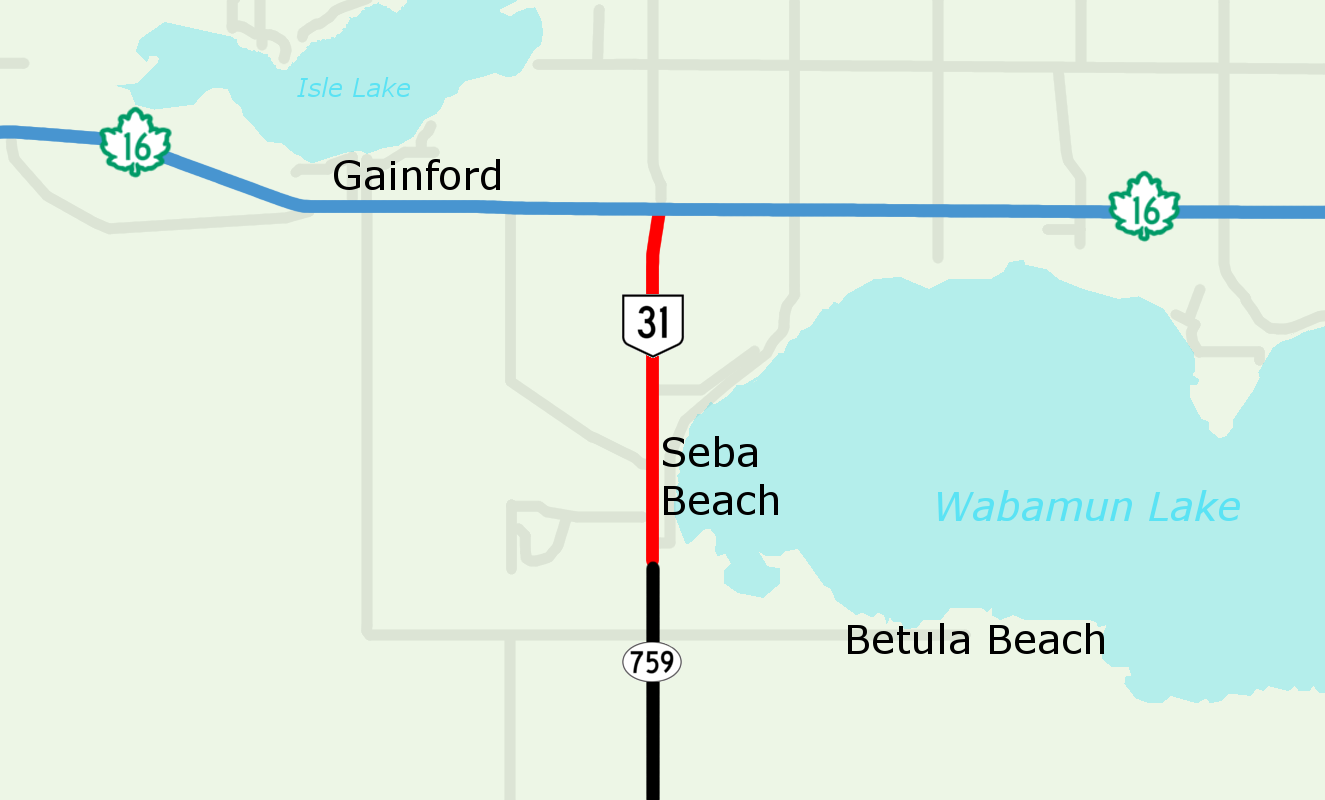

Route information
- Maintained by the Ministry of Transportation and Economic Corridors

Highway 31
- Length: 3.93 km (2.44 mi)
- South end: Highway 16 (TCH) near Gainford
- North end: Highway 759 at Seba Beach

Highway 759
- Length: 39.36 km (24.46 mi)
- South end: Highway 39 near Drayton Valley
- North end: Highway 31 at Seba Beach

Location
- Country: Canada
- Province: Alberta
- Specialized and rural municipalities: Brazeau County, Parkland County

Highway system
- Alberta Provincial Highway Network; List; Former
| ← Highway 29 | → Highway 32 |
| ← Highway 758 | → Highway 760 |

Alberta Provincial Highway No. 31, commonly referred to as Highway 31, is a short north–south highway in central Alberta, Canada. Highway 31 begins at Highway 16, 3.3 km (2.1 mi) east of Gainford, and ends 3.9 km (2.4 mi) to the south in Seba Beach, where it continues south as Highway 759.

Highway 759 is 39 km (24 mi) highway that begins at Highway 39, 16 km (10 mi) east of Drayton Valley, and continues north through Tomahawk to Seba Beach.

At the Highway 16 interchange, the route is signed as Highway 759 even though it is officially the northern terminus of Highway 31.

== Major intersections ==
| Rural/specialized municipality | Location | km | mi | Destinations | Notes |
|---|---|---|---|---|---|
| Brazeau County | | 0.0 | 0.0 | Highway 39 to Highway 22 – Drayton Valley, Leduc | Highway 759 southern terminus |
| ↑ / ↓ | | 12.4 | 7.7 | Crosses the North Saskatchewan River | |
| Parkland County | | 18.3 | 11.4 | Highway 621 west – Northleigh | |
| Parkland County | Tomahawk | 21.5 | 13.4 | | |
| Parkland County | | 28.6 | 17.8 | Highway 627 east – Highvale, Stony Plain | |
| Parkland County | Seba Beach | 39.4 0.0 | 24.5 0.0 | Highway 759 northern terminus / Highway 31 southern terminus | |
| Parkland County | | 3.9 | 2.4 | Highway 16 (TCH/YH) – Jasper, Edmonton | Interchange, Highway 16 exit 306; Highway 31 northern terminus |
1.000 mi = 1.609 km; 1.000 km = 0.621 mi: Route transition
