= Minburn =

Minburn may refer to:

- County of Minburn No. 27, a municipal district in Alberta, Canada
- Minburn, Alberta, a hamlet in Canada
- Minburn, Iowa, a city in the United States
