= Gemeinde =

Gemeinde (German: [ɡəˈmaɪndə]; plural: Gemeinden) is a German word translating to "community", "town", "parish", or "municipality".

Gemeinde may refer to:

- An administrative division encompassing a single village, town, or city:
  - Gemeinde (Austria)
  - Gemeinde (Germany)
  - Gemeinde (South Tyrol)
  - Gemeinde (Switzerland)
- Gemeinde (theology), a Christian or Jewish congregation

== See also ==
- Gemeente, in the Netherlands
- Gmina, in Poland
