= Royal Park, Alberta =

Royal Park, Alberta may refer to:

- Royal Park, Minburn County No. 27, Alberta, a locality in Minburn County No. 27, Alberta
- Royal Park, Parkland County, Alberta, a locality in Parkland County, Alberta
