= Ranfurly =

Ranfurly may refer to the following places:

- Ranfurly, Alberta, Canada
- Ranfurly, Renfrewshire, Renfrewshire, Scotland
- Ranfurly, New Zealand, Otago, New Zealand

Ranfurly may also refer to:

- Ranfurly Shield, one of New Zealand's most important trophies in the sport of Rugby Union
- Uchter Knox, 5th Earl of Ranfurly, a Governor-General of New Zealand
