= Obed Summit =

- Location within Alberta
- Elevation: 1,163.9 m (3,819 ft)
- Traversed by: Highway 16 (Yellowhead Highway)

Location
- Location: Obed, Alberta, Canada
- Range: Rocky Mountain Foothills
- Coordinates: 53°30′20.5″N 117°18′57.5″W
- Topo map: NTS 83F11 Dalehurst

Obed Summit is the highest point on the Yellowhead Highway. At an elevation of 1,163.9 m (3,819 ft), it is notable for being 33 m (108 ft) higher than Yellowhead Pass on the Continental Divide within the Canadian Rockies. Obed Summit is located on Alberta Highway 16 near the hamlet of Obed, between Hinton and Edson.
