= Point Alison =

- Summer village
- Summer Village of Point Alison
- Location of Point Alison in Alberta
- Coordinates: 53.55007°N 114.48449°W
- Country: Canada
- Province: Alberta
- Region: Edmonton Metropolitan Region
- Census division: No. 11

Government
  - Type: Municipal incorporation
  - Mayor: C. Gordon Wilson
  - Governing body: Point Alison Summer Village Council

Area (2021)
  - Land: 0.19 km^{2} (0.073 sq mi)

Population (2021)
  - Total: 18
  - Density: 93.7/km^{2} (243/sq mi)
- Time zone: UTC−06:00 (Alberta Time)
- Website: Official website

Point Alison is a summer village in Alberta, Canada, on the northern shore of Wabamun Lake and south of the Hamlet of Wabamun. The first registered owner of the property was in 1904. The property was not named Point Alison until 1932 when George Archibald, who was the sole owner of the land, subdivided the area and named it after his wife Alison. The property was incorporated in December 1950. Prospect Drive is the only access road in the summer village.

== Demographics ==
In the 2021 Census of Population conducted by Statistics Canada, the Summer Village of Point Alison had a population of 18 living in 10 of its 31 total private dwellings, a change of 80% from its 2016 population of 10. With a land area of 0.19 km^{2} (0.073 sq mi), it had a population density of 94.7/km^{2} (245.4/sq mi) in 2021.

In the 2016 Census of Population conducted by Statistics Canada, the Summer Village of Point Alison had a population of 10 living in 6 of its 31 total private dwellings, a −33.3% change from its 2011 population of 15. With a land area of 0.16 km^{2} (0.062 sq mi), it had a population density of 62.5/km^{2} (161.9/sq mi) in 2016.

The Summer Village of Point Alison's 2013 municipal census counted a population of 10, a 66.7% change from its 2010 municipal census population of 6.

== See also ==
- List of communities in Alberta
- List of summer villages in Alberta
- List of resort villages in Saskatchewan
