= Brush Hill, Alberta =

Coordinates: 53.5708°N 111.9600°W

Bush Hill
- Former locality
- Location of the former community of Bush Hill Bush Hill (Alberta)
- Country: Canada
- Province: Alberta
- Region: Central Alberta
- Census division: 10
- Municipal district: County of Minburn No. 27
- Settled: 1900

Government
  - Type: Unincorporated

Population
  - Total: 0
- Time zone: UTC−06:00 (Alberta Time)

Brush Hill was an unincorporated community in the County of Minburn No. 27, Alberta, Canada, that was situated approximately 13 kilometres (8.1 mi) northeast of Vegreville.

== Toponymy ==
Brush Hill derived its name from a school that opened there in 1904. The school itself was named after a nearby hill, which served as a landmark for travellers passing through the district.

== History ==
=== Founding and early growth: 1904–1949 ===
Settlement in the area began around 1900. Early residents were of primarily Russian German and Volga German origin.

Brush Hill's church building and congregation, pictured in 1916.

On May 10, 1904, locals established the Brush Hill School District No. 1032. Residents formed a Reformed Church congregation the following year, using the school as a place of worship. A permanent church opened in 1916, officially named the Brush Hill Reformed Church; it was also known as the Zion Church or Zions Gemeinde Church of Brush Hill. The building also hosted a Sunday school.

Beginning in 1917, some veterans of the First World War received land in the Brush Hill District through the Soldier Settlement Board. In the 1920s, local men formed a Brush Hill baseball team to compete against counterparts from nearby communities. By 1928, enrolment at Brush Hill School had outgrown the original building, and a new brick facility was installed.

On June 26, 1934, Brush Hill's church officially became the Evangelical and Reformed Church. The Brush Hill Mutual Telephone Company also formed to bring telephone services to the community. A local Ladies' Aid Society was established the next year, which became responsible for arranging annual picnics in Brush Hill.

=== Decline and remaining 20th century: 1950–2000 ===
Brush Hill's baseball team disbanded in 1951, and Brush Hill School closed in 1952. At this time, the school had just 17 students, who were subsequently transported by bus to Vegreville for classes. Two years later, the Brush Hill Community Society purchased the building and converted it into a community hall.

In August 1956, the Brush Hill Evangelical and Reformed Church celebrated its semicentennial. The church would close permanently soon after, on July 29, 1958, and the Brush Hill Ladies' Aid Society ceased operations in 1959.

The Brush Hill Mutual Telephone Company dissolved in November 1971. In July 1979, a reunion of congregants was hosted inside the church, alongside a reunion of former students of Brush Hill School. Attendees discovered that the church's organ and stove had been stolen in the intervening years, along with items of furniture.

The Brush Hill Community Centre remained in use until at least 1980. It fell dormant by 1988, when it was briefly reopened for use as a film set by the National Film Board of Canada. The building featured in a docudrama about the experiences of rural Albertan farmers during the Second World War.

A historical cairn was installed outside the church in July 1955, bearing a dedication to the "Pioneers who built [it] in 1916".

=== 21st century ===
Brush Hill's name remains in use as a shorthand for the geographic area, primarily to identify its defunct church and cemetery.

== Places of interest ==
As of 2026, the former site of Brush Hill is occupied by the abandoned Brush Hill School and Brush Hill Evangelical and Reformed Church, alongside the church's cemetery. The buildings serve as places of historic interest.

== See also ==
- List of communities in Alberta
