= Highvale =

Highvale may refer to:

- Highvale, Queensland, a locality in Australia
- Highvale, Alberta, a locality in Canada
