= Devon Bridge =

Devon Bridge may refer to:

Bridges in Canada:

- Devon Bridge (Alberta)

Bridges in the United States:

- Washington Bridge (Connecticut), also known as the "Devon Bridge", brings US Route 1 over the Housatonic River at Devon neighborhood of Milford, Connecticut
- Housatonic River Railroad Bridge, also known as the "Devon Bridge", adjacent railroad bridge over the Housatonic River
