= Minburn, Alberta =

Minburn
- Hamlet
- Hamlet of Minburn
- Location within Alberta
- Coordinates: 53°18′59″N 111°22′6″W
- Country: Canada
- Province: Alberta
- Region: Central Alberta
- Census Division: No. 10
- Municipal district: County of Minburn No. 27
- Village: June 24, 1919
- Dissolution (hamlet): July 1, 2015

Area (2021)
  - Land: 0.57 km^{2} (0.22 sq mi)
- Elevation: 635 m (2,083 ft)

Population (2021)
  - Total: 78
  - Density: 136.1/km^{2} (352/sq mi)
- Time zone: UTC−06:00 (Alberta Time)
- Highways: 16

Minburn is a hamlet in central, Alberta, Canada within the County of Minburn No. 27. It is located on the Yellowhead Highway and the Canadian National Railway, approximately 37 km (23 mi) west of the Town of Vermilion and 143 km (89 mi) east of the City of Edmonton.

== History ==
Minburn was incorporated as a village on June 24, 1919. It dissolved from village status on July 1, 2015, to become a hamlet under the jurisdiction of the County of Minburn No. 27.

== Demographics ==
In the 2021 Census of Population conducted by Statistics Canada, Minburn had a population of 78 living in 37 of its 42 total private dwellings, a change of −32.2% from its 2016 population of 115. With a land area of 0.57 km^{2} (0.22 sq mi), it had a population density of 136.8/km^{2} (354.4/sq mi) in 2021.

As a designated place in the 2016 Census of Population conducted by Statistics Canada, Minburn had a population of 115 living in 49 of its 49 total private dwellings, a 9.5% change from its 2011 population of 105. With a land area of 0.73 km^{2} (0.28 sq mi), it had a population density of 157.5/km^{2} (408.0/sq mi) in 2016.

== See also ==
- List of communities in Alberta
- List of former urban municipalities in Alberta
- List of hamlets in Alberta
