= Lavoy =

Hamlet in Alberta, Canada

- Hamlet
- Location of Lavoy Lavoy (Canada)
- Coordinates: 53°27′24″N 111°51′55″W
- Country: Canada
- Province: Alberta
- Region: Central Alberta
- Census division: 10
- Municipal district: County of Minburn No. 27

Government
  - Type: Unincorporated
  - Governing body: County of Minburn No. 27 Council

Population (2001)
  - Total: 108
- Time zone: UTC−06:00 (Alberta Time)
- Area codes: 780, 587, 825

Lavoy is a hamlet in central Alberta, Canada, within the County of Minburn No. 27. It is located on Highway 16, approximately 108 kilometres (67 mi) east of Edmonton.

== Demographics ==
Lavoy recorded a population of 108 in the 2001 Census of Population conducted by Statistics Canada.

== See also ==
- List of communities in Alberta
- List of former urban municipalities in Alberta
- List of hamlets in Alberta
