= Prairie Lodge Trailer Court, Alberta =

Unincorporated community in Alberta, Canada

Prairie Lodge Trailer Court
- Designated place
- Location of Prairie Lodge Trailer Court Prairie Lodge Trailer Court (Canada)
- Coordinates: 53.514°N 112.053°W
- Country: Canada
- Province: Alberta
- Region: Central Alberta
- Census division: 10
- Municipal district: County of Minburn No. 27

Government
  - Type: Unincorporated
  - Governing body: County of Minburn No. 27 Council

Area (2021)
  - Land: 0.28 km^{2} (0.11 sq mi)

Population (2021)
  - Total: 5
  - Density: 17.9/km^{2} (46/sq mi)
- Time zone: UTC−06:00 (Alberta Time)
- Area codes: 780, 587, 825

Prairie Lodge Trailer Court is an unincorporated community in Alberta, Canada within the County of Minburn No. 27 that is recognized as a designated place by Statistics Canada. It is located on the north side of Township Road 524, 0.9 km (0.56 mi) east of Highway 857. It is adjacent to the Town of Vegreville to the south.

== Demographics ==
In the 2021 Census of Population conducted by Statistics Canada, Prairie Lodge Trailer Court had a population of 5 living in 4 of its 11 total private dwellings, a change of −87.5% from its 2016 population of 40. With a land area of 0.28 km^{2} (0.11 sq mi), it had a population density of 17.9/km^{2} (46.2/sq mi) in 2021.

As a designated place in the 2016 Census of Population conducted by Statistics Canada, Prairie Lodge Trailer Court had a population of 40 living in 16 of its 21 total private dwellings, a change of 8.1% from its 2011 population of 37. With a land area of 0.28 km^{2} (0.11 sq mi), it had a population density of 142.9/km^{2} (370.0/sq mi) in 2016.

== See also ==
- List of communities in Alberta
- List of designated places in Alberta
