= Gainford, Alberta =

Gainford
- Hamlet
- Location of Gainford in Alberta
- Coordinates: 53.5869°N 114.7881°W
- Country: Canada
- Province: Alberta
- Census division: No. 11
- Municipal district: Parkland County
- Post office: 1910
- Founded by: Grand Trunk Pacific Railway c. 1909
- Named after: Gainford, County Durham, England

Government
  - Type: Unincorporated
  - Mayor: Allan Gamble
  - Governing body: Parkland County Council: Natalie Birnie; Allan William Hoefsloot; Phyllis Kobasiuk; Kristina Kowalski; Sally Kucher Johnson; Rob Wiedeman

Area (2021)
  - Land: 1.36 km^{2} (0.53 sq mi)
- Elevation: 740 m (2,430 ft)

Population (2021)
  - Total: 118
  - Density: 86.7/km^{2} (225/sq mi)
- Time zone: UTC−06:00 (Alberta Time)
- Postal Code: T0E 0W0
- Area code: 780

Gainford is a hamlet in Alberta, Canada within Parkland County. It is located approximately 86 kilometres (53 mi) west of Edmonton and has an elevation of 740 metres (2,430 ft).

The hamlet is located in Census Division No. 11 and in the federal riding of Yellowhead. The north border of Gainford shares part of the shore of Isle Lake (also known as Lake Isle). The Yellowhead Highway (Alberta Highway 16) passes through Gainford.

== History ==
The first post office opened in 1910. The community takes its name from Gainford, County Durham, England.

== Demographics ==
In the 2021 Census of Population conducted by Statistics Canada, Gainford had a population of 118 living in 49 of its 67 total private dwellings, a change of 19.2% from its 2016 population of 99. With a land area of 1.36 km^{2} (0.53 sq mi), it had a population density of 86.8/km^{2} (224.7/sq mi) in 2021.

As a designated place in the 2016 Census of Population conducted by Statistics Canada, Gainford had a population of 79 living in 38 of its 53 total private dwellings, a change of −40.2% from its 2011 population of 132. With a land area of 1.08 km^{2} (0.42 sq mi), it had a population density of 73.1/km^{2} (189.5/sq mi) in 2016.

== See also ==
- List of communities in Alberta
- List of designated places in Alberta
- List of hamlets in Alberta
