= Wabamun Lake =

Lake in Alberta, Canada

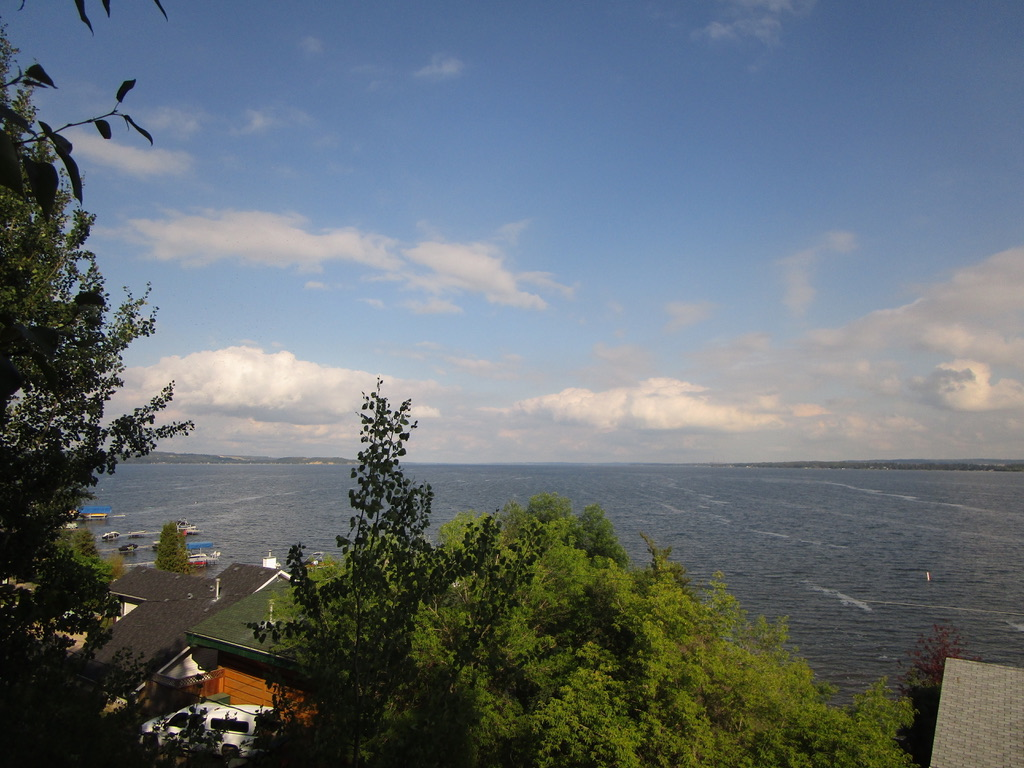
- Wabamun Lake, as seen from Seba Beach

- Location within Alberta
- Location: Parkland County, Alberta
- Coordinates: 53°31′47″N 114°35′14″W
- Catchment area: 259 square kilometres (100 sq mi)
- Basin countries: Canada
- Max. length: 19.2 km (11.9 mi)
- Max. width: 6.6 km (4.1 mi)
- Surface area: 82 square kilometres (32 sq mi)
- Max. depth: ≈11 metres (36 ft)
- Water volume: 0.513 km^{3} (0.123 cu mi)
- Shore length^{1}: 57.3 kilometres (35.6 mi)
- Surface elevation: 724.55 metres (2,377.1 ft)
- Settlements: Wabamun, Seba Beach, Fallis
- ^{1} Shore length is not a well-defined measure.

Wabamun Lake (sometimes spelled Wabumun) is one of the most heavily used lakes in Alberta, Canada. It lies 65 kilometres (40 mi) west of Edmonton. It is 19.2 kilometres (11.9 mi) long and 6.6 kilometres (4.1 mi) wide, covers 82 square kilometres (32 sq mi) and is 11 metres (36 ft) at its deepest, with somewhat clear water.

Its name derives from the Cree word for mirror, ᐋᐧᐸᒧᐣ (wâpamon) a reference to the water of the lake. The name for the lake in the Stoney language is Wihnemne.

Wabamun was reputedly the best whitefish lake in the Edmonton area and is well known for its large northern pike, both of which were fished commercially during the early 20th century. A large variety of migrating, breeding and moulting wildfowl visit the lake. Beaver and muskrat use the lake while the surrounding upland supports coyotes, porcupine, moose and white-tailed deer. There are also reported sightings of cougars, wolves and bears. Alberta Fish and Wildlife has confirmed that there have been wolf kills of cattle and sheep near Isle Lake (northwest of Wabamun Lake). There are natural beaches along much of the shoreline, but emergent vegetation restricts their use. The most popular beaches for swimming are the artificially made one at the provincial park in Moonlight Bay, and the natural one at Seba Beach. There are numerous recreational cottages along its shores. Several communities line the north shore of the lake, the largest being Wabamun. Rich coal deposits surrounding the lake have been mined by TransAlta for power plants it operates and that are cooled by lake water.

== Communities ==
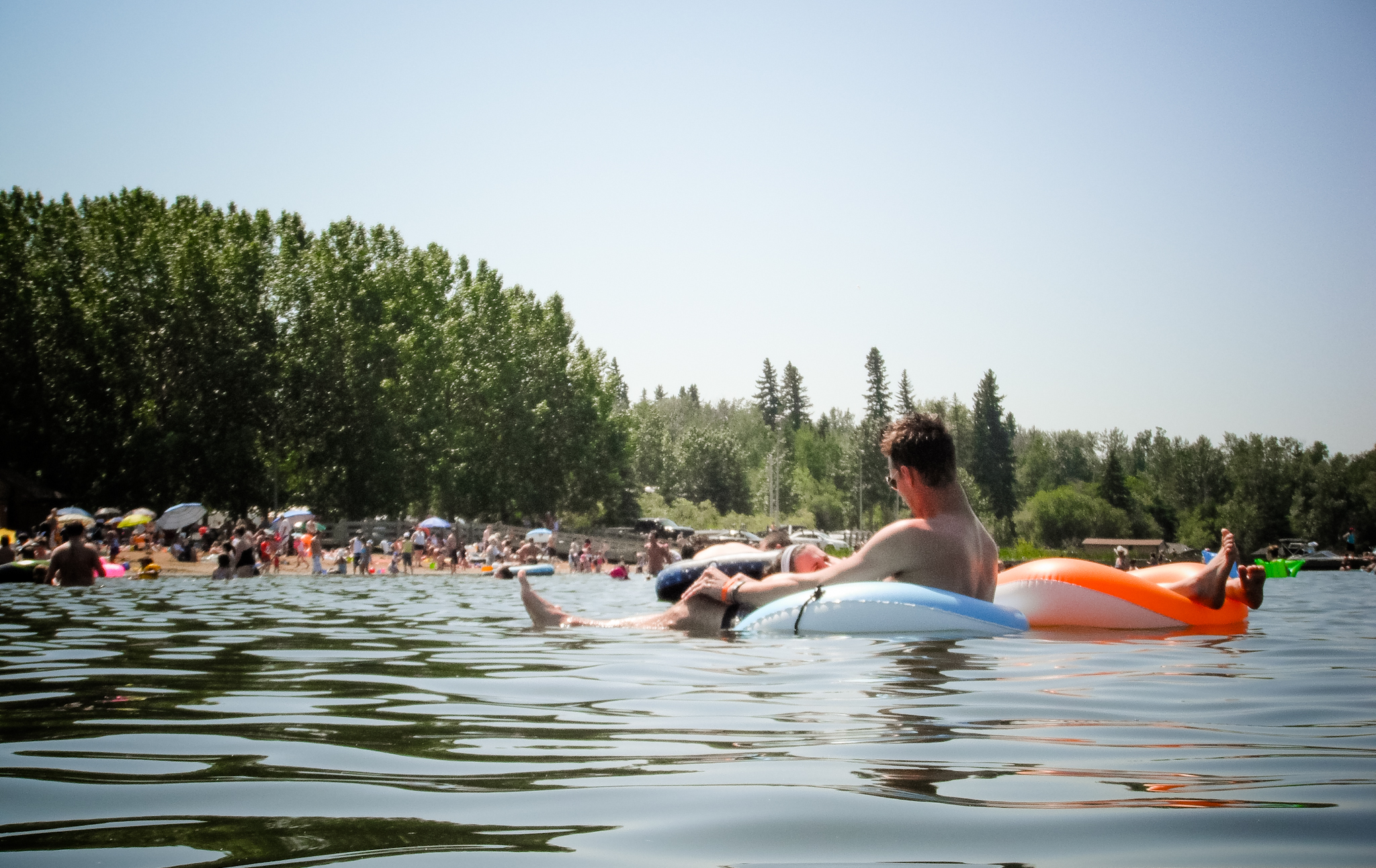
Beachgoers at Wabamun Beach

The Summer Village of Lakeview, the Hamlet of Wabamun, the Summer Village of Point Alison, and the Hamlet of Fallis are on Wabamun Lake's north shore. The Summer Village of Seba Beach is on the western shore of the lake, while the Summer Village of Betula Beach is on the southern shore. Much of the other land on the southern shore is owned by TransAlta Utilities and used to mine coal for power generation. The Wabamun No. 133A Indian reserve, home of the Paul First Nation, and the Summer Village of Kapasiwin are on the eastern shore of Wabamun Lake.

== History ==
During early surveys of the area, Wabamun Lake was named "White Whale Lake", a reference to the large whitefish in the lake. Development of the Grand Trunk Pacific Railway greatly stimulated the local economy. Commercial fisheries used the railway to carry fish by box car to as far away as New York City. Seba Beach, a community at the lake's western edge, had a whitefish cannery, but this eventually shut down; the vacant building remains in the village. The railway urged summer tourists to visit from Edmonton. In winter, ice was cut to supply railway refrigeration cars. Coal was transported to a power generating plant in Edmonton, then later used for several power plants on the Wabamun Lake shore.

=== Ecological damage ===
Intensive exploitation of lake resources and habitat destruction resulted in marked decrease in fish production so that commercial operations were halted, and recreational fishing is presently limited to catch and release. (Limited to five whitefish as of 2023) Years of construction activity on the lake's limited watershed resulted in lowered water levels. Heavy metals (aluminium, chromium, arsenic, and copper) dissolved in the water as a result of coal burning were deemed to be at acceptable levels, but metals in sediment and mercury in larger pike were found to be excessive. TransAlta responded with measures to reduce metal and thermal pollution, and the Wabamun power plant was decommissioned and demolished. As a result of the Canadian National Railway oil spill, fish from the lake are not recommended for consumption. The native population of walleye have not been seen in the lake since the early 1900s when they were fished out. Several attempts to restock walleye in the lake failed because the Wabamun power plant (built in the 1950s) discharged its heated cooling water into the lake, keeping that portion of the lake clear of ice. Walleye would spawn in the warm water weeks prior to their normal spawning time and the hatchlings did not survive when they could not find enough food in the still-cold portions of the lake. After closure of the Wabamun power plant in 2010, Alberta Fish and Wildlife attempted another stocking of walleye, which has proven to be successful. Walleye are reproducing and so are their young. TransAlta no longer uses the lake for any of its operations. Change in temperature from the power plants on the lake increased dissolved oxygen, lowering the water quality and causing algae blooms to become a common occurrence. Heavy development of natural shoreline has decreased the numbers of waterfowl that once bred on the lake: western grebes and American coots both once nested on the lake in some of the largest numbers in the province, and now are seen only during migration. The populations of birds that rely on the shore have also decreased such as great blue heron and spotted sandpiper. Overfishing during the 1920s greatly decreased native lake whitefish populations, and the stocking of pike only furthered this. The recent introduction of walleye has seen a decrease in the population of pike, as well as in other native fish such as spottail shiner and yellow perch.

=== Oil spill ===
At 5:40 a.m. on August 3, 2005, 43 cars of a Canadian National (CN) freight train derailed near the Whitewood Sands subdivision, spilling up to 1.3 million litres (290,000 imp gal; 340,000 US gal) of heavy bunker C fuel oil. An estimated 734,000 litres (161,000 imp gal; 194,000 US gal) of the thick, dark material was spread by high winds across 8 kilometres (5.0 mi) of the surface of Wabamun Lake.

Volunteers soon began placing booms and absorbent material to protect the shoreline, and brought 230 oil-slicked birds and other wildlife to the Wabamun area for rescue.

One hundred Wabamun Lake residents took part in a five-hour blockade of the CN tracks in protest against what they felt was insufficient action by the railway in cleaning up the spill. The province of Alberta then issued an environmental protection order to ensure that the cleanup proceed.

Four days after the derailment CN said that a "hazardous chemical" had spilled into the lake in addition to the bunker C fuel oil. Residents were told to stop cleaning wildlife and to completely avoid all lake water and well water, even for watering gardens and lawns. The 88,000 litres (19,000 imp gal; 23,000 US gal) of pole treating oil that had escaped from a ruptured, derailed tank car contained naphthalene and other polycyclic aromatic hydrocarbons listed as "highly toxic" and suspected of being carcinogens.

Further outrage and condemnation came against CN for not informing the community earlier of the hazard before many people were avoidably exposed. The provincial government weighed demands that it institute criminal charges against CN officers for the delay.

CN released a statement on October 18 that estimates the railroad's financial obligation for cleanup from the spill to cost an estimated $28 million, with remaining costs covered by insurance.

In spring 2006 after the ice melted additional clean-up operations began as tar balls began to surface.

On May 25, 2009, CN pleaded guilty to three charges related to the oil spill. The company, along with federal and provincial prosecutors, made a joint submission for fines totaling $1.4 million.

As of 2016, the lake has returned to near its pre-oil-spill condition. Water quality is good and the Alberta Health has lifted its ban on eating fish. However, Alberta Environment and Parks still maintains a zero-catch limit on all species of fish, presumably to protect the growing walleye population and the recovering lake whitefish stocks.

=== Unauthorized development ===
In January 2012, Alberta Environment and Sustainable Resource Development received a complaint about land being cleared and stripped near Fallis. An investigation revealed that trees adjacent to the lakeshore had been removed risking significant erosion of sediment into the lake. Uncontrolled erosion can increase the risk of eutrophication in lakes, which in turn can result in the formation of blue-green algae blooms.

Samco Developments was issued an order by the Government of Alberta in October 2012 pursuant to the Water Act to cease its unauthorized activities. The government also ordered Samco Developments and its directors to re-contour the land and replant vegetation to minimize sediment entering the lake. In a previous incident, Samco Developments was fined for using public land without authorization pursuant to the Public Lands Act.

== Sources ==
- CBC News: Province orders cleanup of Alberta oil spill
- Imperial Pole Treating Oil datasheet
- Wabamun Watch
- "Fixing Wabamun Lake"
- "Lake coughs up tar balls"
- CN Rail faces environmental charge in Wabamun Lake oil spill west of Edmonton
- Wabamun Lake Fishing Depth Map
