= Kapasiwin =

Kapasiwin Wabamun Beach (1913–1918)
- Summer village
- Summer Village of Kapasiwin
- Location of Kapasiwin in Alberta
- Coordinates: 53°32′45″N 114°26′41″W
- Country: Canada
- Province: Alberta
- Region: Edmonton Metropolitan Region
- Census division: No. 11

Government
  - Type: Municipal incorporation
  - Mayor: Tim Wiles
  - Governing body: Kapasiwin Summer Village Council

Area (2021)
  - Land: 0.33 km^{2} (0.13 sq mi)

Population (2021)
  - Total: 24
  - Density: 73.7/km^{2} (191/sq mi)
- Time zone: UTC−06:00 (Alberta Time)
- Postal code: T0E 2Y0
- Website: kapasiwinalberta.com

Kapasiwin (/kəˈpæsɪwɪn/) is a summer village in Alberta, Canada. It is located in the eastern shore of Wabamun Lake, south of Wabamun Lake Provincial Park and the Yellowhead Highway. The name derives from kapesiwin (ᑲᐯᓯᐃᐧᐣ), the Cree word for "campground". It was known as the Village of Wabamun Beach from 1913 to 1918 and was the first incorporated summer village in Alberta.

== History ==
Kapasiwin was originally incorporated on October 25, 1913 as the Village of Wabamun Beach. It was renamed to the Village Municipality of Kepasiwin on August 28, 1918. Recognizing that the village acted like a summer village, the Province of Alberta officially incorporated it as the Summer Village of Kapasiwin on September 1, 1993.

== Demographics ==
In the 2021 Census of Population conducted by Statistics Canada, the Summer Village of Kapasiwin had a population of 24 living in 16 of its 46 total private dwellings, a change of 140% from its 2016 population of 10. With a land area of 0.33 km^{2} (0.13 sq mi), it had a population density of 72.7/km^{2} (188.4/sq mi) in 2021.

In the 2016 Census of Population conducted by Statistics Canada, the Summer Village of Kapasiwin had a population of 10 living in 5 of its 41 total private dwellings, which represents no change from its 2011 population of 10. With a land area of 0.3 km^{2} (0.12 sq mi), it had a population density of 33.3/km^{2} (86.3/sq mi) in 2016.

== See also ==
- List of communities in Alberta
- List of summer villages in Alberta
- List of resort villages in Saskatchewan
