= Blackfoot, Alberta =

Blackfoot
- Hamlet
- Location of Blackfoot Blackfoot (Canada)
- Coordinates: 53°17′21″N 110°10′24″W
- Country: Canada
- Province: Alberta
- Region: Central Alberta
- Census division: 10
- Municipal district: County of Vermilion River

Government
  - Type: Unincorporated
  - Governing body: County of Vermilion River Council

Area (2021)
  - Land: 0.95 km^{2} (0.37 sq mi)

Population (2021)
  - Total: 386
  - Density: 406.2/km^{2} (1,052/sq mi)
- Time zone: UTC−06:00 (Alberta Time)
- Area codes: 403, 587, 825

Blackfoot is a hamlet in east-central Alberta, Canada within the County of Vermilion River. It is located 1 kilometre (0.62 mi) north of Highway 16, approximately 10 kilometres (6.2 mi) west of Lloydminster.

== History ==
The first post office opened in 1905 as "Blackfoot Hills" and changed to just "Blackfoot" in 1909. Telephone service was established in 1907.

== Demographics ==
Population history of Blackfoot
Year	Pop.	±%
1941	51	—
1951	69	+35.3%
1956	88	+27.5%
1961	91	+3.4%
1966	130	+42.9%
1971	175	+34.6%
1976	208	+18.9%
1981	220	+5.8%
1986	220	+0.0%
1991	183	−16.8%
1996	178	−2.7%
2001	195	+9.6%
2006	159	−18.5%
2011	269	+69.2%
2016	392	+45.7%
2016R	407	+3.8%
2021	386	−5.2%
Source: Statistics Canada

In the 2021 Census of Population conducted by Statistics Canada, Blackfoot had a population of 386 living in 139 of its 150 total private dwellings, a change of −5.2% from its 2016 population of 407. With a land area of 0.95 km^{2} (0.37 sq mi), it had a population density of 406.3/km^{2} (1,052.4/sq mi) in 2021.

As a designated place in the 2016 Census of Population conducted by Statistics Canada, Blackfoot had a population of 392 living in 146 of its 153 total private dwellings, a change of 45.7% from its 2011 population of 269. With a land area of 0.89 km^{2} (0.34 sq mi), it had a population density of 440.4/km^{2} (1,140.8/sq mi) in 2016.

The County of Vermilion River's 2015 municipal census counted a population of 420 in Blackfoot.

== See also ==
- List of communities in Alberta
- List of designated places in Alberta
- List of hamlets in Alberta
