= Ranfurly, Alberta =

Ranfurly
- Hamlet
- Location of Ranfurly Ranfurly (Canada)
- Coordinates: 53°24′26″N 111°40′47″W
- Country: Canada
- Province: Alberta
- Region: Central Alberta
- Census division: 10
- Municipal district: County of Minburn No. 27

Government
  - Type: Unincorporated
  - Governing body: County of Minburn No. 27 Council

Area (2021)
  - Land: 0.72 km^{2} (0.28 sq mi)

Population (2021)
  - Total: 71
  - Density: 98.6/km^{2} (255/sq mi)
- Time zone: UTC−06:00 (Alberta Time)
- Area codes: 780, 587, 825

Ranfurly is a hamlet in central Alberta, Canada within the County of Minburn No. 27. Previously an incorporated municipality, Ranfurly dissolved from village status on January 1, 1946 to become part of the Municipal District of Birch Lake No. 484.

Ranfurly is located 1 kilometre (0.62 mi) north of Highway 16, approximately 121 kilometres (75 mi) east of Edmonton. It has an elevation of 670 m (2,200 ft).

== Demographics ==
In the 2021 Census of Population conducted by Statistics Canada, Ranfurly had a population of 71 living in 33 of its 35 total private dwellings, a change of 26.8% from its 2016 population of 56. With a land area of 0.72 km^{2} (0.28 sq mi), it had a population density of 98.6/km^{2} (255.4/sq mi) in 2021.

As a designated place in the 2016 Census of Population conducted by Statistics Canada, Ranfurly had a population of 56 living in 28 of its 34 total private dwellings, a change of −18.8% from its 2011 population of 69. With a land area of 0.75 km^{2} (0.29 sq mi), it had a population density of 74.7/km^{2} (193.4/sq mi) in 2016.

== Climate ==
Climate data for Ranfurly
Month	Jan	Feb	Mar	Apr	May	Jun	Jul	Aug	Sep	Oct	Nov	Dec	Year
Record high °C (°F)	15 (59)	13.3 (55.9)	22.8 (73.0)	33.3 (91.9)	36.1 (97.0)	36.7 (98.1)	40.6 (105.1)	37.2 (99.0)	34.5 (94.1)	30 (86)	22.8 (73.0)	13.9 (57.0)	40.6 (105.1)
Mean daily maximum °C (°F)	−9.5 (14.9)	−6.8 (19.8)	−0.5 (31.1)	10.2 (50.4)	17.9 (64.2)	21.1 (70.0)	22.7 (72.9)	21.8 (71.2)	15.7 (60.3)	10.3 (50.5)	−1.6 (29.1)	−8 (18)	7.8 (46.0)
Mean daily minimum °C (°F)	−19.4 (−2.9)	−16.9 (1.6)	−10.5 (13.1)	−1.6 (29.1)	4.5 (40.1)	8.5 (47.3)	10.6 (51.1)	9.2 (48.6)	4.1 (39.4)	−0.9 (30.4)	−10.1 (13.8)	−17.4 (0.7)	−3.3 (26.1)
Record low °C (°F)	−49.4 (−56.9)	−51.2 (−60.2)	−42.2 (−44.0)	−32.2 (−26.0)	−14.4 (6.1)	−5.6 (21.9)	−3.9 (25.0)	−4.4 (24.1)	−14.4 (6.1)	−28.3 (−18.9)	−40.6 (−41.1)	−47.2 (−53.0)	−51.2 (−60.2)
Average precipitation mm (inches)	20.4 (0.80)	12.5 (0.49)	19.9 (0.78)	19.9 (0.78)	43.2 (1.70)	79.2 (3.12)	72.4 (2.85)	65 (2.6)	41.8 (1.65)	14.5 (0.57)	14.1 (0.56)	23.8 (0.94)	426.6 (16.80)
Average snowfall cm (inches)	19.3 (7.6)	12.1 (4.8)	18.7 (7.4)	13.3 (5.2)	2.4 (0.9)	0 (0)	0 (0)	0 (0)	2 (0.8)	7.5 (3.0)	12.1 (4.8)	22.7 (8.9)	110.2 (43.4)
Source: Environment Canada

== See also ==
- List of communities in Alberta
- List of designated places in Alberta
- List of former urban municipalities in Alberta
- List of hamlets in Alberta
