= Wabamun Lake Provincial Park =

Provincial park in Alberta, Canada

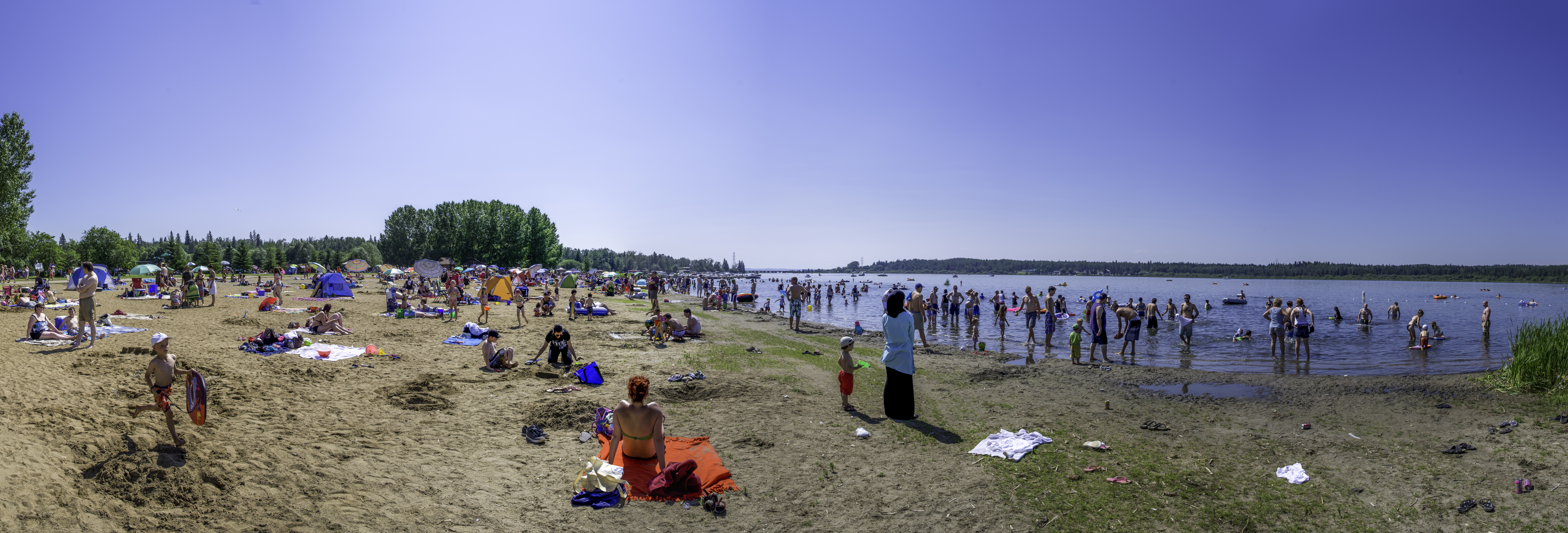

- Location within Alberta
- Interactive map of Wabamun Lake Provincial Park
- Location: Parkland County, Alberta, Canada
- Nearest city: Wabamun
- Coordinates: 53°33′46″N 114°26′09″W
- Area: 2.6 km^{2} (1.0 sq mi)
- Governing body: Alberta Tourism, Parks and Recreation

Wabamun Lake Provincial Park is a provincial park in Alberta, Canada.

It is located on the north-eastern shore of Wabamun Lake, near the hamlet of Wabamun, bordering the Yellowhead Highway.

== Activities ==
The following activities are available in the park:

- Baseball and soccer
- Beach activities (swimming, water-skiing and windsurfing)
- Birdwatching (hooded merganser, bald eagle, mallard, gull, tern, rail, heron, loon, kingfisher, sandpiper, nesting osprey, red-necked grebe, western grebe, raven, Canada jay, great grey owl)
- Camping
- Canoeing and kayaking
- Fishing (stickleback, burbot, Iowa darter, lake whitefish, northern pike, shiner, walleye, white sucker, yellow perch)
- Front country hiking (with boardwalks in day use area)
- Power boating and sailing

== See also ==
- List of provincial parks in Alberta
- List of Canadian provincial parks
- List of National Parks of Canada
