= Fallis, Alberta =

Fallis
- Hamlet
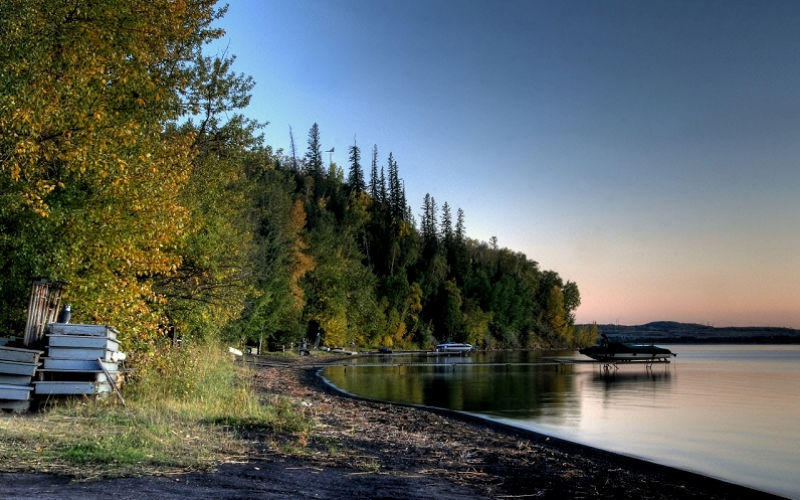

- Location within Parkland County Location within Alberta
- Coordinates: 53°35′07″N 114°38′27″W
- Country: Canada
- Province: Alberta
- Region: Central Alberta
- Census division: No. 11
- Municipal district: Parkland County
- Founded: 1910

Population (2009)
  - Total: 54
- Time zone: UTC−06:00 (Alberta Time)
- Postal code: T0E 0V0
- Area codes: 780

Fallis is a hamlet in central Alberta, Canada within Parkland County. It is located on Highway 16, approximately 49 kilometres (30 mi) west of Spruce Grove. Fallis is home to the St. Aidan and St. Hilda Anglican Church which is a registered historic place.

== History ==
The first post office at Fallis was established in 1910. It was named for Mr. W.S. Fallis, an executive of the paint manufacturer, Sherwin Williams Company of Canada.

== Demographics ==
The population of Fallis according to the 2009 municipal census conducted by Parkland County is 54.

== See also ==
- List of communities in Alberta
- List of hamlets in Alberta
