= Highvale, Alberta =

Locality in Alberta, Canada

Coordinates: 53.45013°N 114.50209°W

Highvale is a locality in Alberta, Canada.

The community's name was inspired by Highgate, Ontario, the native home of an early postmaster.
