= Gemeinde (theology) =

In theological usage, the German word Gemeinde (German: [ɡəˈmaɪndə]; plural: Gemeinden) refers to a group of people attached to a specific house of worship, usually a church building or a synagogue. The word can be used to mean a parish assembly, in the sense of a group of people physically present for a service or other function, or be used in the sense of the Greek term koinonia, a general fellowship of believers. In these senses, the word has no direct English equivalent except among Mormons, who call it a ward.

Among the Amish, the word can also refer to the Amish community, interpreted as a corporate body politic, as a whole.

In terms of Jewish communities, the word can refer to the community level of Jewish life, as established in pre-World War II Germany.

== See also ==
- Church (congregation)
