= Obed, Alberta =

Obed
- Unincorporated community
- Location of Obed in Alberta
- Coordinates: 53°33′07″N 117°14′07″W
- Country: Canada
- Province: Alberta
- Census division: No. 14
- Municipal district: Yellowhead County

Government
  - Type: Unincorporated

Area (2021)
  - Land: 0.67 km^{2} (0.26 sq mi)

Population (2021)
  - Total: 34
  - Density: 50.9/km^{2} (132/sq mi)
- Time zone: UTC−06:00 (Alberta Time)

Obed is an unincorporated community in west-central Alberta, Canada within Yellowhead County. It lies 50 km west of Edson via the Yellowhead Highway.

Obed Lake and Obed Lake Provincial Park are located immediately east of the community.

== Demographics ==
In the 2021 Census of Population conducted by Statistics Canada, Obed had a population of 34 living in 13 of its 13 total private dwellings, a change of 240% from its 2016 population of 10. With a land area of 0.67 km^{2} (0.26 sq mi), it had a population density of 50.7/km^{2} (131.4/sq mi) in 2021.

As a designated place in the 2016 Census of Population conducted by Statistics Canada, Obed had a population of 10 living in 6 of its 7 total private dwellings, a change of −41.2% from its 2011 population of 17. With a land area of 0.71 km^{2} (0.27 sq mi), it had a population density of 14.1/km^{2} (36.5/sq mi) in 2016.

== See also ==
- List of communities in Alberta
- List of designated places in Alberta
