= County of Minburn No. 27 =

Municipal district in Alberta, Canada

- Municipal district
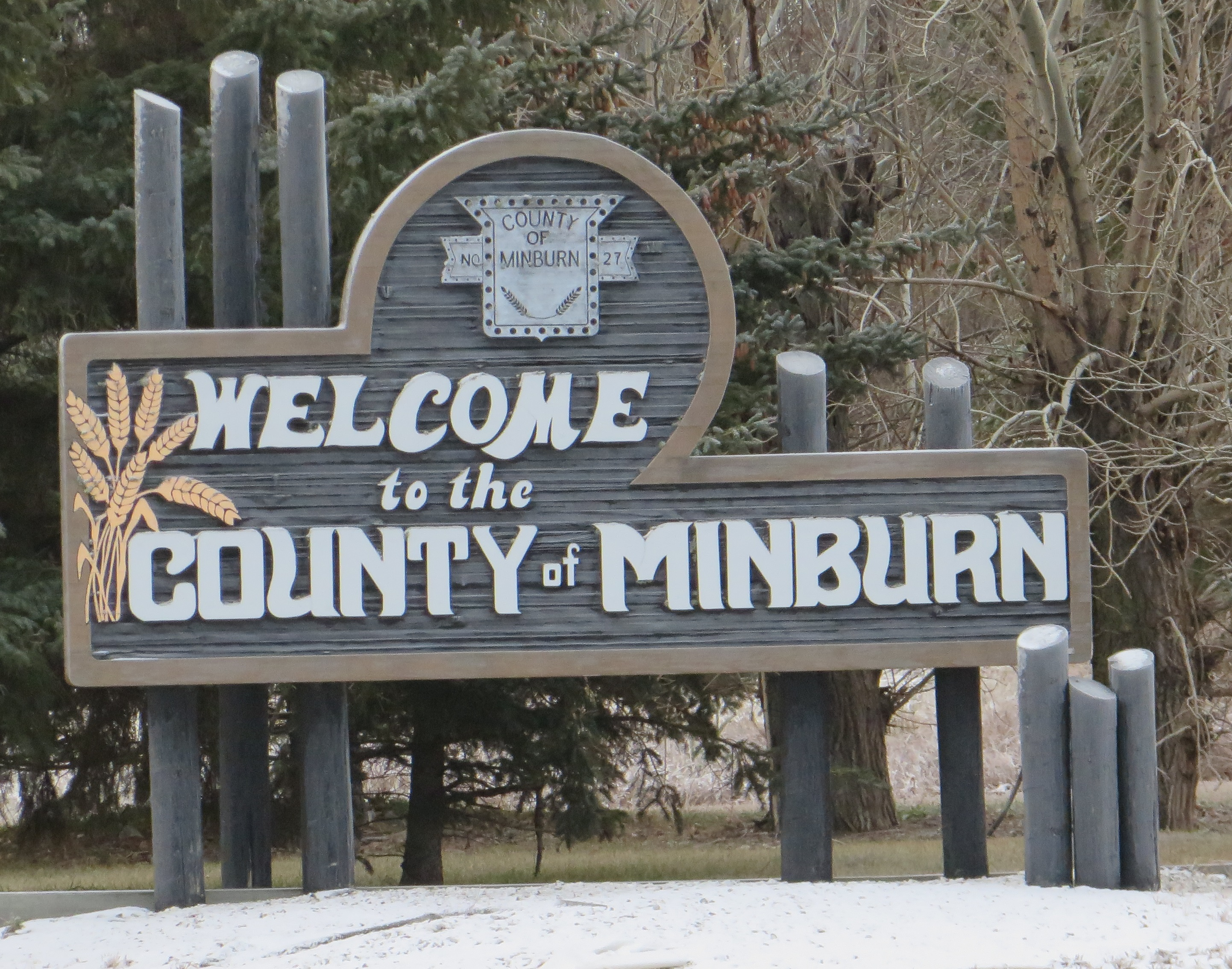
- Welcome sign

- Location within Alberta
- Coordinates: 53°29′34″N 112°03′8″W
- Country: Canada
- Province: Alberta
- Region: Central Alberta
- Census division: 10
- Established: 1942
- Incorporated: 1965 (County)

Government
  - Reeve: Roger Konieczny
  - Governing body: County of Minburn Council
  - Administrative office: Vegreville

Area (2021)
  - Land: 2,850.37 km^{2} (1,100.53 sq mi)

Population (2021)
  - Total: 3,014
  - Density: 1.1/km^{2} (2.8/sq mi)
- Time zone: UTC−06:00 (Alberta Time)
- Website: Official website

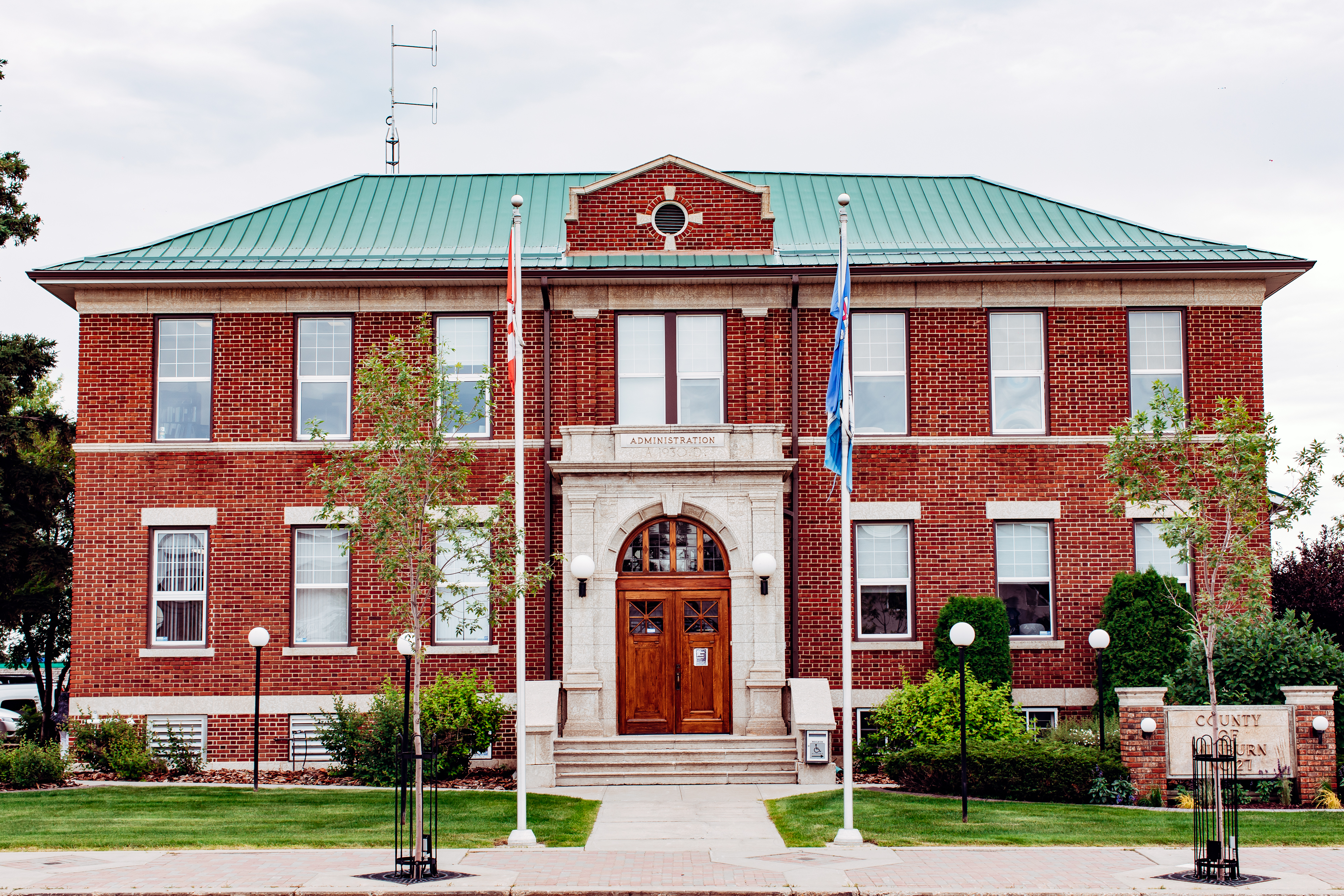
Municipal office in Vegreville

The County of Minburn No. 27 is a municipal district in east central Alberta, Canada. Its municipal office is located in the Town of Vegreville. Located in Census Division No. 10, the County of Minburn No. 27 was formed as a county on January 1, 1965, from the former Municipal District of Minburn No. 72.

== Geography ==
=== Communities and localities ===
The following urban municipalities are surrounded by the County of Minburn No. 27.

Cities

- none

Towns

- Vegreville

Villages

- Innisfree
- Mannville

Summer villages

- none

The following hamlets are located within the County of Minburn No. 27.

Hamlets

- Lavoy (dissolved from village status in 1999)
- Minburn (dissolved from village status in 2015)
- Ranfurly

The following localities are located within the County of Minburn No. 27.

Localities

- Brookwood Estates
- Chailey
- Cummings
- Fitzallen
- Inland
- Lake Geneva
- New Kiew
- Prairie Lodge Trailer Court (designated place)
- Royal Park
- Warwick

Other places

- Brush Hill

== Demographics ==
In the 2021 Census of Population conducted by Statistics Canada, the County of Minburn No. 27 had a population of 3,014 living in 1,138 of its 1,337 total private dwellings, a change of −5.5% from its 2016 population of 3,188. With a land area of 2,850.37 km^{2} (1,100.53 sq mi), it had a population density of 1.1/km^{2} (2.7/sq mi) in 2021.

In the 2016 Census of Population conducted by Statistics Canada, the County of Minburn No. 27 had a population of 3,188 living in 1,184 of its 1,380 total private dwellings, a −5.8% change from its 2011 population of 3,383. With a land area of 2,913.02 km^{2} (1,124.72 sq mi), it had a population density of 1.1/km^{2} (2.8/sq mi) in 2016.

== See also ==
- List of communities in Alberta
- List of municipal districts in Alberta
