= Wabamun, Alberta =

Wabamun
- Hamlet
- Hamlet of Wabamun
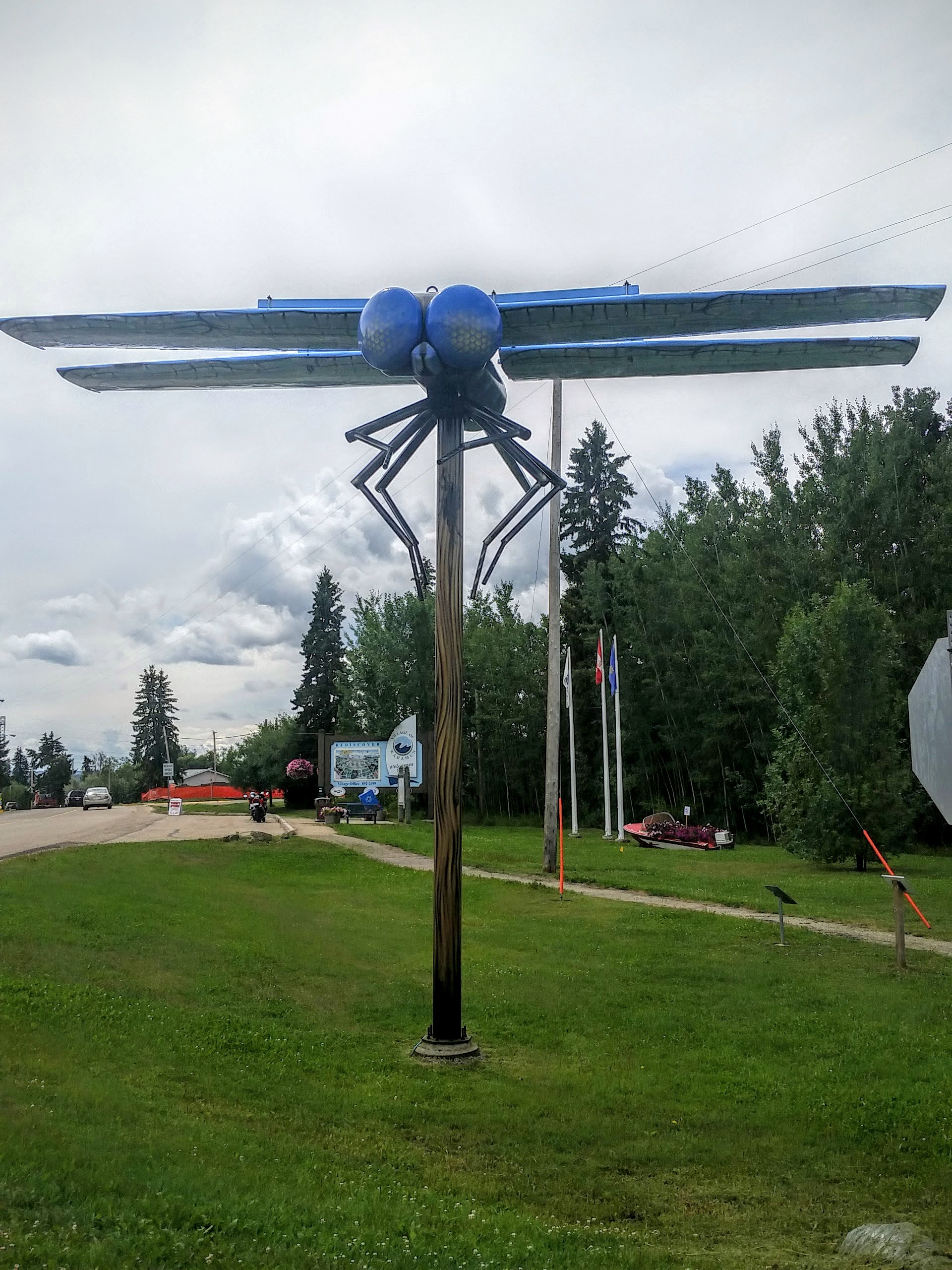
- Dragonfly sculpture in Wabamun

- Location of Wabamun in Alberta
- Coordinates: 53°33′28″N 114°28′06″W
- Country: Canada
- Province: Alberta
- Region: Edmonton Metropolitan Region
- Census division: 11
- Municipal district: Parkland County
- Incorporated
  - Village: July 18, 1912
  - Dissolution: January 1, 1946
  - Village: January 1, 1980
  - Dissolution: January 1, 2021
- Founder: Grand Trunk Pacific Railway
- Named for: Wabamun Lake

Area (2016)
  - Land: 3.58 km^{2} (1.38 sq mi)
- Elevation: 740 m (2,430 ft)

Population (2016)
  - Total: 682
  - Density: 190.5/km^{2} (493/sq mi)
- Time zone: UTC−06:00 (Alberta Time)
- Area code: +1-780
- Highways: Highway 16
- Waterway: Wabamun Lake
- Website: wabamun.ca

Wabamun /ˈwɑːbəmən/ is a hamlet in central Alberta, Canada within Parkland County. It is approximately 67 kilometres (42 mi) west of Edmonton on Highway 16. It held village status prior to 2021.

== History ==
Wabamun was named for its location on the north shore of Wabamun Lake. The first post office opened in Wabamun in 1903. In the early 1900s, Wabamun was a railway stop for homesteaders. Many brought goods and animals on train cars as far as Wabamun and then transferred to wagons drawn by oxen or horses for the remainder of trips to homesteads in the Lac Ste. Anne area.

In 1984, it hosted the first ever Grand North American Old Time Fiddle Championship, which acted as a fundraiser for the community.

Wabamun has twice incorporated as a village and twice dissolved from village status. Wabamun first incorporated as a village on July 18, 1912. It then relinquished its village status on January 1, 1946. Wabamun incorporated as a village a second time on January 1, 1980. It relinquished its village status for a second time on January 1, 2021, when it dissolved to become a hamlet under the jurisdiction of Parkland County.

== Demographics ==
Historical population
Year	Pop.	±%
2001	601	—
2006	601	+0.0%
2011	661	+10.0%
2016	682	+3.2%

In the 2016 Census of Population conducted by Statistics Canada, Wabamun recorded a population of 682 living in 270 of its 290 total private dwellings, a 3.2% change from its 2011 population of 661. With a land area of 3.58 km^{2} (1.38 sq mi), it had a population density of 190.5/km^{2} (493.4/sq mi) in 2016.

In the 2011 Census, Wabamun had a population of 661 living in 265 of its 295 total dwellings, a 10% change from its 2006 population of 601. With a land area of 3.24 km^{2} (1.25 sq mi), it had a population density of 204.0/km^{2} (528.4/sq mi) in 2011.

The population of Wabamun according to its 2009 municipal census is 662.

== Economy ==
The main source of income within Wabamun are power plants in the area operated by TransAlta Utilities. The power plant within Wabamun was closed because of increased pressure from environmental agencies and aging. The Wabamun power plant was the subject of heated debate among the residents and cottagers of Wabamun Lake. Due to the lack of a cool–off pond, the water used to cool the internal systems was deposited back into the lake, which enhanced the weed population dramatically.

As of March 31, 2010, the Wabamun Generating Station was decommissioned, with the smoke stacks being demolished on March 18, 2017.

=== Tourism ===
A large cabin-going community exists in Wabamun during the summer, while the community is populated year round. Local sites include Wabamun Lake, Waterfront Park, the Wabamun Marina, the 120-metre (380 ft) pier and world's largest dragonfly. Businesses include four restaurants, hardware store, bowling lanes, post office, pharmacy, senior centre, realtor, liquor store, market, car wash, laundromat, motel, hotel, inn, tavern, bottle depot, convenience store, two banks, mechanic and a grocery store.

As of 2011 there were plans for development to promote the community as a major visitor destination in central Alberta. These plans included further expansion of Waterfront Park, the largest boat launch on the lake, as well as Discovery Wharf, a project that would see the development of approximately 0.40 km^{2} (100 acres) of lakefront property.

The lake itself is populated with northern pike, walleye, whitefish, yellow perch, and white suckers.

The main sailing club of the lake is Wabamun Sailing Club, approximately 8 kilometres (5.0 mi) west of the community at the end of Range Road 43. A smaller club is on the opposite shore of the lake.

It is home to "Canada's largest dragonfly", a metal statue similar to other attractions to be found across the region.

== Oil spill ==
On August 3, 2005, 45 cars of a CN Rail train derailed on the shores of Wabamun Lake, west of Wabamun, spilling their contents of more than 700,000 litres of a variety of fuel oils and pole treating oils into the lake.

== Infrastructure ==
- Wabamun and District Museum
- Wabamun Public Library
- Wabamun School - Parkland School Division (K-9)
- Waterfront Park - lake-shore access, parking and full-sized boat launch, picnic area with shelter, washrooms and change rooms, playground and water spray park water spray park.

== See also ==
- List of communities in Alberta
- List of hamlets in Alberta
