= Seba Beach =

- Summer village
- Summer Village of Seba Beach
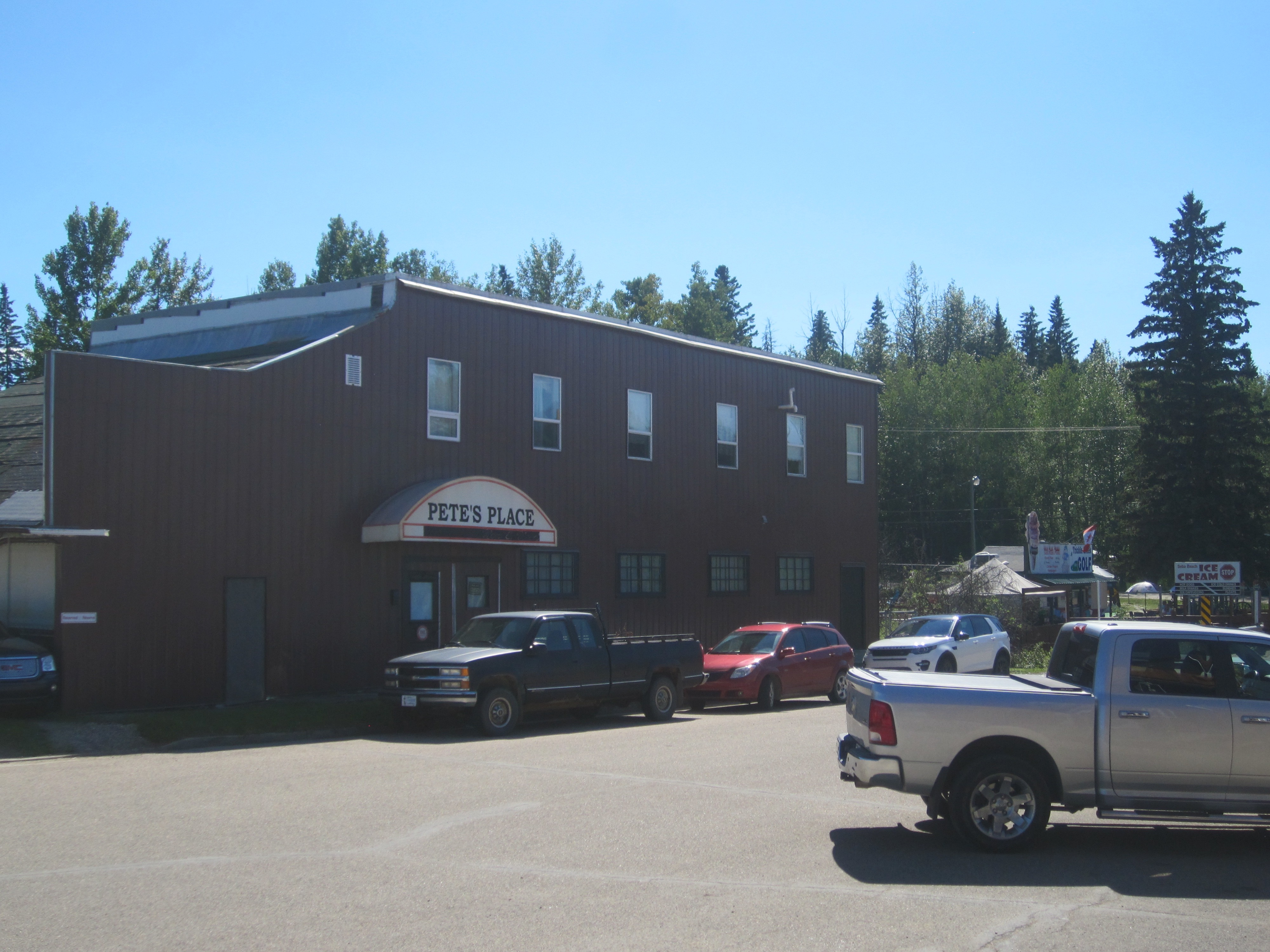

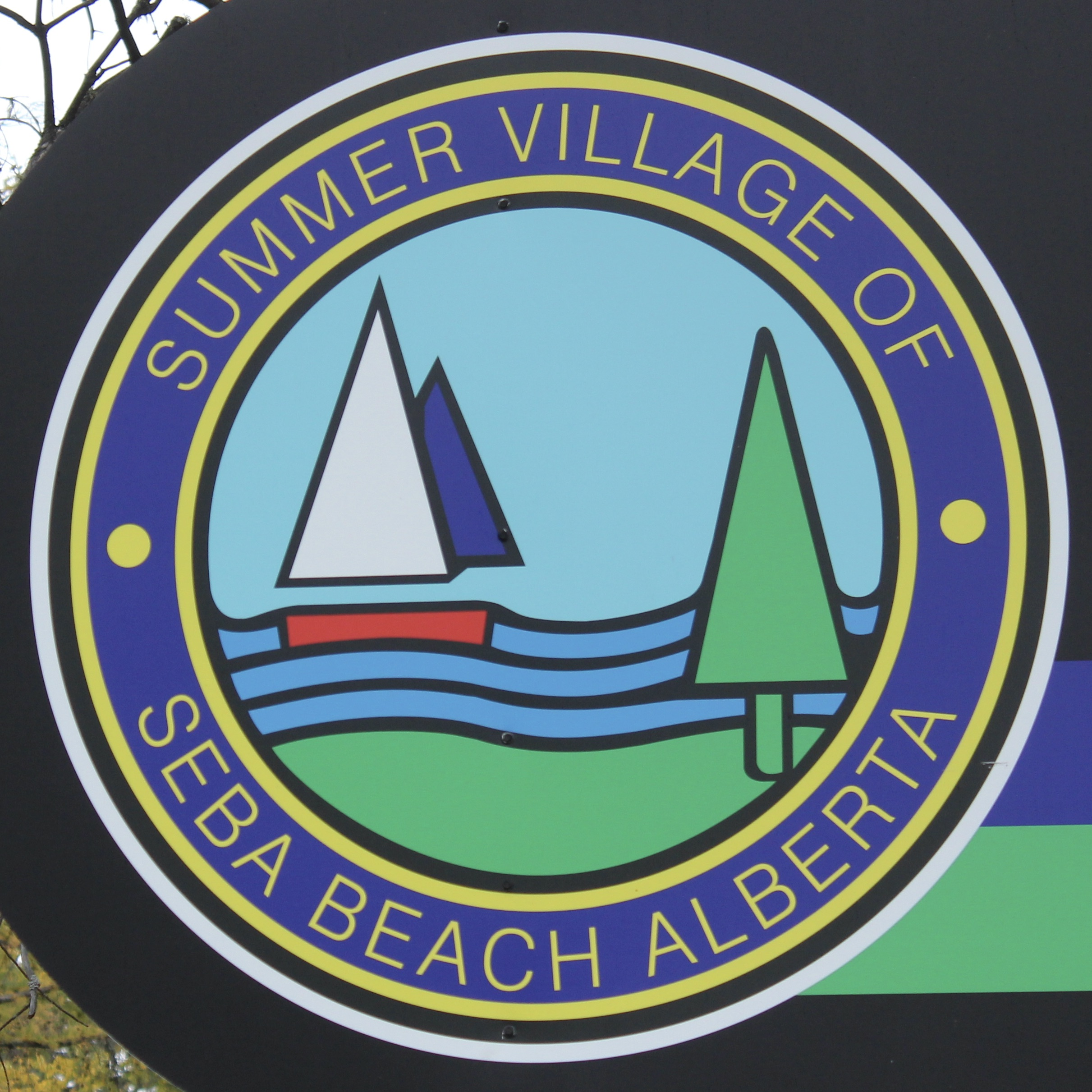
- Seal

- Location of Seba Beach in Alberta
- Coordinates: 53.56075°N 114.73692°W
- Country: Canada
- Province: Alberta
- Region: Edmonton Metropolitan Region
- Census division: No. 11
- Incorporated: August 2, 1920

Government
  - Type: Municipal incorporation
  - Mayor: Rick MacPhee
  - Governing body: Seba Beach Summer Village Council

Area (2021)
  - Land: 0.53 km^{2} (0.20 sq mi)
- Elevation: 745 m (2,444 ft)

Population (2021)
  - Total: 229
  - Density: 428.4/km^{2} (1,110/sq mi)
- Time zone: UTC−06:00 (Alberta Time)
- Postal code span: T0E 2B0
- Area code: 780
- Website: www.sebabeach.ca

Seba Beach is a summer village located 85 km (53 mi) west of Edmonton in Alberta, Canada on the shore of Wabamun lake. The main employer to those within the village and surrounding area is the Sundance Generating Plant, a coal-fired power plant located on the south side of the lake, owned and operated by TransAlta Utilities.

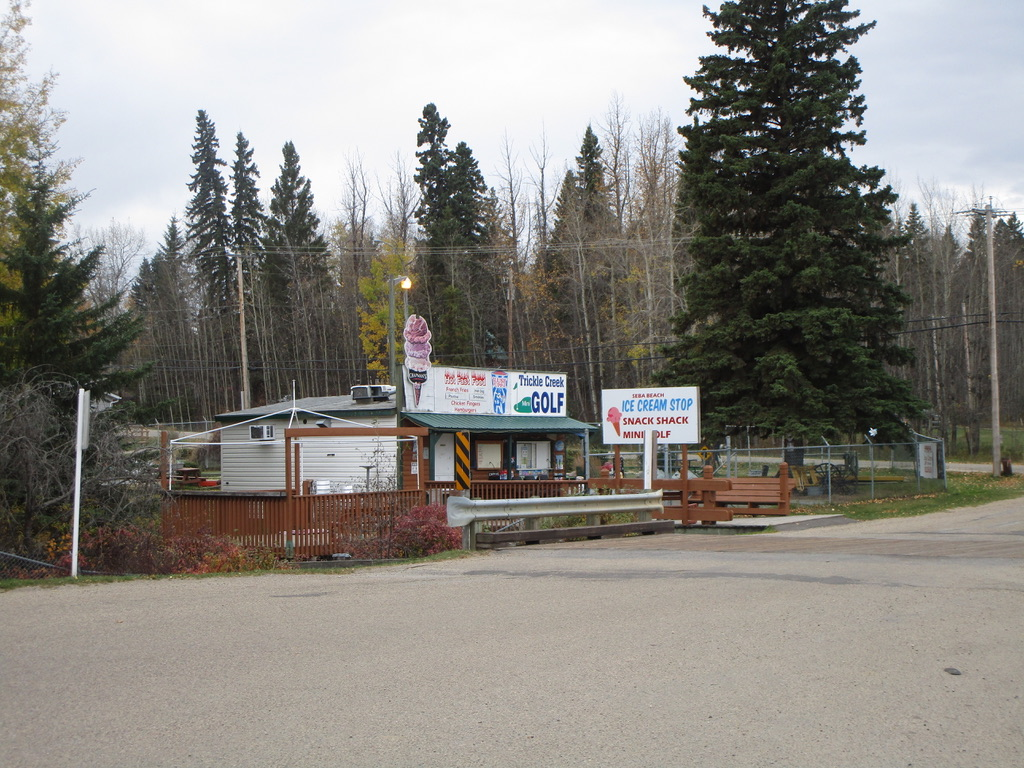
Trickle Creek Mini Golf during the off season

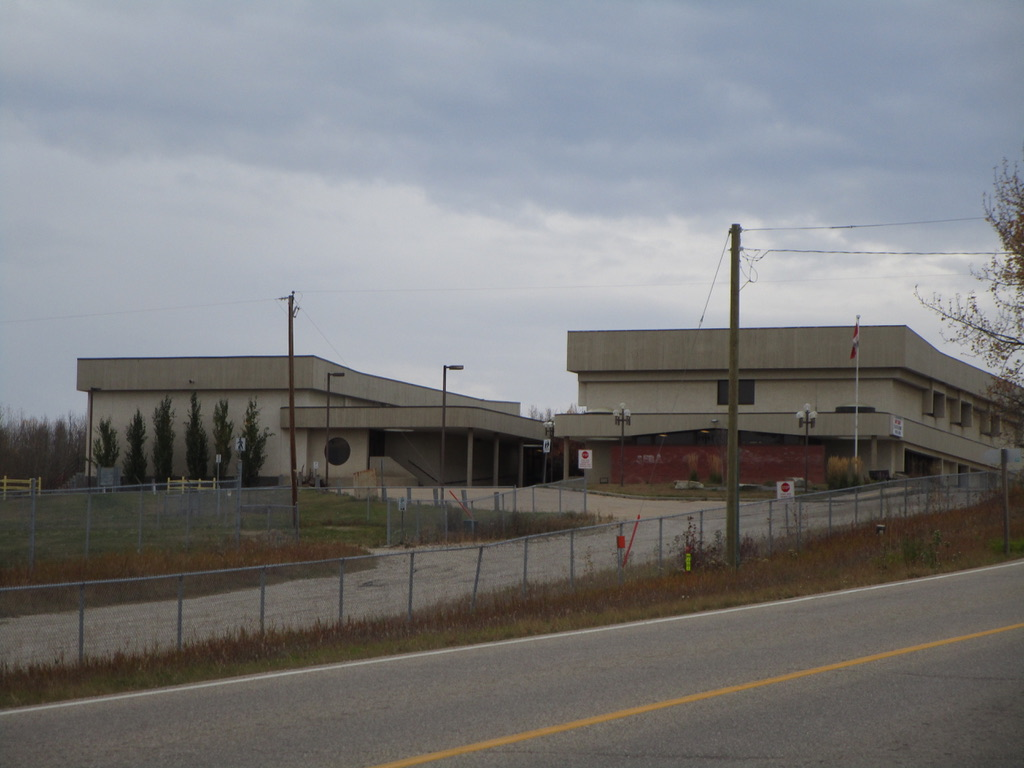
The old Seba Beach school, closed in 2019 is now used as a rental space

A large cabin-going community exists during the summer, although the village is populated year round. The village features a museum, marina, public beach, municipal building featuring a firehall and a library, thrift store, RV campground, golf resort, a miniature golf course, a general store, and a farmers market which is open at certain dates during the summer. The village used to have a school, but lack of attending students forced it to close in 2019 with the affected students locating to nearby schools: Entwistle, Tomahawk, and Wabamun.

Seba Beach is one of the few summer villages in Alberta that employs community peace officers. The duties of its two peace officers include traffic and liquor enforcement as well as emergency response.

August long weekend is the annual Regatta at Seba Beach, which features a parade, dance, foot races, fireworks, beach volleyball tournament, and cribbage tournament, among other events.

Fish within Wabamun lake include northern pike, whitefish, walleye, and yellow perch.

== History ==
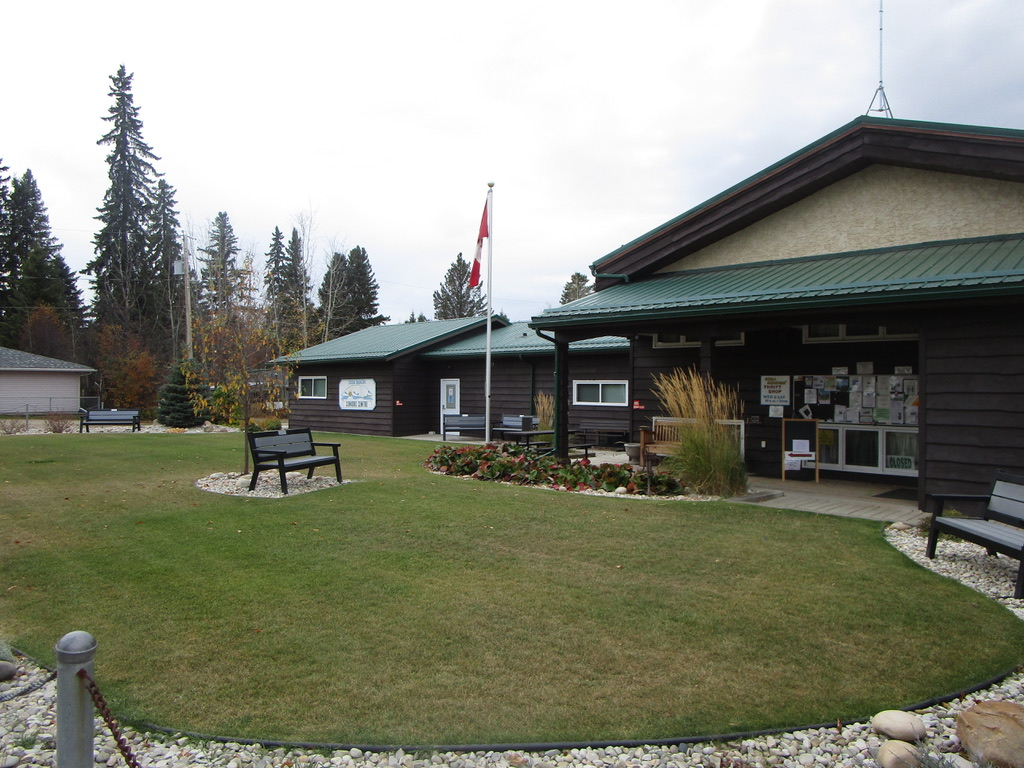
The Seniors Centre offers a community hall for the local seniors, as well as a thrift store ran by the seniors

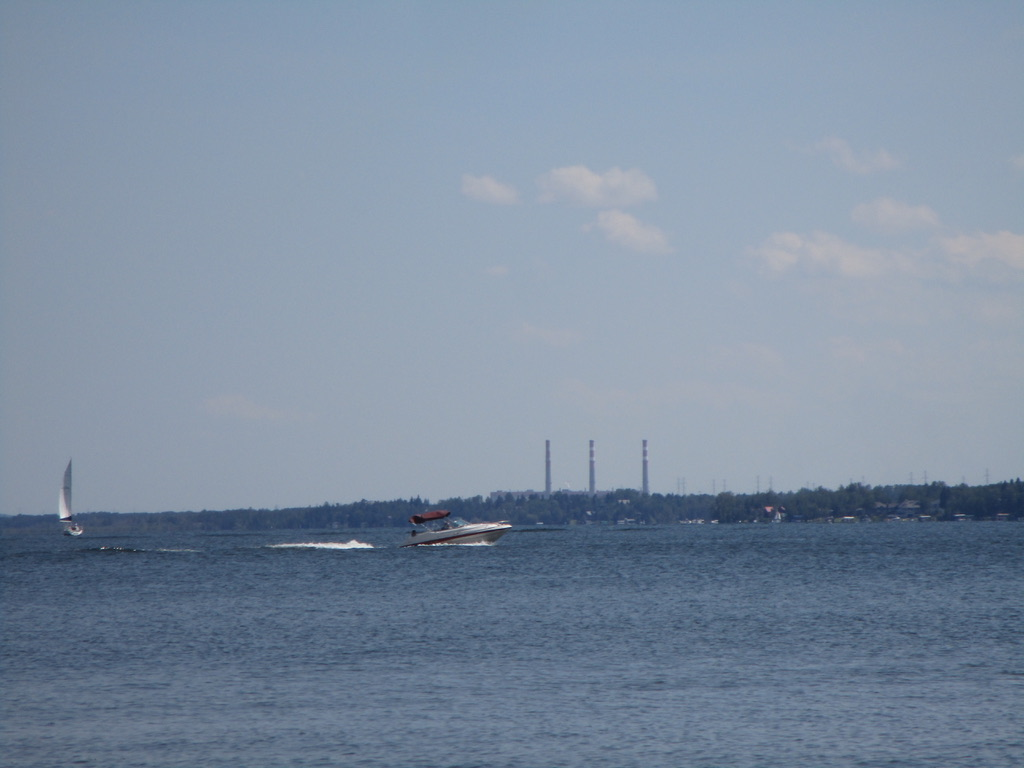
Seba Beach offers summer getaways for many Edmontonians

Seba Beach started as a couple of cabins in 1906, but during the 1920s when the railway passed by it became more accessible and the population grew. Seba Beach got its name from one of the sons of Cush in the Old Testament. Early Seba Beach featured a hotel, bakery, post office, dance hall, a church (the building which the current museum is in), mink farm, and Twig's Inn, which served as both an inn and a gas station. Commercial ice fishing occurred during the winter months, and during the summer many different festivals and events were held which drew in large numbers from Edmonton.

== Demographics ==
In the 2021 Census of Population conducted by Statistics Canada, the Summer Village of Seba Beach had a population of 229 living in 128 of its 333 total private dwellings, a change of 35.5% from its 2016 population of 169. With a land area of 0.53 km^{2} (0.20 sq mi), it had a population density of 432.1/km^{2} (1,119.1/sq mi) in 2021.

In the 2016 Census of Population conducted by Statistics Canada, the Summer Village of Seba Beach had a population of 169 living in 82 of its 323 total private dwellings, a change of 18.2% from its 2011 population of 143. With a land area of 0.86 km^{2} (0.33 sq mi), it had a population density of 196.5/km^{2} (509.0/sq mi) in 2016.

== Edmonton Yacht Club ==
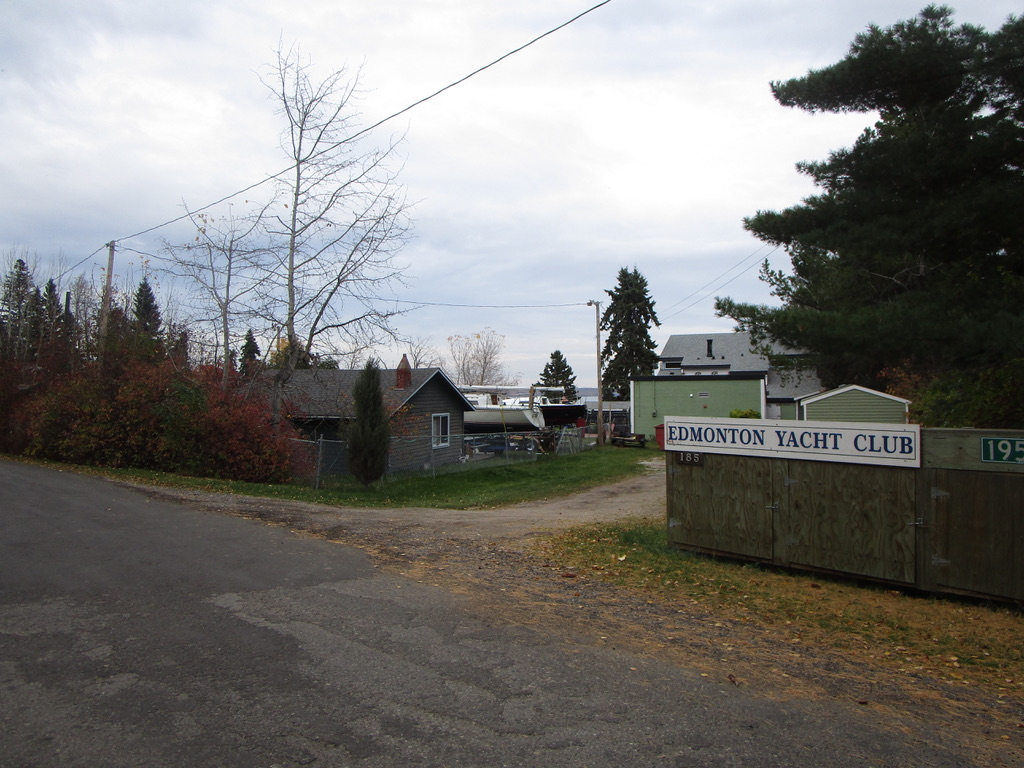
Edmonton Yacht Club during the fall

The Edmonton Yacht Club, founded in 1923, is the main sailing club of Seba Beach, located at 1 Avenue and 2 Street West. In 1989, Margaret Lemieux compiled Wind in the Sails: The Edmonton Yacht Club, 1923–1981, which documented the history of the Edmonton Yacht Club and sailing in Alberta during this time period, published through the Seba Beach Heritage Society from records of the Edmonton Yacht Club from Cooking Lake and Seba Beach.

== Notable residents ==
- Lawrence Lemieux, sailor, who competed at the 1984 Summer Olympics in the Star class and at the 1988 Summer Olympics in the Finn class

== See also ==
- List of communities in Alberta
- List of francophone communities in Alberta
- List of resort villages in Saskatchewan
- List of summer villages in Alberta
