= Yellowhead Highway =

Highway in Western Canada

Yellowhead Highway
- Route Yellowhead; Trans-Canada Highway
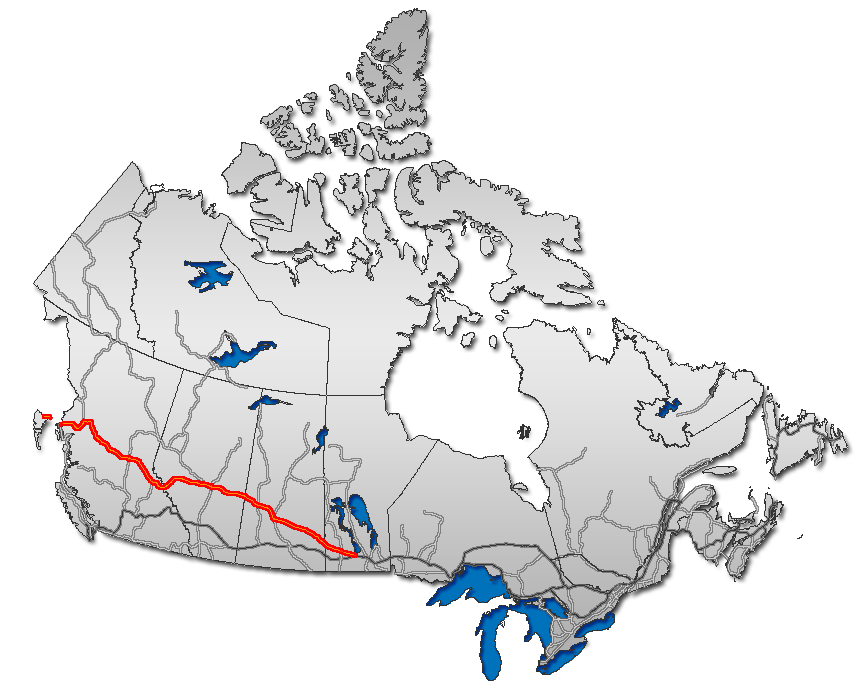

Route information
- Length: 2,859 km (1,777 mi)
- History: Established in 1970; Renumbered to Hwy 16 in 1976; Trans-Canada Highway in 1990

Major junctions
- West end: Hodges Avenue / Towhill Road in Masset, BC
- Highway 97 in Prince George, BC; Highway 5 near Tête Jaune Cache, BC; Highway 43 near Stony Plain, AB; Highway 216 in Edmonton, AB; Highway 2 in Edmonton, AB; Highway 11 in Saskatoon, SK; PTH 1 (TCH) near Portage la Prairie, MB; PTH 100 (TCH) in Winnipeg, MB
- East end: Route 52 in Winnipeg, MB

Location
- Country: Canada
- Provinces: British Columbia, Alberta, Saskatchewan, Manitoba

Highway system
National Highway System
Trans-Canada Highway

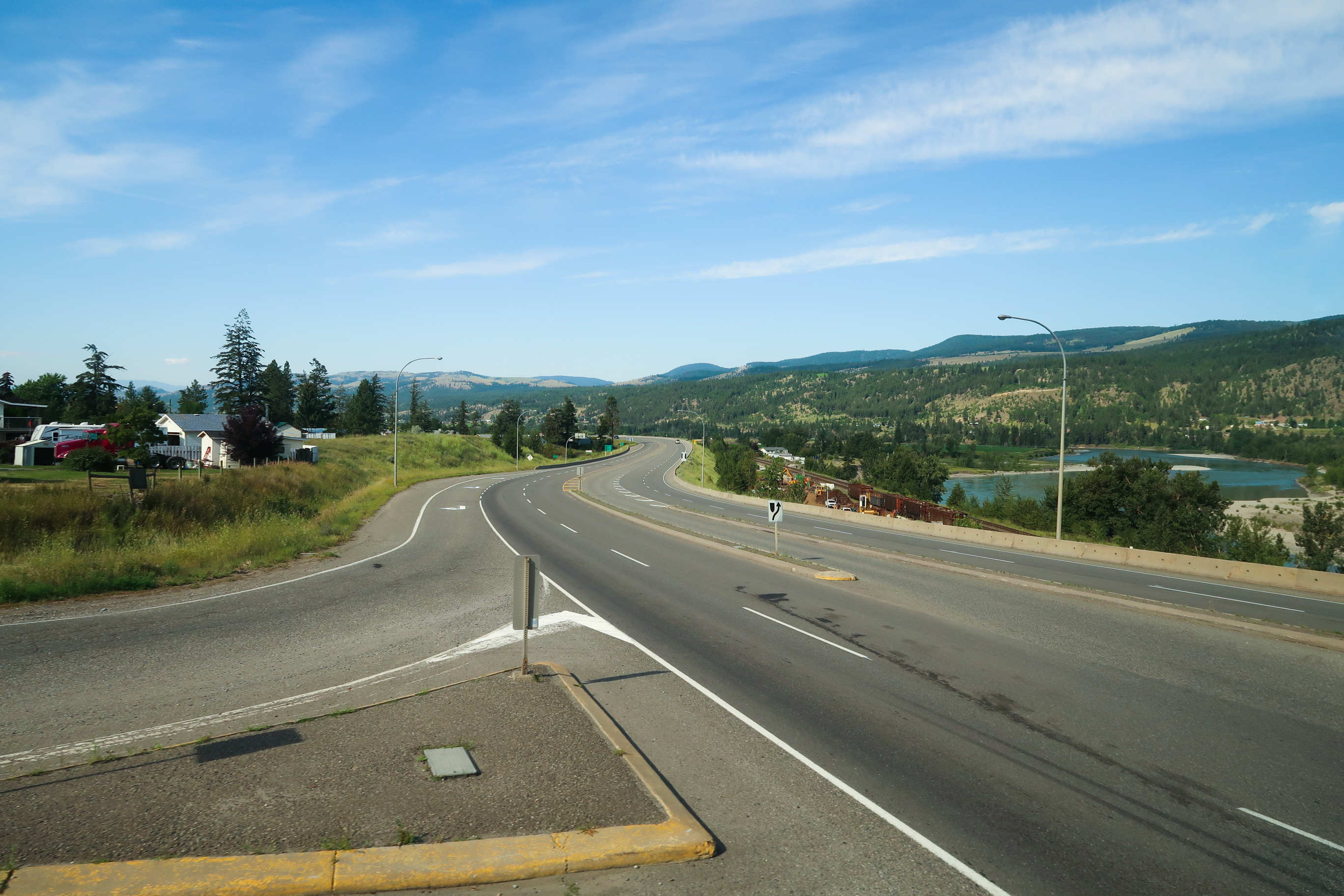
Southern Yellowhead Highway near Heffley Creek, British Columbia

The Yellowhead Highway (French: Route Yellowhead) is a major interprovincial highway in Western Canada that runs from Winnipeg, Manitoba, west to Graham Island off the coast of British Columbia via Saskatoon, Saskatchewan, and Edmonton, Alberta. It stretches across the four western provinces: British Columbia, Alberta, Saskatchewan, and Manitoba, and is part of the Trans-Canada Highway system and the larger National Highway System, but should not be confused with the more southerly, originally-designated Trans-Canada Highway. The highway was officially opened in 1970. Beginning in 1990, the green and white Trans-Canada logo is used to designate the roadway.

The highway is named for the Yellowhead Pass, the route chosen to cross the Canadian Rockies. The pass and the highway are named after a fur trader and explorer, Pierre Bostonais. He had yellow streaks in his hair, and was nicknamed "Tête Jaune" (Yellowhead). Almost the entire length of the highway is numbered as 16, except for the section in Manitoba that is concurrent with Trans-Canada Highway 1.

The highway number "16" is also the number given to a branch of the Trans-Canada in New Brunswick; Route 16. However, the numeric designation is strictly coincidental, and New Brunswick Route 16 is not part of the Yellowhead.

== Route description ==
Lengths
	km	mi
BC	1,170	730
AB	634	394
SK	689	428
MB	366	227
Total	2,859	1,777

=== British Columbia and Alberta ===
In the west, the highway begins at Masset, British Columbia, on Haida Gwaii, heading south along Graham Island for 101 kilometres (63 mi) to Skidegate. It then connects via a 93-nautical-mile-long (172 km; 107 mi) BC Ferries route to Prince Rupert, then passes southeastward for 724 kilometres (450 mi) through to Prince George, before travelling another 268 kilometres (167 mi) eastward through to Tête Jaune Cache.

A spur of the Yellowhead Highway, Highway 5, also known as the Southern Yellowhead Highway, connects the main Yellowhead Highway at Tête Jaune Cache midway between the Alberta–British Columbia border and Prince George. The highway continues past Kamloops before following the Coquihalla Highway to Hope. Unlike Highway 16, route 5 is not branded as being part of the Trans-Canada system and retains the original Yellowhead signage (whereas Highway 16 uses the Trans-Canada Highway logo).

The highway enters Alberta through the Rocky Mountains near Jasper, about 100 kilometres (62 mi) from Tête Jaune Cache, passes through Edmonton 366 kilometres (227 mi) further east, and travels another 250 kilometres (160 mi) before entering Saskatchewan at Lloydminster. The highest point on the Yellowhead Highway, at 1,163.9 metres (3,819 ft), is Obed Summit near Obed, Alberta.

=== Saskatchewan and Manitoba ===
The highway travels southeast for 282 kilometres (175 mi) to Saskatchewan's largest city, Saskatoon, passing through North Battleford about halfway in between. Beyond Saskatoon, the Yellowhead Highway continues its southeastern journey through the province for 329 kilometres (204 mi) to Yorkton. The highway continues for another 90 kilometres (56 mi) from Yorkton and enters Manitoba sixteen kilometres (9.9 mi) northwest of Russell.

Within Manitoba, the highway travels 273 kilometres (170 mi) before meeting the main Trans-Canada Highway (Highway 1) ten kilometres (6.2 mi) west of Portage la Prairie, where it ends its "Highway 16" designation. It then overlaps the TCH into Manitoba's capital and largest city, Winnipeg, as an unnumbered highway. Officially, the eastern end of the Yellowhead Highway is at the corner of Portage Avenue and Main Street in Downtown Winnipeg. The total length of the Yellowhead Highway, including ferries, is 2,960 kilometres (1,840 mi).

== History ==
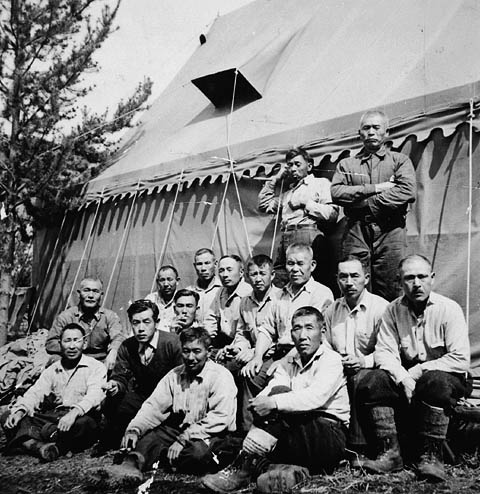
A road crew of interned Japanese Canadian men constructing a highway through the Yellowhead Pass in 1942 – later a namesake stretch of the Yellowhead Highway

The main Yellowhead Highway has been designated as Highway 16 for its entire length since 1977. Prior to this, only the Alberta and British Columbia portions of the highway were designated with this number. The Manitoba portion from the Trans-Canada Highway ten kilometres (6.2 mi) west of Portage la Prairie to the Saskatchewan border was designated as PTH 4 (redesignated PTH 16 in 1977), while the Saskatchewan portion (which was redesignated as Highway 16 in 1976) had two numbers designated. From the Manitoba border to Saskatoon, the highway was designated as Highway 14 while the portion from Saskatoon to Lloydminster and the Alberta border was designated as Highway 5. Prior to the opening of the Yellowhead Highway, Highways 5 and 14 both ran the width of Saskatchewan; the respective eastern and western portions of these highways retain their original designations. Prior to the highway retaining the number 16 designation, a very small section of the highway along Idylwyld Drive in Saskatoon was not designated with a number, as Highway 14 redirected on to 22 Street and Highway 5 would redirect on to Idylwyld Drive from 23 Street. Currently, the Yellowhead Highway remains unnumbered between PTH 16 and Winnipeg, although it shares the roadway with PTH 1.

While the beginnings of the Yellowhead Highway can be traced back to 1819 when Iroquois Metis Pierre Bostonais, nicknamed Tête Jaune/Yellow Head, was engaged by the Hudson's Bay Company to guide them westward through the Rocky Mountains, the impetus for the building of the highway began in 1921 when a group from Edmonton formed to advocate for a driveable road from Edmonton to Jasper.

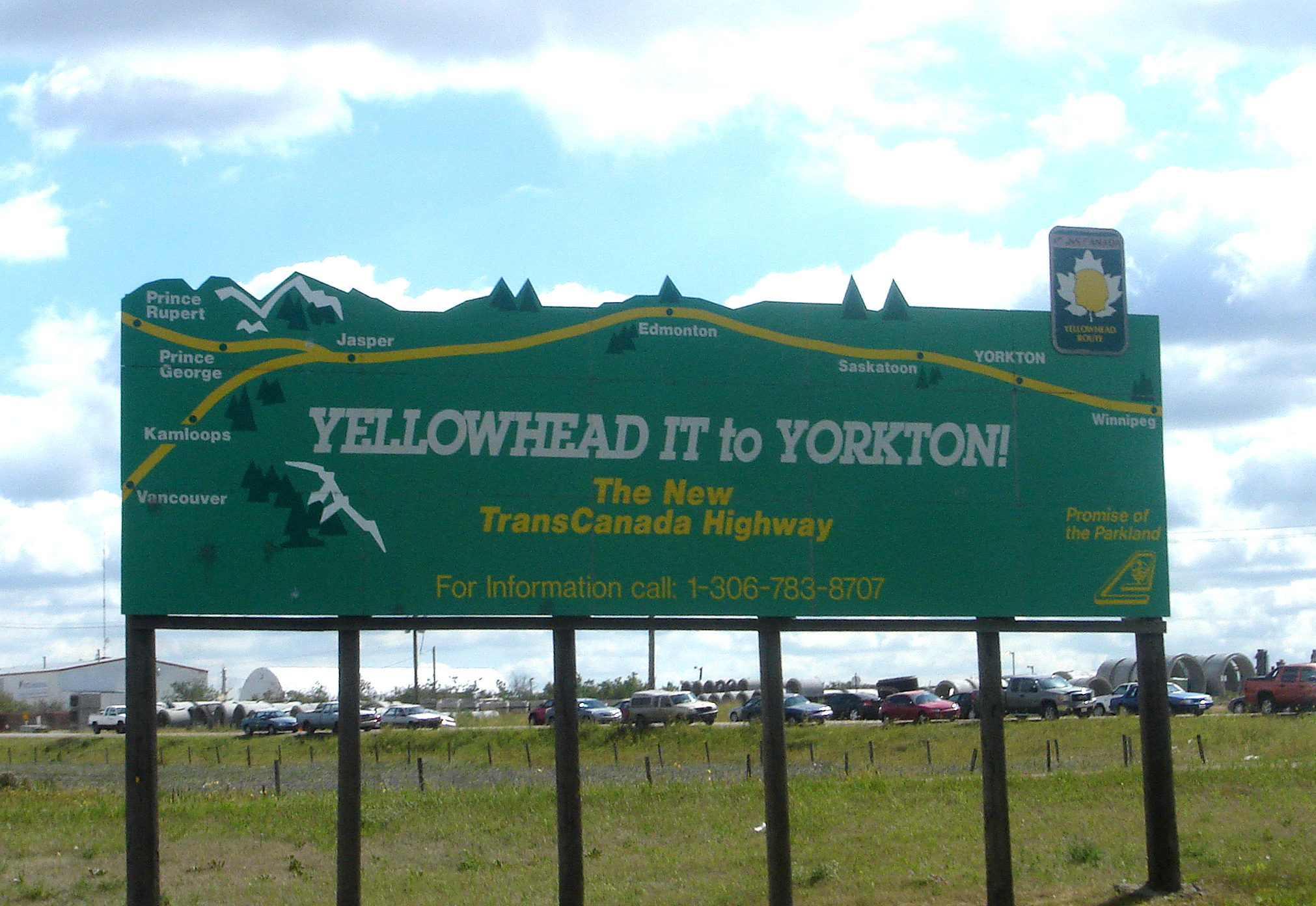
Yellowhead Highway sign

Much of the Yellowhead Highway between Edmonton and the BC Interior is built on former railway lines. In the early 1900s, both the Canadian Northern Railway (CNoR) and the Grand Trunk Pacific Railway (GTPR) built lines leading to the Yellowhead Pass. In 1917 the Canadian government compelled the two railways to share one line between Red Pass Junction and Lobstick, and portions of both railways were abandoned. Rails pulled from the abandoned sections were sent to France during the Great War. The CNoR was nationalized in 1918, and in 1919 the GTPR was nationalized as well. One of the engineers working on the crew that pulled up the rails was Fred Driscol. He had the idea to convert the rail bed into a road, and his proposal was endorsed by the Edmonton Automobile and Good Road Association (forerunner of today's Alberta Motor Association) and became that organization's main object of advocacy for the next fifteen years. Despite the E.A. & G.R.A.'s lobbying efforts the successor railway (the Canadian National) would not give up the right-of-way. Therefore, a different route to Jasper was assembled from old cart path, with the club paying for some sections to be built themselves. The E.A. & G.R.A. offered a $100 prize to the first motorists to reach Jasper from Edmonton. The prize was claimed by stunt driver Charley Neimeyer and mechanic Frank Silverthorne in an Overland in June 1922 just beating out George Gordon and J.E. Sims in a Ford by a few days. Both parties continued all the way to the coast and each also received a gold medal from the city of Victoria for being the first to reach that city by motorcar from across the Rockies, Neimeyer and Silverthorne though Washington State, and Gordon and Sims via the Fraser Canyon.

Work continued on the cart path upgrades with many sections also built on rail beds without formal permission from Canadian National. Finally, CN and the federal government agreed to a lease of the right-of-way backdated to 1923. In 1966, the provincial government received title to the entire stretch of abandoned rails. As of 1976, there were 114 kilometres (71 mi) of the Edmonton-to-Jasper section of the highway on former railway grades.

In 1936 the advocacy around the highway was formalized with the formation of the Yellowhead Highway Association which later, in 1947, was reformed as the Trans-Canada Highway System Association and a submission was made to Prime Minister Mackenzie King to advocate for the construction of the highway. The Association was renamed the Trans Canada Yellowhead Highway Association (TCYHA) in 2000 to better reflect its roots. The iconic Yellowhead Highway signage seen along the highways is trademarked to the TCYHA.

The Yellowhead Highway was officially opened in Western Canada in 1970; in 1978 all four Western Provinces agreed to use 16 for the highway. In 1986, the Yellowhead Highway received the designation of a Trans-Canada Highway with Highway 5 in BC, from Tête Jaune to Hope, remaining named just the Yellowhead Highway.

The Highway 5 in British Columbia used to be designated as part of the Yellowhead Highway only between Tête Jaune Cache and Kamloops, with Highway 5 south of Kamloops being signed with the standard BC highway shield. In the 2000s, route markers along the Coquihalla Highway were changed to reflect Yellowhead Highway 5.

== See also ==
- Numbered highways in Canada
- Highway of Tears murders
