= Alberta Highway 39 =

Highway in Alberta, Canada

Highway 39

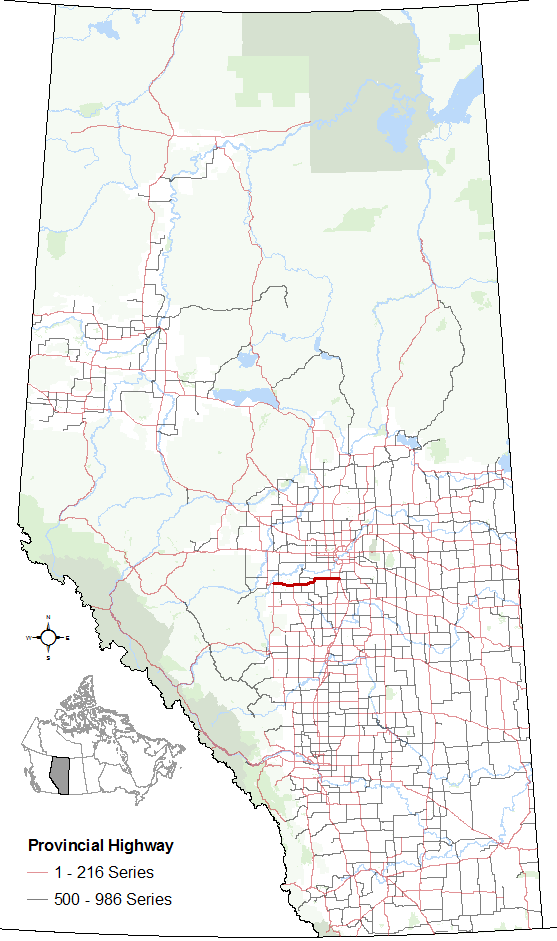

Route information
- Maintained by the Ministry of Transportation and Economic Corridors
- Length: 91.1 km (56.6 mi)

Major junctions
- West end: Highway 22 near Drayton Valley
- Highway 20 in Alsike; Highway 60 near Calmar
- East end: Highway 2 in Leduc

Location
- Country: Canada
- Province: Alberta
- Specialized and rural municipalities: Brazeau County, Leduc County
- Major cities: Leduc
- Towns: Calmar
- Villages: Warburg, Thorsby

Highway system
- Alberta Numbered Highway Network; List; Former
| ← Highway 38 | → Highway 40 |

Alberta Provincial Highway No. 39, commonly referred to as Highway 39, is an east–west highway in central Alberta, Canada. It extends from Highway 22, approximately 13 kilometres (8 mi) east of Drayton Valley, to Leduc where it ends at Highway 2. Highway 39 is about 91 kilometres (57 mi) long.

Highway 39 also connects with the communities of Breton, Warburg, Thorsby, and Calmar; while most of the small communities are now bypassed, Highway 39 still travels along Main Street in Calmar.

== History ==
Highway 39 was originally constructed as a link between Leduc and Breton, where it ended at Highway 12 (now Highway 20). In 1955, a ferry across the North Saskatchewan River started operations southeast of Drayton Valley, resulting in Highway 57 following present-day Highway 616 to Breton. It proved to be short-lived as in 1957, the Highway 57 was realigned across a new bridge, terminating with Highway 39 in Alsike. In the 1960s, a 9 km (6 mi) section of Highway 39 between Breton and Alsike was renumbered to Highway 12, resulting in Highways 12, 39, and 57 once again terminating at a common point, this time in Alsike. In 1980, the Highway 22 designation was extended north, which included a 56 km (35 mi) section of Highway 57 being renumbered; the remaining 27 km (17 mi) section of Highway 57 became part of Highway 39.

== Major intersections ==
From west to east:

| Rural/specialized municipality | Location | km | mi | Destinations | Notes |
|---|---|---|---|---|---|
| Brazeau County | | 0.0 | 0.0 | Highway 22 – Drayton Valley, Rocky Mountain House | Highway 39 western terminus; continues as Highway 22 north; former Highway 57 west |
| Brazeau County | | 4.9 | 3.0 | Highway 759 north – Berrymoor, Tomahawk | |
| Brazeau County | Alsike | 26.9 | 16.7 | Highway 20 south – Breton, Winfield | Former Highway 12 south / Highway 57 eastern terminus |
| Leduc County | | 35.1 | 21.8 | Highway 770 north – St. Francis, Genesee | West end of Highway 770 concurrency |
| Leduc County | Warburg | 36.7 | 22.8 | Highway 770 south (50 Street) | East end of Highway 770 concurrency |
| Leduc County | Sunnybrook | 44.9 | 27.9 | Range Road 22 | |
| Leduc County | Thorsby | 56.1 | 34.9 | Highway 778 south – Pigeon Lake | |
| Leduc County | | 59.3 | 36.8 | Highway 622 west – Telfordville, St. Francis | |
| Leduc County | | 66.9 | 41.6 | Range Road 275 – Buford | |
| Leduc County | Calmar | 75.0 | 46.6 | Highway 795 south (50 Street) – Pipestone | |
| Leduc County | | 79.9 | 49.6 | Highway 60 north / Range Road 263 south – Devon | Roundabout |
| City of Leduc | | 91.1 | 56.6 | Highway 2 – Edmonton, Red Deer, Calgary | Interchange; Highway 2 exit 517; Highway 39 eastern terminus; access to Edmonton International Airport |
| City of Leduc | | 91.9 | 57.1 | 50 Street | To Highway 2A south / Highway 623 east |
1.000 mi = 1.609 km; 1.000 km = 0.621 mi: Closed/former; Concurrency terminus
