= Port Alberta =

Location
- Country: Canada
- Location: Edmonton Metropolitan Region, Alberta

Statistics
- Website "Port Alberta".

Port Alberta is a joint venture between Edmonton Global and Edmonton International Airport (EIA) based in the Edmonton Metropolitan Region in Alberta, Canada. Port Alberta provides transportation, logistics and supply chain solutions to connect Alberta's economy to worldwide markets. Its office is located in Edmonton.

An independent advisory board representing regional businesses led by two co-chairs and a project manager provides leadership and direction to the Port Alberta network.

== Network ==
Port Alberta's network comprises

- roads, rail, runways and marine;
- a foreign trade zone;
- innovation technology;
- professional services;
- logistics and manufacturing facilities; and
- the Edmonton International Trade Program.

== Foreign Trade Zone ==
Port Alberta’s Foreign Trade Zone (FTZ) enables companies involved in handling or moving goods to reduce and eliminate normal trade barriers, such as tariffs, quotas and compliance costs. Within the FTZ, located at the EIA, a company imports raw materials or partially finished goods, completes manufacturing and exports the products throughout Canada, North America or internationally.

== History ==
=== Pre–2010 ===
Port Alberta was inspired by the Port of Houston, a one-stop shop for customs and security with a free trade zone and with air, rail and trucking connections in one place. In 2007, Edmonton Airports, the EEDC, and the Edmonton Chamber of Commerce signed a memorandum of understanding to create an inland port at the EIA. The federal government provided C$1.5 million in funding to the Port Alberta inland trade and transportation hub project.

=== 2010–2014 ===
Logo of the industry-led Port Alberta from 2010 through 2014

In 2010, Port Alberta transitioned to an industry-led association from its government-based founders and a board of independent industry directors was established in November 2010. Port Alberta incorporated as a legal entity on December 2, 2012, independent of the EIA and was represented by an industry and government led board that acted as a single point of entry for a multipurpose community port system of inland ports connecting Alberta with the Port of Prince Rupert and the Port Metro Vancouver.

Port Alberta members integrate various Canadian inland transportation hubs such as CentrePort Canada and the Global Transportation Hub while connecting the CANAMEX Corridor with the Asia Pacific Gateway, and Canada's Arctic and Northwest Territories. Port Alberta's location on the CANAMEX Corridor, established by the North American Free Trade Agreement, combined with proximity to Alberta's Industrial Heartland, and the Nisku Business Park places Port Alberta at the economic centre of Canada's energy industry.

Port Alberta's geographical positioning and collaborative relationships extend business access to foreign trade zone benefits and a network of highways, railways, air and sea connections to important regional and international markets, including Eastern Canada, Western Canada, the Canadian Arctic, the United States, Europe, Asia, and the rapidly expanding Mexican and Latin American markets. Port Alberta represents a multi-point inland port capacity exceeding 500,000 twenty-foot equivalent units (TEUs) in 2013 with expansion in 2014 to approximately 800,000 TEUs.

Port Alberta's board of directors during this timeframe consisted of private sector and government members representing Canadian National (CN), Canadian Pacific (CP), Edmonton Airports, Momentive, Stantec, Graham Construction, the City of Edmonton, PCL Construction, the City of Leduc, Symmetry, Inc., ONPA Architects, and Waiward Steel. The chair of the board was Daryl Procinsky of ONPA Architects, while its last chief executive officer (CEO) was Gordon Groat, formerly of Intuit Inc. Global Business Division, the CKUA Radio Network Board of Directors, and the Town of Devon.

Partnerships included BBEX/Braden Burry Expediting Ltd., CN, CP, Clark Builders, Deloitte, the City of Edmonton, Edmonton Airports, the EEDC, the Government of Alberta, the City of Leduc, Leduc County, the Leduc-Nisku Economic Development Association, Momentive Specialty Chemicals Canada Inc., the Oil Sands Developers Group (now the Oilsands Community Alliance), ONPA Architects, Stuart Olson Dominions, Trans America Group, Trans Port International Corporation, Waiward Steel, and Western Economic Diversification Canada.

=== 2015–present ===
In 2015, Port Alberta was restarted through the EEDC and the Edmonton International Airport Authority as a joint venture.

When EEDC was shut down in 2020, responsibility for managing Port Alberta was shifted to Edmonton Global, the region's FDI and international trade company. A reimagined and reinvigorated Port Alberta was launched on March 24, 2022.

== See also ==
- Acheson Industrial Area
- Athabasca oil sands
- Cold Lake oil sands
- Edmonton Metropolitan Region Board
- Refinery Row
- Wabasco oil sands
