= Genesee, Alberta =

Genesee
- Unincorporated community
- Location within Alberta
- Coordinates: 53°20′45″N 114°22′12″W
- Country: Canada
- Province: Alberta
- Region: Central Alberta
- Census Division: 11
- Municipal district: Leduc County
- Established: 1905
- Elevation: 820 m (2,690 ft)
- Time zone: UTC-7 (MST)
- Highways: 770
- Waterways: North Saskatchewan River

Genesee is an unincorporated community in central Alberta, Canada within Leduc County. The community was named after Genesee, New York, the native home of a first settler.

== Geography ==
Genesee is located off Highway 770 south of the North Saskatchewan River, approximately 71 km (44 mi) southwest of the City of Edmonton. Highway 622 and St. Francis are located 8 km (5.0 mi) to the south. The Capital Power Genesee Generating Station is considered the centre of the community.

=== Climate ===
Genesee, like Edmonton, has a northern continental climate with extreme seasonal temperatures, although the city has milder winters than either Regina or Winnipeg, which are both located at a more southerly latitude. It has mild summers and chilly winters, with the average daily temperatures ranging from -11.7 °C (10.9 °F) in January to 17.5 °C (63.5 °F) in July. Annually, temperatures exceed 30 °C (86 °F) on an average of three days and fall below −20 °C (−4 °F) on an average of twenty-eight days. The highest temperature recorded in Edmonton was 37.2 °C (99.0 °F) on June 29, 1937.

== Economy ==
Genesee's main source of employment is the Capital Power generating station. These natural gas fueled plants employ about 75 people over the three generating units. The balance of community employment is divided between agrarian activities and residents who commute to larger centres for employment.

== Infrastructure ==
=== Airports ===
Genesee is served by the Edmonton International Airport, but local grass fields abound. The closest are the Zajes airfield on Highway 770, 5 km (3.1 mi) north of Highway 39, and the St Francis Airfield (Byrne Farm), 8 km (5.0 mi) west of St Francis on Highway 622.

=== Transportation ===
Genesee is served by one paved road – Highway 770. The remaining roads are gravel topped roads averaging 20 feet (6.1 m) in width. Leduc County maintains these roads with periodic grading and gravel resurfacing. Residents are offered oiling options for the immediate area in front of their houses for dust management.

=== Electricity and water distribution systems ===
Electricity is provided by local utility companies post deregulation. Prior to deregulation, TransAlta Utilities was the only provider. Electricity is extended via overhead power lines and you do have to rent your transformer.

Water and wastewater are traditional drilled well/cistern setups and septic fields/mounds. Water quality in the area was exceptional; however, recent strip mining in the area has led to some degradation of the shallow wells in the area.

=== Hospitals and emergency services ===
There are four main hospitals serving Genesee: the Breton hospital, the Drayton Valley hospital, the Westview hospital in Stony Plain, and the Leduc hospital. Additional facilities and more advanced care is available in Edmonton's various hospital facilities.

Emergency services are provided by county options; however, the residents of Genesee are further covered by the emergency services within Capital Power's Genesee Generating Station's facility. These include fire and first responder emergency services.

== Education ==
=== K-12 ===
There is only one public school for the Genesee area, located in the Village of Warburg. It offers playschool through grade 12 education in both matriculation and vocational streams.

Genesee has a unique school history, dating from a one-room schoolhouse that existed until 1960, to the former community hall (kindergarten and grade 1 only) that was closed when the generation station's cooling pond flooded the south side of the community in 1985. All schooling operations were consolidated in Warburg.

== Culture ==
=== Nightlife ===
Most residents need to drive to nearby towns of Stony Plain/Spruce Grove and Leduc for major clubs and movies, but local rural bars do abound in Warburg, Sunnybrook, Breton, Mink Lake, Wabamun and Beach Corner. Other activities center around local neighbours arranging evening activities. Like most rural areas, informal "bush parties" are commonplace.

=== Museums and galleries ===
The local history is contained within the Warburg Museum, a converted two-room schoolhouse on the grounds of the current Warburg School facilities.

=== Local festivals and activities ===
- Genesee Sting Slo-Pitch team
- 4-H activities

== Sports and recreation ==
Located between Stony Plain/Spruce Grove and Warburg, Genesee residents utilize the services of these communities. Warburg provides hockey and curling facilities as well as any organized sports for baseball and court sports out of the local high school. The Stony Plain/Spruce Grove area offers access to the same breadth of offerings, but adds the Tri-Leisure Centre for aquatic sports as well as many fitness facilities.

The local Genesee community hall has facilities for baseball, slo-pitch, horseshoes, and a playground. The outdoor arena has since been decommissioned and moved to the Warburg School.

== Religion ==
Genesee had a United Church assembly throughout the 1970s and 1980s. Catholic services were held in St. Francis until that parish was closed and the congregation moved to Warburg.
