= Carnwood, Alberta =

Unincorporated community in Alberta, Canada

Coordinates: 53°11′24″N 114°38′06″W

Location of Carnwood Alberta

Carnwood is an unincorporated community in central Alberta in Brazeau County, located on Highway 39, 72 kilometres (45 mi) west of Leduc. The first school was built in 1920. The community takes its name from Cornwood, in England.
