= Buford, Alberta =

Buford
- Hamlet
- Location of Buford Buford (Canada)
- Coordinates: 53°14′51″N 113°55′52″W
- Country: Canada
- Province: Alberta
- Region: Edmonton Metropolitan Region
- Census division: 11
- Municipal district: Leduc County

Government
  - Type: Unincorporated
  - Governing body: Leduc County Council

Area (2021)
  - Land: 2.61 km^{2} (1.01 sq mi)

Population (2021)
  - Total: 33
  - Density: 12.7/km^{2} (33/sq mi)
- Time zone: UTC−06:00 (Alberta Time)
- Area codes: 780, 587, 825

Buford is a hamlet in central Alberta, Canada within Leduc County. It is located 2 kilometres (1.2 mi) south of Highway 39, 23 kilometres (14 mi) west of Leduc.

The hamlet takes its name from Buford, North Dakota.

== Demographics ==
In the 2021 Census of Population conducted by Statistics Canada, Buford had a population of 33 living in 12 of its 12 total private dwellings, a change of −29.8% from its 2016 population of 47. With a land area of 2.61 km^{2} (1.01 sq mi), it had a population density of 12.6/km^{2} (32.7/sq mi) in 2021.

As a designated place in the 2016 Census of Population conducted by Statistics Canada, Buford had a population of 47 living in 18 of its 18 total private dwellings, a change of 67.9% from its 2011 population of 28. With a land area of 2.61 km^{2} (1.01 sq mi), it had a population density of 18.0/km^{2} (46.6/sq mi) in 2016.

== See also ==
- List of communities in Alberta
- List of hamlets in Alberta
