= Rolly View =

- Hamlet
- Location of Rolly View Rolly View (Canada)
- Coordinates: 53°15′10″N 113°19′01″W
- Country: Canada
- Province: Alberta
- Region: Edmonton Metropolitan Region
- Census division: 11
- Municipal district: Leduc County

Government
  - Type: Unincorporated
  - Governing body: Leduc County Council

Area (2021)
  - Land: 0.71 km^{2} (0.27 sq mi)

Population (2021)
  - Total: 71
  - Density: 100.2/km^{2} (260/sq mi)
- Time zone: UTC−06:00 (Alberta Time)
- Area codes: 780, 587, 825

Rolly View is a hamlet in Central Alberta, Canada, within Leduc County. It is located approximately 11 kilometres (6.8 mi) west of Highway 21 and 16 kilometres (9.9 mi) east of Leduc on Highway 623 (Rolly View Road) at Range Road 234.

== Demographics ==
In the 2021 Census of Population conducted by Statistics Canada, Rolly View had a population of 71 living in 27 of its 28 total private dwellings, a change of 0% from its 2016 population of 71. With a land area of 0.71 km^{2} (0.27 sq mi), it had a population density of 100.0/km^{2} (259.0/sq mi) in 2021.

As a designated place in the 2016 Census of Population conducted by Statistics Canada, Rolly View had a population of 71 living in 29 of its 30 total private dwellings, a change of −20.2% from its 2011 population of 89. With a land area of 0.71 km^{2} (0.27 sq mi), it had a population density of 100.0/km^{2} (259.0/sq mi) in 2016.

== Religious assemblies ==
- St. Paul's Lutheran Church (established in 1896)

== See also ==
- List of communities in Alberta
- List of hamlets in Alberta
