= Wizard Lake =

Lake in Alberta, Canada

- Location within Alberta
- Location: Leduc County, Alberta
- Coordinates: 53°06′41″N 113°53′42″W
- Type: Eutrophic
- Primary outflows: Conjuring Creek
- Catchment area: 29.8 km^{2} (11.5 sq mi)
- Basin countries: Canada
- Max. length: 11.3 km (7.0 mi)
- Max. width: 0.5 km (0.31 mi)
- Surface area: 2.48 km^{2} (0.96 sq mi)
- Average depth: 6.2 m (20 ft)
- Max. depth: 11.0 m (36.1 ft)
- Residence time: 14 years
- Surface elevation: 789 m (2,589 ft)
- References: Atlas of Alberta Lakes

Wizard Lake is a lake in Alberta, Canada located 17 km (11 mi) south of Calmar. It is a popular recreation spot due to its proximity to Edmonton.

== Geography ==
Wizard Lake is a relatively small lake. The bottom is mostly rock and has a shallow depth with the average being only 6.2 m (20 ft). "The Point" is a nickname for the narrowest and most sandy part of the lake which is a good swimming spot.

== Amenities ==
Wizard Lake is home to Jubilee Campground which has 100 stalls (33 power, 67 Natural) in total. The lake has recently been refitted on the east shore for a public swimming location.

=== Activities ===
- Swimming
- Fishing
- Boating
- Camping
- Snowmobiling

== See also ==
- List of lakes of Alberta
