= Leduc-Nisku Economic Development Association =

Coordinates: 53.273°N 113.550°W

- Formation: 1984
- Dissolved: December 31, 2019
- Location: Leduc, Alberta, Canada
- Region served: City of Leduc, Leduc County, the Towns of Beaumont, Calmar Devon and Thorsby and the Village of Warburg

The Leduc-Nisku Economic Development Association (EDA) was an economic development partnership founded in 1984. It marketed Alberta's International Region, and became dissolved at the end of 2019.

The partnership included the founding members of Leduc County and the City of Leduc, as well as the nearby communities of Beaumont, Calmar, Devon, Thorsby and Warburg.

== History ==
The Leduc-Nisku EDA was founded by Leduc County and the City of Leduc in 1984. In 1999, the Leduc-Nisku EDA evolved into Alberta's International Region by expanding the partnership to include Beaumont, Calmar, Devon, Thorsby and Warburg. The EDA dissolved at the end of 2019.

== Board ==
The Leduc-Nisku EDA's board of directors consisted of 11 members, and two alternates. The board consisted of a chair, elected officials and alternates from Leduc County and the City of Leduc, and members-at-large.

== Alberta's International Region ==
Alberta's International Region
- Formation: 1999
- Location: Leduc, Alberta, Canada
- Region served: Leduc County, Alberta
- Website: www.internationalregion.com

Alberta's International Region is an economic region effectively within the boundaries of Leduc County, including the City of Leduc. It is a major industrial hub located 20 kilometres south of Edmonton, Alberta’s capital city. Home to the largest developed energy services industrial park in Canada, three of the world’s top five oil services multinationals operate facilities within the region. The strategic location provides one of the most comprehensive and efficient multi-modal distribution systems in North America. Key sectors in the region include transportation and logistics, advanced manufacturing, energy services, and agri-foods processing.

Alberta’s International Region is an ideal place to locate a business due to its thriving economic environment, competitive tax regime, skilled workforce, and market access. The high quality of life, big city amenities and recreation opportunities here make Alberta’s International Region a great place to live and raise a family.

Alberta’s International Region was rated one of the top 25 places to do business in Western Canada (Alberta Venture, 2012) and as a Great Community for Business in Alberta (Alberta Venture, 2014).

=== Industry ===
Major industry sectors present within Alberta's International Region include agriculture, energy, environment, manufacturing and transportation. Major industrial parks within the region include Nisku Business Park within Leduc County and the Leduc Business Park within the City of Leduc. Both are located on the east side of the Queen Elizabeth II Highway (Highway 2) across from the Edmonton International Airport.

=== Transportation ===
Alberta's International Region has access to air, rail and highway transportation. The Edmonton International Airport is located in Leduc County, adjacent to the City of Leduc, on the west side of the Queen Elizabeth II Highway. The Queen Elizabeth II Highway, also known as Highway 2, forms part of Alberta's portion of the CANAMEX Corridor, which is a transportation corridor linking Canada, the United States and Mexico established under the North American Free Trade Agreement to foster trade, tourism and economic activity. A Canadian Pacific (CP) main line, which connects Edmonton and Calgary, runs through both the Nisku Business Park and Leduc Business Park.

=== Activities ===
Promoted by the Leduc-Nisku EDA, Alberta's International Region hosts regular economic partnership breakfasts and other special events.

== See also ==
- Acheson Industrial Area
- Alberta's Industrial Heartland
- Edmonton International Airport
- Edmonton Metropolitan Region
- Edmonton Metropolitan Region Board
- Nisku Business Park
- Port Alberta
- Refinery Row
