= Alberta Highway 57 =

Highway in Alberta, Canada

Route information
- Length: 82 km (51 mi)
- Existed: 1950s–1979

Major junctions
- South end: Highway 39 in Alsike
- North end: Highway 16 (TCH) in Entwistle

Location
- Country: Canada
- Province: Alberta
- Specialized and rural municipalities: Brazeau, Parkland
- Towns: Drayton Valley

Highway system
- Alberta Provincial Highway Network; List; Former
← Highway 56	→ Highway 58

Alberta Provincial Highway No. 57, commonly referred to as Highway 57, was a highway in central Alberta, Canada that served the Town of Drayton Valley and existed between the 1950s and 1979. It is now part of Highway 22 and Highway 39.

== History ==
Highway 57 originally was a north–south gravel highway that linked Drayton Valley to Highway 16 in Entwistle. In the mid-1950s, spurred on by increased oil activity, Highway 57 was extended from Drayton Valley eastward across the North Saskatchewan River. In 1955, a ferry that started operations and travelled east to the Village of Breton, terminating Highway 39. In 1957, the highway was realigned across a new bridge and terminated at Hamlet of Alsike, 9 km (6 mi) north of Breton. In the 1970s, work was being done to establish a north-south highway west of Highway 2, as at the time Highway 22 terminated at Cremona, 40 km (25 mi) north of Cochrane. In 1980, the Highway 22 designation was extended north, which included a 56 km (35 mi) section of Highway 57 being renumbered; the remaining 27 km (17 mi) section of Highway 57 became part of Highway 39.
