= East Vistas, Alberta =

East Vistas
- Locality
- Location within Alberta
- Coordinates: 53.35°N 113.48°W
- Country: Canada
- Province: Alberta
- Region: Edmonton Region
- Census division: 11
- Municipal district: Leduc County
- Approved: September 28, 2010

Government
  - Type: Unincorporated
  - Mayor: Tanni Doblanko
  - Governing body: Leduc County Council: Glenn Belozer; Tanni Doblanko; Kelly-Lynn Lewis; Raymond Scobie; Rick Smith; Kelly Vandenberghe; Larry Wanchuk

Area (2021)
  - Land: 5.72 km^{2} (2.21 sq mi)

Population (2021)
  - Total: 660
  - Density: 115.3/km^{2} (299/sq mi)
- Time zone: UTC−06:00 (Alberta Time)
- Area code: +1-780
- Highways: 625
- Website: Leduc County

East Vistas is an unincorporated community in central Alberta, Canada within Leduc County. It is located on the north side of Highway 625, 1.6 km (0.99 mi) west of Beaumont, 3.6 km (2.2 mi) northeast of Leduc, 3.2 km (2.0 mi) south of Edmonton, and 0.8 km (0.50 mi) east of the Nisku Industrial Business Park.

== History ==
Approved by Leduc County Council on September 28, 2010, East Vistas will be an urban community with a population of approximately 22,549 people at full build-out. It currently consists of two existing residential subdivisions – Lukas Estates (formerly Lukas Estates I), an estate residential subdivision, and Diamond Estates (formerly Lukas Estates II), a large lot urban subdivision.

The approval of East Vistas has provided Leduc County the opportunity to develop its own large urban community, similar to how Strathcona County has Sherwood Park.

== Geography ==
More specifically, East Vistas includes all lands bound by Highway 625 to the south, Range Road 244 to the east, Township Road 510 to the north, and Range Road 245 to the west. It also includes lands on the west side of Range Road 245 between The Vistas country residential subdivisions to the south and Irvine Creek and Township Road 510 to the north.

== Demographics ==
In the 2021 Census of Population conducted by Statistics Canada, East Vistas had a population of 660 living in 158 of its 163 total private dwellings, a change of 4300% from its 2016 population of 15. With a land area of 5.72 km^{2} (2.21 sq mi), it had a population density of 115.4/km^{2} (298.8/sq mi) in 2021.

== See also ==
- Bremner, Alberta, a future urban community in Strathcona County endorsed in 2016
