= Bremner, Alberta =

Bremner
- Locality
- Location within Alberta
- Coordinates: 53.585°N 113.197°W
- Country: Canada
- Province: Alberta
- Region: Edmonton Metropolitan Region
- Census division: 11
- Specialized municipality: Strathcona County
- Endorsed: March 22, 2016

Government
  - Type: Unincorporated
  - Mayor: Rod Frank
  - Governing body: Strathcona County Council: Dave Anderson; Katie Berghofer; Brian Botterill; Linton Delainey; Glen Lawrence; Robert Parks; Paul Smith; Bill Tonita
- Time zone: UTC−06:00 (Alberta Time)
- Area codes: 780, 587, 825
- Highways: 16, 21, 824
- Website: Strathcona County

Bremner is a future urban community in central Alberta, Canada within Strathcona County. It is located on the north side of Highway 16 (Yellowhead Highway) and the east side of Highway 21, adjacent to the northeast corner of Sherwood Park. Its geographic centre is approximately 25 km (16 mi) east of downtown Edmonton, 14 km (8.7 mi) south of Fort Saskatchewan and 7 km (4.3 mi) northwest of Ardrossan.

The planned boundaries of Bremner are Highway 21 to the west, Highway 16 to the south, Range Road 222 to the east (which becomes Highway 824 south of Highway 16) and Pointe-Aux-Pins Creek to the north.

Endorsed by Strathcona County Council over Colchester as its next future urban community on March 22, 2016, Bremner is estimated to house 54,000 residents and provide 9,800 jobs at full build-out, which is anticipated to occur in 2054. Additional lands north of Pointe-Aux-Pins Creek and south of Township Road 540 present an opportunity for further expansion of Bremner in the long-term.

The endorsement of Bremner as Strathcona County's next urban growth node enables more detailed planning to be undertaken in advance of subdivision and development as adjacent Sherwood Park to the west and southwest continues to build-out. Full build-out of Sherwood Park is anticipated by 2026.

== See also ==
- East Vistas, Alberta, a new urban community in Leduc County approved in 2010
