= Telfordville =

- Hamlet
- Location of Telfordville Telfordville (Canada)
- Coordinates: 53°16′24″N 114°10′14″W
- Country: Canada
- Province: Alberta
- Region: Edmonton Metropolitan Region
- Census division: 11
- Municipal district: Leduc County

Government
  - Type: Unincorporated
  - Governing body: Leduc County Council

Area (2021)
  - Land: 0.4 km^{2} (0.15 sq mi)

Population (2021)
  - Total: 35
  - Density: 86.7/km^{2} (225/sq mi)
- Time zone: UTC−06:00 (Alberta Time)
- Area codes: 780, 587, 825

Telfordville is a hamlet in central Alberta, Canada within Leduc County. It is located just off Highway 622, approximately 41 kilometres (25 mi) west of Leduc. It is named for Robert Telford, former Leduc mayor and member of the Legislative Assembly of Alberta.

== Demographics ==
In the 2021 Census of Population conducted by Statistics Canada, Telfordville had a population of 35 living in 13 of its 16 total private dwellings, a change of 75% from its 2016 population of 20. With a land area of 0.4 km^{2} (0.15 sq mi), it had a population density of 87.5/km^{2} (226.6/sq mi) in 2021.

As a designated place in the 2016 Census of Population conducted by Statistics Canada, Telfordville had a population of 20 living in 11 of its 15 total private dwellings, compared to its 2011 population of 0. With a land area of 0.41 km^{2} (0.16 sq mi), it had a population density of 48.8/km^{2} (126.3/sq mi) in 2016.

== See also ==
- List of communities in Alberta
- List of hamlets in Alberta
