= CJLD-FM =

Radio station in Leduc, Alberta, Canada

- Leduc, Alberta; Canada
- Broadcast area: Leduc County
- Frequency: 93.1 MHz
- Branding: 93.1 The One

Programming
- Format: Country

Ownership
- Owner: Blackgold Broadcasting Inc.

History
- First air date: April 16, 2013

Technical information
- Licensing authority: CRTC
- Facility ID: 9499
- Class: A
- Power: 3,200 watts
- HAAT: 57.5 metres (189 ft)
- Transmitter coordinates: 53°18′28.1″N 113°30′14.4″W

Links
- Webcast: Listen live
- Website: onefm.ca/leduc/

CJLD-FM (93.1 FM, "93.1 The One") is a country formatted radio station licensed to Leduc, Alberta, Canada, serving Leduc County. CJLD is owned by Mark Tamagi and operated by Blackgold Broadcasting Inc.

== History ==
On February 22, 2012, the Canadian Radio-television and Telecommunications Commission (CRTC) approved an application for Mark Tamagi, on behalf of Blackgold Broadcasting Inc., to operate a new English language FM radio station in Leduc.

At 9:31am, on April 16, 2013, 93.1 The One officially launched with "Roughest Neck Around" by Corb Lund and the Hurtin' Albertans as the station's first song.

== Programming ==
The station's programming schedule consists of Shane Michaels, John Tesh and Seanna Collins. The nationally syndicated Intelligence for Your Life with John Tesh and The Hit List with Fitz round out the schedule.
