= Thorsby, Alberta =

Thorsby
- Town
- Town of Thorsby
- Location of Thorsby in Alberta
- Coordinates: 53°13′39″N 114°03′2″W
- Country: Canada
- Province: Alberta
- Region: Edmonton Metropolitan Region
- Municipal district: Leduc County
- Incorporated
  - Village: December 31, 1949
  - Town: January 1, 2017

Government
  - Mayor: Jeremiah Jones
  - Governing body: Thorsby Town Council

Area (2021)
  - Land: 3.8 km^{2} (1.5 sq mi)
- Elevation: 745 m (2,444 ft)

Population (2021)
  - Total: 976
  - Density: 254.6/km^{2} (659/sq mi)
- Time zone: UTC−06:00 (Alberta Time)
- Highways: 39; 778
- Waterways: Weed Creek
- Website: Official website

Thorsby is a town in central Alberta, Canada. It is approximately 38 km (24 mi) west of the Leduc on Highway 39. Pigeon Lake and Pigeon Lake Provincial Park are located 20 km (12 mi) south of the community.

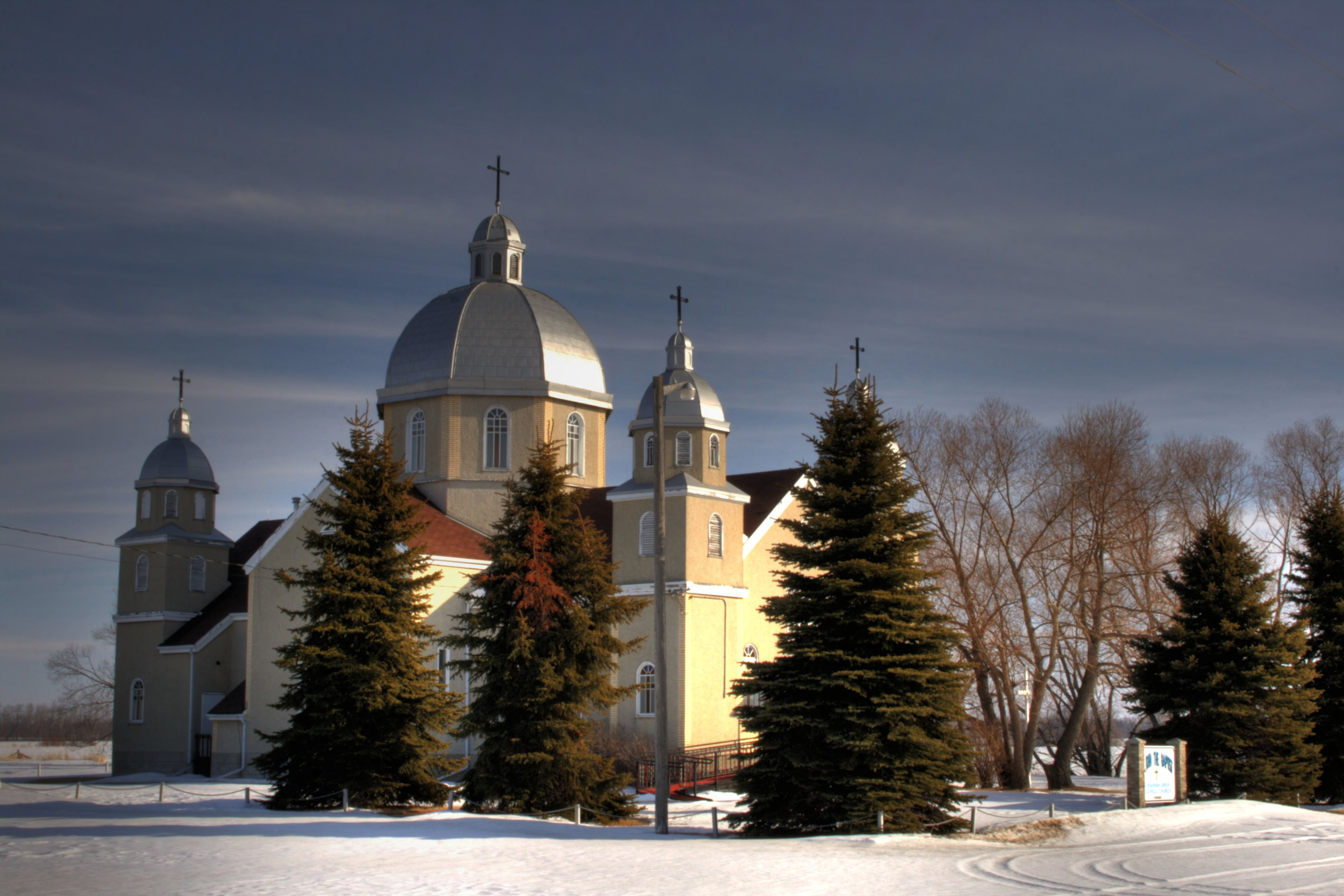
St. John the Baptist Ukrainian Catholic Church, at the south end of Thorsby

== Demographics ==
In the 2021 Census of Population conducted by Statistics Canada, the Town of Thorsby had a population of 967 living in 405 of its 442 total private dwellings, a change of −1.8% from its 2016 population of 985. With a land area of 3.8 km^{2} (1.5 sq mi), it had a population density of 254.5/km^{2} (659.1/sq mi) in 2021.

The population of the Town of Thorsby according to its 2017 municipal census is 1,015, a change of −1% from its 2015 municipal census population of 1,025.

In the 2016 Census of Population conducted by Statistics Canada, the Town of Thorsby recorded a population of 985 living in 394 of its 428 total private dwellings, a 3.6% change from its 2011 population of 951. With a land area of 3.85 km^{2} (1.49 sq mi), it had a population density of 255.8/km^{2} (662.6/sq mi) in 2016.

== Economy ==
The Town of Thorsby is a member of the Leduc-Nisku Economic Development Association, an economic development partnership that markets Alberta's International Region in proximity to the Edmonton International Airport.

== See also ==
- List of communities in Alberta
- List of towns in Alberta
- Rundle's Mission
