= Sunnybrook, Alberta =

Sunnybrook
- Hamlet
- Location of Sunnybrook Sunnybrook (Canada)
- Coordinates: 53°11′38″N 114°13′53″W
- Country: Canada
- Province: Alberta
- Region: Edmonton Metropolitan Region
- Census division: 11
- Municipal district: Leduc County

Government
  - Type: Unincorporated
  - Governing body: Leduc County Council

Area (2021)
  - Land: 0.31 km^{2} (0.12 sq mi)

Population (2021)
  - Total: 50
  - Density: 160.4/km^{2} (415/sq mi)
- Time zone: UTC−06:00 (Alberta Time)
- Area codes: 780, 587, 825

Sunnybrook is a hamlet in central Alberta, Canada within Leduc County. It is located on Highway 39, approximately 43 kilometres (27 mi) west of Leduc.

== Demographics ==
Population history of Sunnybrook
Year	Pop.	±%
1941	49	—
1951	70	+42.9%
1956	66	−5.7%
1961	49	−25.8%
1966	52	+6.1%
1971	56	+7.7%
1976	50	−10.7%
1981	61	+22.0%
1986	55	−9.8%
1991	51	−7.3%
2011	59	+15.7%
2016	59	+0.0%
2021	50	−15.3%
Source: Statistics Canada

In the 2021 Census of Population conducted by Statistics Canada, Sunnybrook had a population of 50 living in 22 of its 25 total private dwellings, a change of −15.3% from its 2016 population of 59. With a land area of 0.31 km^{2} (0.12 sq mi), it had a population density of 161.3/km^{2} (417.7/sq mi) in 2021.

As a designated place in the 2016 Census of Population conducted by Statistics Canada, Sunnybrook had a population of 59 living in 24 of its 26 total private dwellings, a change of 0% from its 2011 population of 59. With a land area of 0.31 km^{2} (0.12 sq mi), it had a population density of 190.3/km^{2} (492.9/sq mi) in 2016.

== See also ==
- List of communities in Alberta
- List of hamlets in Alberta
