= Brazeau County =

Municipal district in Alberta, Canada

- Municipal district
- Logo

- Location within Alberta
- Coordinates: 53°13′20″N 114°58′37″W
- Country: Canada
- Province: Alberta
- Region: Central Alberta
- Census division: 11
- Improvement district: December 31, 1987
- Municipal district: July 1, 1988
- Name change: October 1, 2002

Government
  - Reeve: Reeve removed from office. By election set for Nov 2-2026
  - Governing body: Brazeau County Council
  - CAO: Rudy Friesen CAO
  - Administrative office: north of Drayton Valley

Area (2021)
  - Land: 3,000.14 km^{2} (1,158.36 sq mi)

Population (2021)
  - Total: 7,179
  - Density: 2.4/km^{2} (6.2/sq mi)
- Time zone: UTC−06:00 (Alberta Time)
- Website: brazeau.ab.ca

Brazeau County is a municipal district in central Alberta, Canada. It is located in Census Division 11. The municipal district was incorporated on July 1, 1988 from Improvement District No. 222. On October 1, 2002, the name was changed from Municipal District of Brazeau No. 77 to Brazeau County.

It is named for the Brazeau River, in turn named for Joseph Brazeau, a linguist associated with the Palliser Expedition.

== History ==
Brazeau County encompasses an area that was originally under the jurisdiction of three neighbouring municipalities. In the mid-1980s, residents of the southwest portion of Parkland County and the west portion of Leduc County were growing weary of perceived poor service provision as a result of being located significant distances from their municipal headquarters in Stony Plain and Leduc respectively. After much lobbying and petitions over approximately five years, lands were severed from Parkland County and Leduc County, as well as a small portion of Yellowhead County to the west, to create Improvement District No. 222 on December 31, 1987, which incorporated as the Municipal District of Brazeau No. 77 six months later on July 1, 1988. The municipality subsequently changed its name to Brazeau County on October 1, 2002.

== Geography ==
=== Communities and localities ===
The following urban municipalities are surrounded by Brazeau County.

Cities

- none

Towns

- Drayton Valley

Villages

- Breton

Summer villages

- none

The following hamlets are located within Brazeau County.

Hamlets

- Buck Creek
- Cynthia
- Lodgepole
- Poplar Ridge
- Rocky Rapids
- Violet Grove

The following localities are located within Brazeau County.

Localities

- Alsike
- Antross
- Beaver Estates
- Berrymoor
- Birch Field Estates
- Birchwood Village Greens
- Boggy Hall
- Brazeau Dam
- Carnwood
- Cottonwood Subdivision
- Country Classic Estates
- Country Style Trailer Court
- Easyford

- Fairway Meadows
- Lindale
- Meadow Land Acres
- Parview Estates
- Pembina
- Pleasant View
- Rex Block
- River Ridge Subdivision
- Round Valley
- Valley Drive
- Valley Drive Acres
- West Bank Acres

== Demographics ==
In the 2021 Census of Population conducted by Statistics Canada, Brazeau County had a population of 7,179 living in 2,860 of its 3,167 total private dwellings, a change of −7.6% from its 2016 population of 7,771. With a land area of 3,000.14 km^{2} (1,158.36 sq mi), it had a population density of 2.4/km^{2} (6.2/sq mi) in 2021.

In the 2016 Census of Population conducted by Statistics Canada, Brazeau County had a population of 7,771 living in 2,930 of its 3,194 total private dwellings, a 9% change from its 2011 population of 7,132. With a land area of 3,005.35 km^{2} (1,160.37 sq mi), it had a population density of 2.6/km^{2} (6.7/sq mi) in 2016.

Visible minority and Aboriginal population (Canada 2006 Census)
| Population group | | Population | % of total population |
|---|---|---|---|
| White | | 6,425 | 91.2% |
| Visible minority group Source: | South Asian | 15 | 0.2% |
| Visible minority group Source: | Chinese | 30 | 0.4% |
| Visible minority group Source: | Black | 45 | 0.6% |
| Visible minority group Source: | Filipino | 20 | 0.3% |
| Visible minority group Source: | Latin American | 0 | 0% |
| Visible minority group Source: | Arab | 0 | 0% |
| Visible minority group Source: | Southeast Asian | 0 | 0% |
| Visible minority group Source: | West Asian | 0 | 0% |
| Visible minority group Source: | Korean | 0 | 0% |
| Visible minority group Source: | Japanese | 0 | 0% |
| Visible minority group Source: | Visible minority, n.i.e. | 0 | 0% |
| Visible minority group Source: | Multiple visible minority | 0 | 0% |
| Total visible minority population | | 120 | 1.7% |
| Aboriginal group Source: | First Nations | 110 | 1.6% |
| Aboriginal group Source: | Métis | 375 | 5.3% |
| Aboriginal group Source: | Inuit | 0 | 0% |
| Aboriginal group Source: | Aboriginal, n.i.e. | 0 | 0% |
| Aboriginal group Source: | Multiple Aboriginal identity | 10 | 0.1% |
| Total Aboriginal population | | 500 | 7.1% |
| Total population | | 7,045 | 100% |

== See also ==
- List of communities in Alberta
- List of municipal districts in Alberta
