= Warburg, Alberta =

Warburg
- Village
- Village of Warburg
- Location of Warburg in Alberta
- Coordinates: 53°10′45″N 114°19′8″W
- Country: Canada
- Province: Alberta
- Region: Edmonton Metropolitan Region
- Census Division: 11
- Municipal district: Leduc County
- Incorporated
  - Village: December 31, 1953

Government
  - Mayor: Dwayne Mayr
  - Council: List: Cody Henderson; Tom Davy; Steven Swartz; Rick Hart

Area (2021)
  - Land: 2.56 km^{2} (0.99 sq mi)
- Elevation: 820 m (2,690 ft)

Population (2021)
  - Total: 676
  - Density: 264.5/km^{2} (685/sq mi)
- Time zone: UTC−06:00 (Alberta Time)
- Highways: 39; 770
- Waterways: Strawberry Creek
- Website: www.warburg.ca

Warburg is a village in central Alberta, Canada. It is approximately 58 km (36 mi) west of Leduc on Highway 39. The village is named for Varberg Fortress in Sweden. The fortress's name was once spelled Warberg in English, but a spelling error resulted in the name Warburg.

== Demographics ==
In the 2021 Census of Population conducted by Statistics Canada, the Village of Warburg had a population of 676 living in 283 of its 325 total private dwellings, a change of −11.7% from its 2016 population of 766. With a land area of 2.56 km^{2} (0.99 sq mi), it had a population density of 264.1/km^{2} (683.9/sq mi) in 2021.

In the 2016 Census of Population conducted by Statistics Canada, the Village of Warburg recorded a population of 766 living in 302 of its 335 total private dwellings, a −2.9% change from its 2011 population of 789. With a land area of 2.68 km^{2} (1.03 sq mi), it had a population density of 285.8/km^{2} (740.3/sq mi) in 2016.

== Economy ==
The village of Warburg is a member of the Leduc-Nisku Economic Development Association, an economic development partnership that markets Alberta's International Region in proximity to the Edmonton International Airport.

== Notable people ==
Notable hockey players and coaches from Warburg include Dave Hakstol, Marty Ruff and Lindy Ruff .

== See also ==
- List of communities in Alberta
- List of villages in Alberta
