= St. Francis, Alberta =

Hamlet in Alberta, Canada

St. Francis
- Hamlet
- Location of St. Francis in Leduc County St. Francis (Alberta)
- Coordinates: 53.2797°N 114.3411°W
- Country: Canada
- Province: Alberta
- Region: Central Alberta
- Census division: No. 11
- Municipal District: Leduc County

Government
  - Type: Unincorporated
  - Governing body: Leduc County Council: Glenn Belozer; Tanni Doblanko; Kelly-Lynn Lewis; Raymond Scobie; Rick Smith; Kelly Vandenberghe; Larry Wanchuk
  - Manager: Duane Coleman
- Time zone: UTC−06:00 (Alberta Time)

St. Francis is a hamlet in central Alberta, Canada that is under the jurisdiction of Leduc County. It is 10 kilometres (6.2 mi) north of Highway 39 and 52 kilometres (32 mi) west of Leduc.

== See also ==
- List of hamlets in Alberta
