= Poplar Ridge, Alberta =

Hamlet in Alberta

Poplar Ridge
- Hamlet
- Location of Poplar Ridge Poplar Ridge (Canada)
- Coordinates: 53°13′31″N 115°00′48″W
- Country: Canada
- Province: Alberta
- Region: Central Alberta
- Census division: 11
- Municipal district: Brazeau County

Government
  - Type: Unincorporated
  - Governing body: Brazeau County Council

Population (2005)
  - Total: 604
- Time zone: UTC−06:00 (Alberta Time)
- Area codes: 780, 587, 825

Poplar Ridge is a hamlet in central Alberta, Canada within Brazeau County. It is located 1 kilometre (0.62 mi) northwest of Highway 22, approximately 107 kilometres (66 mi) southwest of Edmonton.

== Demographics ==
The population of Poplar Ridge according to the 2005 municipal census conducted by Brazeau County is 604.

== See also ==
- List of communities in Alberta
- List of designated places in Alberta
- List of hamlets in Alberta
