= Lodgepole, Alberta =

Hamlet in Brazeau County, Alberta, Canada

Lodgepole
- Hamlet
- Location of Lodgepole Lodgepole (Canada)
- Coordinates: 53°06′02″N 115°18′49″W
- Country: Canada
- Province: Alberta
- Region: Central Alberta
- Census division: 11
- Municipal district: Brazeau County

Government
  - Type: Unincorporated
  - Governing body: Brazeau County Council

Area (2021)
  - Land: 1.74 km^{2} (0.67 sq mi)

Population (2021)
  - Total: 117
  - Density: 67.2/km^{2} (174/sq mi)
- Time zone: UTC−06:00 (Alberta Time)
- Area codes: 780, 587, 825

Lodgepole is a hamlet in central Alberta, Canada within Brazeau County. It is located approximately 31 kilometres (19 mi) west of Highway 22 and 131 kilometres (81 mi) southwest of Edmonton.

== History ==
The Town of Lodgepole was established on July 1, 1956, and had a population of 508 by 1961. The population declined to 207 by 1966. The town was dissolved in 1970, becoming a hamlet.

On October 17, 1982, a sour gas well AMOCO DOME BRAZEAU RIVER 13-12-48-12, being drilled 20 km west of Lodgepole, blew out. The burning well was finally capped 67 days later by the Texas well-control company, Boots & Coots.

== Demographics ==
In the 2021 Census of Population conducted by Statistics Canada, Lodgepole had a population of 117 living in 58 of its 70 total private dwellings, a change of 0.9% from its 2016 population of 116. With a land area of 1.74 km^{2} (0.67 sq mi), it had a population density of 67.2/km^{2} (174.2/sq mi) in 2021.

As a designated place in the 2016 Census of Population conducted by Statistics Canada, Lodgepole had a population of 116 living in 53 of its 59 total private dwellings, a change of −7.2% from its 2011 population of 125. With a land area of 1.75 km^{2} (0.68 sq mi), it had a population density of 66.3/km^{2} (171.7/sq mi) in 2016.

== See also ==
- List of communities in Alberta
- List of designated places in Alberta
- List of former urban municipalities in Alberta
- List of hamlets in Alberta
