= Buck Creek, Alberta =

Buck Creek
- Hamlet
- Location of Buck Creek Buck Creek (Canada)
- Coordinates: 53°06′14″N 114°53′44″W
- Country: Canada
- Province: Alberta
- Region: Central Alberta
- Census division: 11
- Municipal district: Brazeau County

Government
  - Type: Unincorporated
  - Governing body: Brazeau County Council

Population (2005)
  - Total: 107
- Time zone: UTC−06:00 (Alberta Time)
- Area codes: 780, 587, 825

Buck Creek is a hamlet in central Alberta, Canada within Brazeau County. It is located 3 km (1.9 mi) west of Highway 22, approximately 106 km (66 mi) southwest of Edmonton. The first school opened in 1934.

== Demographics ==
The population of Buck Creek according to the 2005 municipal census conducted by Brazeau County is 107.

== See also ==
- List of communities in Alberta
- List of hamlets in Alberta
