= Violet Grove =

- Hamlet
- Location of Violet Grove Violet Grove (Canada)
- Coordinates: 53°09′35″N 115°02′13″W
- Country: Canada
- Province: Alberta
- Region: Central Alberta
- Census division: 11
- Municipal district: Brazeau County

Government
  - Type: Unincorporated
  - Governing body: Brazeau County Council

Population (2005)
  - Total: 141
- Time zone: UTC−06:00 (Alberta Time)
- Area codes: 780, 587, 825

Violet Grove is a hamlet in central Alberta, Canada within Brazeau County. It is located 7 km (4.3 mi) southwest of Drayton Valley on Highway 620, approximately 110 km (68 mi) southwest of Edmonton.

== Toponymy ==
Violet Grove is named for Violet Forsyth, an early resident who opened a general store in the hamlet in the early 1930s. Prior to becoming formally known as Violet Grove in 1934, when a post office by that name was established, the area was colloquially known as Soda Creek.

== History ==
=== Pre-settlement ===
Before the arrival of permanent settlers, the area now known as Violet Grove was within the territory of the Cree people. Surveyor and fur trader David Thompson passed through the area in 1810.

=== Founding: 1907–1949 ===
The permanent settlement of Violet Grove began in 1907 with the arrival of lumber operations, followed by homesteaders shortly thereafter. Demand for lumber declined by the early 1920s, and farming became the cornerstone of Violet Grove's economy as the greater Drayton Valley area avoided the drought other parts of Alberta suffered during the Great Depression.

Violet Grove's population had grown enough by the early 1930s that residents Ernest and Violet Forsyth opened a general store to serve the locality. Violet Grove School opened in 1933, with Ernest Forsyth serving as one of its first teachers.

In 1933, local farmer Matthew Burnett decided to establish a post office for the area, and sought suggestions for names from his neighbours. Proposals included the name 'Soda Creek,' though Burnett chose to apply to open a post office named Violet Grove in honour of Violet Forsyth. The number of violets growing in the area also contributed to Burnett's decision. The post office opened in February 1934.

Beginning in 1936, residents of Violet Grove received medical care and midwifery services through the Lady Farren Memorial Mission and Nursing Centre, based in the Anglican church in Drayton Valley. Nurses and midwives based at the centre visited settlements in the area today known as Brazeau County to offer medical and spiritual services. This arrangement continued until around 1958, after the influx of workers to the Drayton Valley area necessitated the construction of Drayton Valley Hospital.

A second general store began operating in Violet Grove in 1938.

=== Oil boom and decline: 1950–2000 ===
Oil was discovered in the vicinity of Violet Grove in 1953. As one resident later recalled, "Drayton Valley and Violet Grove became [like] cities overnight" as available work in oil drilling attracted workers to the area. At this time, Violet Grove still lacked infrastructure such as roads and modern housing; a series of plywood or tar paper shanties were hastily built to house an influx of workers.

In 1963, Violet Grove School closed due to a lack of demand. The locality's population began to decline as exploratory drilling activities came to a close; established oilfield operations subsequently required fewer temporary workers.

Violet Grove's post office closed in January 1980. Violet Grove officially became a hamlet on April 8, 1993.

=== 21st century: 2001–present ===
In 2013, Brazeau County's council voted to install a commemorative sign recognizing the hamlet's now-closed historical school, Violet Grove School, as part of the county's 25th anniversary celebrations.

== Demographics ==
The population of Violet Grove according to the 2005 municipal census conducted by Brazeau County is 141.

== Amenities and Services ==
=== Amenities ===
As of 2025, the hamlet's community centre, Violet Grove Hall, remains operational. The hamlet is also home to Violet Grove Community Park, which contains a playground and outdoor ice skating rink.

=== Services ===
Violet Grove's wastewater is treated using a constructed floating wetlands system. Garbage and recyclables are processed through Violet Grove Transfer Station, operated by Brazeau County. The transfer station underwent upgrades in mid-2026.

Violet Grove is the nearest settlement to Moon Valley Cemetery, which lies 7 kilometres from the hamlet and operates as an independent cemetery.

== See also ==
- List of communities in Alberta
- List of hamlets in Alberta
