= Rocky Rapids =

- Hamlet
- Location of Rocky Rapids in Alberta
- Coordinates: 53°16′47″N 114°57′06″W
- Country: Canada
- Province: Alberta
- Municipal district: Brazeau County
- Established: 1909

Government
  - Type: Reeve-Council
  - Reeve: Wes Tweedle

Population (2005)
  - Total: 317
- Time zone: UTC−06:00 (Alberta Time)
- Postal code: TOE 1Z0
- Area code: 780

Rocky Rapids is a hamlet in central Alberta, Canada within Brazeau County. It is located 1.6 km (0.99 mi) east of Highway 22, approximately 7 km (4.3 mi) north of Drayton Valley.

== Demographics ==
The population of Rocky Rapids according to the 2005 municipal census conducted by Brazeau County is 317.

== Economy ==
Located within the Pembina oil field, the economy of Rocky Rapids is based mostly on oil and gas.

== Arts and culture ==
The Easyfest Music Festival used to be held in Rocky Rapids but is now defunct.

== Amenities ==
Rocky Rapids has an outdoor skating rink, basketball hoops, and a park with playground amenities. A pedestrian path links Rocky Rapids with Drayton Valley to the south.

== Government ==
Rocky Rapids is located within Division 4 of Brazeau County. On council, Division 4 is represented by Councillor Kara Westerlund (Dykstra), who was elected in the 2010 Alberta municipal elections. Wes Tweedle is the reeve of Brazeau County.

== Transportation ==
Rocky Rapids is linked to Highway 22 to the west via Township Road 500. The Drayton Valley Industrial Airport is located 2 kilometres (1.2 mi) south of Rocky Rapids.

== See also ==
- List of communities in Alberta
- List of hamlets in Alberta
