= Conjuring Creek =

Stream in Alberta, Canada

Coordinates: 53°21′18″N 113°47′53″W

Conjuring Creek is a stream in Alberta, Canada, and is a minor tributary of the North Saskatchewan River. It originates at Wizard Lake and drains into the North Saskatchewan River. It runs from south to north passing through the town of Calmar.

Conjuring Creek was named in complement to Wizard Lake in its headwaters.

== See also ==
- List of rivers of Alberta
