= Calmar, Alberta =

Calmar
- Town
- Town of Calmar
- Logo

- Location of Calmar in Alberta Calmar (Canada)
- Coordinates: 53°15′54″N 113°48′19″W
- Country: Canada
- Province: Alberta
- Region: Edmonton Metropolitan Region
- Census division: 11
- Municipal district: Leduc County
- Incorporated
  - Village: January 1, 1949
  - Town: January 19, 1954

Government
  - Mayor: Sean Carnahan
  - Governing body: Calmar Town Council
  - MP: Mike Lake (Edmonton - Wetaskiwin-Cons)

Area (2021)
  - Land: 4.67 km^{2} (1.80 sq mi)
- Elevation: 730 m (2,400 ft)

Population (2021)
  - Total: 2,183
  - Density: 467.6/km^{2} (1,211/sq mi)
- Time zone: UTC−06:00 (Alberta Time)
- Postal code: T0C
- Area codes: 780, 587, 825
- Highways: Highway 39, Highway 795
- Waterways: Conjuring Creek
- Website: Official website

Calmar is a town in central Alberta, Canada. It is located in Leduc County, on Highway 39, 35 kilometres (22 mi) southwest from Edmonton. It was named in 1900 for Kalmar, Sweden, the home town of its first postmaster, C. J. Blomquist.

== Geography ==
=== Climate ===
Calmar experiences a humid continental climate (Köppen Dfb).

Climate data for Calmar, Alberta
Month	Jan	Feb	Mar	Apr	May	Jun	Jul	Aug	Sep	Oct	Nov	Dec	Year
Record high °C (°F)	14.4 (57.9)	17.2 (63.0)	20.0 (68.0)	31.1 (88.0)	32.5 (90.5)	36.7 (98.1)	35.6 (96.1)	35.5 (95.9)	34.5 (94.1)	29.5 (85.1)	23.3 (73.9)	17.8 (64.0)	36.7 (98.1)
Mean daily maximum °C (°F)	−5.5 (22.1)	−2.2 (28.0)	2.5 (36.5)	11.8 (53.2)	18.3 (64.9)	21.1 (70.0)	23.3 (73.9)	22.6 (72.7)	17.7 (63.9)	11.1 (52.0)	0.3 (32.5)	−4.0 (24.8)	9.8 (49.5)
Daily mean °C (°F)	−11.2 (11.8)	−8.6 (16.5)	−3.7 (25.3)	4.9 (40.8)	10.8 (51.4)	14.4 (57.9)	16.6 (61.9)	15.5 (59.9)	10.7 (51.3)	4.5 (40.1)	−5.0 (23.0)	−9.6 (14.7)	3.3 (37.9)
Mean daily minimum °C (°F)	−17.0 (1.4)	−15.0 (5.0)	−9.6 (14.7)	−2.0 (28.4)	3.3 (37.9)	7.7 (45.9)	9.7 (49.5)	8.4 (47.1)	3.7 (38.7)	−2.1 (28.2)	−10.2 (13.6)	−15.2 (4.6)	−3.2 (26.3)
Record low °C (°F)	−48.9 (−56.0)	−49.4 (−56.9)	−42.2 (−44.0)	−31.7 (−25.1)	−11.1 (12.0)	−5.0 (23.0)	−3.3 (26.1)	−4.0 (24.8)	−16.1 (3.0)	−30.6 (−23.1)	−40.6 (−41.1)	−48.9 (−56.0)	−49.4 (−56.9)
Average precipitation mm (inches)	27.4 (1.08)	16.8 (0.66)	23.0 (0.91)	26.6 (1.05)	54.3 (2.14)	79.7 (3.14)	109.6 (4.31)	63.0 (2.48)	46.9 (1.85)	30.5 (1.20)	22.9 (0.90)	15.0 (0.59)	515.7 (20.31)
Average rainfall mm (inches)	1.2 (0.05)	0.8 (0.03)	1.1 (0.04)	14.4 (0.57)	50.4 (1.98)	79.7 (3.14)	109.6 (4.31)	63.0 (2.48)	46.4 (1.83)	16.2 (0.64)	2.0 (0.08)	0.6 (0.02)	385.4 (15.17)
Average snowfall cm (inches)	26.3 (10.4)	16.0 (6.3)	21.9 (8.6)	12.2 (4.8)	3.9 (1.5)	0.0 (0.0)	0.0 (0.0)	0.0 (0.0)	0.6 (0.2)	14.4 (5.7)	20.9 (8.2)	14.4 (5.7)	130.6 (51.4)
Average precipitation days (≥ 0.2 mm)	8.1	6.4	6.7	6.4	8.8	13.3	13.5	11.2	9.8	6.9	7.5	6.8	105.4
Average rainy days (≥ 0.2 mm)	0.41	0.15	0.65	4.3	8.4	137.3	13.5	11.2	9.8	4.8	1.2	0.50	192.21
Average snowy days (≥ 0.2 cm)	7.7	6.2	6.1	2.4	0.56	0.0	0.0	0.04	0.19	2.6	6.4	6.4	38.59
Source: Environment Canada

== Demographics ==
In the 2021 Census of Population conducted by Statistics Canada, the Town of Calmar had a population of 2,183 living in 893 of its 937 total private dwellings, a change of −2% from its 2016 population of 2,228. With a land area of 4.67 km^{2} (1.80 sq mi), it had a population density of 467.5/km^{2} (1,210.7/sq mi) in 2021.

In the 2016 Census of Population conducted by Statistics Canada, the Town of Calmar recorded a population of 2,228 living in 842 of its 861 total private dwellings, a 13.1% change from its 2011 population of 1,970. With a land area of 4.68 km^{2} (1.81 sq mi), it had a population density of 476.1/km^{2} (1,233.0/sq mi) in 2016.

The population of the Town of Calmar according to its 2014 municipal census is 2,101, a 3.3% change from its 2009 municipal census population of 2,033.

== Economy ==
The Town of Calmar is a member of the Leduc-Nisku Economic Development Association, an economic development partnership that markets Alberta's International Region in proximity to the Edmonton International Airport.

== See also ==
- List of communities in Alberta
- List of towns in Alberta
