= Alsike, Alberta =

Coordinates: 53°11′30″N 114°27′50″W

Location of Alsike Alberta

Alsike is an unincorporated community in central Alberta in Leduc County, located on Highway 39, Highway 20. It is 61 kilometres (38 mi) west of Leduc. The first general store opened in 1938.

The Fort Saskatchewan Correctional Facility has an affiliated Alsike Camp.

The Alsike area has been studied for its fungus outbreaks, first Ambrosiella and Raffaelea in certain trees, spread by symbiotic host beetles. In 1983, the area's clover (which is a major part of horses' diet) was struck by a fungus epidemic of Olpidium brassicae and Ligniera species, previously not seen in Canada.
