= Devon, Alberta =

Town in Alberta, Canada

Devon
- Town
- Town of Devon
- Logo

- Location of Devon in Alberta Devon (Canada)
- Coordinates: 53°21′48″N 113°43′56″W
- Country: Canada
- Province: Alberta
- Region: Edmonton Metropolitan Region
- Census division: 11
- Municipal district: Leduc County
- Adjacent municipal district: Parkland County
- Incorporated
  - Village: December 31, 1949
  - Town: February 24, 1950
- Named for: Devonian Period

Government
  - Type: Town Council
  - Mayor: Jeff Craddock
  - Governing body: Devon Town Council
  - MLA: Andrew Boitchenko
  - MP: Mike Lake

Area (2021)
  - Land: 14.26 km^{2} (5.51 sq mi)
- Elevation: 709 m (2,326 ft)

Population (2021)
  - Total: 6,545
  - Density: 459.1/km^{2} (1,189/sq mi)
- Time zone: UTC−06:00 (Alberta Time)
- Forward sortation area: T9G
- Area code: 780
- Highways: 19, 60
- Waterways: North Saskatchewan River
- Website: devon.ca

Devon is a town in the Edmonton Metropolitan Region of Alberta, Canada. It is approximately 26 kilometres (16 mi) southwest of Edmonton, the provincial capital, along the southern bank of the North Saskatchewan River.

== History ==
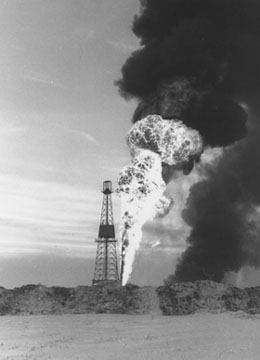
Leduc No. 1

Devon owes its existence to one of the largest oil discoveries in the world. On February 13, 1947, the Imperial Leduc No. 1 well struck oil, and the new town of Devon was constructed shortly thereafter by Imperial Oil to accommodate its workers. The company was determined that the town would be well-planned, and Devon holds the distinction of being the first Canadian community to be approved by a regional planning commission. The oil industry remains a major player in the town's business sector, though the economy has diversified to include tourism, manufacturing, and research.

Devon is named after the Devonian formation (the strata tapped in the Leduc No. 1 oil well), which in turn is named for the county of Devon in England.

== Demographics ==
In the 2021 Census of Population conducted by Statistics Canada, the Town of Devon had a population of 6,545 living in 2,496 of its 2,588 total private dwellings, a change of −0.5% from its 2016 population of 6,578. With a land area of 14.26 km^{2} (5.51 sq mi), it had a population density of 459.0/km^{2} (1,188.7/sq mi) in 2021.

In the 2016 Census of Population conducted by Statistics Canada, the Town of Devon recorded a population of 6,578 living in 2,415 of its 2,493 total private dwellings, a 1% change from its 2011 population of 6,515. With a land area of 14.3 km^{2} (5.5 sq mi), it had a population density of 460.0/km^{2} (1,191.4/sq mi) in 2016.

The population of the town of Devon according to its 2014 municipal census is 6,650, a 1.8% change from its 2009 municipal census population of 6,534.

== Economy ==
The town of Devon was a member of the Leduc-Nisku Economic Development Association, an economic development partnership that markets Alberta's International Region in proximity to the Edmonton International Airport.

== Amenities ==
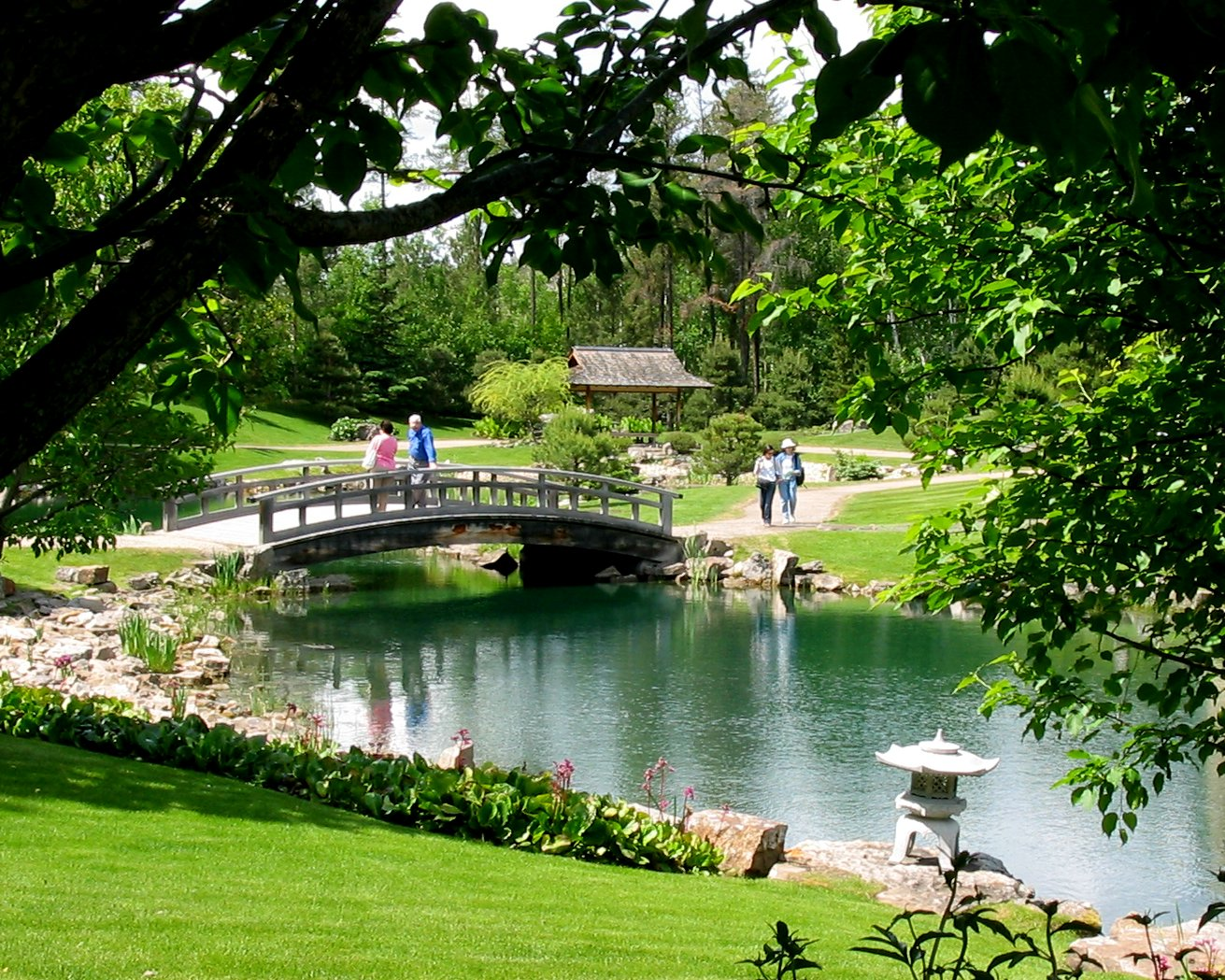
University of Alberta Botanic Garden north of Devon

Devon is amply served by schools, community services such as the Devon General Hospital, and recreational facilities. It is located close to a motor sports park, a bird sanctuary, the University of Alberta Botanic Garden, and a number of other attractions to residents and visitors. Devon and area is popular with cyclists, as it has a good network of paved country roads, as well as unpaved mountain bike trails, and has hosted high level cycling events such as Canada's 2010 National Road Championships.

== Climate ==
Devon has a warm-summer humid continental climate (Köppen: Dfb), slightly cooler than Edmonton. On average at 3.6 days a year the temperature is above 30 °C (86 °F) days above 35 °C (95 °F) do not always occur, but on average four years in a decade. Days with temperatures below −30 °C (−22 °F) occur every year on average 8.8 nights. In about 58.4% of the days of a year the temperature can reach a value less than or equal to the freezing temperature. Frost free will go from the beginning of June until the first week of September, usually. It corresponds in average to 96 days.

Climate data for Woodbend (Devon-Edmonton, Devonian Botanic Garden), Climate ID: 3012230; coordinates 53°25′N 113°45′W; elevation: 670.6 m (2,200 ft); 1981–2010 normals, extremes 1973–2007
Month	Jan	Feb	Mar	Apr	May	Jun	Jul	Aug	Sep	Oct	Nov	Dec	Year
Record high °C (°F)	13.0 (55.4)	16.0 (60.8)	24.0 (75.2)	30.6 (87.1)	33.5 (92.3)	35.0 (95.0)	35.5 (95.9)	35.0 (95.0)	35.0 (95.0)	30.5 (86.9)	20.0 (68.0)	15.0 (59.0)	35.5 (95.9)
Mean daily maximum °C (°F)	−5.4 (22.3)	−2.4 (27.7)	2.9 (37.2)	11.8 (53.2)	18.1 (64.6)	21.3 (70.3)	23.5 (74.3)	22.4 (72.3)	17.2 (63.0)	10.5 (50.9)	0.0 (32.0)	−4.1 (24.6)	9.7 (49.4)
Daily mean °C (°F)	−11.1 (12.0)	−8.6 (16.5)	−3.3 (26.1)	4.7 (40.5)	10.4 (50.7)	14.1 (57.4)	16.4 (61.5)	15.2 (59.4)	10.1 (50.2)	4.2 (39.6)	−4.9 (23.2)	−9.7 (14.5)	3.1 (37.6)
Mean daily minimum °C (°F)	−16.7 (1.9)	−14.8 (5.4)	−9.5 (14.9)	−2.4 (27.7)	2.7 (36.9)	6.9 (44.4)	9.3 (48.7)	8.0 (46.4)	2.9 (37.2)	−2.2 (28.0)	−9.9 (14.2)	−15.2 (4.6)	−3.4 (25.9)
Record low °C (°F)	−45.0 (−49.0)	−45.0 (−49.0)	−40.0 (−40.0)	−30.0 (−22.0)	−10.0 (14.0)	−2.5 (27.5)	1.0 (33.8)	−4.0 (24.8)	−10.0 (14.0)	−25.0 (−13.0)	−35.0 (−31.0)	−46.0 (−50.8)	−46.0 (−50.8)
Average precipitation mm (inches)	24.8 (0.98)	14.3 (0.56)	22.2 (0.87)	27.3 (1.07)	52.3 (2.06)	84.5 (3.33)	102.7 (4.04)	67.0 (2.64)	49.5 (1.95)	25.6 (1.01)	22.5 (0.89)	15.3 (0.60)	508 (20)
Average rainfall mm (inches)	1.2 (0.05)	0.3 (0.01)	1.5 (0.06)	16.2 (0.64)	47.5 (1.87)	84.5 (3.33)	102.7 (4.04)	66.7 (2.63)	48.6 (1.91)	14.6 (0.57)	1.7 (0.07)	0.7 (0.03)	386.2 (15.21)
Average snowfall cm (inches)	23.6 (9.3)	14.1 (5.6)	20.6 (8.1)	11.1 (4.4)	4.8 (1.9)	0.0 (0.0)	0.0 (0.0)	0.3 (0.1)	0.9 (0.4)	11.0 (4.3)	20.8 (8.2)	14.5 (5.7)	121.7 (48)
Average precipitation days (≥ 0.2 mm)	9.1	6.9	7.6	7.0	10.3	14.7	15.2	12.4	10.3	7.4	8.1	7.1	116.1
Average rainy days (≥ 0.2 mm)	0.67	0.23	1.1	4.6	10.1	14.7	15.2	12.4	10.2	5.4	1.1	0.31	76.01
Average snowy days (≥ 0.2 cm)	8.5	6.7	6.6	2.9	0.56	0.0	0.0	0.04	0.26	2.4	7.1	6.9	41.96
Source: Environment and Climate Change Canada

== Schools ==
- Devon Christian School
- Holy Spirit Catholic School
- John Maland High School
- Riverview Middle School
- Robina Baker Elementary

== See also ==
- List of communities in Alberta
- List of towns in Alberta
