= Edmonton Metropolitan Region =

- Metropolitan area
- Member municipalities of the Edmonton Metropolitan Region Board

- Location of the region in Alberta
- Coordinates: 53°34′N 113°31′W
- Country: Canada
- Province: Alberta

Area (2021)
  - CMA: 9,416.19 km^{2} (3,635.61 sq mi)

Population (2021)
  - Total: 1,472,402
  - Estimate (2025): 1,692,385
  - Rank: 5th in Canada

GDP
  - CMA: CDN$110 billion
- Time zone: UTC−06:00 (Alberta Time)
- Forward sortation areas: T4X to T6Z, T7X to T8R, T8T, T9E to T9G
- Area codes: 780, 587, 825
- Highways: 2, 2A, 14, 15, 16, 16A, 19, 21, 28, 28A, 37, 39, 43, 44, 60, 100, 216
- Website: emrb.ca

The Edmonton Metropolitan Region (EMR), commonly referred to as Greater Edmonton or Metro Edmonton, is a conglomeration of municipalities centred on the urban city of Edmonton, the capital city of the Canadian province of Alberta.

While the EMR is not a strictly defined entity, its commonly known boundaries are coincident with those of the Edmonton census metropolitan area (CMA) as delineated by Statistics Canada. However, the now defunct Edmonton Metropolitan Region Board (EMRB) – established by the provincial government to provide a form of regional government, fostering cooperation for regional planning amongst the City of Edmonton and its surrounding municipalities – had a membership that differed slightly from the CMA.

The EMR is considered a major gateway to northern Alberta and the Canadian North, particularly for many companies, including airlines and oil/natural gas exploration. Located within central Alberta and at the northern end of the Calgary–Edmonton Corridor, the EMR is both the northernmost metropolitan area in Canada and the northernmost metropolitan area in North America with a population over one million.

== Edmonton CMA ==
As of the 2021 Canadian census, the Edmonton CMA includes the following 34 census subdivisions (municipalities or municipality equivalents):

- six cities (Beaumont, Edmonton, Fort Saskatchewan, Leduc, Spruce Grove and St. Albert);
- one specialized municipality (Strathcona County, which includes the Sherwood Park urban service area);
- three municipal districts (Leduc County, Parkland County, and Sturgeon County);
- ten towns (Bon Accord, Bruderheim, Calmar, Devon, Gibbons, Legal, Morinville, Redwater, Stony Plain and Thorsby);
- two villages (Spring Lake and Warburg);
- eight summer villages (Betula Beach, Golden Days, Itaska Beach, Kapasiwin, Lakeview, Point Alison, Seba Beach, and Sundance Beach); and
- four Indian reserves for three First Nations (Alexander 134 of the Alexander First Nation, Enoch Cree Nation 135 of the Enoch Cree Nation, and Wabamun 133A and 133B of the Paul First Nation).

The Edmonton CMA is the largest of the 41 CMAs (Note: As of the 2021 Census, with the promotion of the Nanaimo, Kamloops, Chilliwack, Fredericton, Drummondville and Red Deer CAs to CMA status, Canada has 41 CMAs.) in Canada by area, at 9,416.19 km^{2} (3,635.61 mi^{2}). In the 2021 Canadian census, it had a population of 1,418,118, making it the sixth largest CMA in Canada by population, with the second largest percentage increase in national CMA population (37.0% versus 37.3% for the Calgary CMA) over the 15 years since the 2006 Canadian census. The Edmonton CMA comprises the majority of Statistics Canada's Division No. 11 in Alberta.

== Demographics ==
In the 2021 Census of Population conducted by Statistics Canada, the Edmonton metropolitan region recorded a population of 1,418,118 living in 548,624 of its 589,554 total private dwellings, a change of 7.3% from its 2016 population of 1,321,441. With a land area of 9,416.19 km^{2} (3,635.61 sq mi), it had a population density of 150.6/km^{2} (390.1/sq mi) in 2021.

=== Ethnicity ===
Panethnic groups in Metro Edmonton (2001−2021)
Panethnic group	2021		2016		2011		2006		2001	
Panethnic group	Pop.	%	Pop.	%	Pop.	%	Pop.	%	Pop.	%
European (Note: 2001–2016: Statistic includes all persons that did not make up part of a visible minority or an indigenous identity. 2021: Statistic includes all persons belonging to the non-indigenous and non-visible minority "White" population group.)	849,515	60.78%	857,085	66.07%	822,830	72.2%	797,420	77.81%	750,315	80.94%
South Asian	123,340	8.82%	91,420	7.05%	61,135	5.36%	40,205	3.92%	29,065	3.14%
Southeast Asian (Note: Statistic includes total responses of "Filipino" and "Southeast Asian" under visible minority section on census.)	101,410	7.26%	78,310	6.04%	56,240	4.94%	30,655	2.99%	23,865	2.57%
Indigenous	87,600	6.27%	76,205	5.87%	61,765	5.42%	52,105	5.08%	40,930	4.42%
African	80,575	5.76%	57,820	4.46%	32,725	2.87%	20,380	1.99%	14,095	1.52%
East Asian (Note: Statistic includes total responses of "Chinese", "Korean", and "Japanese" under visible minority section on census.)	74,140	5.3%	70,255	5.42%	59,140	5.19%	53,235	5.19%	45,965	4.96%
Middle Eastern (Note: Statistic includes total responses of "West Asian" and "Arab" under visible minority section on census.)	39,955	2.86%	32,255	2.49%	21,590	1.89%	14,865	1.45%	10,840	1.17%
Latin American	21,955	1.57%	18,755	1.45%	14,530	1.28%	9,210	0.9%	7,515	0.81%
Other/Multiracial (Note: Statistic includes total responses of "Visible minority, n.i.e." and "Multiple visible minorities" under visible minority section on census.)	20,200	1.45%	15,170	1.17%	9,640	0.85%	6,750	0.66%	4,430	0.48%
Total responses	1,397,750	98.56%	1,297,280	98.17%	1,139,585	98.25%	1,024,820	99.02%	927,020	98.85%
Total population	1,418,118	100%	1,321,426	100%	1,159,869	100%	1,034,945	100%	937,845	100%
Note: Totals greater than 100% due to multiple origin responses

=== Language ===
The question on knowledge of languages allows for multiple responses. The following figures are from the 2021 Canadian Census, and lists languages that were selected by at least 1,000 respondents.

Knowledge of Languages in Metro Edmonton
Language	2021	
Language	Pop.	%
English	1,372,110	98.17%
French	96,620	6.91%
Cree	3,915	0.28%
Oromo	2,615	0.19%
Somali	10,555	0.76%
Amharic	5,965	0.43%
Arabic	34,760	2.49%
Hebrew	1,360	0.1%
Tigrigna	6,440	0.46%
Khmer (Cambodian)	1,055	0.08%
Vietnamese	12,490	0.89%
Bisaya, n.o.s.	1,055	0.08%
Cebuano	3,190	0.23%
Hiligaynon	1,510	0.11%
Ilocano	4,760	0.34%
Tagalog	63,930	4.57%
Malayalam	6,485	0.46%
Tamil	4,870	0.35%
Telugu	2,140	0.15%
Czech	1,035	0.07%
Polish	10,715	0.77%
Russian	10,420	0.75%
Serbo-Croatian	5,845	0.42%
Ukrainian	12,680	0.91%
German	18,685	1.34%
Afrikaans	1,360	0.1%
Dutch	4,380	0.31%
Greek	1,545	0.11%
Bengali	3,865	0.28%
Gujarati	10,620	0.76%
Hindi	41,900	3%
Kacchi	1,110	0.08%
Marathi	1,470	0.11%
Nepali	2,500	0.18%
Punjabi	53,280	3.81%
Sinhala	2,105	0.15%
Urdu	16,575	1.19%
Pashto	1,155	0.08%
Dari	2,220	0.16%
Iranian; Persian	3,740	0.27%
Italian	8,095	0.58%
Portuguese	6,500	0.47%
Romanian	2,960	0.21%
Spanish	36,115	2.58%
Japanese	3,320	0.24%
Korean	8,020	0.57%
Akan (Twi)	1,660	0.12%
Igbo	1,295	0.09%
Kinyarwanda (Rwanda)	1,520	0.11%
Rundi (Kirundi)	1,060	0.08%
Shona	1,100	0.08%
Swahili	5,030	0.36%
Yoruba	3,230	0.23%
Mandarin	32,395	2.32%
Min Nan (Chaochow, Teochow, Fukien, Taiwanese)	1,685	0.12%
Cantonese	29,300	2.1%
Turkish	2,920	0.21%
Hungarian	1,805	0.13%
Total; Responses	1,397,750	98.56%
Total; Population	1,418,118	100%

== Edmonton Metropolitan Region Board ==
Edmonton Metropolitan Region Board logo

Fragmentation in regional cooperation and partnership has long played a divisive role within the EMR. Particularly, Edmonton was frustrated that its surrounding municipalities were receiving an increased tax base for major industrial development, while not contributing to Edmonton's burden to maintain and build new infrastructure within Edmonton used by the residents and businesses of the surrounding municipalities.

After pulling out of the Alberta Capital Region Alliance (ACRA), Edmonton lobbied the provincial government to establish some form of regional government that would be more effective in fostering regional cooperation between it and its surrounding municipalities. As a result, Premier Ed Stelmach announced in December 2007 that a governing board would be established for Edmonton's Capital Region. Four months later, the Capital Region Board was formed on April 15, 2008 with the passing of the Capital Region Board Regulation by Order in Council 127/2008 under the authority of the Municipal Government Act.

On October 26, 2017, the Capital Region Board (CRB) was renamed to the Edmonton Metropolitan Region Board (EMRB).

=== Member municipalities ===
The original Capital Region Board (CRB) was established with 25 participating or member municipalities, differing slightly from the municipalities that Statistics Canada included in the Edmonton CMA as the CRB excluded entities which did not take active involvement in the greater regional planning activity (four Indian reserves, eight summer villages and one village) while including the non-CMA Lamont County and the Town of Lamont. The number of member municipalities was reduced to 24 on September 10, 2010 after the Village of New Sarepta dissolved to hamlet status under the jurisdiction of Leduc County on September 1, 2010. Concurrent with the CRB's name change to the EMRB in October 2017, municipal membership decreased from 24 to 13, with the two non-CMA CRB members (Lamont County and Town of Lamont) no longer included, and only those municipalities within the CMA with a population of 5,000 or more remain as members (smaller municipalities are represented by their municipal districts).

More specifically, the EMRB includes:

- six cities (Beaumont, Edmonton, Fort Saskatchewan, Leduc, St. Albert, and Spruce Grove);
- one specialized municipality (Strathcona County, which includes the Sherwood Park urban service area);
- three municipal districts (Leduc County, Parkland County, and Sturgeon County); and
- three towns (Devon, Morinville, and Stony Plain).

=== Edmonton Metropolitan Region Growth Plan ===
In recent decades, the Edmonton Metro region growth plans were prepared by the CRB/EMRB organization and approved by the Government of Alberta. In 2010 the Government of Alberta adopted the Growing Forward: The Capital Region Growth Plan – this plan was in force until it was replaced in 2016 when the Government of Alberta adopted the Edmonton Metropolitan Region Growth Plan. The 2016 plan anticipated the region would be home to 2.2 million people by 2044.

=== Dissolution ===
In 2024, the provincial government announced it would no longer fund the EMRB. In January 2025, member municipalities decided to wind down the organization rather than replace the withdrawn provincial government funding. The regulatory and policy implications of the EMRB dissolution include the end to regional minimum residential density targets and regional management of prime agricultural lands.

== List of municipalities ==
The following is a list of municipalities in the Edmonton CMA, with those that are members of the EMRB indicated accordingly.

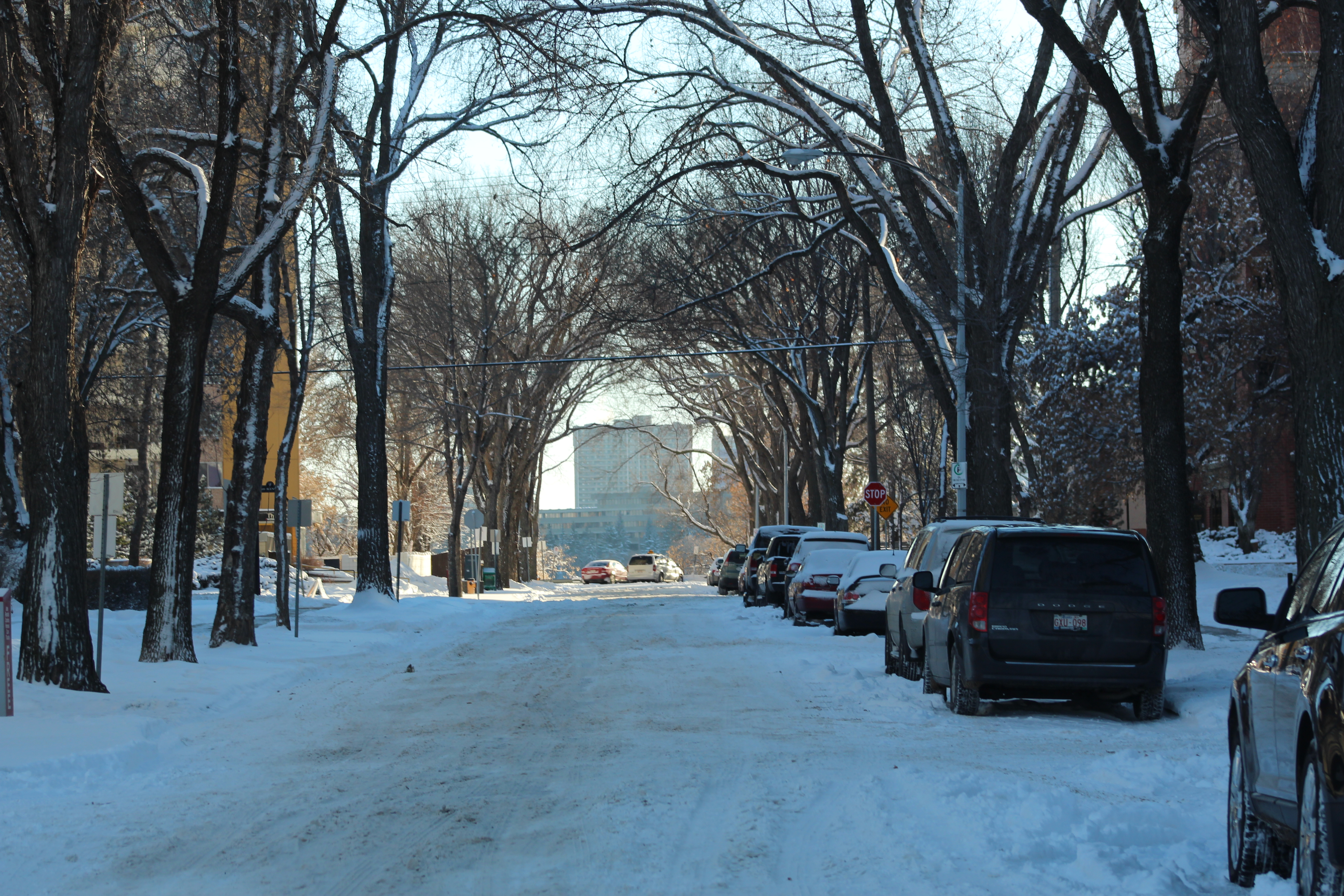
Edmonton

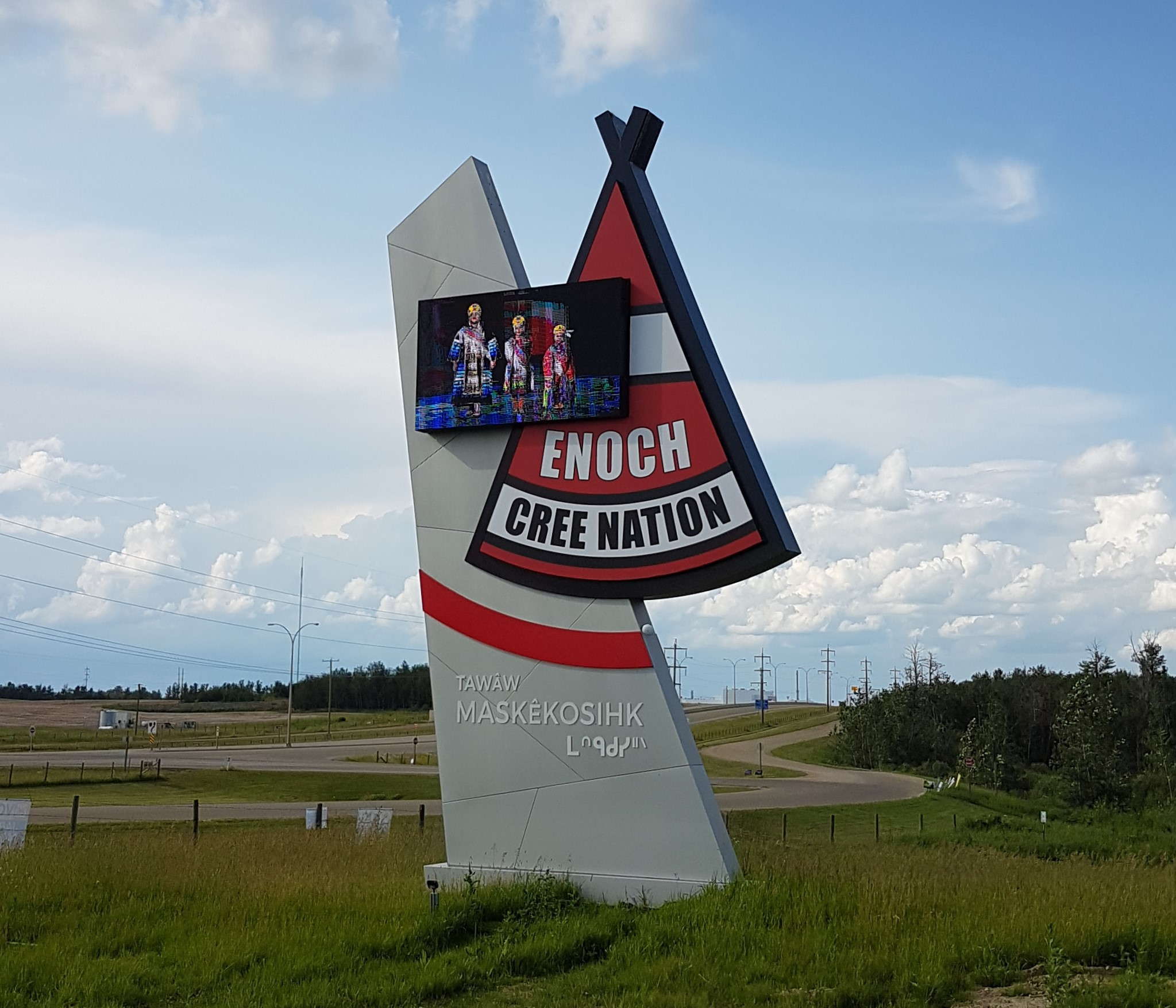
Enoch

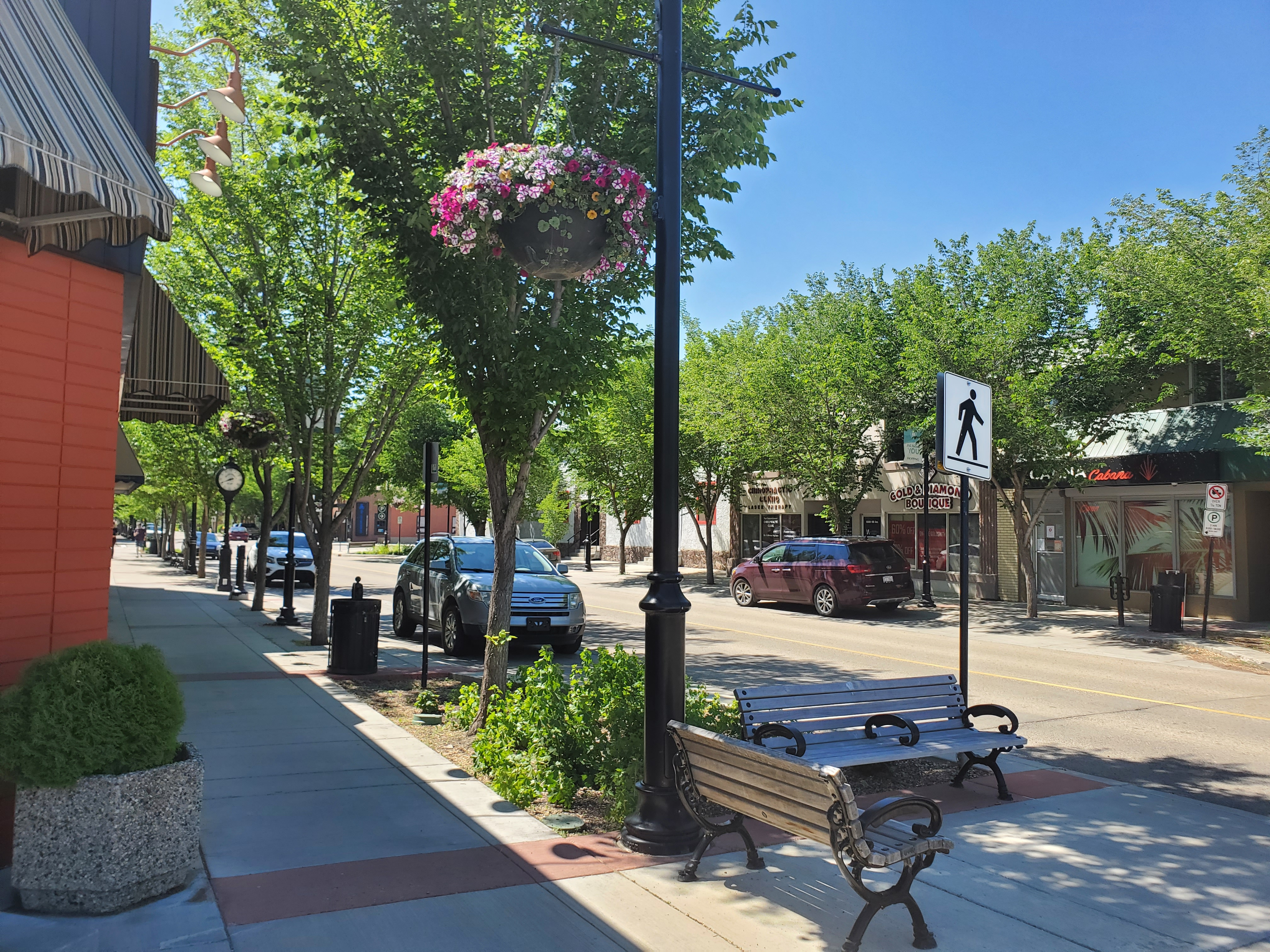
Fort Saskatchewan

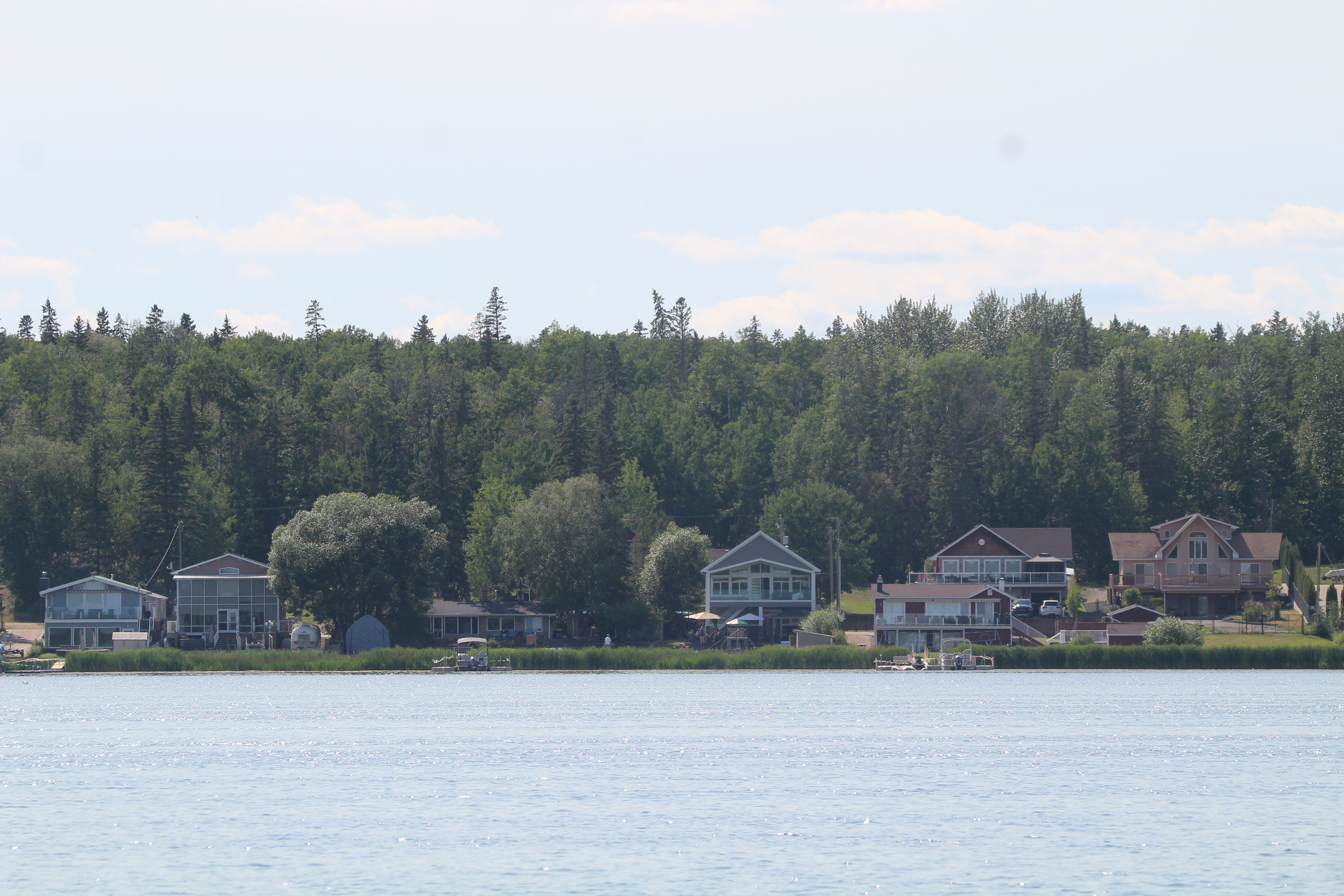
Lakeview

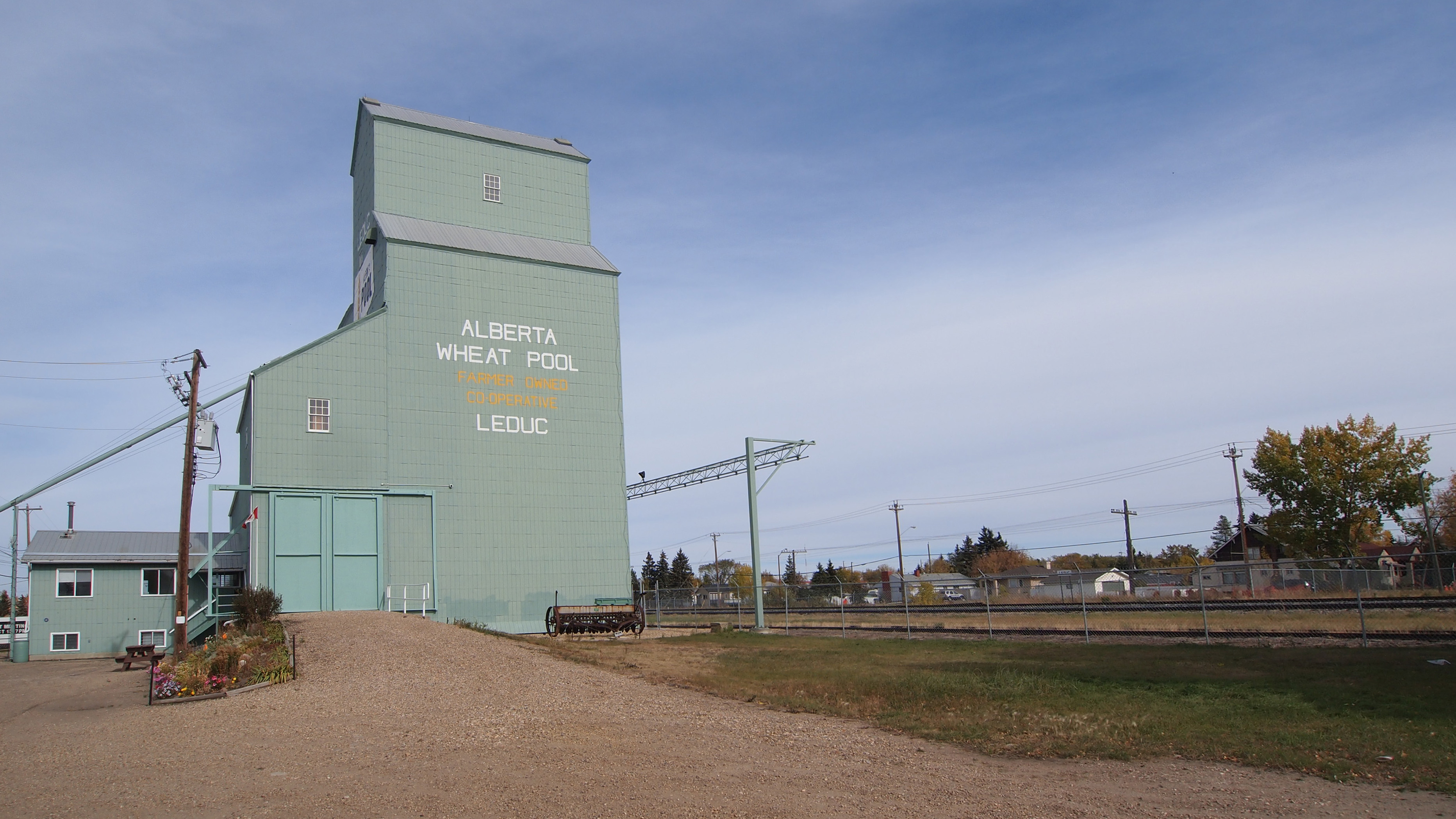
Leduc

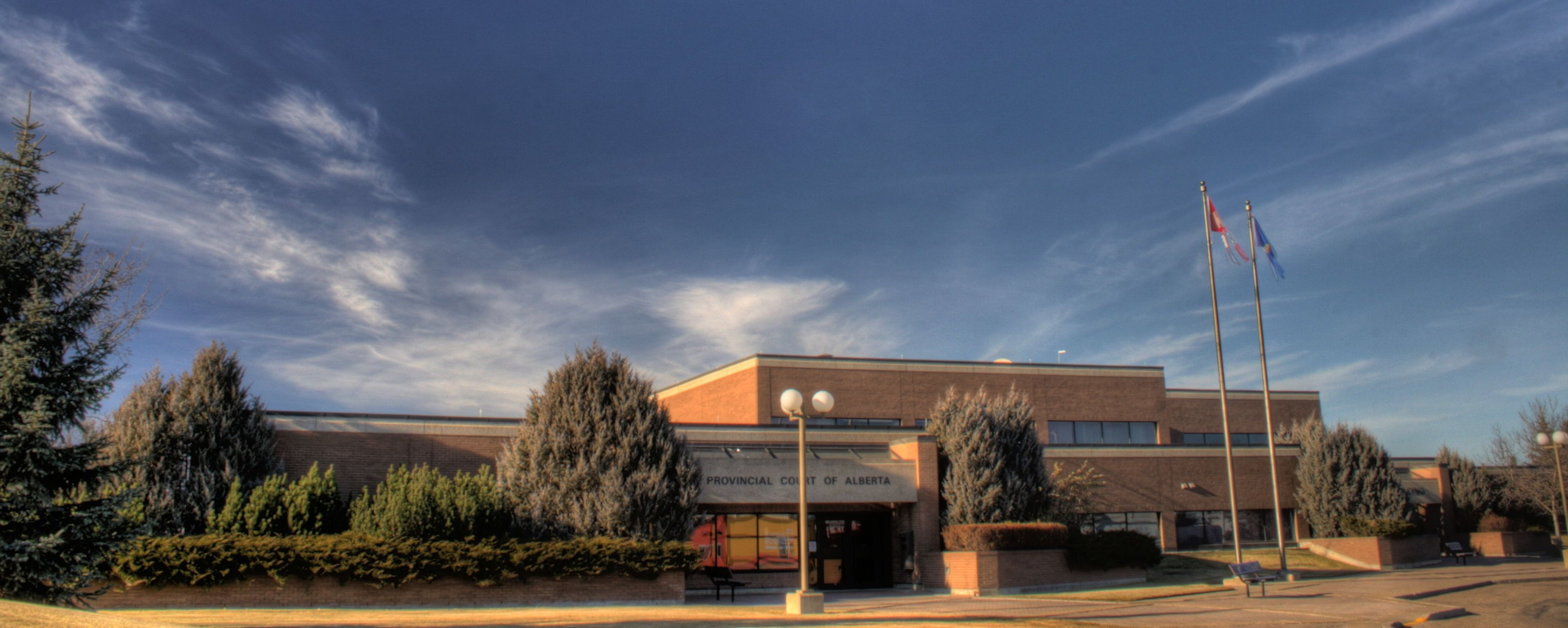
Morinville

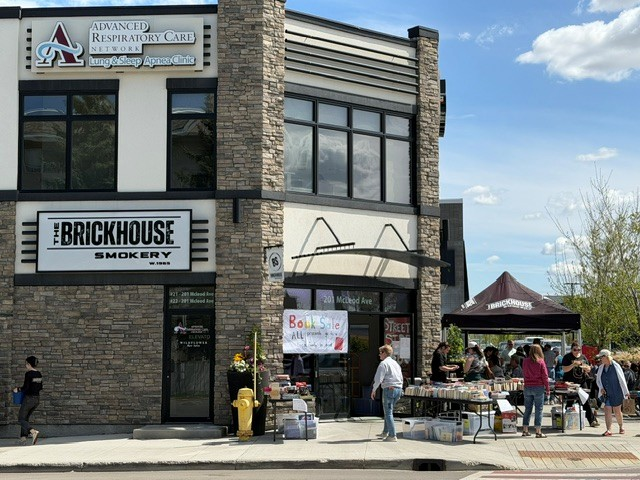
Spruce Grove

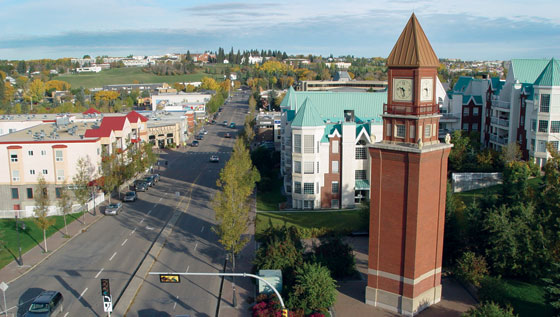
St. Albert

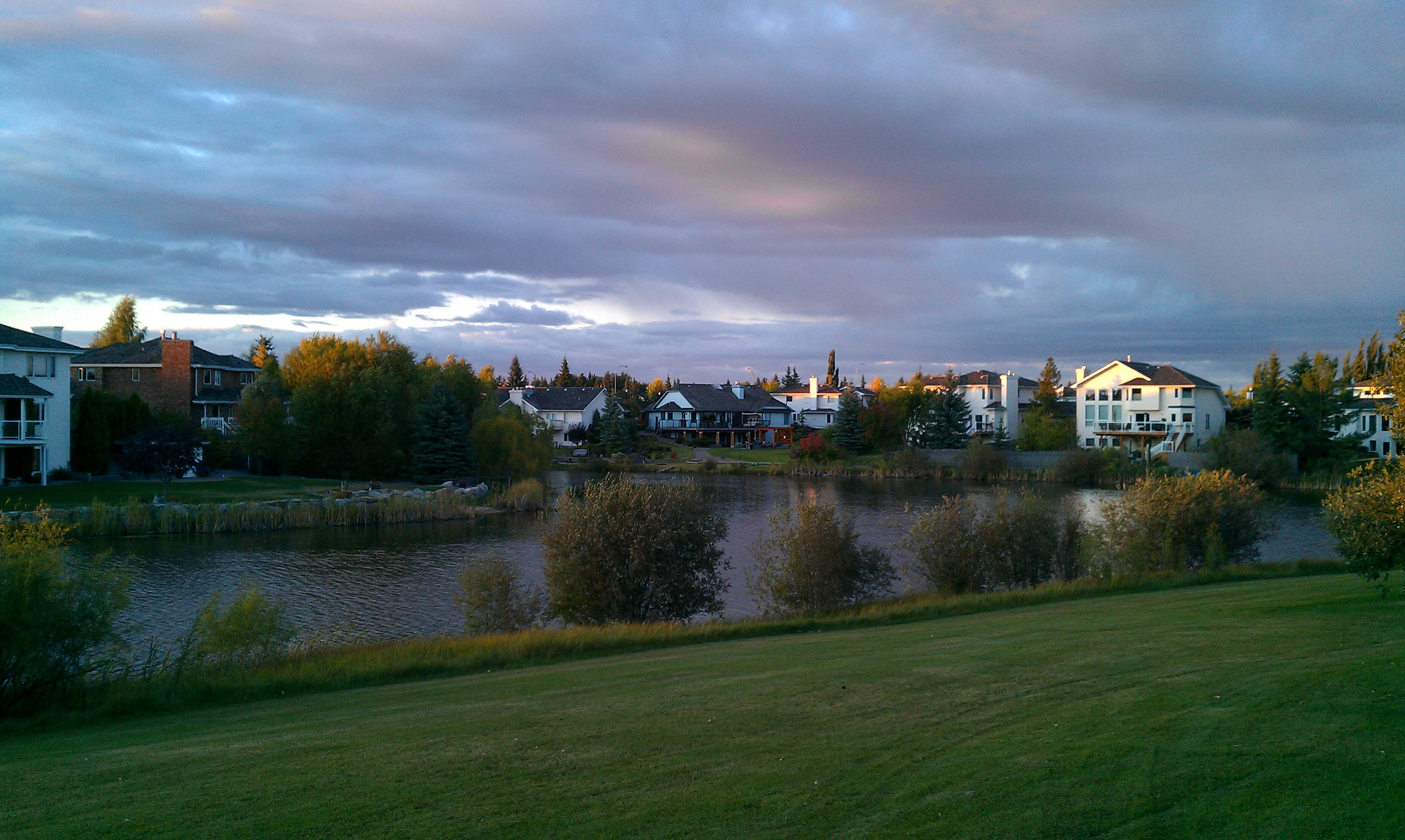
Strathcona County (Sherwood Park)

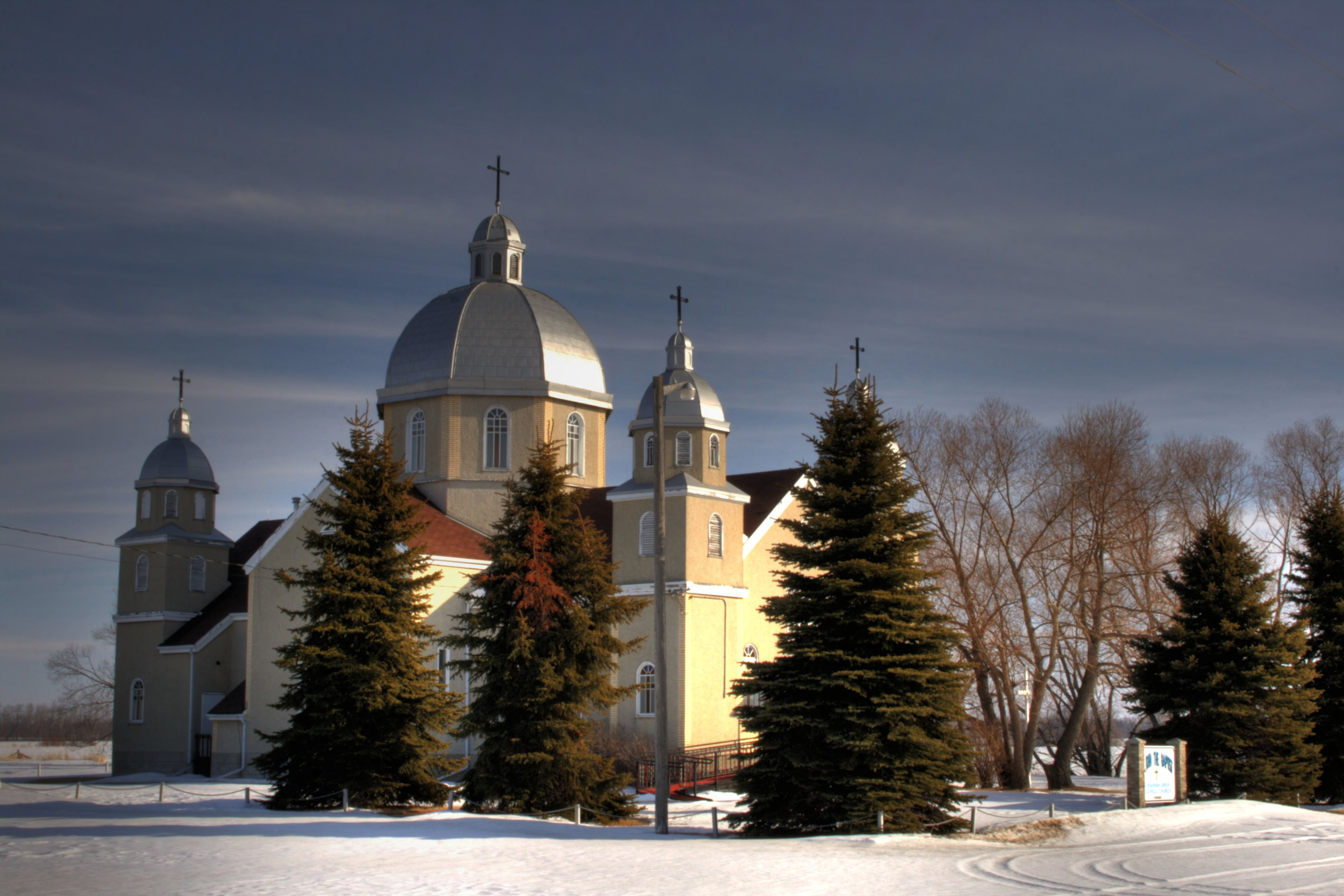
Thorsby

Municipality	Municipal status	Federal census population (2021)	Latest municipal census population (2016-2017)	Latest municipal census year	EMRB member
Alexander 134	Indian reserve	1,077			N
Beaumont	City	20,888	19,236	2019	Y
Betula Beach	Summer village	27			N
Bon Accord	Town	1,461			N
Bruderheim	Town	1,329			N
Calmar	Town	2,183			N
Devon	Town	6,545			Y
Edmonton	City	1,010,899	972,223	2019	Y
Enoch Cree Nation 135	Indian reserve	1,825			N
Fort Saskatchewan	City	27,088	26,942	2019	Y
Gibbons	Town	3,218			N
Golden Days	Summer village	248			N
Itaska Beach	Summer village	30			N
Kapasiwin	Summer village	24			N
Lakeview	Summer village	29			N
Leduc	City	34,094	33,032	2019	Y
Leduc County	Municipal district	14,416			Y
Legal	Town	1,232			N
Morinville	Town	10,385	10,578	2020	Y
Parkland County	Municipal district	32,205			Y
Point Alison	Summer village	18			N
Redwater	Town	2,115			N
Seba Beach	Summer village	229			N
Spring Lake	Village	711			N
Spruce Grove	City	37,645	35,766	2018	Y
St. Albert	City	68,232	66,082	2018	Y
Stony Plain	Town	17,993			Y
Strathcona County	Specialized municipality	99,225			Y
Sturgeon County	Municipal district	20,061			Y
Sundance Beach	Summer village	42			N
Thorsby	Town	967			N
Wabamun 133A and 133B	Indian reserve	1,001			N
Warburg	Village	676			N
Total Edmonton CMA		1,418,118	—	—	—

- Strathcona County's 2021 federal census population of 99,225 includes 72,017 in the Sherwood Park urban service area.
- The combined Wabamun 133A and 133B population of 1,001 includes 981 in Wabamun 133A and 20 in Wabamun 133B.

== Major industrial areas ==
Major industrial areas within the EMR include the northwest, southeast and Clover Bar industrial areas in Edmonton, Nisku Industrial Business Park in Leduc County, Acheson Industrial Area in Parkland County, Refinery Row in Strathcona County, and Alberta's Industrial Heartland spanning portions of Sturgeon County, Strathcona County, Lamont County and Fort Saskatchewan.

At the moment, two more major industrial areas are in the final stages of establishment. The establishment of the Horse Hills industrial area in northeast Edmonton is in the final planning stages, while Edmonton Airports is currently planning its inland port development under the Port Alberta initiative at the Edmonton International Airport within Leduc County.

== See also ==
- Edmonton
- Calgary-Edmonton Corridor
- Calgary Metropolitan Region
