= Leduc County =

Municipal district in Alberta, Canada

- Municipal district
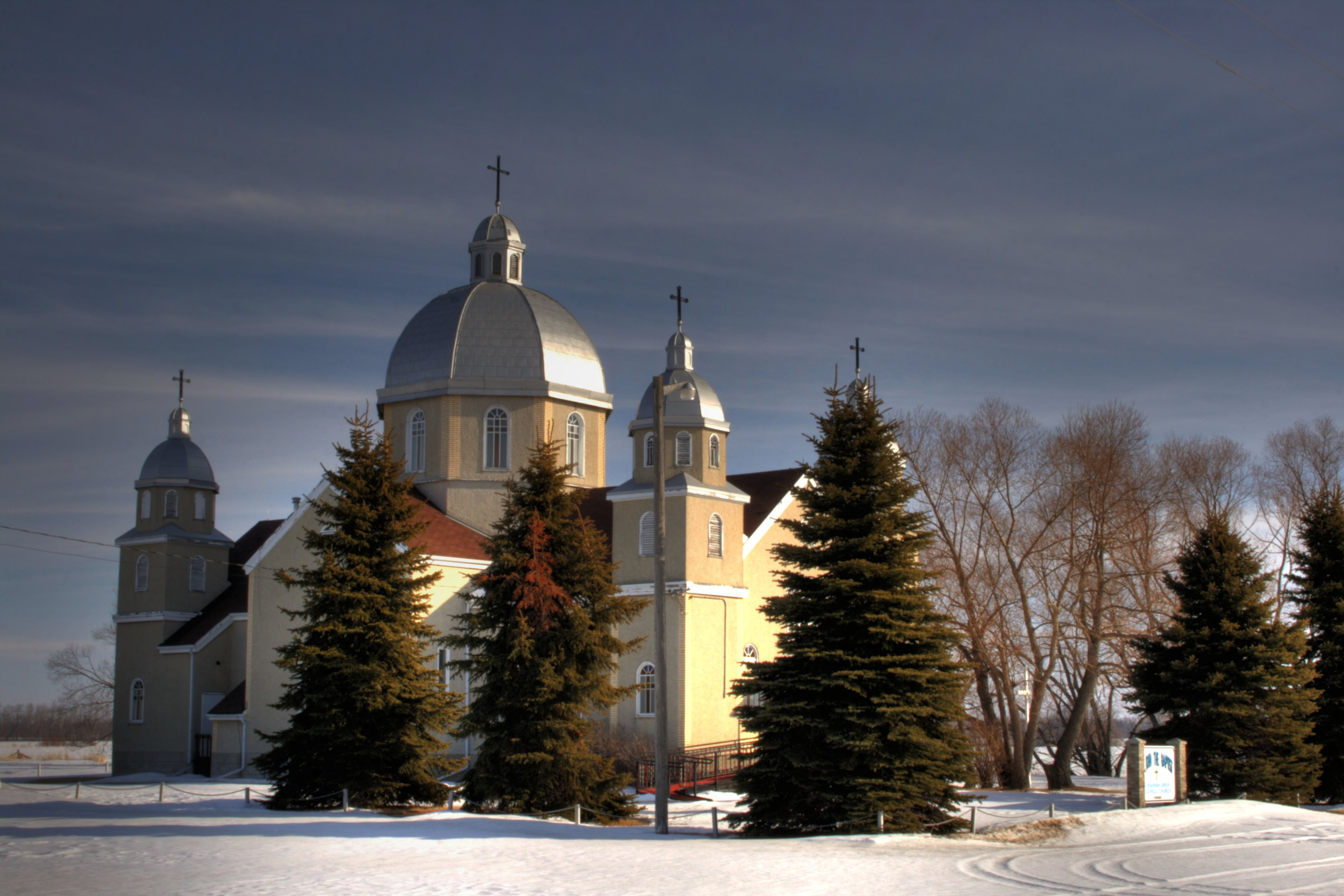
- St John the Baptist Church in Leduc County south of Thorsby

- Flag

- Location within Alberta
- Coordinates: 53°20′16″N 113°31′53″W
- Country: Canada
- Province: Alberta
- Region: Edmonton Metropolitan Region
- Census division: 11
- Established: 1944
- Incorporated: 1964

Government
  - Mayor: Tanni Doblanko
  - Governing body: Leduc County Council: Glenn Belozer; Tanni Doblanko; Kelly-Lynn Lewis; Raymond Scobie; Rick Smith; Kelly Vandenberghe; Larry Wanchuk
  - Manager: Duane Coleman
  - Administrative office: Nisku

Area (2021)
  - Land: 2,502.59 km^{2} (966.26 sq mi)

Population (2021)
  - Total: 14,416
  - Density: 5.8/km^{2} (15/sq mi)
- Time zone: UTC−06:00 (Alberta Time)
- Website: leduc-county.com

Leduc County is a municipal district in Alberta, Canada, that is immediately south of the City of Edmonton. It spans 105 km (65 mi) east to west and 32 km (20 mi) north to south, and has a population of 14,416. The municipal district is home to prairie parkland and several lakes and is home to the Edmonton International Airport, the Nisku Industrial Business Park and the Genesee Generating Station.

== Geography ==
=== Communities and localities ===
The following urban municipalities are surrounded by Leduc County.

Cities

- Beaumont
- Leduc

Towns

- Calmar
- Devon
- Thorsby

Villages

- Warburg

Summer villages

- Golden Days
- Itaska Beach
- Sundance Beach

The following hamlets are located within Leduc County.

Hamlets

- Buford
- Kavanagh
- Looma
- New Sarepta
- Nisku
- Rolly View
- St. Francis
- Sunnybrook
- Telfordville

The following localities are located within Leduc County.

Localities

- Alsike
- Amarillo Park
- Anchor Farms
- Beau Vista North
- Beau Vista South
- Brenda Vista
- Caywood Estates
- Clover Lawn
- Cloverlawn Estates
- Conjuring Creek
- Creekland
- Edda Vista

- Fern Creek
- Fisher Home
- Gateway Estates
- Genesee
- Glen Park
- Goudreau
- Green Acres
- Hazel Grove
- Hilltop Estates
- Huggett
- Ireton

- Kayda Vista
- Keystone
- Linda Vista
- Looma Estates
- Marquis Development
- Michigan Centre
- Mini Vista
- Panorama Acres
- Paterson Park
- Pemburton Hill
- Richdale Estates

- Sandholm Beach
- Scottsdale Estates
- South Looking Lake
- Southwood Park
- Strawberry Hill Estates
- Sunnyville
- Tiebecke Estates
- Treasure Island Estates
- Valley View Acres
- Weed Creek
- Woodvale Park

Other places

- East Vistas (new urban community approved September 28, 2010)

== Demographics ==
In the 2021 Census of Population conducted by Statistics Canada, Leduc County had a population of 14,416 living in 5,295 of its 5,990 total private dwellings, a change of 9.4% from its 2016 population of 13,177. With a land area of 2,502.59 km^{2} (966.26 sq mi), it had a population density of 5.8/km^{2} (14.9/sq mi) in 2021.

In the 2016 Census of Population conducted by Statistics Canada, Leduc County had a population of 13,780 living in 5,101 of its 5,960 total private dwellings, a 2.1% change from its 2011 population of 13,494. With a land area of 2,601.49 km^{2} (1,004.44 sq mi), it had a population density of 5.3/km^{2} (13.7/sq mi) in 2016.

== See also ==
- List of communities in Alberta
- List of municipal districts in Alberta
