= Leduc, Alberta =

City in Canada

Leduc
- City
- City of Leduc
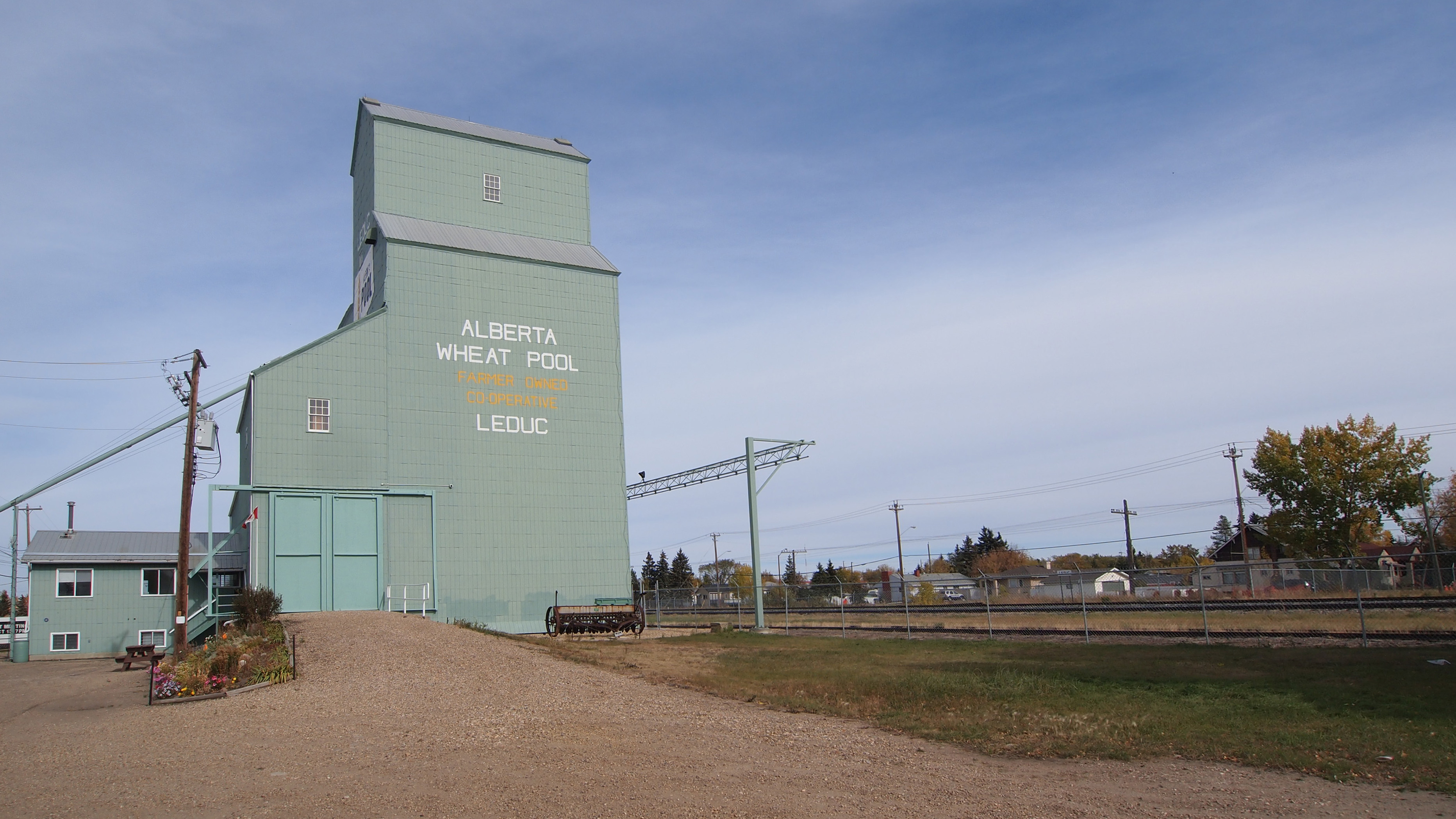
- Leduc Grain Elevator

- Flag Coat of arms Logo
- Motto(s): Integritas Unitas Firmitas (Latin) "Integrity, Unity, Strength"
- City boundaries

- Location in Alberta Location in Canada Location in Leduc County
- Coordinates: 53°15′34″N 113°32′57″W
- Country: Canada
- Province: Alberta
- Region: Edmonton Metropolitan Region
- Municipal district: Leduc County
- Incorporated
  - Village: December 15, 1899
  - Town: December 15, 1906
  - City: September 1, 1983

Government
  - Mayor: Lars Hansen
  - Governing body: Leduc City Council: Brett Baynes; William Cedric Hamilton; Ryley Miller; Shawn Raymond; Jill Spinks; Laura M. Tillack
  - Manager: Derek Prohar, MMV, MSM, CD
  - MP: Mike Lake
  - MLA: Brandon Lunty

Area (2021)
  - Land: 42.25 km^{2} (16.31 sq mi)
- Elevation: 730 m (2,400 ft)

Population (2021)
  - Total: 34,094
  - Density: 806.9/km^{2} (2,090/sq mi)
  - Municipal census ([[2019 Alberta municipal censuses|]2023]): 36,060
  - Estimate (2025): 39,966
- Time zone: UTC−06:00 (Alberta Time)
- Forward sortation area: T9E
- Area codes: 780, 587, 825, 368
- Highways: Highway 2; Highway 2A; Highway 39; Highway 623
- Railways: Canadian Pacific Kansas City
- Public transit: Leduc Transit
- Website: leduc.ca

Leduc (/ləˈduːk/ lə-DEWK) is a city in the province of Alberta, Canada. It is 33 km (21 mi) south of the provincial capital of Edmonton and is part of the Edmonton Metropolitan Region.

== History ==
Leduc was established in 1891 by Robert Telford, a settler who had bought land near a lake which would later bear his name. It was on that piece of land where the new settlement would take root. Telford established a stopping place for the stagecoach line that in 1889 connected Calgary to Edmonton. It became known as Telford's Place. Telford previously served as an officer for the North-West Mounted Police, and later became Leduc's first postmaster, first general merchantman, and first justice of the peace. He was also elected to serve as Leduc's first Member of the Alberta Legislature (MLA) in 1905.

The establishment of the Calgary and Edmonton Railway, later acquired by the Canadian Pacific Railway, opened the region to settlement. The first train stopped at Leduc in July 1891.

Originally there were two versions to describe how Leduc got its name. In fact both accounts are true. In April 1886 when a settler (McKinley) setting up a telegraph office needed a name for the new station and decided that it would be named after the first person who came through the door of the telegraph office. That person was Father Hippolyte Leduc, a priest who had served the area since 1867. Five years later, in 1891, the Minister of the Interior and Superintendent of Indian Affairs, who had been Lieutenant-Governor of the North-West Territories, Edgar Dewdney (1835–1916), was given a list of names, that had been provided to the railroad by Father Lacombe, decided that Telford Place should be renamed at the time the railway terminal was being established. Father Leduc's name was on the list and since the telegraph station was already called Leduc Dewdney saw no reason why not to use Leduc's name for the new railroad station and the hamlet that was growing alongside.

Leduc was incorporated as a village in 1899, and became a town in 1906. It became a city in 1983; by that time its population had reached 12,000.

The town continued to grow quietly over the decades and Alberta's historical oil strike on February 13, 1947, occurred near the town at the Leduc No. 1 oil well.

In summer 2023, the city settled a class action lawsuit filed against it by 155 former female employees for $9,527,500 for alleged workplace sexual and physical assaults, harassment, and bullying since 2002. In January 2024, mayor Bob Young made a public apology as part of the settlement agreement. After losing a fight to keep details on the number of women and payment amount secret, those figures were revealed to the public in May 2025.

== Geography ==
Leduc has a wide variety of parks and sports amenities, and has more than 35 km (21.7 mi) of multiuse pathways. On the east end of the city lies Telford Lake, and just to the east is Saunders Lake.

- Alexandra Park Ponds
- Coady Lake
- Leduc Reservoir
- Telford Lake
- West Point Lake

=== Climate ===
Leduc experiences a humid continental climate (Köppen Dfb) closely bordering on a subarctic climate (Dfc). Summers are typically warm and rainy with cool nights. Winters are typically long, very cold, and very dry with moderate snowfall. Precipitation usually peaks during July, which is also the sunniest month.

Climate data for Leduc-Edmonton (Edmonton International Airport) WMO ID: 71123; coordinates 53°19′N 113°35′W; elevation: 723.3 m (2,373 ft); 1991–2020 normals, extremes 1959–2020
| Month | Jan | Feb | Mar | Apr | May | Jun | Jul | Aug | Sep | Oct | Nov | Dec | Year |
|---|---|---|---|---|---|---|---|---|---|---|---|---|---|
| Record high humidex | 9.2 | 12.8 | 23.5 | 30.0 | 33.6 | 37.3 | 44.0 | 38.7 | 33.9 | 28.4 | 20.8 | 14.6 | 44.0 |
| Record high °C (°F) | 9.9 (49.8) | 13.3 (55.9) | 24.2 (75.6) | 30.5 (86.9) | 32.8 (91.0) | 34.4 (93.9) | 35.0 (95.0) | 35.6 (96.1) | 34.9 (94.8) | 29.1 (84.4) | 18.8 (65.8) | 15.9 (60.6) | 35.6 (96.1) |
| Mean maximum °C (°F) | 7.0 (44.6) | 6.8 (44.2) | 11.3 (52.3) | 22.2 (72.0) | 28.0 (82.4) | 28.1 (82.6) | 29.5 (85.1) | 29.8 (85.6) | 27.7 (81.9) | 21.5 (70.7) | 11.1 (52.0) | 6.3 (43.3) | 31.5 (88.7) |
| Mean daily maximum °C (°F) | −6.5 (20.3) | −4.1 (24.6) | 0.5 (32.9) | 10.1 (50.2) | 17.6 (63.7) | 20.7 (69.3) | 23.0 (73.4) | 22.4 (72.3) | 17.8 (64.0) | 10.0 (50.0) | 0.2 (32.4) | −5.3 (22.5) | 8.9 (48.0) |
| Daily mean °C (°F) | −12.3 (9.9) | −10.4 (13.3) | −5.3 (22.5) | 3.5 (38.3) | 10.1 (50.2) | 14.1 (57.4) | 16.2 (61.2) | 15.1 (59.2) | 10.3 (50.5) | 3.4 (38.1) | −5.2 (22.6) | −11.0 (12.2) | 2.4 (36.3) |
| Mean daily minimum °C (°F) | −18.1 (−0.6) | −16.6 (2.1) | −11.2 (11.8) | −3.2 (26.2) | 2.7 (36.9) | 7.5 (45.5) | 9.4 (48.9) | 7.8 (46.0) | 2.8 (37.0) | −3.3 (26.1) | −10.6 (12.9) | −16.7 (1.9) | −4.1 (24.6) |
| Mean minimum °C (°F) | −35.0 (−31.0) | −30.5 (−22.9) | −28.3 (−18.9) | −13.1 (8.4) | −5.3 (22.5) | 1.4 (34.5) | 3.7 (38.7) | 1.4 (34.5) | −4.4 (24.1) | −12.9 (8.8) | −24.2 (−11.6) | −30.0 (−22.0) | −38.5 (−37.3) |
| Record low °C (°F) | −48.3 (−54.9) | −43.9 (−47.0) | −42.7 (−44.9) | −28.3 (−18.9) | −11.6 (11.1) | −6.1 (21.0) | −1.0 (30.2) | −3.8 (25.2) | −9.6 (14.7) | −26.5 (−15.7) | −36.4 (−33.5) | −46.1 (−51.0) | −48.3 (−54.9) |
| Record low wind chill | −61.1 | −53.5 | −50.7 | −33.7 | −16.3 | −7.3 | −3.9 | −5.8 | −14.3 | −34.9 | −51.5 | −58.3 | −61.1 |
| Average precipitation mm (inches) | 21.5 (0.85) | 12.4 (0.49) | 17.3 (0.68) | 29.8 (1.17) | 47.0 (1.85) | 74.7 (2.94) | 87.2 (3.43) | 52.6 (2.07) | 34.7 (1.37) | 22.3 (0.88) | 20.0 (0.79) | 14.6 (0.57) | 434.0 (17.09) |
| Average rainfall mm (inches) | 1.1 (0.04) | 0.5 (0.02) | 0.8 (0.03) | 14.9 (0.59) | 41.6 (1.64) | 75.2 (2.96) | 88.0 (3.46) | 53.2 (2.09) | 34.5 (1.36) | 12.4 (0.49) | 1.5 (0.06) | 0.5 (0.02) | 324.1 (12.76) |
| Average snowfall cm (inches) | 24.2 (9.5) | 14.4 (5.7) | 19.2 (7.6) | 16.3 (6.4) | 6.4 (2.5) | 0.1 (0.0) | 0.0 (0.0) | 0.1 (0.0) | 0.6 (0.2) | 10.1 (4.0) | 19.1 (7.5) | 16.3 (6.4) | 126.7 (49.9) |
| Average precipitation days (≥ 0.2 mm) | 10.9 | 8.2 | 9.8 | 8.9 | 11.4 | 14.7 | 16.2 | 12.1 | 10.5 | 10.2 | 10.1 | 9.8 | 132.8 |
| Average rainy days (≥ 0.2 mm) | 1.0 | 0.6 | 1.0 | 5.9 | 10.3 | 14.4 | 15.5 | 11.9 | 9.5 | 6.1 | 1.7 | 0.4 | 78.3 |
| Average snowy days (≥ 0.2 cm) | 10.7 | 8.5 | 8.5 | 4.4 | 1.8 | 0.04 | 0.0 | 0.04 | 0.29 | 3.4 | 7.7 | 9.3 | 54.7 |
| Average relative humidity (%) (at 1500 LST) | 69.7 | 66.7 | 62.8 | 46.9 | 40.1 | 49.9 | 54.5 | 51.9 | 48.4 | 52.3 | 67.9 | 70.2 | 56.8 |
| Average dew point °C (°F) | −15.7 (3.7) | −13.9 (7.0) | −9.3 (15.3) | −3.5 (25.7) | 1.1 (34.0) | 7.6 (45.7) | 11.2 (52.2) | 10.0 (50.0) | 4.3 (39.7) | −2.1 (28.2) | −8.6 (16.5) | −14.3 (6.3) | −2.8 (27.0) |
| Mean monthly sunshine hours | 101.1 | 127.0 | 174.7 | 233.3 | 271.0 | 275.9 | 302.2 | 279.4 | 196.1 | 160.4 | 97.2 | 92.0 | 2,310.3 |
| Percentage possible sunshine | 40.1 | 45.9 | 47.6 | 55.7 | 55.1 | 54.4 | 59.3 | 61.0 | 51.3 | 48.7 | 37.3 | 39.0 | 49.6 |
Source 1: Environment and Climate Change Canada
Source 2: weatherstats.ca (for dewpoint and monthly/yearly average absolute maximum/minimum temperature)

== Demographics ==
Federal census population history
| Year | Pop. | ±% |
|---|---|---|
| 1901 | 112 | — |
| 1906 | 391 | +249.1% |
| 1911 | 523 | +33.8% |
| 1916 | 584 | +11.7% |
| 1921 | 756 | +29.5% |
| 1926 | 832 | +10.1% |
| 1931 | 900 | +8.2% |
| 1936 | 926 | +2.9% |
| 1941 | 871 | −5.9% |
| 1946 | 920 | +5.6% |
| 1951 | 1,842 | +100.2% |
| 1956 | 2,008 | +9.0% |
| 1961 | 2,356 | +17.3% |
| 1966 | 2,856 | +21.2% |
| 1971 | 4,000 | +40.1% |
| 1976 | 8,576 | +114.4% |
| 1981 | 12,471 | +45.4% |
| 1986 | 13,126 | +5.3% |
| 1991 | 13,970 | +6.4% |
| 1996 | 14,305 | +2.4% |
| 2001 | 15,032 | +5.1% |
| 2006 | 16,967 | +12.9% |
| 2011 | 24,279 | +43.1% |
| 2016 | 29,993 | +23.5% |
| 2021 | 34,094 | +13.7% |
Source: Statistics Canada

In the 2021 Census of Population conducted by Statistics Canada, the City of Leduc had a population of 34,094 living in 12,964 of its 13,507 total private dwellings, a change of 13.7% from its 2016 population of 29,993. With a land area of 42.25 km^{2} (16.31 sq mi), it had a population density of 807.0/km^{2} (2,090.0/sq mi) in 2021.

The population of the City of Leduc according to its 2019 municipal census is 33,032, a change of 1.8% from its 2018 municipal census population of 32,448.

In the 2016 Census of Population conducted by Statistics Canada, the City of Leduc had a population of 29,993 living in 11,319 of its 12,264 total private dwellings, an increase of 23.4% from its 2011 population of 24,304. With a land area of 42.44 km^{2} (16.39 sq mi), it had a population density of 706.7/km^{2} (1,830.4/sq mi) in 2016. Results from the 2017 Leduc Census revealed a new population count of 31,130, a growth rate of two percent over 2016.

=== Ethnicity ===
Panethnic groups in the City of Leduc (2001−2021)
| Panethnic group | 2021 | | 2016 | | 2011 | | 2006 | | 2001 | |
| Panethnic group | Pop. | % | Pop. | % | Pop. | % | Pop. | % | Pop. | % |
|---|---|---|---|---|---|---|---|---|---|---|
| European (Note: Statistic includes all persons that did not make up part of a visible minority or an indigenous identity.) | 27,040 | 80.33% | 25,185 | 84.94% | 21,490 | 89.21% | 15,905 | 94.79% | 14,030 | 94.99% |
| Indigenous | 2,345 | 6.97% | 1,615 | 5.45% | 1,140 | 4.73% | 500 | 2.98% | 460 | 3.11% |
| Southeast Asian (Note: Statistic includes total responses of "Filipino" and "Southeast Asian" under visible minority section on census.) | 2,065 | 6.13% | 1,275 | 4.3% | 600 | 2.49% | 140 | 0.83% | 40 | 0.27% |
| South Asian | 680 | 2.02% | 450 | 1.52% | 265 | 1.1% | 65 | 0.39% | 15 | 0.1% |
| African | 635 | 1.89% | 570 | 1.92% | 280 | 1.16% | 70 | 0.42% | 155 | 1.05% |
| Latin American | 340 | 1.01% | 70 | 0.24% | 10 | 0.04% | 0 | 0% | 0 | 0% |
| East Asian (Note: Statistic includes total responses of "Chinese", "Korean", and "Japanese" under visible minority section on census.) | 250 | 0.74% | 240 | 0.81% | 140 | 0.58% | 60 | 0.36% | 30 | 0.2% |
| Middle Eastern (Note: Statistic includes total responses of "West Asian" and "Arab" under visible minority section on census.) | 125 | 0.37% | 210 | 0.71% | 85 | 0.35% | 35 | 0.21% | 40 | 0.27% |
| Other/multiracial (Note: Statistic includes total responses of "Visible minority, n.i.e." and "Multiple visible minorities" under visible minority section on census.) | 170 | 0.51% | 25 | 0.08% | 50 | 0.21% | 0 | 0% | 10 | 0.07% |
| Total responses | 33,660 | 98.73% | 29,650 | 98.86% | 24,090 | 99.12% | 16,780 | 98.9% | 14,770 | 98.26% |
| Total population | 34,094 | 100% | 29,993 | 100% | 24,304 | 100% | 16,967 | 100% | 15,032 | 100% |
Note: Totals greater than 100% due to multiple origin responses

== Economy ==
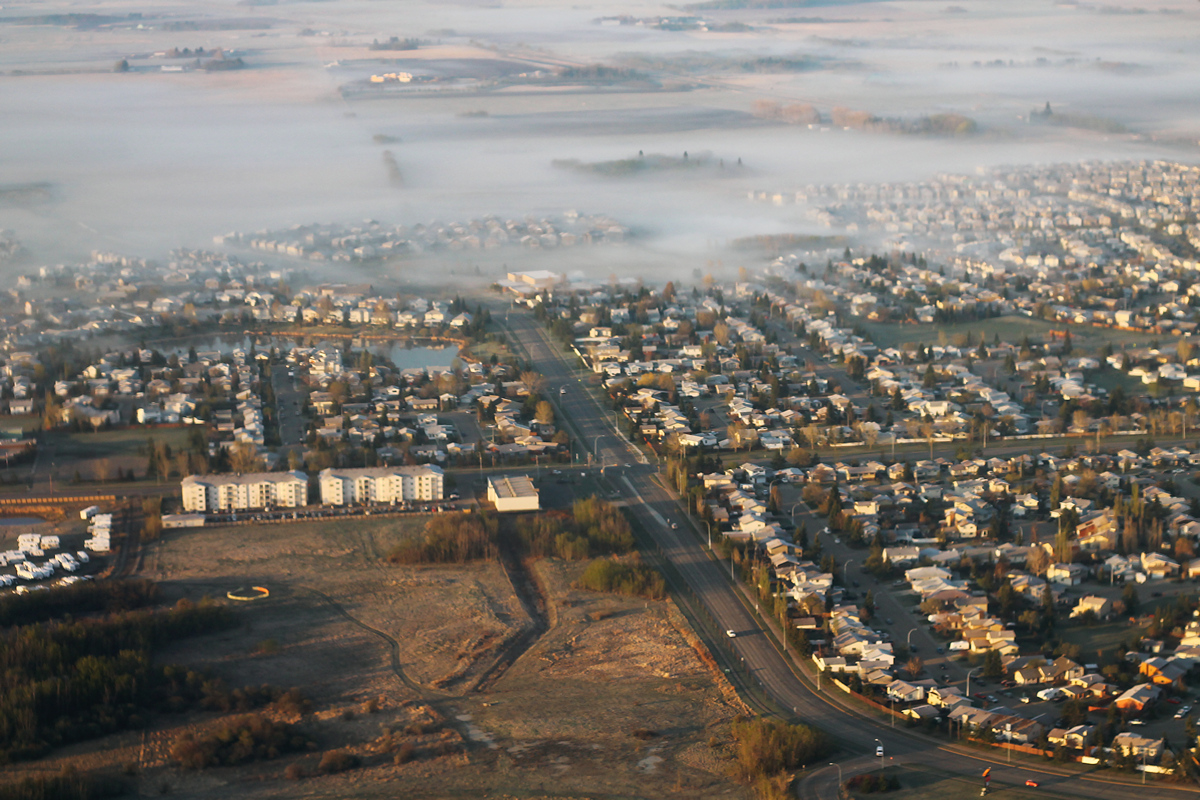
Aerial view of Leduc on a foggy morning

The City of Leduc is a founding member of the Leduc-Nisku Economic Development Association, an economic development partnership that markets Alberta's International Region in proximity to the Edmonton International Airport. The city forms part of this international transportation and economic region. It is on the CANAMEX Trade Corridor at the intersection of two Canadian Pacific Kansas City lines and is adjacent to the Edmonton International Airport. These transportation links support the petrochemical activities in Alberta's Industrial Heartland, the Fort McMurray area, and other economic hubs.

The oil and gas industry has long been the base of Leduc's economy. The Leduc Business Park, in the northern portion of the city, contains more than 1,400 businesses. The Nisku Industrial Park, located to the north within Leduc County, also contains many businesses.

== Arts and culture ==
Leduc is home to the Maclab Centre for the Performing Arts, a preeminent performing arts facility with a 460-seat theatre.

In fall 2009, the Leduc Recreation Centre was opened. The 309,000 ft^{2} (28,700 m^{2}) facility includes three NHL-sized arenas, an aquatic centre, an 8 sheet curling rink, twin multi use field houses, a 9,000 sq ft (840 m^{2}) fitness center and 4 lane running track, restaurants, child care facilities, several conference rooms, and the outreach learning centre. In 2022, Curling Stadium Leduc opened inside the Leduc Curling Club, offering live broadcasts from all games played.

Adjacent to the LRC is William F. Lede park. The 200-acre park has a variety of amenities including; 7 baseball diamonds, beach volleyball courts, a soccer pitch, twin rugby fields and clubhouse, 2 U-12 soccer fields, community gardens, a 40-acre off-leash dog park as well as access to 8 km of multi-way trails looping around Telford Lake. Neighbouring the rugby house is the Leduc Boat Club, in 2004 the club developed Telford Lake for rowing sports as it hosted the 2005 World Masters Games.

== Media ==
Local newspaper, the Leduc Representative (the Leduc Rep), and the regional newspaper, the Leduc-Wetaskiwin Pipestone Flyer, serve Leduc.

Leduc's first FM radio station, CJLD-FM, began in 2013 and is known on-air as "93.1 The One".

An internet-based community radio station, branded "Leduc Radio" since 2008, also serves the city.

Due to its proximity to Edmonton, all major Edmonton media (print, radio and television) also serve Leduc and its surrounding area.

== Emergency services ==
The City of Leduc has its own fire services and emergency management departments. Led currently by fire chief and director of emergency management Bryan Singleton, the Fire Services Department comprises full and part-time members providing fire, ambulance and patient transportation services to the city and portions of Leduc County to the west, south and east.

The Royal Canadian Mounted Police (RCMP) provide police services, supported by the city's Enforcement Services Department, which consists of Peace Officers appointed by the Alberta Solicitor General.

== See also ==
- Leduc Public Library
- List of communities in Alberta
- List of cities in Alberta
