= Hoadley =

Hoadley is a surname. Notable people with the surname include:

- Abel Hoadley (1844–1918), Australian confectioner
- Benjamin Hoadley (1676-1761), English clergyman
- Charles Hoadley (1887–1947), Australian geologist, Antarctic explorer and Scout Leader
- David Hoadley, various people
- George Hoadley, various people
- Jon Hoadley (born 1983), American politician
- Joseph H. Hoadley (born 1863), American financier
- Katherine A. Hoadley, American breast cancer researcher
- Mike Hoadley, American politician
- Phil Hoadley (born 1952), English footballer
- R. Bruce Hoadley (1933–2019), American wood scientist
- Rob Hoadley (born 1980), English rugby player
- Silas Hoadley (1786–1870), American clockmaker
- Simon Hoadley (born 1956), English cricketer
- Stephen Hoadley (born 1955), English cricketer

== See also ==
- Hoadley, Alberta, hamlet
- Hoadley, Wisconsin, former village
- Cape Hoadley, Antarctica
- Hoadly, surname
