= Alberta Highway 20 =

Highway in Alberta

Highway 20
- Highway 20 highlighted in red and Highway 20A highlighted in blue

Route information
- Maintained by the Ministry of Transportation and Economic Corridors
- Length: 110.2 km (68.5 mi)

Major junctions
- South end: Highway 11 near Sylvan Lake
- Highway 11A in Sylvan Lake; Highway 12 in Bentley; Highway 53 in Rimbey; Highway 13 at Winfield
- North end: Highway 39 at Alsike

Location
- Country: Canada
- Province: Alberta
- Specialized and rural municipalities: Red Deer County, Lacombe County, Ponoka County, Wetaskiwin No. 10 County, Brazeau County
- Towns: Sylvan Lake, Bentley, Rimbey
- Villages: Breton

Highway system
- Alberta Provincial Highway Network; List; Former
← Highway 19	→ Highway 21

Highway 20 is a highway in central Alberta, Canada, west of Highway 2.

== Route description ==
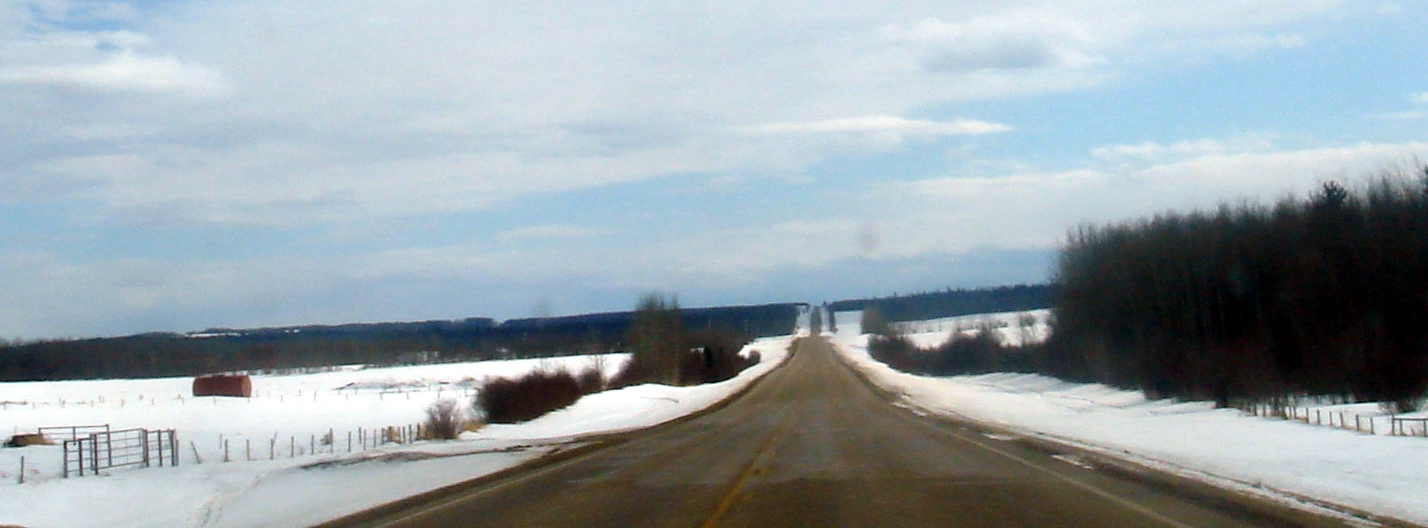
Highway 20 southbound between Breton and Rimbey

Highway 20 begins Highway 11 and travels north for 4 km (2 mi) along the east side of the town of Sylvan Lake to a roundabout with Highway 11A. It continues for 16 km (10 mi) to Highway 12 in Bentley, passing the southeastern shore of Sylvan Lake at Jarvis Bay as well as the Jarvis Bay Provincial Park. It intersects Highway 771 2 km (1 mi) north of Bentley, which provides access to the west side of Gull Lake and Parkland Beach, and travels for 21 km (13 mi) in a northwesterly direction to Rimbey; Highway 20 bypasses Rimbey while Highway 20A is a business route through the town and connects with Highway 53 west. Highway 20 proceeds another 3 km (2 mi) before reconnecting with Highway 20A, and travels another 2 km (1 mi) to Highway 53 east, where it heads east towards Ponoka.

Highway 20 continues north for 9 km (6 mi) to Bluffton where Highway 607 branches off to the west, another 13 km (8 mi) north to Hoadley where Highway 611 branches off to the east, and another 15 km (9 mi) north to Winfield where it crosses Highway 13. From Winfield, the highway continues north for 17 km (11 mi) to Breton where it crosses Highway 616 before it travels another 17 km (11 mi) north Alsike where it ends at Highway 39.

== History ==
Highway 20 was originally a short, 16 km (10 mi) long highway that ran from Highway 11 in Sylvan Lake to the Highway 12 / Highway 51 intersection in Bentley. From this intersection, Highway 12 continued north to Rimbey, Breton, and Alsike. In the mid-1980s, when Highway 11 was realigned to bypass Sylvan Lake, Highway 20 was extended 4 km (2 mi) to the south to connect with the new alignment. In January 1988, the 90 km (56 mi) section of Highway 12 between Bentley and Alsike was redesignated as Highway 20, while Highway 51 was decommissioned and redesignated as the new western section of Highway 12.

== Major intersections ==
From south to north:

Rural/specialized municipality	Location	km	mi	Destinations	Notes
Sylvan Lake		0.0	0.0	Highway 11 – Rocky Mountain House, Red Deer	Highway 20 southern terminus
Sylvan Lake		4.1	2.5	Highway 11A east / Lakeshore Drive – Red Deer	Roundabout
Red Deer County	No major junctions				
↑ / ↓	Jarvis Bay	7.3	4.5	PAR 124 west (Township Road 392) – Jarvis Bay Provincial Park	
Lacombe County		10.7	6.6	Aspelund Road (Township Road 394) – Blackfalds	
Lacombe County	Bentley	20.3	12.6	Highway 12 – Rocky Mountain House, Lacombe	Former Highway 51 west; former Highway 20 northern terminus
Lacombe County		22.3	13.9	Highway 771 north – Parkland Beach	
Ponoka County	Rimbey	42.8	26.6	Highway 53 west (50 Avenue)	
Ponoka County	Rimbey	45.4	28.2	Highway 20A south (51 Street)	
Ponoka County		47.0	29.2	Highway 53 east – Ponoka	
Ponoka County		53.9	33.5	Highway 607 west	
Ponoka County	Bluffton	56.1	34.9	UAR 165 north	
Ponoka County	Hoadley	69.2	43.0	Highway 611 east – Maskwacis	
County of Wetaskiwin No. 10	Winfield	83.7	52.0	Highway 13 – Alder Flats, Wetaskiwin	
Brazeau County	Breton	100.7	62.6	Highway 616 – Buck Creek, Mulhurst	
Brazeau County	Alsike	110.2	68.5	Highway 39 – Drayton Valley, Leduc	Highway 20 northern terminus
1.000 mi = 1.609 km; 1.000 km = 0.621 mi

== Highway 20A ==
Highway 20A
- Location: Rimbey
- Length: 1.6 km (0.99 mi)

Highway 20A is the designation of an alternate route off Highway 20 serving the Town of Rimbey. It starts within Rimbey at Highway 53 and ends 1.6 km (1.0 mi) to the north at Highway 20.

=== Major intersections ===
The entire route is in Rimbey.

km	mi	Destinations	Notes
0.0	0.0	Highway 53 (50 Avenue) to Highway 20 south / 51 Street	Highway 20A southern terminus; most direct continuation of Highway 53 follows Highway 20A north, officially Highway 53 continues east on 50 Avenue
1.6	0.99	Highway 20 to Highway 53 east – Breton, Ponoka	Highway 20A northern terminus
1.000 mi = 1.609 km; 1.000 km = 0.621 mi
