= Ponoka =

Ponoka may refer to:

- Ponoka, Alberta, a town in Canada
- Ponoka County, a municipal district in Alberta, Canada
- Ponoka (provincial electoral district)
