= Cynthia, Alberta =

Cynthia
- Hamlet
- Location of Cynthia Cynthia (Canada)
- Coordinates: 53°16′58″N 115°25′22″W
- Country: Canada
- Province: Alberta
- Region: Central Alberta
- Census division: 11
- Municipal district: Brazeau County

Government
  - Type: Unincorporated
  - Governing body: Brazeau County Council
- Elevation: 923 m (3,028 ft)

Population (2005)
  - Total: 50
- Time zone: UTC−06:00 (Alberta Time)
- Area codes: 780, 587, 825

Cynthia is a hamlet in central Alberta, Canada within Brazeau County. It is located approximately 37 kilometres (23 mi) south of Highway 16 and 131 kilometres (81 mi) southwest of Edmonton.

Cynthia previously held new town status for almost three years, having incorporated as a new town on June 1, 1956, but dissolving on May 1, 1959.

== Demographics ==
The population of Cynthia according to the 2005 municipal census conducted by Brazeau County is 50.

== See also ==
- List of communities in Alberta
- List of former urban municipalities in Alberta
- List of hamlets in Alberta
