= Bluffton, Alberta =

Bluffton
- Hamlet
- Location of Bluffton Bluffton (Canada)
- Coordinates: 52°44′58″N 114°17′30″W
- Country: Canada
- Province: Alberta
- Region: Edmonton Metropolitan Region
- Census division: 11
- Municipal district: Ponoka County

Government
  - Type: Unincorporated
  - Governing body: Ponoka County Council

Area (2021)
  - Land: 0.5 km^{2} (0.19 sq mi)

Population (2021)
  - Total: 140
  - Density: 282.4/km^{2} (731/sq mi)
- Time zone: UTC−06:00 (Alberta Time)
- Area codes: 403, 587, 825

Bluffton is a hamlet in central Alberta, Canada within Ponoka County. It is located 1 kilometre (0.62 mi) northeast of Highway 20, approximately 97 kilometres (60 mi) northwest of Red Deer.

== History ==
In 1961, Bluffton was home to a Montalbetti pasta factory, which produced 3500-4000 pounds of spaghetti, macaroni, and vermicelli per day.^{[3]} The factory produced roughly one million pounds of pasta per year, and was sold throughout Alberta and Saskatchewan. The factory, which opened in November 1961, existed until at least 1963, but no longer exists today. The oil and gas industry is a large part of the economy in and around Bluffton.

== Demographics ==
Population history of Bluffton
Year	Pop.	±%
1941	84	—
1951	89	+6.0%
1956	110	+23.6%
1961	115	+4.5%
1966	77	−33.0%
1971	98	+27.3%
1976	112	+14.3%
1981	152	+35.7%
1986	141	−7.2%
1991	129	−8.5%
1991A	130	+0.8%
1996	144	+10.8%
2001	127	−11.8%
2006	146	+15.0%
2011	152	+4.1%
2016	143	−5.9%
2021	140	−2.1%
Source: Statistics Canada

In the 2021 Census of Population conducted by Statistics Canada, Bluffton had a population of 140 living in 59 of its 66 total private dwellings, a change of −2.1% from its 2016 population of 143. With a land area of 0.5 km^{2} (0.19 sq mi), it had a population density of 280.0/km^{2} (725.2/sq mi) in 2021.

As a designated place in the 2016 Census of Population conducted by Statistics Canada, Bluffton had a population of 143 living in 60 of its 63 total private dwellings, a change of −5.9% from its 2011 population of 152. With a land area of 0.5 km^{2} (0.19 sq mi), it had a population density of 286.0/km^{2} (740.7/sq mi) in 2016.

== See also ==
- List of communities in Alberta
- List of designated places in Alberta
- List of hamlets in Alberta
