= Winfield, Alberta =

Community in Alberta, Canada

Winfield
- Hamlet
- Location of Winfield in Alberta
- Coordinates: 52°57′55″N 114°25′23″W
- Country: Canada
- Province: Alberta
- Region: Central Alberta
- Census division: 11
- Municipal district: County of Wetaskiwin No. 10

Government
  - Type: Unincorporated
  - Reeve: Kathy Rooyakkers
  - Governing body: County of Wetaskiwin Council: Garry Dearing; Pearl Hay; Keith Johnson; Larry McKeever; Kathy Rooyakkers; Lyle Seely; Terry Van De Kraats

Area (2021)
  - Land: 1.07 km^{2} (0.41 sq mi)
- Elevation: 926 m (3,038 ft)

Population (2021)
  - Total: 193
  - Density: 180.5/km^{2} (467/sq mi)
- Time zone: UTC−06:00 (Alberta Time)
- Postal code span: T0C
- Area codes: +1-780, +1-587
- Highways: Alberta Highway 13
- Highway: Alberta Highway 20
- Website: Wetaskiwin County

Winfield is a hamlet in Alberta, Canada within the County of Wetaskiwin No. 10. It is located at the intersection of Highway 13 and Highway 20, approximately 70 kilometres (43 mi) west of Wetaskiwin.

== Climate ==
Winfield experiences a subarctic climate (Köppen climate classification Dfc) that borders on a humid continental climate (Dfb) The average January temperature is −9.1 °C (15.6 °F), while the average July temperature is 15.5 °C (59.9 °F). However, temperatures as low as −44.5 °C (−48 °F) and as high as 34.0 °C (93 °F) have been recorded. Winters are cold and dry with a snow pack from mid-November till early-April. Summers are warm with long days; most precipitation falls during summer as rain from thunderstorms. July has the most precipitation of any month with an average of 131.1 millimetres (5 in) as rain.

Climate data for Winfield, Alberta
Month	Jan	Feb	Mar	Apr	May	Jun	Jul	Aug	Sep	Oct	Nov	Dec	Year
Record high °C (°F)	17.0 (62.6)	17.0 (62.6)	23.5 (74.3)	28.5 (83.3)	31.0 (87.8)	33.0 (91.4)	34.0 (93.2)	32.5 (90.5)	32.5 (90.5)	28.5 (83.3)	20.0 (68.0)	17.5 (63.5)	34.0 (93.2)
Mean daily maximum °C (°F)	−3.5 (25.7)	−0.6 (30.9)	2.9 (37.2)	10.5 (50.9)	16.0 (60.8)	19.2 (66.6)	21.7 (71.1)	21.2 (70.2)	16.1 (61.0)	10.3 (50.5)	1.5 (34.7)	−2.5 (27.5)	9.4 (48.9)
Daily mean °C (°F)	−9.1 (15.6)	−6.5 (20.3)	−2.8 (27.0)	4.2 (39.6)	9.3 (48.7)	13.1 (55.6)	15.5 (59.9)	14.6 (58.3)	9.8 (49.6)	4.4 (39.9)	−3.6 (25.5)	−7.7 (18.1)	3.4 (38.1)
Mean daily minimum °C (°F)	−14.6 (5.7)	−12.3 (9.9)	−8.4 (16.9)	−2.1 (28.2)	2.7 (36.9)	6.8 (44.2)	9.1 (48.4)	8.0 (46.4)	3.4 (38.1)	−1.6 (29.1)	−8.6 (16.5)	−13 (9)	−2.5 (27.5)
Record low °C (°F)	−43.0 (−45.4)	−40 (−40)	−39 (−38)	−26.0 (−14.8)	−13.0 (8.6)	−2.8 (27.0)	0.0 (32.0)	−4.0 (24.8)	−7.5 (18.5)	−26.5 (−15.7)	−37.0 (−34.6)	−44.5 (−48.1)	−44.5 (−48.1)
Average precipitation mm (inches)	22.8 (0.90)	17.2 (0.68)	23.0 (0.91)	27.4 (1.08)	65.1 (2.56)	102.5 (4.04)	131.1 (5.16)	85.5 (3.37)	62.3 (2.45)	28.8 (1.13)	19.6 (0.77)	17.0 (0.67)	602.3 (23.71)
Average rainfall mm (inches)	1.2 (0.05)	0.1 (0.00)	1.4 (0.06)	17.4 (0.69)	57.6 (2.27)	102.5 (4.04)	131.1 (5.16)	85.5 (3.37)	60.4 (2.38)	19.0 (0.75)	2.0 (0.08)	0.4 (0.02)	478.6 (18.84)
Average snowfall cm (inches)	22.1 (8.7)	17.1 (6.7)	21.6 (8.5)	10.1 (4.0)	7.4 (2.9)	0.0 (0.0)	0.0 (0.0)	0.0 (0.0)	1.9 (0.7)	9.8 (3.9)	17.7 (7.0)	16.6 (6.5)	124.2 (48.9)
Source: Environment Canada

== Demographics ==
Population history of Winfield
Year	Pop.	±%
1951	452	—
1956	355	−21.5%
1961	238	−33.0%
1966	226	−5.0%
1971	209	−7.5%
1976	206	−1.4%
1981	183	−11.2%
1986	231	+26.2%
1991	198	−14.3%
1991A	199	+0.5%
1996	226	+13.6%
2001	236	+4.4%
2006	249	+5.5%
2011	224	−10.0%
2016	238	+6.2%
2021	193	−18.9%
Source: Statistics Canada

In the 2021 Census of Population conducted by Statistics Canada, Winfield had a population of 193 living in 85 of its 96 total private dwellings, a change of −18.9% from its 2016 population of 238. With a land area of 1.07 km^{2} (0.41 sq mi), it had a population density of 180.4/km^{2} (467.2/sq mi) in 2021.

As a designated place in the 2016 Census of Population conducted by Statistics Canada, Winfield had a population of 238 living in 85 of its 98 total private dwellings, a change of 6.3% from its 2011 population of 224. With a land area of 1.07 km^{2} (0.41 sq mi), it had a population density of 222.4/km^{2} (576.1/sq mi) in 2016.

== See also ==
- List of communities in Alberta
- List of designated places in Alberta
- List of hamlets in Alberta
