= Leedale =

- Hamlet
- Location of Leedale Leedale (Canada)
- Coordinates: 52°34′55″N 114°28′11″W
- Country: Canada
- Province: Alberta
- Region: Central Alberta
- Census division: 8
- Municipal district: Ponoka County

Government
  - Type: Unincorporated
  - Governing body: Ponoka County Council

Population (1991)
  - Total: 11
- Time zone: UTC−06:00 (Alberta Time)
- Area codes: 403, 587, 825

Leedale is a hamlet in central Alberta, Canada within Ponoka County. It is located 6 kilometres (3.7 mi) south of Highway 53, approximately 59 kilometres (37 mi) northwest of Red Deer, on the Medicine River.

== Demographics ==
Leedale recorded a population of 11 in the 1991 Census of Population conducted by Statistics Canada.

== See also ==
- List of communities in Alberta
- List of hamlets in Alberta
