= List of towns in Alberta =

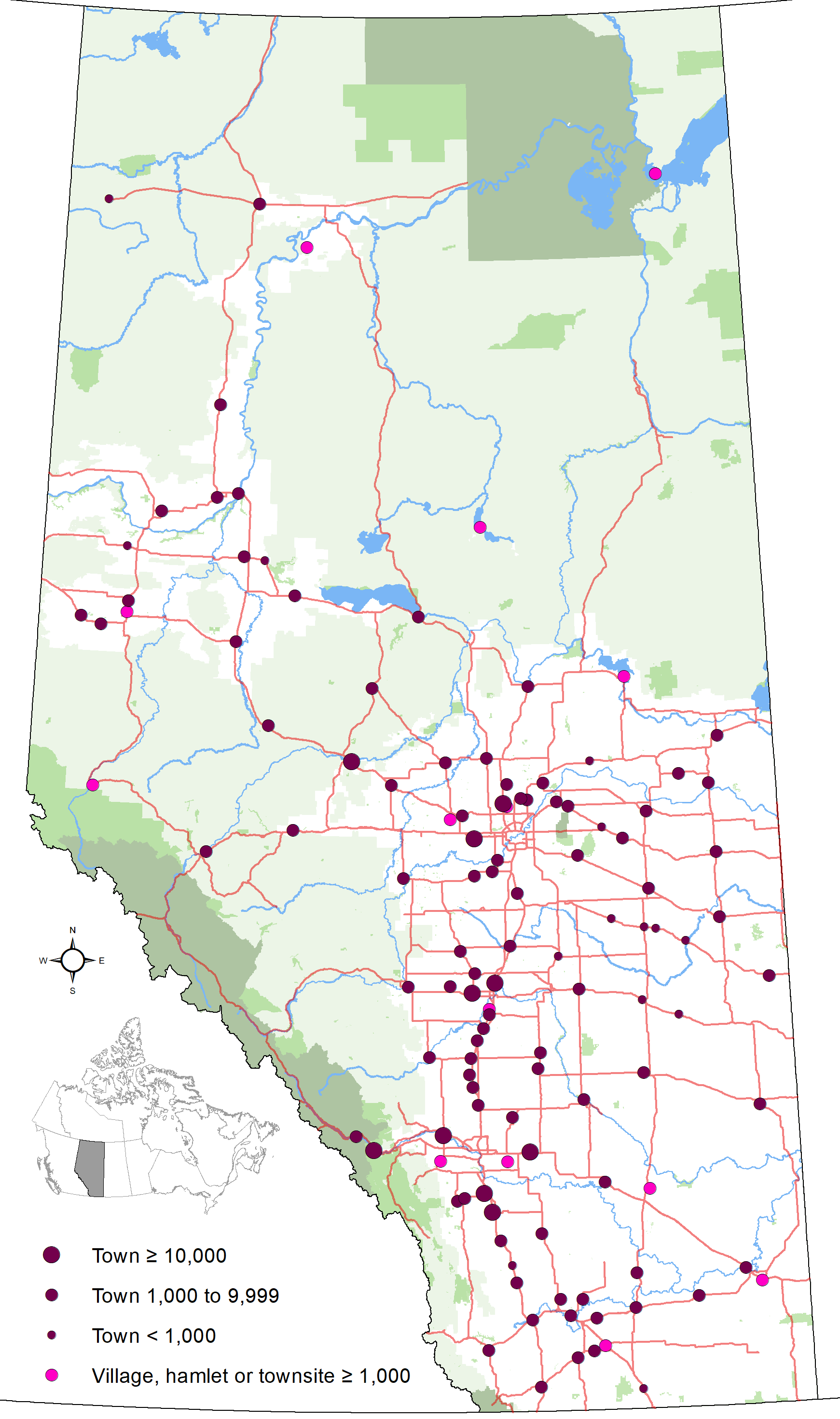
Distribution of Alberta's 105 towns and 13 other communities that meet the legislated population requirements for town status

A town is an urban municipality status type used in the Canadian province of Alberta. Alberta towns are created when communities with populations of at least 1,000 people, where a majority of their buildings are on parcels of land smaller than 1,850 m^{2}, apply to Alberta Municipal Affairs for town status under the authority of the Municipal Government Act. Applications for town status are approved via orders in council made by the Lieutenant Governor in Council under recommendation from the Minister of Municipal Affairs.

Alberta has 105 towns that had a cumulative population of 471,028 and an average population of 4,486 in the 2021 Canadian Census. Alberta's largest and smallest towns are Cochrane and Rainbow Lake with populations of 32,199 and 495 respectively. Diamond Valley is Alberta's newest town, which incorporated on January 1, 2023 via amalgamation of the former towns of Black Diamond and Turner Valley.

When a town's population exceeds 10,000 people, the council may request a change to city status, but the change in incorporated status is not mandatory. Towns with populations less than 1,000, whether their populations have declined below 1,000 or they were incorporated as towns prior to the minimum 1,000 population requirement, are permitted to retain town status.

A total of 699 elected town officials (107 mayors and 592 councillors) provide town governance throughout the province.

The highest frequency of towns in Alberta is found in the Queen Elizabeth II Highway/Highway 2A corridor between Calgary and Edmonton corridor including, from south to north, Crossfield, Carstairs, Didsbury, Olds, Bowden, Innisfail, Penhold, Blackfalds, Ponoka and Millet.

== Administration ==
Pursuant to Part 5, Division 1 of the Municipal Government Act (MGA), each municipality created under the authority of the MGA is governed by a council. As a requirement of the MGA, a town council consists of an odd number of councillors, one of which is the town's chief elected official (CEO) or mayor. A town council consists of seven councillors by default, but it can consist of a higher or lower odd number if council passes a bylaw altering its size (so long as it does not consist of fewer than three councillors). For the 2017–2021 term, 82 towns have a council of seven, and 25 have a council of five.

Town councils are governed by a mayor and an even number of councillors that are elected by popular vote, resulting in a total odd number of members to avoid tie votes on council matters. All council members are elected under the provisions of the Local Authorities Election Act (LAEA). Mayoral or councillor candidates are required to be residents of their municipality for a minimum of six consecutive months prior to nomination day. The last municipal election was October 16, 2017.

Alberta Municipal Affairs, a ministry of the Cabinet of Alberta, is charged with coordination of all levels of local government.

Administrative duties of towns include public safety, local transit, roads, water service, drainage and waste collection, as well as coordination of infrastructure with provincial and regional authorities (including road construction, education, and health).

== List ==
The below table is a list of only those urban municipalities in Alberta that are incorporated as towns.

The municipalities of Crowsnest Pass and Jasper are not listed because they are incorporated as specialized municipalities, not towns. For more information on specialized municipalities, see Specialized municipalities of Alberta.

List of towns in Alberta
Name	Specialized/rural municipality	Incorporation date (town)	2021 Census of Population				
Name	Specialized/rural municipality	Incorporation date (town)	Population (2021)	Population (2016)	Change	Land area (km^{2})	Population density (/km^{2})
Athabasca (Note: Athabasca was formerly known as Athabasca Landing prior to August 4, 1913.)	Athabasca County	September 19, 1911	2,759	2,965	−6.9%	17.79	155.1
Banff	Improvement District No. 9 (Banff)	January 1, 1990	8,305	7,851	+5.8%	4.08	2,035.5
Barrhead	Barrhead No. 11, County of	November 26, 1946	4,320	4,579	−5.7%	8.20	526.8
Bashaw	Camrose County	May 1, 1964	848	830	+2.2%	2.72	311.8
Bassano	Newell, County of	January 16, 1911	1,216	1,206	+0.8%	5.23	232.5
Beaverlodge	Grande Prairie No. 1, County of	January 24, 1956	2,271	2,465	−7.9%	5.38	422.1
Bentley	Lacombe County	January 1, 2001	1,042	1,078	−3.3%	2.24	465.2
Blackfalds	Lacombe County	April 1, 1980	10,470	9,328	+12.2%	16.58	631.5
Bon Accord	Sturgeon County	November 20, 1979	1,461	1,529	−4.4%	3.99	366.2
Bonnyville	Bonnyville No. 87, M.D. of	February 3, 1948	6,404	5,975	+7.2%	14.17	451.9
Bow Island	Forty Mile No. 8, County of	February 1, 1912	2,036	1,983	+2.7%	5.68	358.5
Bowden	Red Deer County	September 1, 1981	1,280	1,240	+3.2%	3.46	369.9
Bruderheim	Lamont County	September 17, 1980	1,329	1,323	+0.5%	9.28	143.2
Calmar	Leduc County	January 19, 1954	2,183	2,228	−2.0%	4.67	467.5
Canmore	Bighorn No. 8, M.D. of Kananaskis Improvement District	June 1, 1966	15,990	13,992	+14.3%	68.47	233.5
Cardston	Cardston County	July 2, 1901	3,724	3,585	+3.9%	8.58	434.0
Carstairs	Mountain View County	September 1, 1966	4,898	4,077	+20.1%	11.77	416.1
Castor	Paintearth No. 18, County of	June 27, 1910	803	929	−13.6%	2.61	307.7
Claresholm	Willow Creek No. 26, M.D. of	August 31, 1905	3,804	3,790	+0.4%	10.51	361.9
Coaldale	Lethbridge County	January 7, 1952	8,771	8,331	+5.3%	13.58	645.9
Coalhurst	Lethbridge County	June 1, 1995	2,869	2,668	+7.5%	3.08	931.5
Cochrane	Rocky View County	February 15, 1971	32,199	25,853	+24.5%	31.58	1,019.6
Coronation	Paintearth No. 18, County of	April 29, 1912	868	940	−7.7%	3.57	243.1
Crossfield	Rocky View County	August 1, 1980	3,599	2,983	+20.7%	11.89	302.7
Daysland	Flagstaff County	April 2, 1907	789	824	−4.2%	1.77	445.8
Devon	Leduc County	February 24, 1950	6,545	6,578	−0.5%	14.26	459.0
Diamond Valley	Foothills County	January 1, 2023	5,341	5,264	+1.5%	12.57	424.9
Didsbury	Mountain View County	September 27, 1906	5,070	5,268	−3.8%	16.12	314.5
Drayton Valley	Brazeau County	February 1, 1957	7,291	7,235	+0.8%	30.90	236.0
Drumheller (Note: Drumheller originally incorporated as a city on April 3, 1930, but reverted from city status as a result of its amalgamation with the M.D. of Badlands No. 7 in 1998.)	Kneehill County; Special Area No. 2 Starland County; Wheatland County	March 2, 1916; January 1, 1998	7,909	7,982	−0.9%	107.56	73.5
Eckville	Lacombe County	July 1, 1966	1,014	1,125	−9.9%	1.61	629.8
Edson	Yellowhead County	September 21, 1911	8,374	8,414	−0.5%	29.43	284.5
Elk Point	St. Paul No. 19, County of	January 1, 1962	1,399	1,452	−3.7%	4.91	284.9
Fairview	Fairview No. 136, M.D. of	April 25, 1949	2,817	2,998	−6.0%	10.67	264.0
Falher	Smoky River No. 130, M.D. of	January 1, 1955	1,001	1,047	−4.4%	2.83	353.7
Fort Macleod (Note: Fort Macleod, which grew around the NWMP's Fort Macleod barracks (built 1874), was formerly known as Macleod prior to April 1, 1952.)	Willow Creek No. 26, M.D. of	March 29, 1912	3,297	2,967	+11.1%	22.54	146.3
Fox Creek	Greenview No. 16, M.D. of	September 1, 1983	1,639	1,971	−16.8%	12.26	133.7
Gibbons	Sturgeon County	April 1, 1977	3,218	3,159	+1.9%	9.46	340.2
Grimshaw	Peace No. 135, M.D. of	February 2, 1953	2,601	2,718	−4.3%	7.08	367.4
Hanna	Special Area No. 2	April 14, 1914	2,394	2,559	−6.4%	8.40	285.0
Hardisty	Flagstaff County	November 9, 1910	548	554	−1.1%	4.50	121.8
High Level	Mackenzie County	September 1, 1983	3,922	3,159	+24.2%	28.70	136.7
High Prairie	Big Lakes County	January 10, 1950	2,380	2,564	−7.2%	7.01	339.5
High River	Foothills No. 31, M.D. of	February 12, 1906	14,324	13,594	+5.4%	22.19	645.5
Hinton	Yellowhead County	December 29, 1958	9,817	9,882	−0.7%	33.32	294.6
Innisfail	Red Deer County	November 20, 1903	7,985	7,847	+1.8%	19.39	411.8
Irricana	Rocky View County	June 9, 2005	1,179	1,216	−3.0%	3.23	365.0
Killam	Flagstaff County	May 1, 1965	918	989	−7.2%	6.40	143.4
Lamont	Lamont County	May 31, 1968	1,744	1,774	−1.7%	9.14	190.8
Legal	Sturgeon County	January 1, 1998	1,232	1,345	−8.4%	3.18	387.4
Magrath	Cardston County	July 24, 1907	2,481	2,374	+4.5%	5.88	421.9
Manning	Northern Lights, County of	January 1, 1957	1,126	1,183	−4.8%	3.71	303.5
Mayerthorpe	Lac Ste. Anne County	March 20, 1961	1,259	1,320	−4.6%	4.39	286.8
McLennan	Smoky River No. 130, M.D. of	February 11, 1948	695	701	−0.9%	3.58	194.1
Milk River	Warner No. 5, County of	February 7, 1956	824	827	−0.4%	2.42	340.5
Millet	Wetaskiwin No. 10, County of	September 1, 1983	1,890	1,955	−3.3%	6.62	285.5
Morinville	Sturgeon County	April 21, 1911	10,385	9,848	+5.5%	11.15	931.4
Mundare	Lamont County	January 4, 1951	689	852	−19.1%	4.12	167.2
Nanton	Willow Creek No. 26, M.D. of	August 9, 1907	2,167	2,181	−0.6%	5.11	424.1
Nobleford	Lethbridge County	February 28, 2018	1,438	1,278	+12.5%	1.69	850.9
Okotoks	Foothills No. 31, M.D. of	June 1, 1904	30,405	29,016	+4.8%	38.55	788.7
Olds	Mountain View County	July 1, 1905	9,209	9,184	+0.3%	14.92	617.2
Onoway	Lac Ste. Anne County	September 1, 2005	966	1,029	−6.1%	3.31	291.8
Oyen	Special Area No. 3	September 1, 1965	917	1,001	−8.4%	5.15	178.1
Peace River (Note: Peace River was formerly known as Peace River Crossing prior to May 22, 1916.)	Northern Lights, County of Northern Sunrise County; Peace No. 135, M.D. of	December 1, 1919	6,619	6,842	−3.3%	25.34	261.2
Penhold	Red Deer County	September 1, 1980	3,484	3,287	+6.0%	11.20	311.1
Picture Butte	Lethbridge County	January 1, 1960	1,930	1,810	+6.6%	3.02	639.1
Pincher Creek	Pincher Creek No. 9, M.D. of	May 12, 1906	3,622	3,642	−0.5%	9.87	367.0
Ponoka	Ponoka County	October 15, 1904	7,331	7,229	+1.4%	17.22	425.7
Provost	Provost No. 52, M.D. of	December 29, 1952	1,900	1,998	−4.9%	4.75	400.0
Rainbow Lake	Mackenzie County	September 1, 1995	495	795	−37.7%	10.76	46.0
Raymond	Warner No. 5, County of	July 1, 1903	4,199	3,713	+13.1%	7.63	550.3
Redcliff	Cypress County	August 5, 1912	5,581	5,600	−0.3%	16.15	345.6
Redwater	Sturgeon County	December 31, 1950	2,115	2,053	+3.0%	19.93	106.1
Rimbey	Ponoka County	December 13, 1948	2,470	2,567	−3.8%	11.38	217.0
Rocky Mountain House	Clearwater County	August 31, 1939	6,765	6,635	+2.0%	13.05	518.4
Sedgewick	Flagstaff County	May 1, 1966	761	811	−6.2%	2.71	280.8
Sexsmith	Grande Prairie No. 1, County of	October 15, 1979	2,427	2,620	−7.4%	13.01	186.5
Slave Lake	Lesser Slave River No. 124, M.D. of	August 2, 1965	6,836	6,651	+2.8%	14.31	477.7
Smoky Lake	Smoky Lake County	February 1, 1962	1,127	964	+16.9%	4.26	264.6
Spirit River	Spirit River No. 133, M.D. of	September 18, 1951	849	995	−14.7%	3.11	273.0
St. Paul (Note: St. Paul was formerly known as St. Paul de Métis prior to December 15, 1932.)	St. Paul No. 19, County of	December 15, 1936	5,863	5,827	+0.6%	8.64	678.6
Stavely	Willow Creek No. 26, M.D. of	May 25, 1912	544	541	+0.6%	1.78	305.6
Stettler	Stettler No. 6, County of	November 23, 1906	5,695	5,952	−4.3%	13.19	431.8
Stony Plain	Parkland County	December 10, 1908	17,993	17,189	+4.7%	35.45	507.6
Strathmore	Wheatland County	July 6, 1911	14,339	13,756	+4.2%	26.98	531.5
Sundre	Mountain View County	January 1, 1956	2,672	2,729	−2.1%	10.84	246.5
Swan Hills	Big Lakes County	January 1, 1967	1,201	1,301	−7.7%	25.87	46.4
Sylvan Lake	Red Deer County	May 20, 1946	15,995	14,816	+8.0%	23.09	692.7
Taber	Taber, M.D. of	July 1, 1907	8,862	8,428	+5.1%	19.32	458.7
Thorsby	Leduc County	January 1, 2017	967	985	−1.8%	3.80	254.5
Three Hills	Kneehill County	January 1, 1929	3,042	3,212	−5.3%	6.74	451.3
Tofield	Beaver County	September 10, 1909	2,045	2,081	−1.7%	8.21	249.1
Trochu	Kneehill County	August 1, 1962	998	1,058	−5.7%	2.78	359.0
Two Hills	Two Hills No. 21, County of	January 1, 1955	1,416	1,352	+4.7%	3.11	455.3
Valleyview	Greenview No. 16, M.D. of	February 5, 1957	1,673	1,863	−10.2%	9.17	182.4
Vauxhall	Taber, M.D. of	January 1, 1961	1,286	1,222	+5.2%	2.71	474.5
Vegreville	Minburn No. 27, County of	August 15, 1906	5,689	5,708	−0.3%	14.08	404.0
Vermilion	Vermilion River, County of	August 27, 1906	3,948	4,084	−3.3%	12.72	310.4
Viking	Beaver County	November 10, 1952	986	1,083	−9.0%	3.45	285.8
Vulcan	Vulcan County	June 15, 1921	1,769	1,917	−7.7%	6.28	281.7
Wainwright	Wainwright No. 61, M.D. of	July 14, 1910	6,606	6,285	+5.1%	12.17	542.8
Wembley	Grande Prairie No. 1, County of	August 1, 1980	1,432	1,516	−5.5%	4.74	302.1
Westlock	Westlock County	January 7, 1947	4,921	5,101	−3.5%	13.37	368.1
Whitecourt	Woodlands County	December 20, 1971	9,927	10,209	−2.8%	29.51	336.4
Total towns	—	—	471,028	455,389	+3.4%	1,294.84	363.8

== New towns ==
New town is a former urban municipal status in Alberta that is no longer in use. The authority to incorporate a community as a new town came from The New Towns Act, which was chapter 39 of the Statutes of Alberta, 1956.

At least 12 communities incorporated as a new town between 1956 and 1967. Cynthia and Drayton Valley were the first communities in Alberta to incorporate as new towns on June 1, 1956. Drayton Valley did so after only six months of incorporation as a village, and was also the community that operated under new town status for the shortest period – eight months from June 1, 1956, to February 1, 1957.

The last community to incorporate as a new town was Fox Creek on July 19, 1967. Fox Creek was previously unincorporated prior to this date. It remained a new town for just over sixteen years until September 1, 1983, when it changed to town status.

Rainbow Lake was the last community to be recognized as a new town. Its status was changed to that of a town in 1994 when numerous former acts under the authority of Alberta Municipal Affairs were transitioned into the current Municipal Government Act. Rainbow Lake was also the community that operated under new town status for the longest period – nearly 28 years from September 1, 1966, to May 2, 1994.

Other communities that applied for new town status included Slave Lake and Smith. Slave Lake applied, despite already being incorporated, to access additional provincial funding but the application was denied by the provincial cabinet. In the case of Smith, after applying in 1968, its application was denied after the province's feasibility study for the community determined Smith was unlikely to attract further economic development.

Below is a list of the 12 communities that were once incorporated as a new town. All but one of them are resource communities in northern or west–central Alberta and were recently founded communities at their dates of incorporation as new towns. St. Albert was the only community that was not in northern or west–central Alberta and had been incorporated as its own municipality since December 7, 1899.

Former new town	Incorporation date (new town)	Previous status	Subsequent status change date	Subsequent status
Cynthia	June 1, 1956	Unincorporated	May 1, 1959	Hamlet (Note: Cynthia dissolved as development in Cynthia "did not materialize sufficiently to warrant the attention of a Board of Administrators as appointed under the New Towns Act", and did not have "sufficient population or occupied dwellings ... to allow for its establishment into a town or a village under the provisions of The Towns and Villages Act.")
Drayton Valley	June 1, 1956	Village	February 1, 1957	Town
Fort McMurray	June 30, 1964	Town	September 1, 1980	City (Note: Fort McMurray later dissolved from city status on April 1, 1995, and is now designated as an urban service area.)
Fox Creek	July 19, 1967	Unincorporated	September 1, 1983	Town
Grande Cache	September 1, 1966	Unincorporated	September 1, 1983	Town
High Level	June 1, 1965	Hamlet	September 1, 1983	Town
Hinton	November 1, 1956	Hamlet	December 29, 1958	Town
Lodgepole	July 1, 1956	Unincorporated	March 1, 1970	Hamlet (Note: Lodgepole dissolved as development in Lodgepole "did not materialize sufficiently to qualify under the provisions of the Municipal Government Act for the formation of a town or village.")
Rainbow Lake	September 1, 1966	Unincorporated	May 2, 1994	Town
St. Albert	January 1, 1957	Town	July 3, 1962	Town (Note: St. Albert later incorporated as a city on January 1, 1977.)
Swan Hills	September 1, 1959	Unincorporated	January 1, 1967	Town
Whitecourt	August 15, 1961	Village	December 20, 1971	Town

== Former towns ==
All cities in Alberta and the former cities of Fort McMurray and Strathcona previously held town status in their histories. Other communities that previously held town status include Beverly, Big Valley, Blairmore, Bowness, Black Diamond, Carmangay, Coleman, Cynthia, Diamond City, Forest Lawn, Gleichen, Grande Cache, Grand Centre, Grouard, Irvine, Jasper Place, Lac La Biche, Lodgepole, Montgomery, Turner Valley and Youngstown. Of these, the villages of Big Valley, Carmangay and Youngstown are the only communities that remain incorporated municipalities. The others either amalgamated to form other municipalities (Blairmore, Coleman, Grand Centre and Lac La Biche), were absorbed through annexation by Calgary (Bowness, Forest Lawn and Montgomery) or Edmonton (Beverly and Jasper Place) or dissolved to become hamlets under the jurisdiction of municipal districts (Cynthia, Diamond City, Gleichen, Grande Cache, Grouard, Irvine and Lodgepole).

== Town status eligibility ==
The villages of Stirling, Duchess, and Alberta Beach, with population counts of 1,269, 1,085, and 1,018 respectively, meet the legislated population requirements for town status. There are also at least ten hamlets – Cardiff, Clairmont, Dunmore, Fort Chipewyan, Grande Cache, La Crete, Lac La Biche, Langdon, Springbrook, and Wabasca – that meet the population requirements for town status.

== City status eligibility ==
There are currently nine towns – Blackfalds, Canmore, Cochrane, High River, Okotoks, Stony Plain, Strathmore, Sylvan Lake and Whitecourt – that are eligible for city status having populations in excess of 10,000. In addition, the Town of Hinton has expressed interest in incorporating as a city once it surpasses 10,000 people. Its population in 2016 was 9,882. In 2016, the Town of Morinville conducted a municipal census in which it anticipated the town would surpass 10,000; thus the town investigated city status as well as a specialized municipality model with Sturgeon County. The census reported a population of 9,893, which was 107 people shy of the milestone.

== Gallery ==
Towns in Alberta
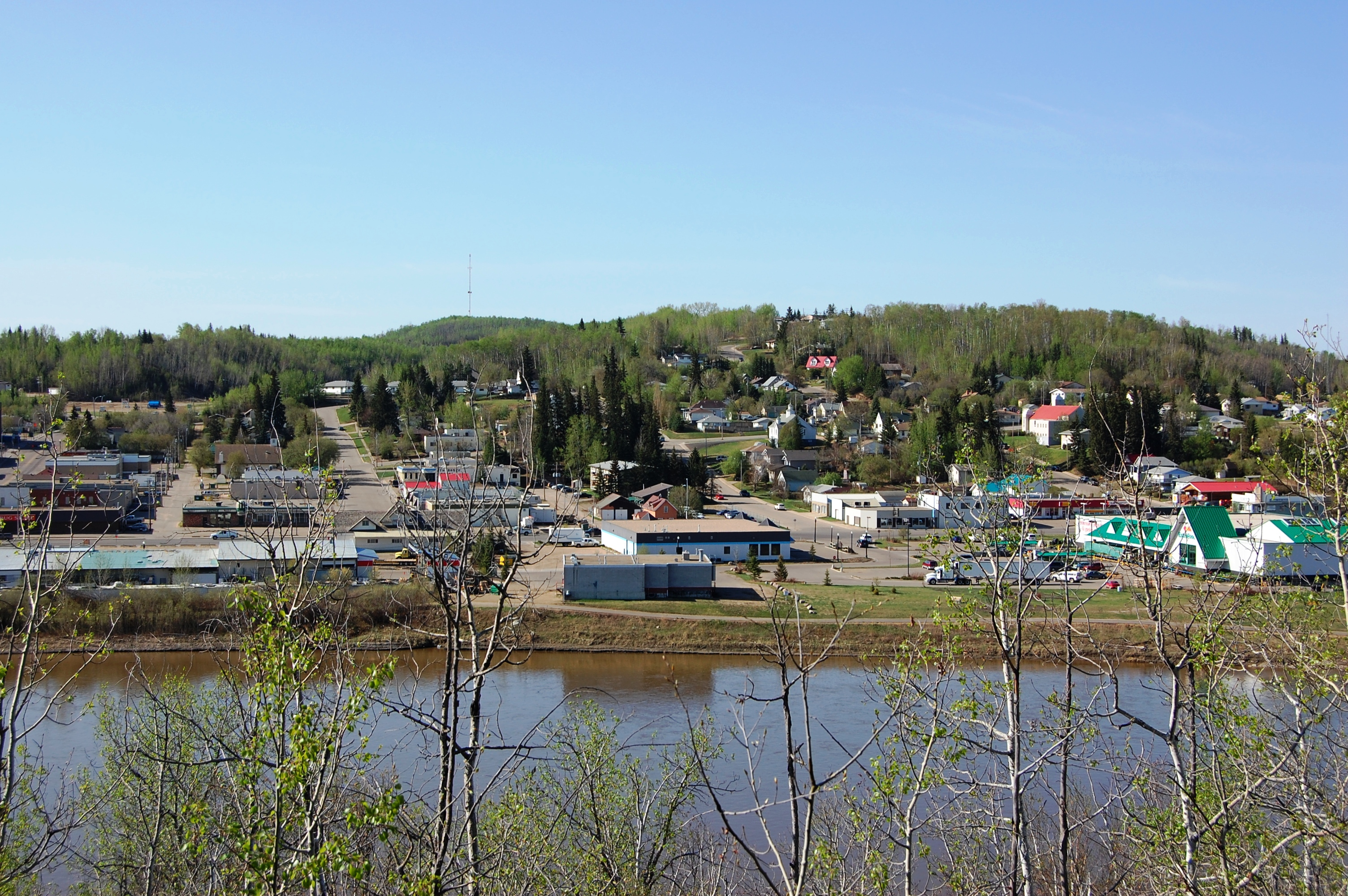
Athabasca

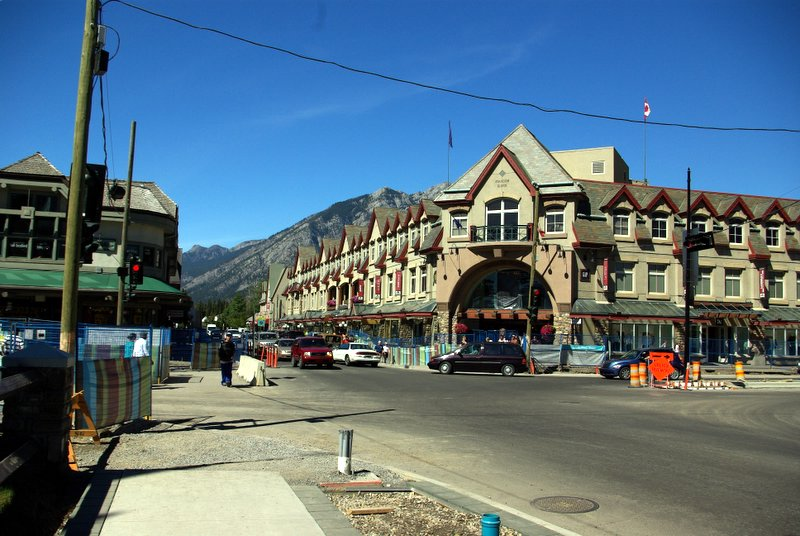
Banff

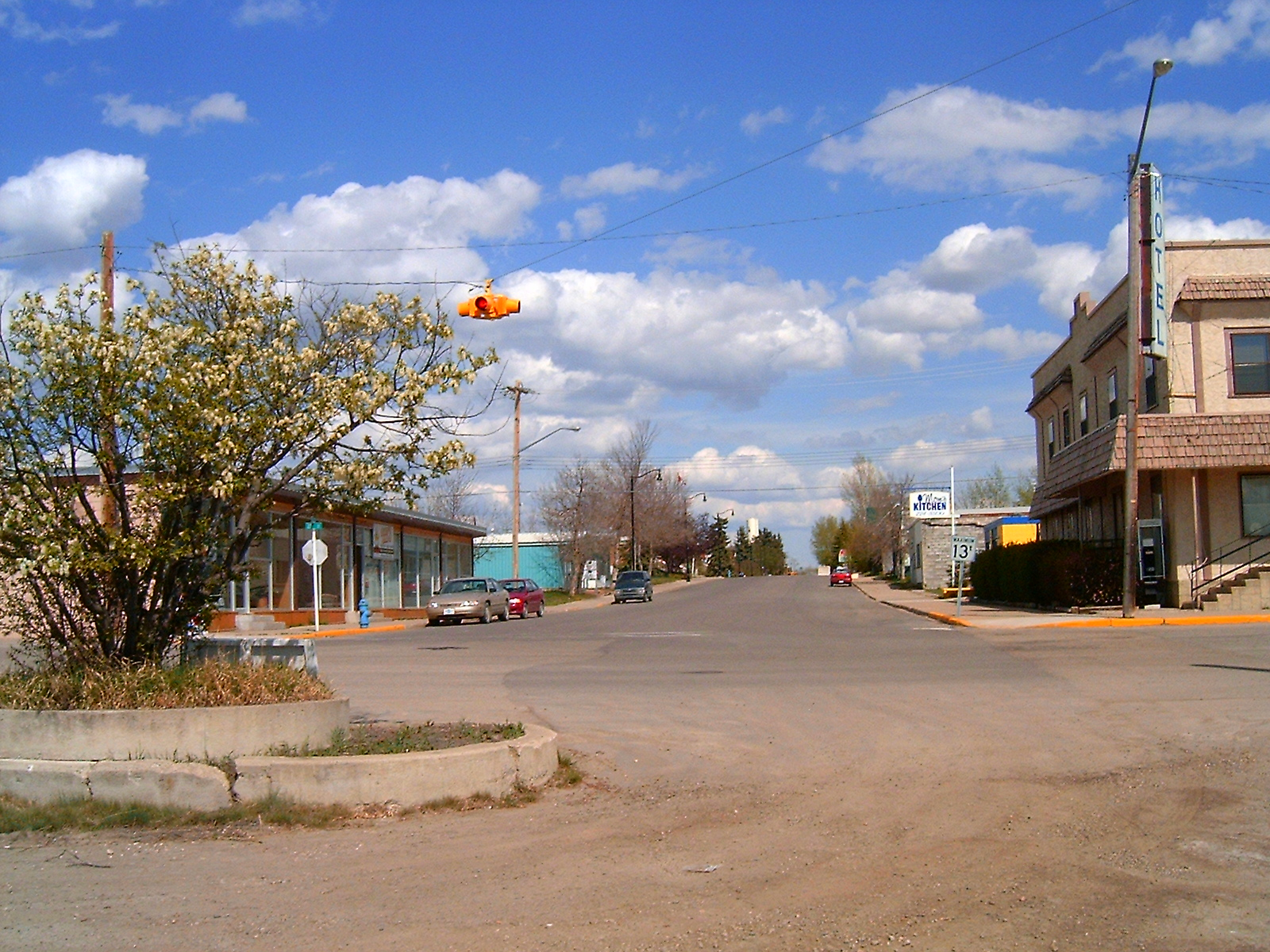
Bowden

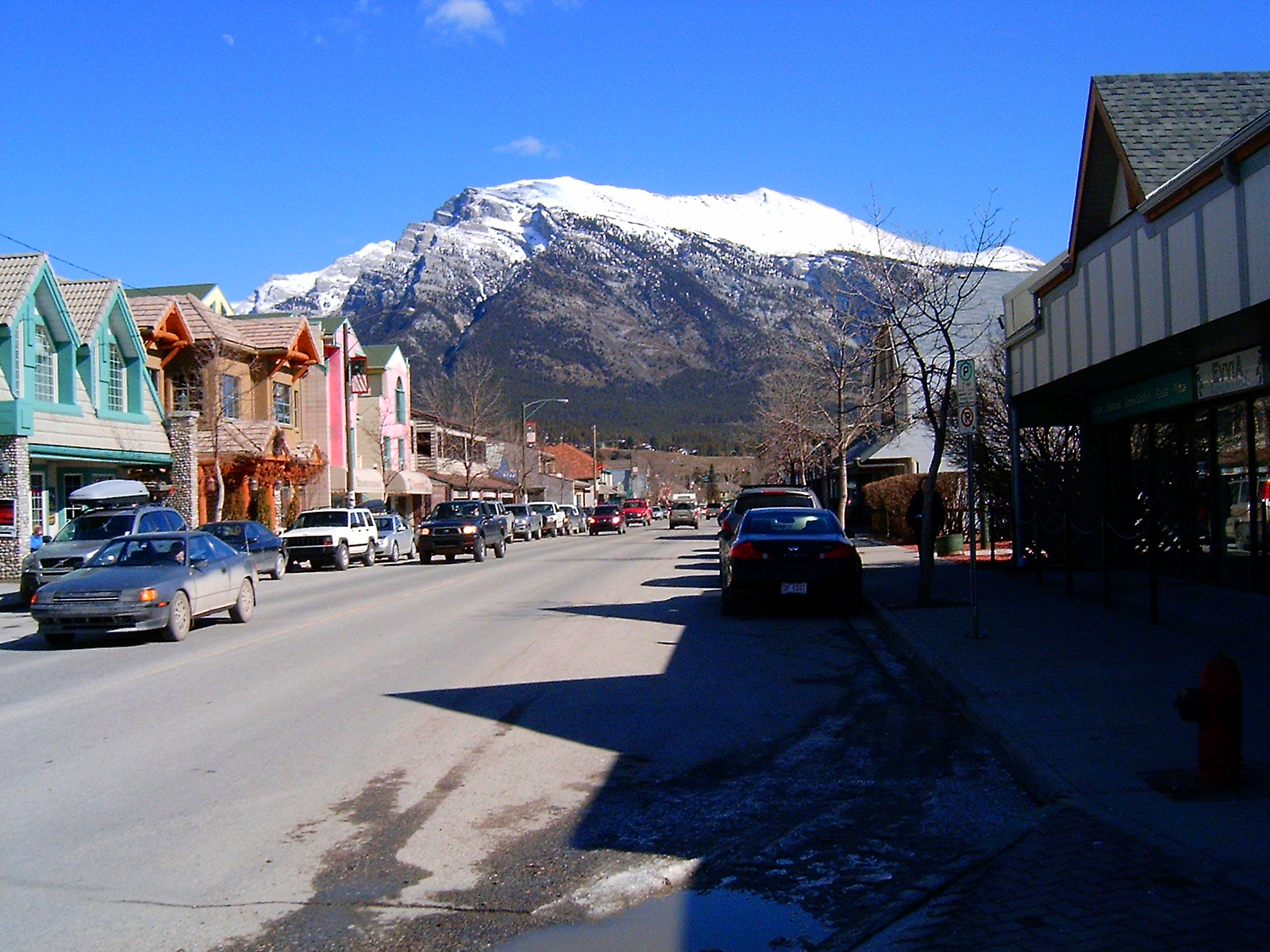
Canmore

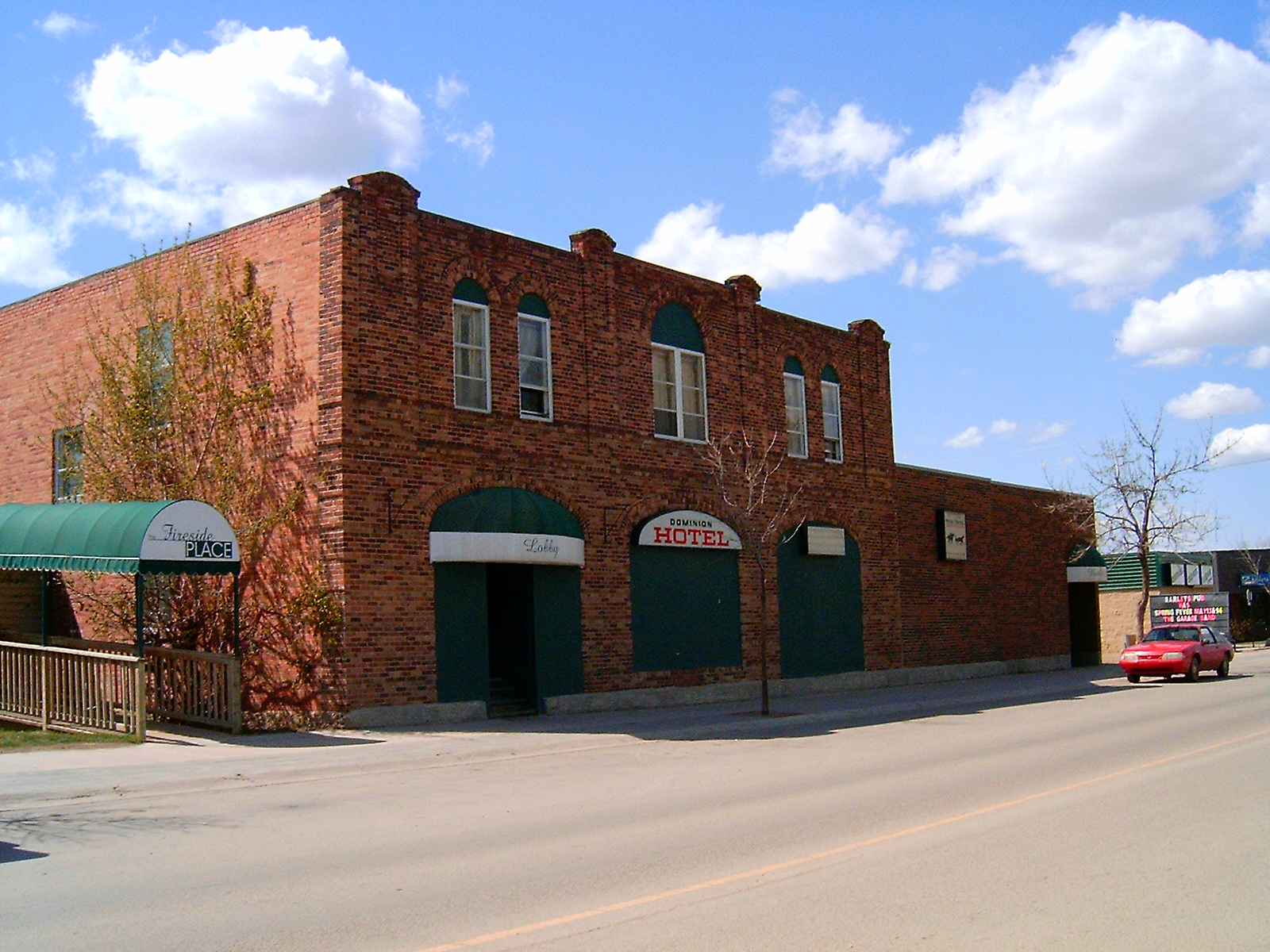
Carstairs

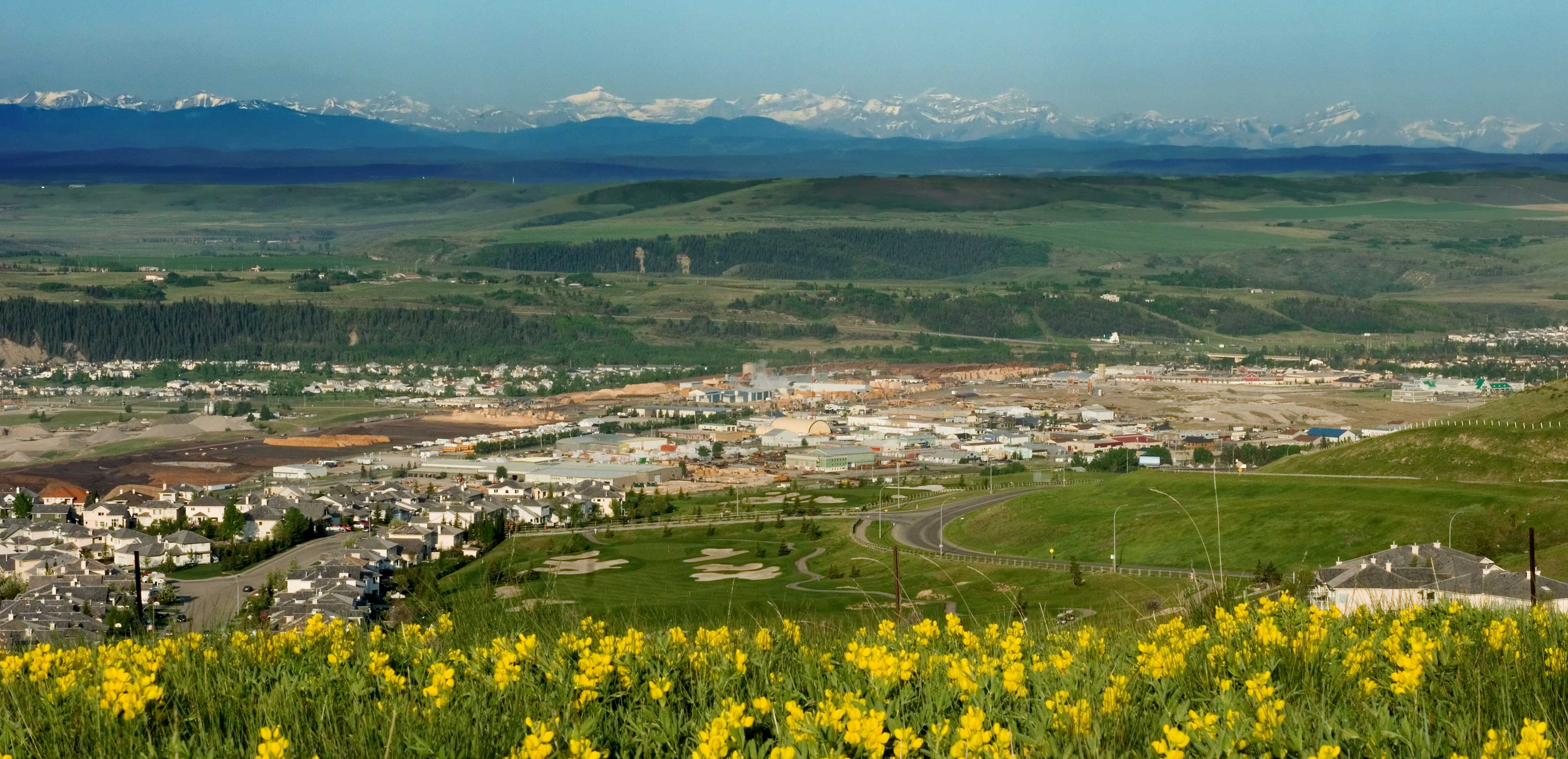
Cochrane

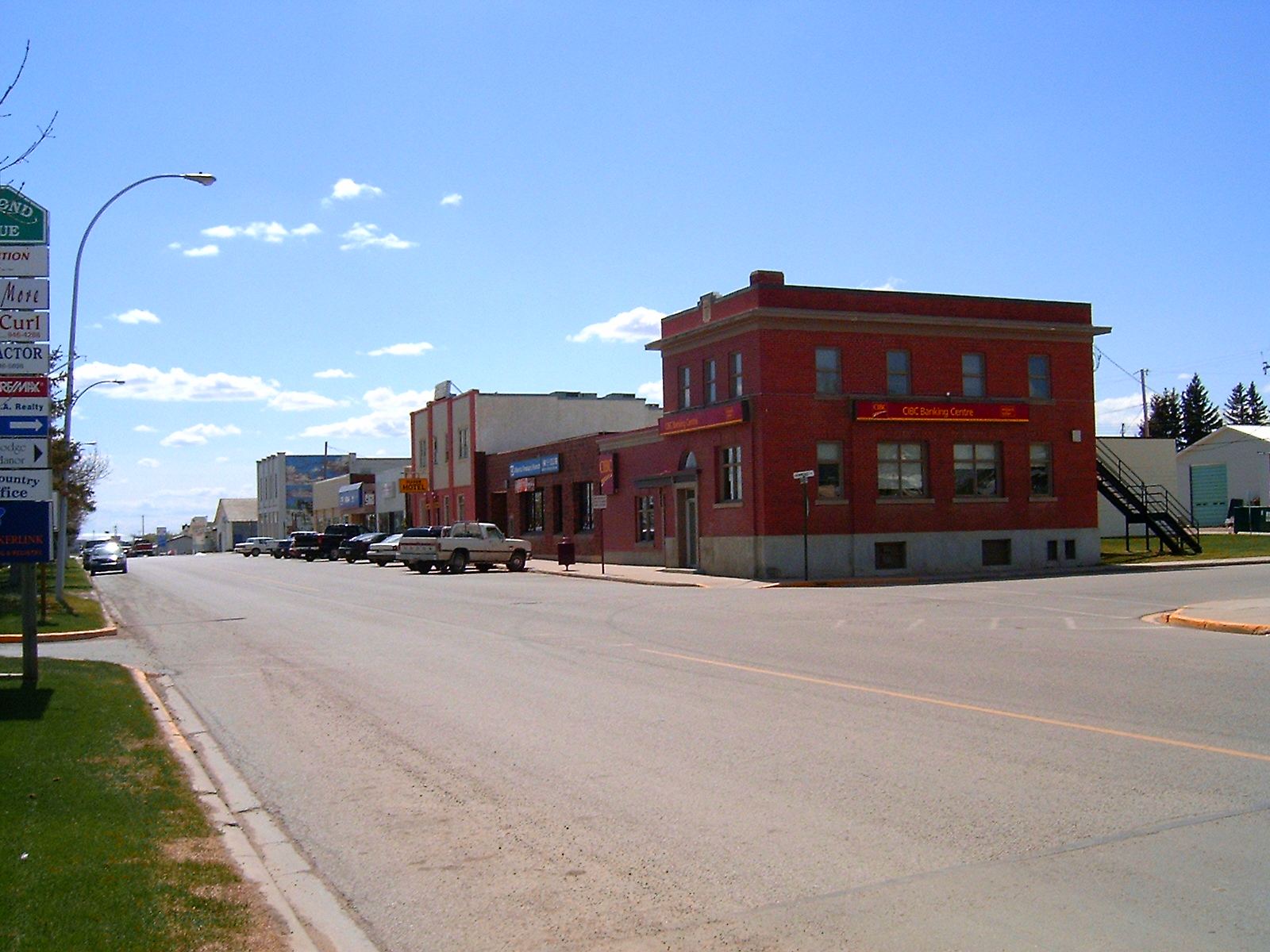
Crossfield

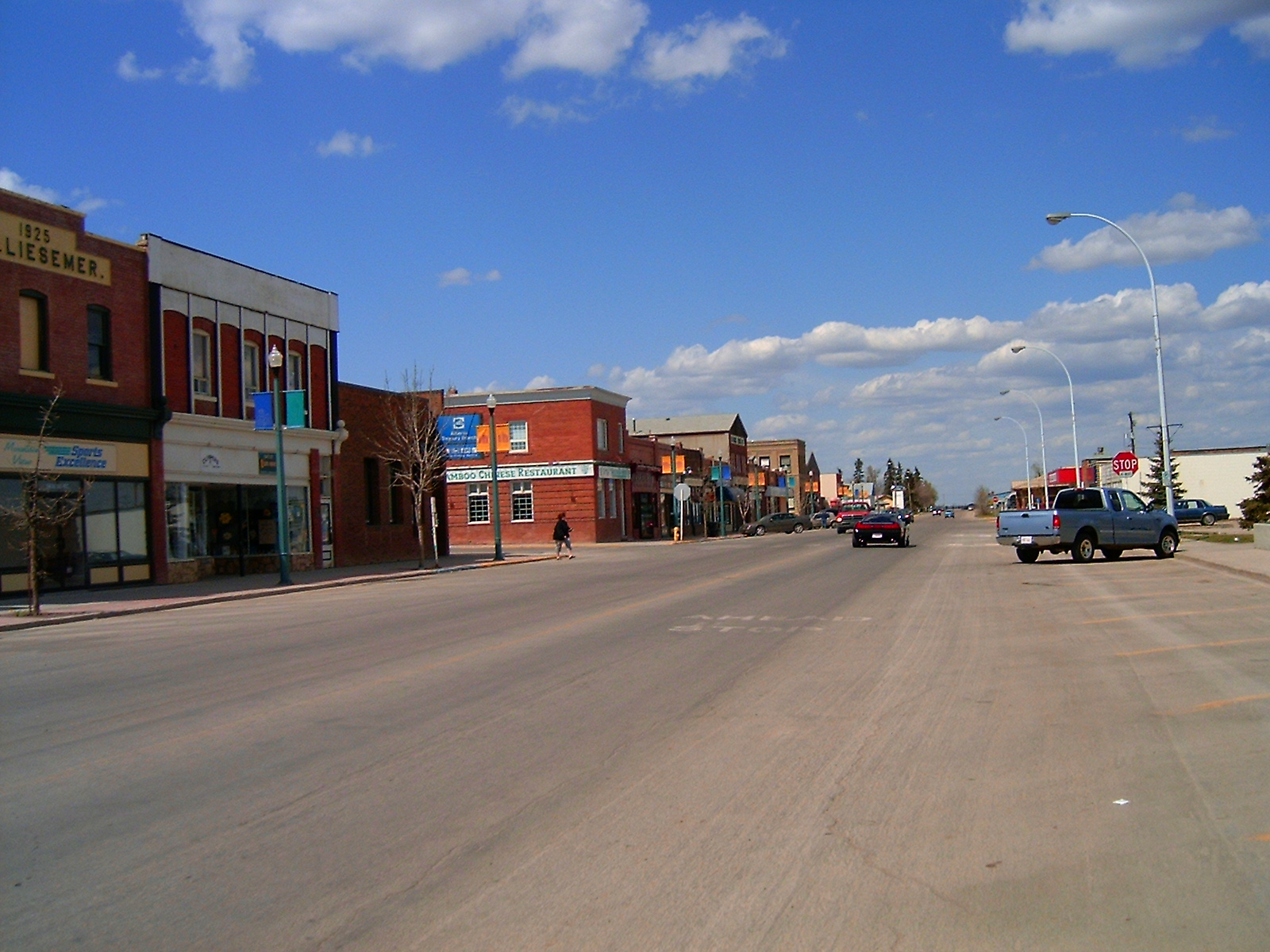
Didsbury

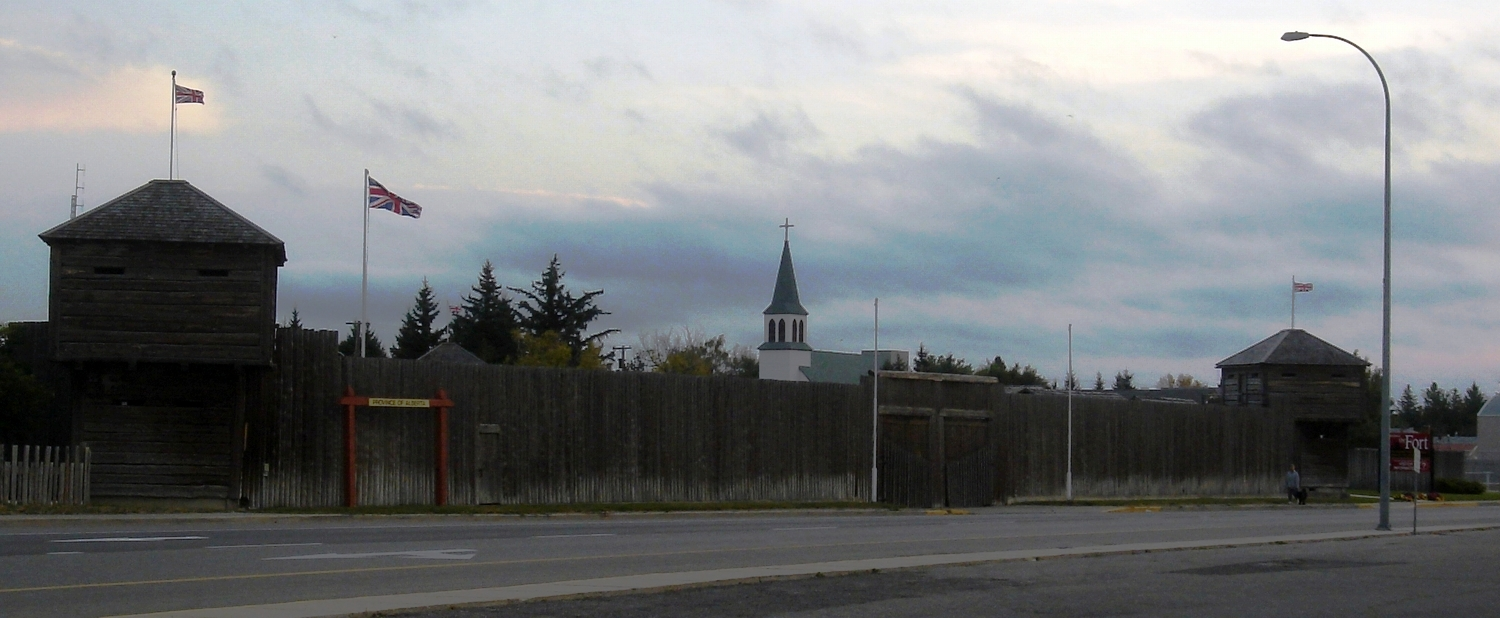
Fort Macleod

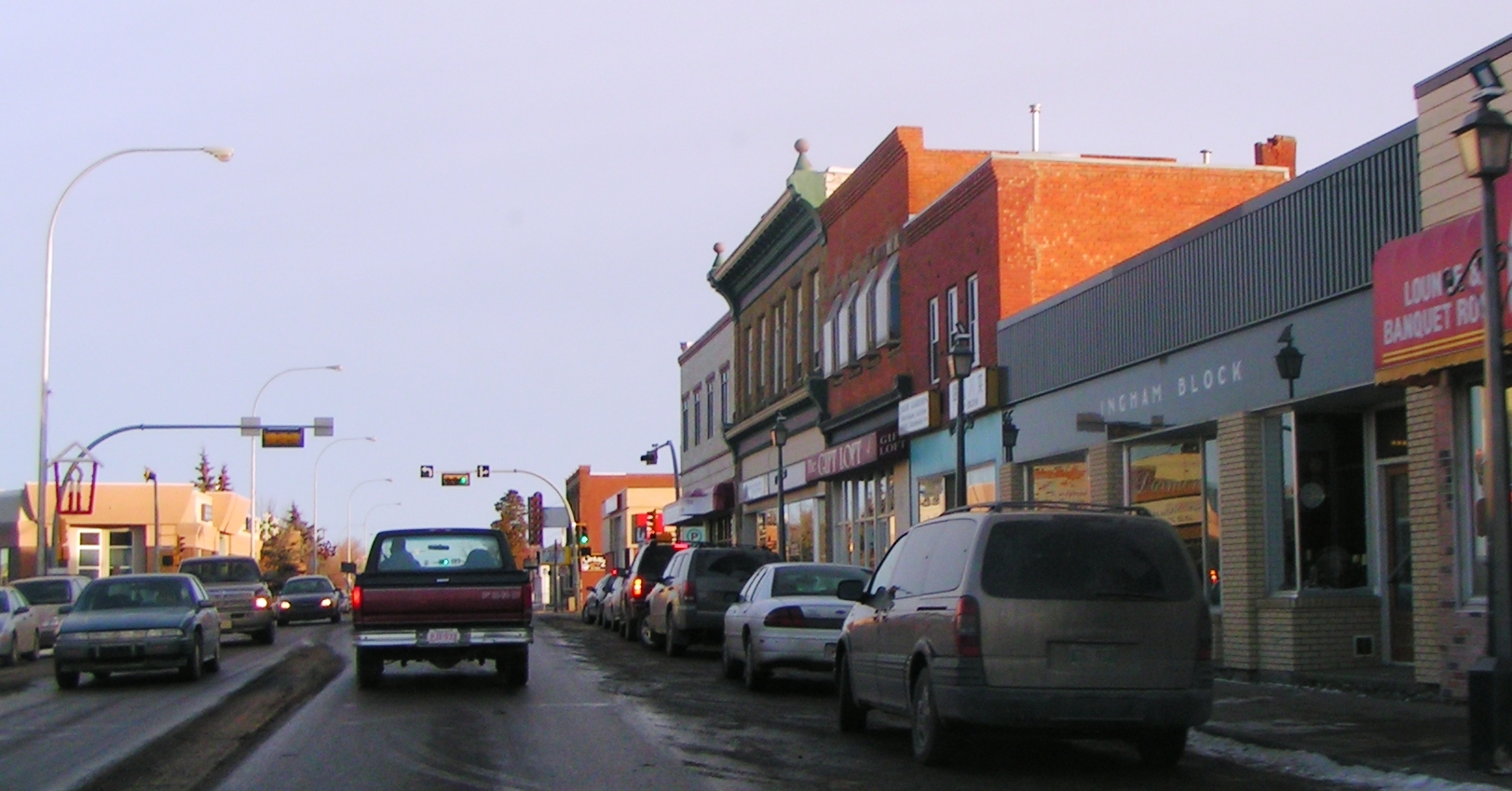
Innisfail

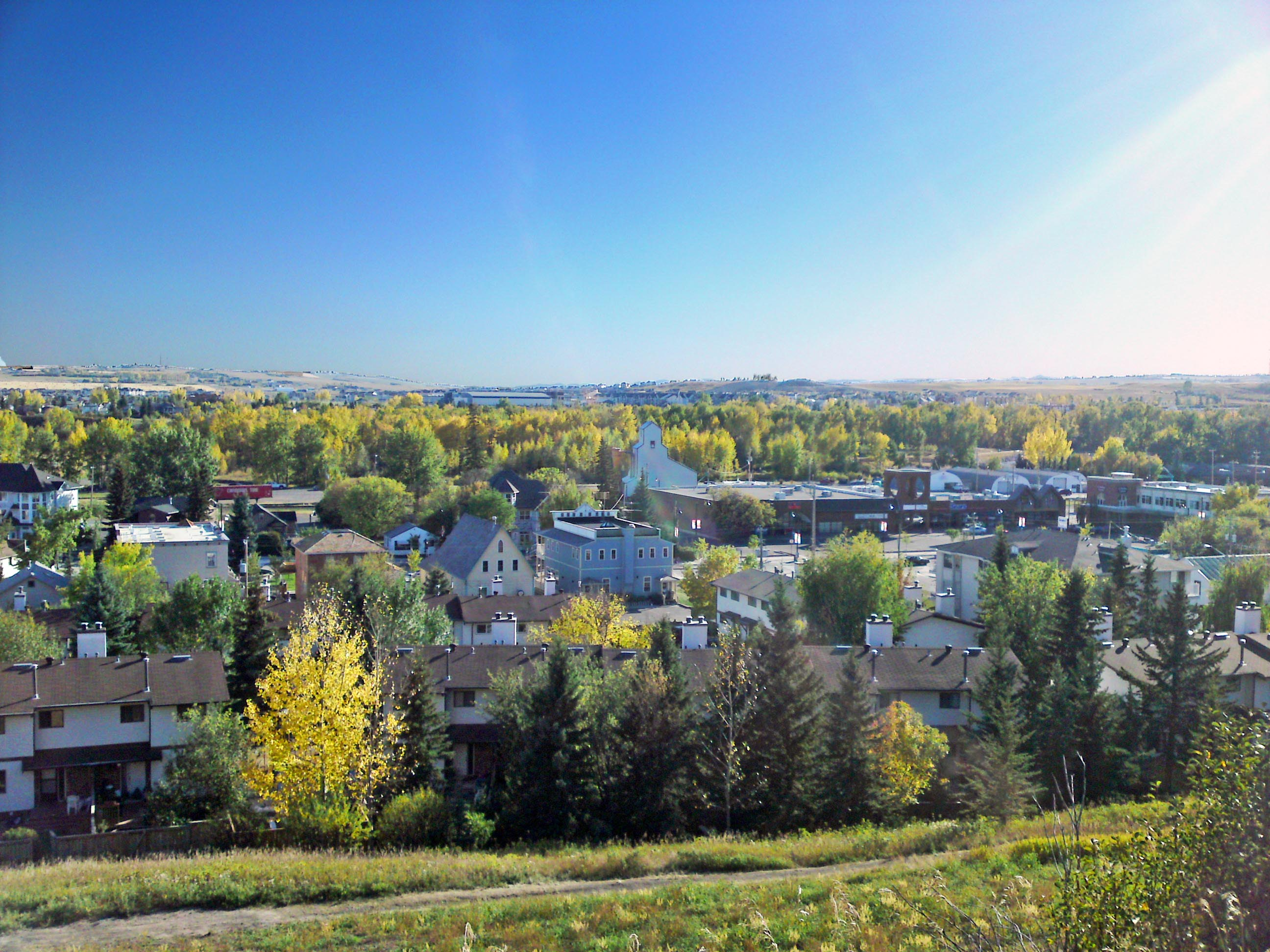
Okotoks

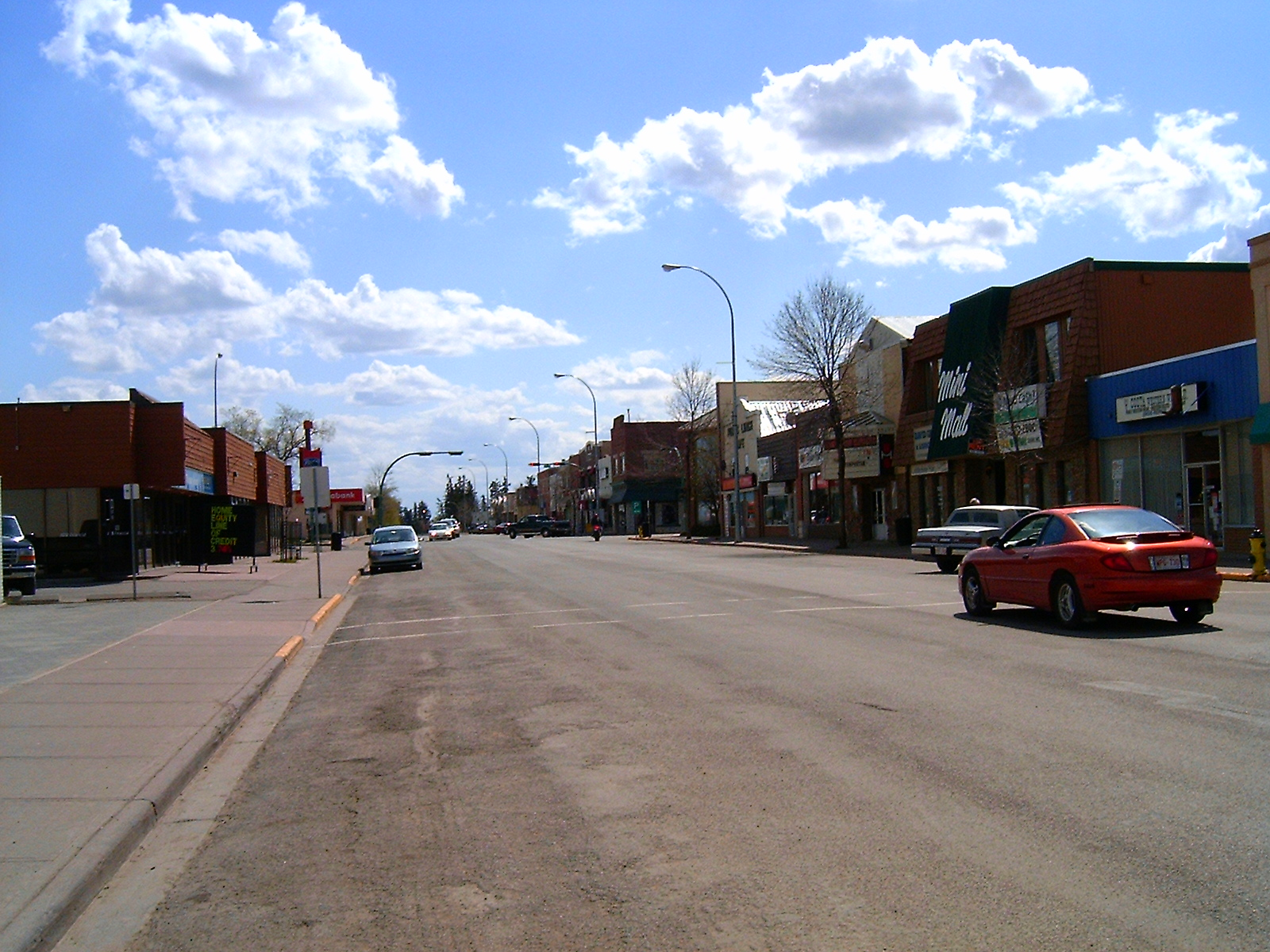
Olds

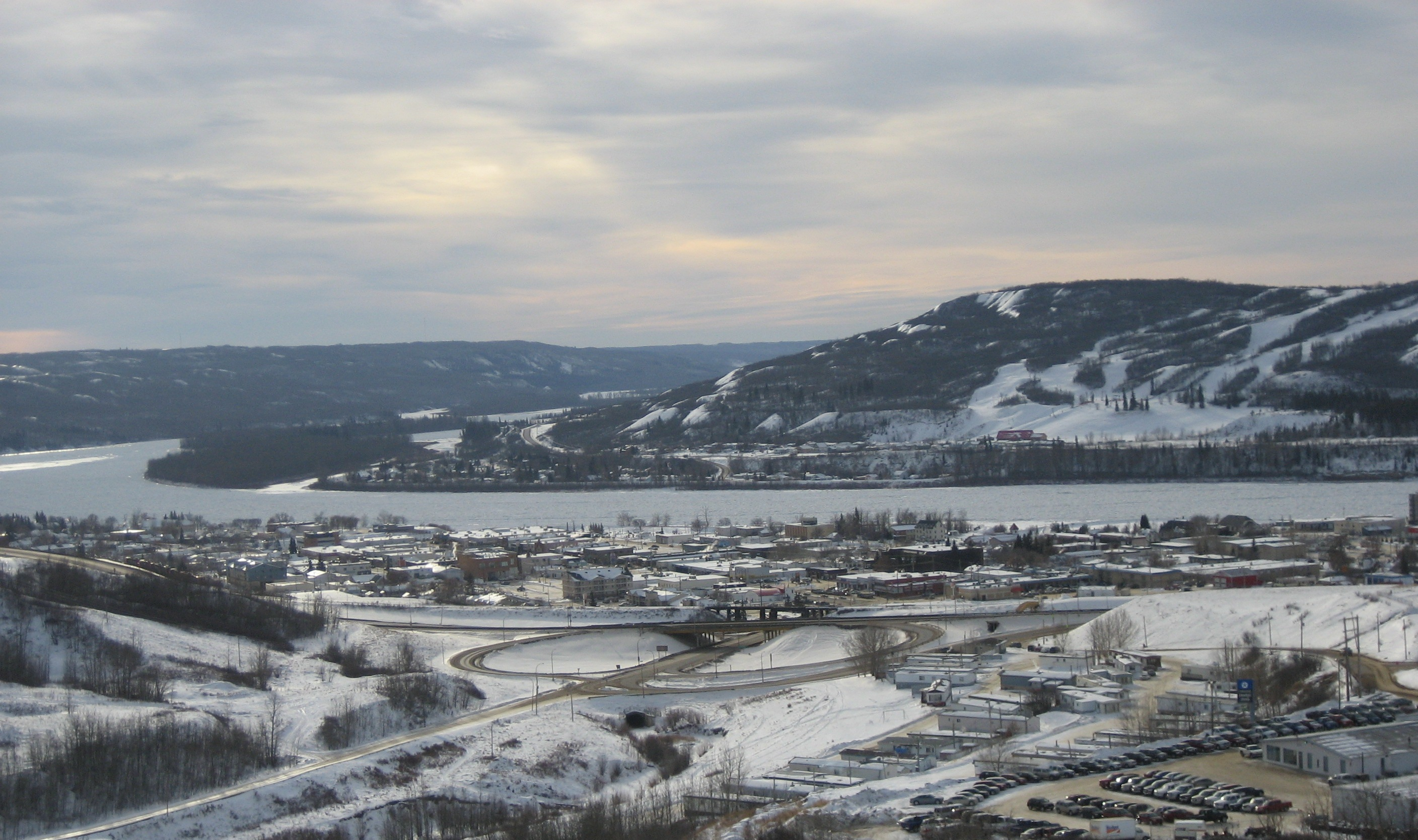
Peace River

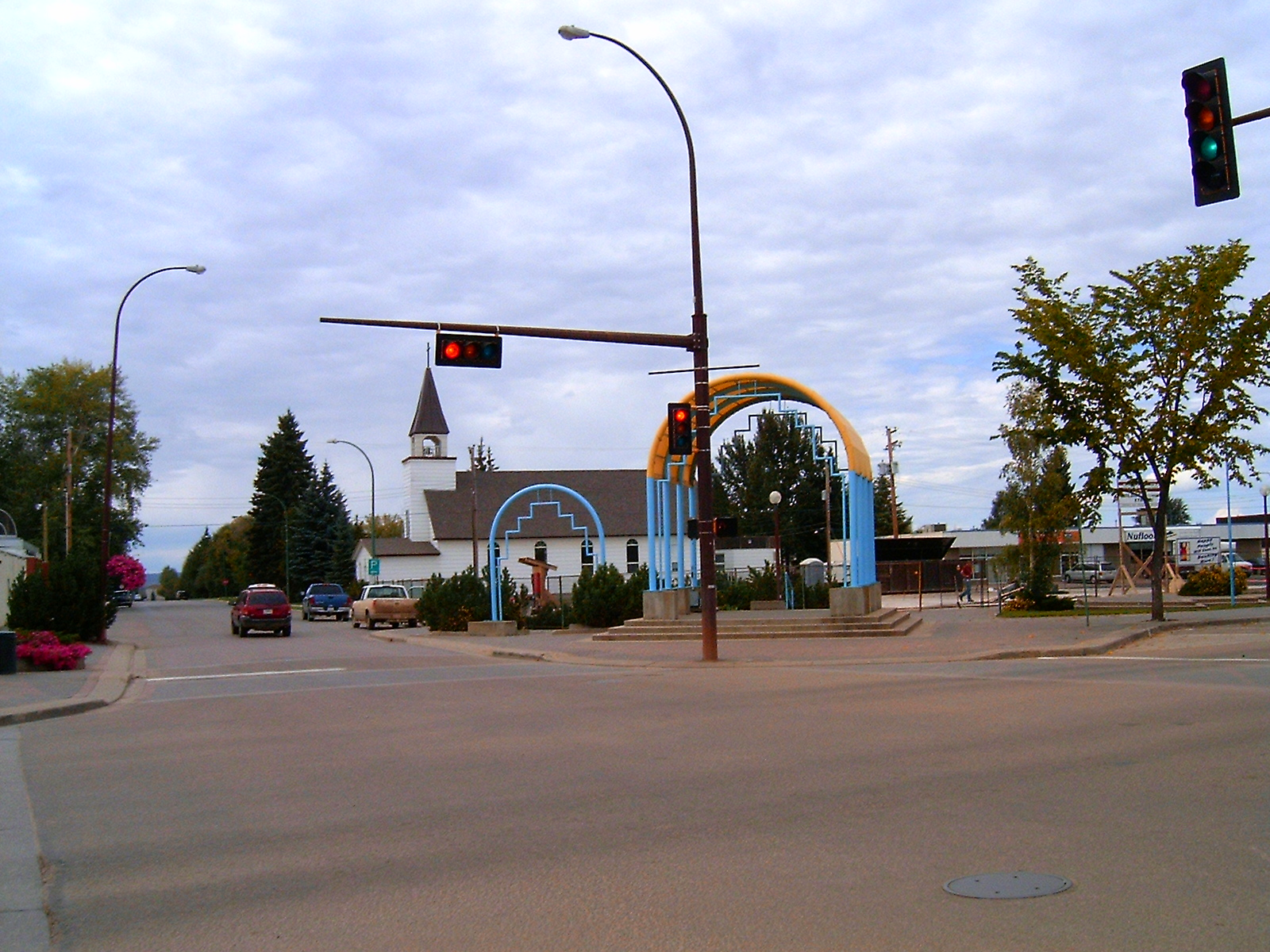
Slave Lake

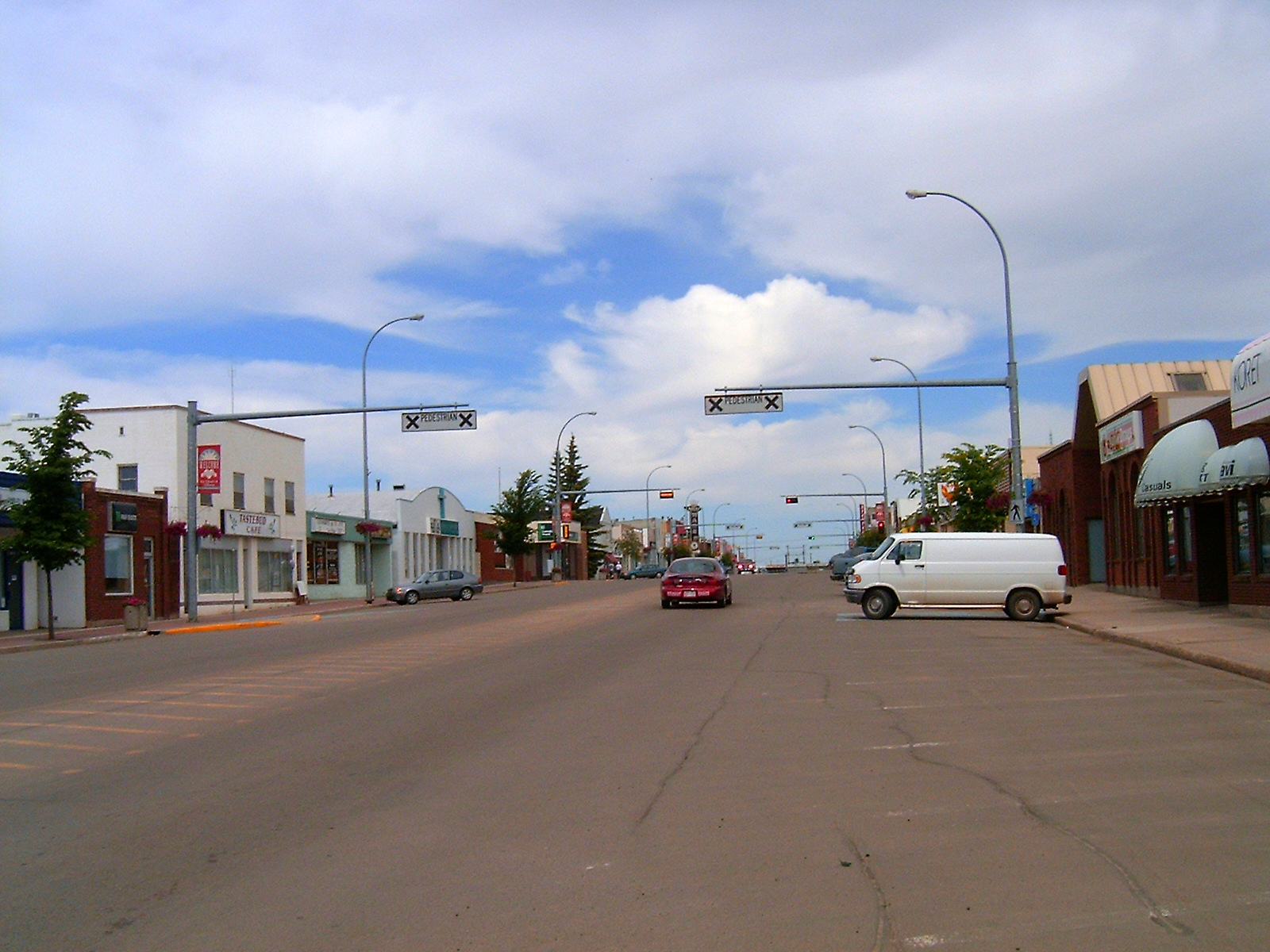
Stettler

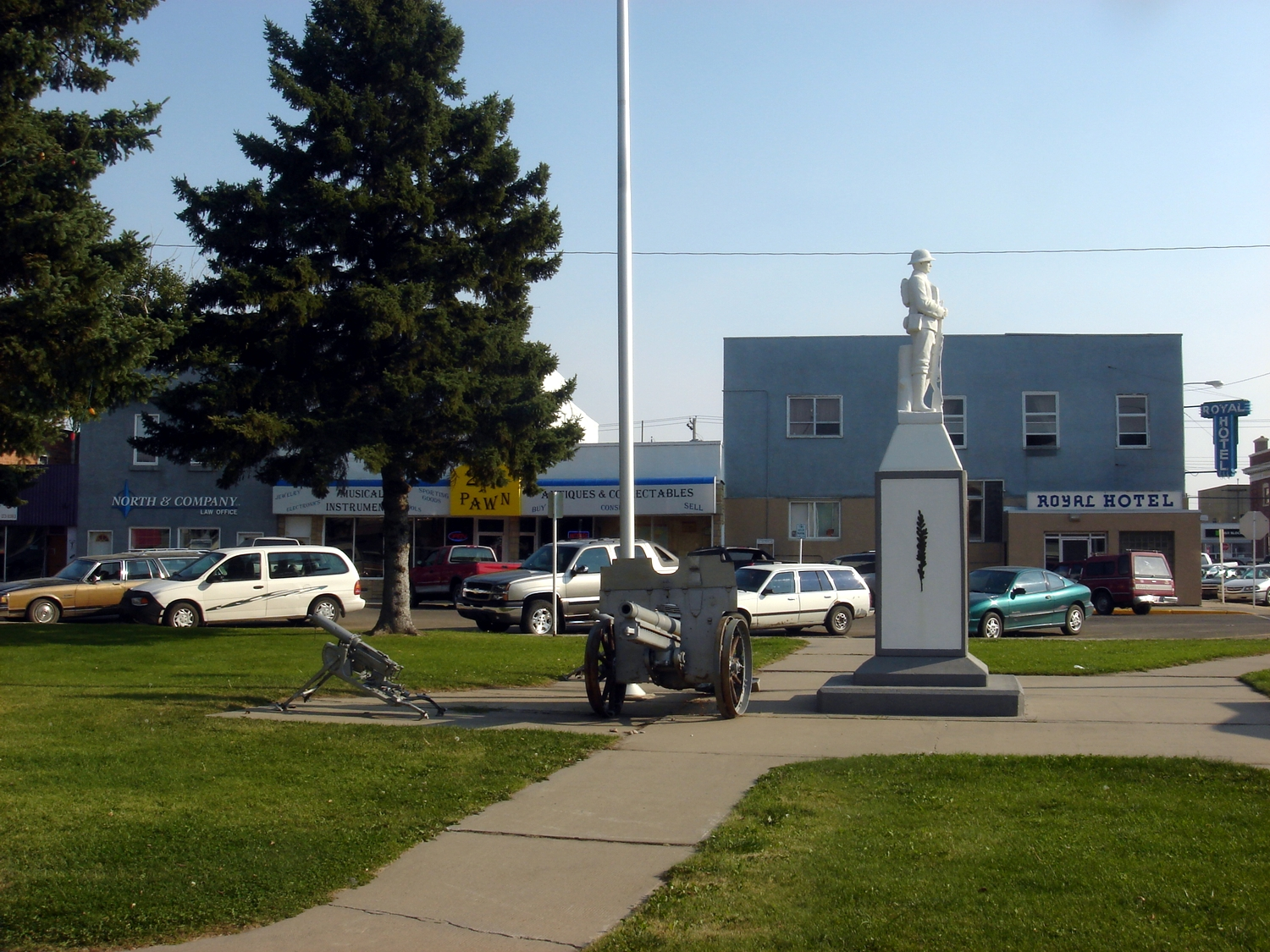
Taber

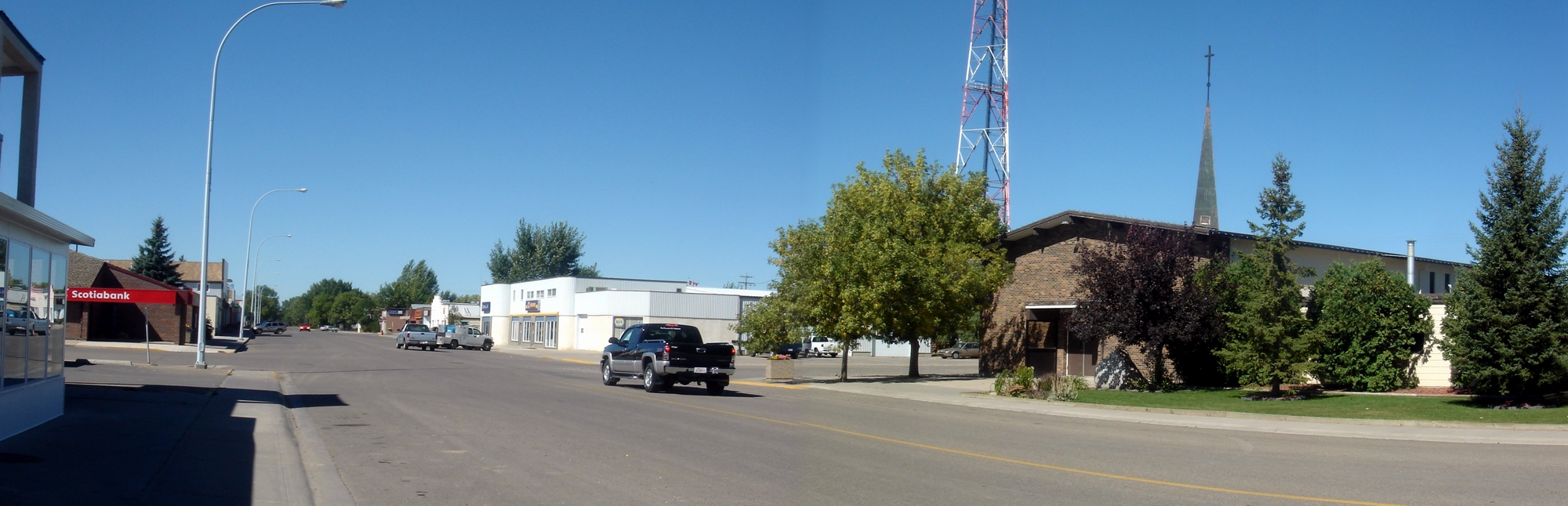
Vauxhall

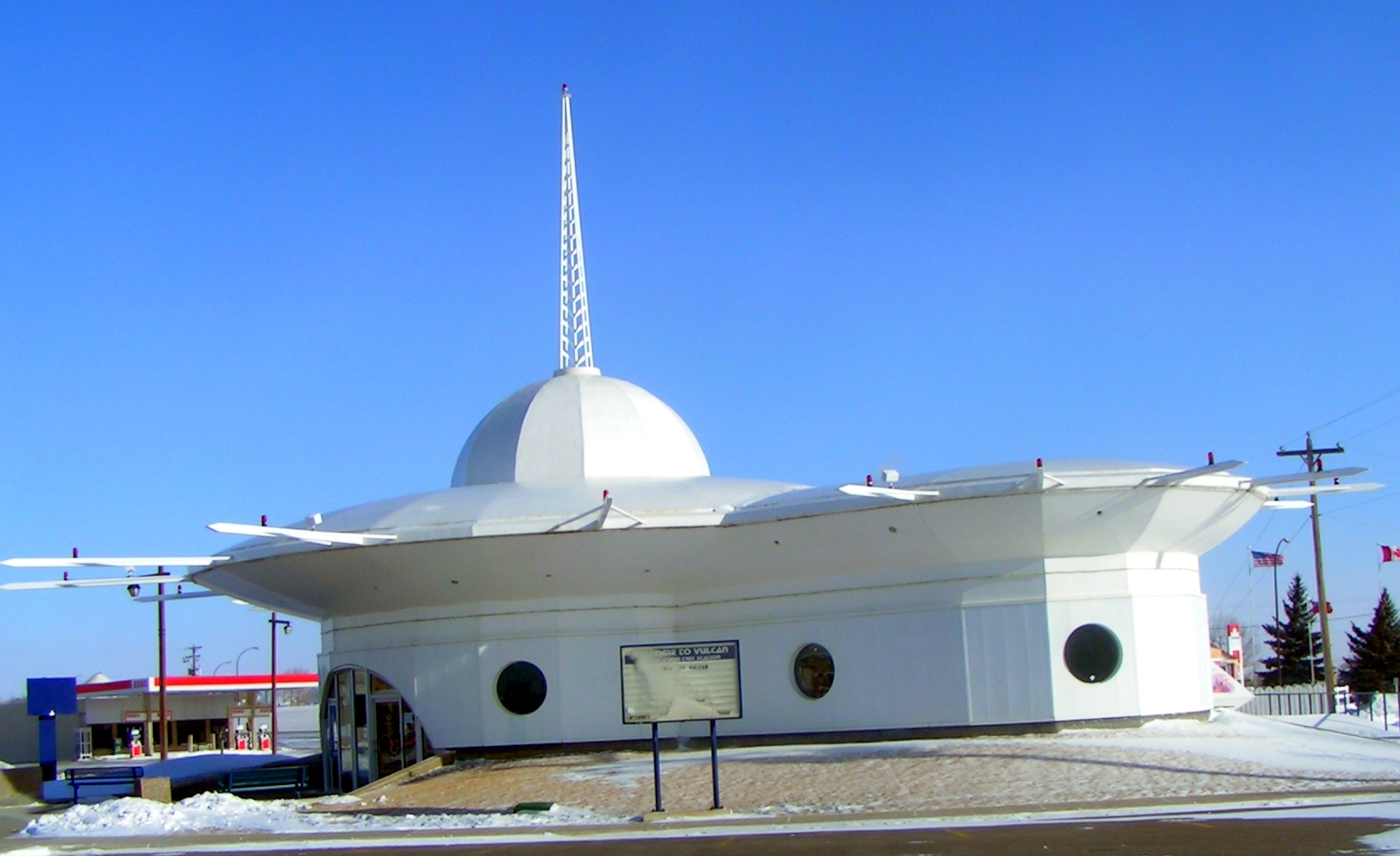
Vulcan

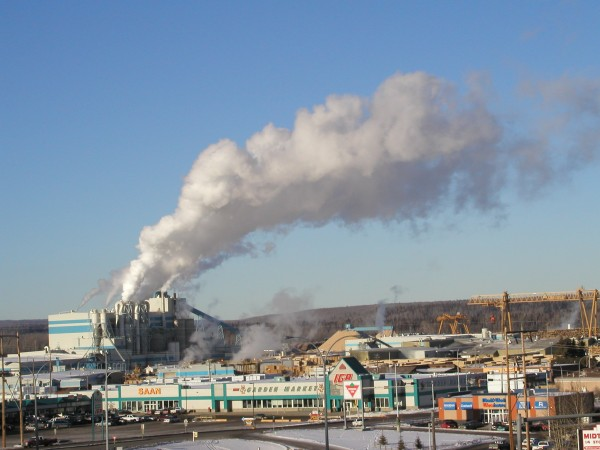
Whitecourt

== See also ==
- List of census divisions of Alberta
- List of cities in Alberta
- List of communities in Alberta
- List of hamlets in Alberta
- List of municipal districts in Alberta
- List of municipalities in Alberta
- List of population centres in Alberta
- List of summer villages in Alberta
- List of villages in Alberta
