= Hoadly =

Hoadly is a surname, derived from the village of West Hoathly in Sussex. Notable people with the surname include:

- Benjamin Hoadly (1676–1761), English clergyman
- Benjamin Hoadly (physician) (1706–1757), English physician and dramatist
- Charles J. Hoadly (1828–1900), American librarian and historian
- George Hoadly (1826–1902), Governor of Ohio
- John Hoadly (1678–1746), English clergyman
- John Hoadly (playwright) (1711–1776), English cleric, poet and dramatist
- Samuel Hoadly (1643–1705), English educator, father of Benjamin and John
- Sarah Hoadly (1676–1743), English portrait painter, wife of Benjamin

== See also ==
- Hoadly, Virginia, United States, an unincorporated community
- Hoadley, another surname
- Hoad, another surname
