= Harry York =

Canadian ice hockey player

- Born: April 16, 1974 (age 52) Ponoka, Alberta, Canada
- Height: 6 ft 1 in (185 cm)
- Weight: 220 lb (100 kg; 15 st 10 lb)
- Position: Centre
- Shot: Left
- Played for: St. Louis Blues; New York Rangers; Pittsburgh Penguins; Vancouver Canucks
- NHL draft: Undrafted
- Playing career: 1995–2000

Harold Cameron York (born April 16, 1974) is a Canadian former professional ice hockey centre who played several seasons in the National Hockey League.

== Playing career ==
Born in Ponoka, Alberta, York was the Alberta Junior Hockey League MVP and leading scorer in 1994–95 while playing for the Fort McMurray Oil Barons, but was not drafted. York caught on with the Nashville Knights of the ECHL the following season. An 83-point campaign for Nashville finally caught the eye of NHL scouts, and he was signed by the St. Louis Blues just before the end of the 1995–96 season, adding 8 goals in 13 games for the Blues' farm team in Worcester.

York would make the Blues' NHL roster in 1996–97 as a complete unknown and surprise everyone by flying out of the gates as one of the NHL's leading rookie scorers. At one point he scored goals in 5 consecutive games and he was named the NHL's Rookie of the Month in November. York spent most of the season as the Blues' #2 Center, playing alongside fellow surprise rookie breakout success Jim Campbell, with the two inexorably linked in the press throughout the season. Although he slowed down somewhat later in the season, he still finished with a solid 14 goals and 32 points on the season, good for 9th on the Blues in scoring.

York returned to the Blues in 1997–98, but struggled to find the scoring touch he showed as a rookie. After scoring just 4 goals and 10 points in 58 games, York was dealt to the New York Rangers for Mike Eastwood late in the season. York's stay in New York was brief, as he was dealt to the Pittsburgh Penguins early in the 1998–99 season after only 7 games for the Rangers and without scoring a point. Likewise, Pittsburgh waived him after only two weeks and two games as a Penguin, and he was claimed by the Vancouver Canucks.

In Vancouver, York was reunited with head coach Mike Keenan, under whom he'd had his greatest success in St. Louis. York returned to form in Vancouver, posting 7 goals and 16 points in 49 games and establishing himself as a solid defensive forward and penalty killer.

In 1999–2000, York recorded 4 goals and 17 points in 54 games for the Canucks. However, his role had diminished under new coach Marc Crawford and, also struggling with concussion problems, he was released by the team at the end of the year effectively ending his NHL career.

York finished his career with 29 goals and 75 points in 244 NHL games, along with 99 penalty minutes.

York is of Cree descent, and during his career was one of several First Nations players in the NHL.

== Career statistics ==
=== Regular season and playoffs ===
			Regular season					Playoffs
Season	Team	League	GP	G	A	Pts	PIM	GP	G	A	Pts	PIM
1992–93	Bonnyville Pontiacs	AJHL	56	28	41	69	39	—	—	—	—	—
1993–94	Bonnyville Pontiacs	AJHL	56	38	62	100	109	—	—	—	—	—
1994–95	Fort McMurray Oil Barons	AJHL	54	36	73	109	126	—	—	—	—	—
1995–96	Nashville Knights	ECHL	64	33	50	83	122	—	—	—	—	—
1995–96	Atlanta Knights	IHL	2	0	0	0	15	—	—	—	—	—
1995–96	Worcester IceCats	AHL	13	8	5	13	2	4	0	4	4	4
1996–97	St. Louis Blues	NHL	74	14	18	32	24	5	0	0	0	2
1997–98	St. Louis Blues	NHL	58	4	6	10	31	—	—	—	—	—
1997–98	New York Rangers	NHL	2	0	0	0	0	—	—	—	—	—
1998–99	New York Rangers	NHL	5	0	0	0	4	—	—	—	—	—
1998–99	Pittsburgh Penguins	NHL	2	0	0	0	0	—	—	—	—	—
1998–99	Vancouver Canucks	NHL	49	7	9	16	20	—	—	—	—	—
1999–00	Vancouver Canucks	NHL	54	4	13	17	20	—	—	—	—	—
1999–00	Syracuse Crunch	AHL	1	0	0	0	15	—	—	—	—	—
NHL totals			244	29	46	75	99	5	0	0	0	2

- All statistics taken from NHL.com

== Awards and achievements ==
- Alberta Junior Hockey League Most Valuable Player (1994–95)
- Alberta Junior Hockey League Leading Scorer (1994–95)
- NHL Rookie of the Month (November, 1996)
