= David Hoadley =

David Hoadley may refer to:

- David Hoadley (architect) (1774–1839), American architect in Connecticut
- David Hoadley (businessman) (1806–1873), American businessman and executive in the banking and railroad industries
- David K. Hoadley (born 1938), first known storm chaser and founder of Storm Track magazine
