= Stephen Hoadley =

English cricketer

Personal information
- Full name: Stephen John Hoadley
- Born: 7 July 1955 (age 71); Pembury, Kent, England
- Batting: Right-handed
- Bowling: Right-arm off break
- Relatives: Simon Hoadley (brother)

Domestic team information
- Years: Team
- 1975–1976: Sussex

Career statistics
Competition	First-class	List A
Matches	7	3
Runs scored	202	13
Batting average	18.36	6.50
100s/50s	–/2	–/–
Top score	58	8
Balls bowled	6	–
Wickets	–	–
Bowling average	–	–
5 wickets in innings	–	–
10 wickets in match	–	–
Best bowling	–	–
Catches/stumpings	3/–	–/–
- Source: Cricinfo, 6 January 2012

Stephen John Hoadley (born 7 July 1955) is a former English cricketer. Hoadley was a right-handed batsman who bowled right-arm off break. He was born at Pembury, Kent.

Hoadley made his first-class debut for Sussex against Warwickshire in the 1975 County Championship. He made six further first-class appearances for the county, the last of which came against Kent in the 1976 County Championship. In his seven first-class matches, he scored a total of 202 runs at an average of 18.36, with a high score of 58. This score was one of two fifties he made and came against Hampshire in 1975. Hoadley also made three List A appearances for Sussex in the 1975 John Player League against Warwickshire, Nottinghamshire and Kent. He scored just 13 runs at an average of 6.50, with a high score of 8 in these three matches.

His brother, Simon, also played first-class and List A cricket for Sussex.
