= Ponoka County =

Municipal district in Alberta, Canada

- Municipal district
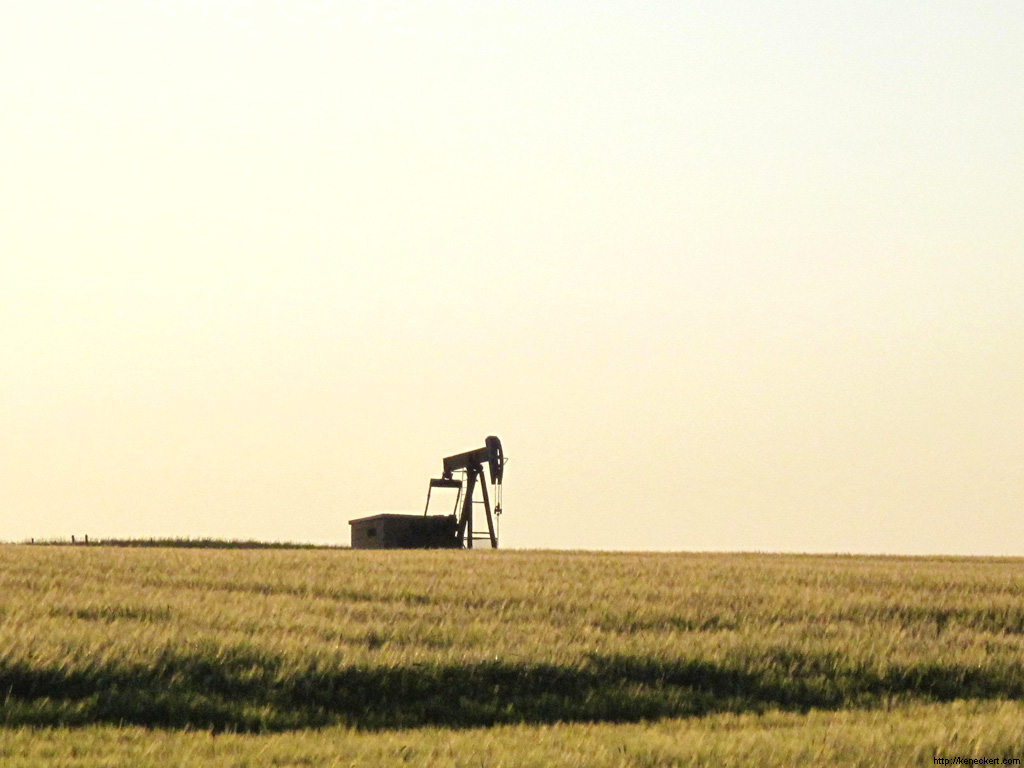
- Pump jack near Ponoka

- Location within Alberta
- Country: Canada
- Province: Alberta
- Region: Central Alberta
- Census division: 8
- Established: 1944
- Incorporated: 1952

Government
  - Reeve: Paul McLauchlin
  - Governing body: Ponoka County Council: Nancy Hartford; Bryce Liddle; Mark Matejka; Paul McLauchlin; Doug Weir
  - CAO: Charlie Cutforth
  - Administrative office: Ponoka
  - MP: Blaine Calkins

Area (2021)
  - Land: 2,807.99 km^{2} (1,084.17 sq mi)

Population (2021)
  - Total: 9,998
  - Density: 3.6/km^{2} (9.3/sq mi)
- Time zone: UTC−06:00 (Alberta Time)
- Website: ponokacounty.com

Ponoka County is a municipal district in Alberta, Canada. It covers 721,396 acres (2,919 km^{2}) and it claims to "embody the essence of rural Alberta".

== History ==
Ponoka County was founded on January 1, 1952. The county's first public officials were Mr. Bruce Ramsey, who directed municipal affairs, Mr. Peter McDonald as secretary-treasurer, and Mr. L.G. Saunders was head of the school system. The town gets its name from the Blackfoot word for Elk.

== Geography ==
=== Communities and localities ===
The following urban municipalities are surrounded by Ponoka County.

Cities

- none

Towns

- Ponoka
- Rimbey

Villages

- none

Summer villages

- Parkland Beach

The following hamlets are located within Ponoka County.

Hamlets

- Bluffton
- Hoadley
- Leedale
- Maskwacis (formerly Hobbema)

The following localities are located within Ponoka County.

Localities

- Alberta Hospital
- Crestomere
- Frank Subdivision
- Homeglen
- Lavesta
- Menaik
- Morning Meadows Subdivision
- Nugent
- Paulson Pasture
- Pleasant Hill Subdivision
- Rimbey Ridge Estates
- Springdale
- Sunnyside
- Tristram
- Viewmar Estates
- Willesden Green
- Woodland Park

== Demographics ==
In the 2021 Census of Population conducted by Statistics Canada, Ponoka County had a population of 9,998 living in 3,689 of its 4,255 total private dwellings, a change of 2% from its 2016 population of 9,806. With a land area of 2,807.99 km^{2} (1,084.17 sq mi), it had a population density of 3.6/km^{2} (9.2/sq mi) in 2021.

In the 2016 Census of Population conducted by Statistics Canada, Ponoka County had a population of 9,806 living in 3,535 of its 4,199 total private dwellings, a 10.7% change from its 2011 population of 8,856. With a land area of 2,814.26 km^{2} (1,086.59 sq mi), it had a population density of 3.5/km^{2} (9.0/sq mi) in 2016.

== Government ==
The chief administrative officer (CAO) of Ponoka County is Charlie Cutforth. The five members of council, Nancy Hartford, Bryce Liddle, Mark Matejka, Paul McLauchlin, and Doug Weir, were elected October 21, 2013. Councillor Paul McLauchlin, from electoral division 4, was selected the reeve in a 2013 organizational meeting.

== See also ==
- List of communities in Alberta
- List of municipal districts in Alberta
