= Simon Hoadley =

English cricketer

Personal information
- Full name: Simon Peter Hoadley
- Born: 16 August 1956 (age 70); Eridge, Sussex, England
- Batting: Right-handed
- Bowling: Right-arm off break
- Relatives: Stephen Hoadley (brother)

Domestic team information
- Years: Team
- 1978–1979: Sussex

Career statistics
Competition	First-class	List A
Matches	12	3
Runs scored	329	17
Batting average	17.31	8.50
100s/50s	1/1	–/–
Top score	112	17
Balls bowled	–	–
Wickets	–	–
Bowling average	–	–
5 wickets in innings	–	–
10 wickets in match	–	–
Best bowling	–	–
Catches/stumpings	5/–	–/–
- Source: Cricinfo, 6 January 2012

Simon Peter Hoadley (born 16 August 1956) is a former English cricketer. Hoadley was a right-handed batsman who bowled right-arm off break. He was born at Eridge, Sussex.

Hoadley made his first-class debut for Sussex against the touring New Zealanders in 1978. He made eleven further first-class appearances for the county, the last of which came against Somerset in the 1979 County Championship. In his twelve first-class matches, he scored a total of 329 runs at an average of 17.31, with a high score of 112. This score was his only first-class century and came against Glamorgan in 1978. Hoadley also made three List A appearances for Sussex in the 1978 John Player League against Yorkshire, Warwickshire and Middlesex. He scored just 17 runs at an average of 8.50, with a high score of 17 in these three matches.

His brother, Stephen, also played first-class and List A cricket for Sussex.
