= George Hoadley =

George Hoadley may refer to:

- George Hoadley (Ohio politician) (1781–1857), mayor of New Haven, Connecticut, and Cleveland, Ohio
- George Hoadley (Alberta politician) (1866–1955), provincial politician and rancher from Alberta, Canada

== See also ==
- George Hoadly (1826–1902), Democratic politician, 36th Governor of Ohio
- George Hoadley Jr. House, a historic house in Cincinnati, Ohio
