= Hoadley, Alberta =

Hoadley
- Hamlet
- Location of Hoadley Hoadley (Canada)
- Coordinates: 52°50′49″N 114°22′21″W
- Country: Canada
- Province: Alberta
- Region: Central Alberta
- Census division: 8
- Municipal district: Ponoka County

Government
  - Type: Unincorporated
  - Governing body: Ponoka County Council

Population (1991)
  - Total: 9
- Time zone: UTC−06:00 (Alberta Time)
- Area codes: 403, 587, 825

Hoadley is a hamlet in central Alberta, Canada within Ponoka County. It is located on Highway 20, approximately 69 kilometres (43 mi) west of Wetaskiwin.

== History ==
The community name was established as a watering stop on the now defunct Lacombe and Blindman Valley Electric Railway –built in 1917–19. It was named after George Hoadley Member of the Legislative Assembly of Alberta from 1909 to 1930.

== Demographics ==
Hoadley recorded a population of 9 in the 1991 Census of Population conducted by Statistics Canada.

== See also ==
- List of communities in Alberta
- List of hamlets in Alberta
