= Rimbey =

- Town
- Town of Rimbey
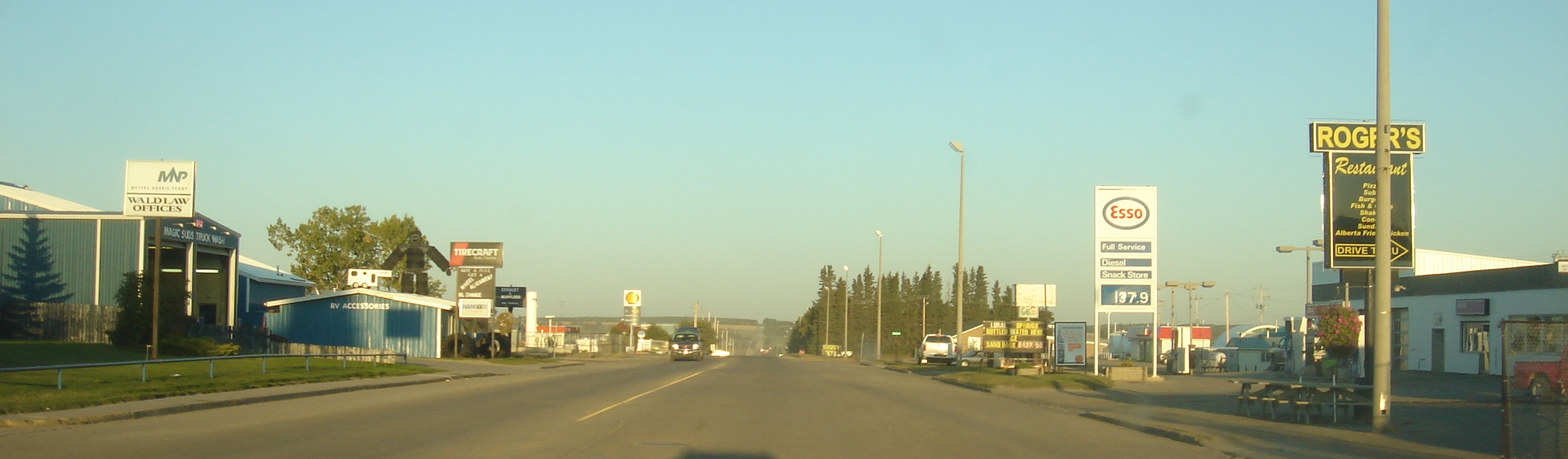
- Mainstreet Rimbey
- Motto: The friendly international town
- Location of Rimbey in Alberta
- Coordinates: 52°38′21″N 114°14′12″W
- Country: Canada
- Province: Alberta
- Region: Central Alberta
- Census division: 8
- Municipal district: Ponoka County
- Incorporated
  - Village: June 13, 1919
  - Town: December 13, 1948

Government
  - Mayor: Rick Pankiw
  - Governing body: Rimbey Town Council
  - MP: Blaine Calkins

Area (2021)
  - Land: 11.38 km^{2} (4.39 sq mi)
- Elevation: 930 m (3,050 ft)

Population (2021)
  - Total: 2,470
  - Density: 217.1/km^{2} (562/sq mi)
- Time zone: UTC−06:00 (Alberta Time)
- Postal code span: T0C 2J0
- Area code: +1-403
- Highways: Highway 20; Highway 53
- Waterways: Gull Lake
- Website: Official website

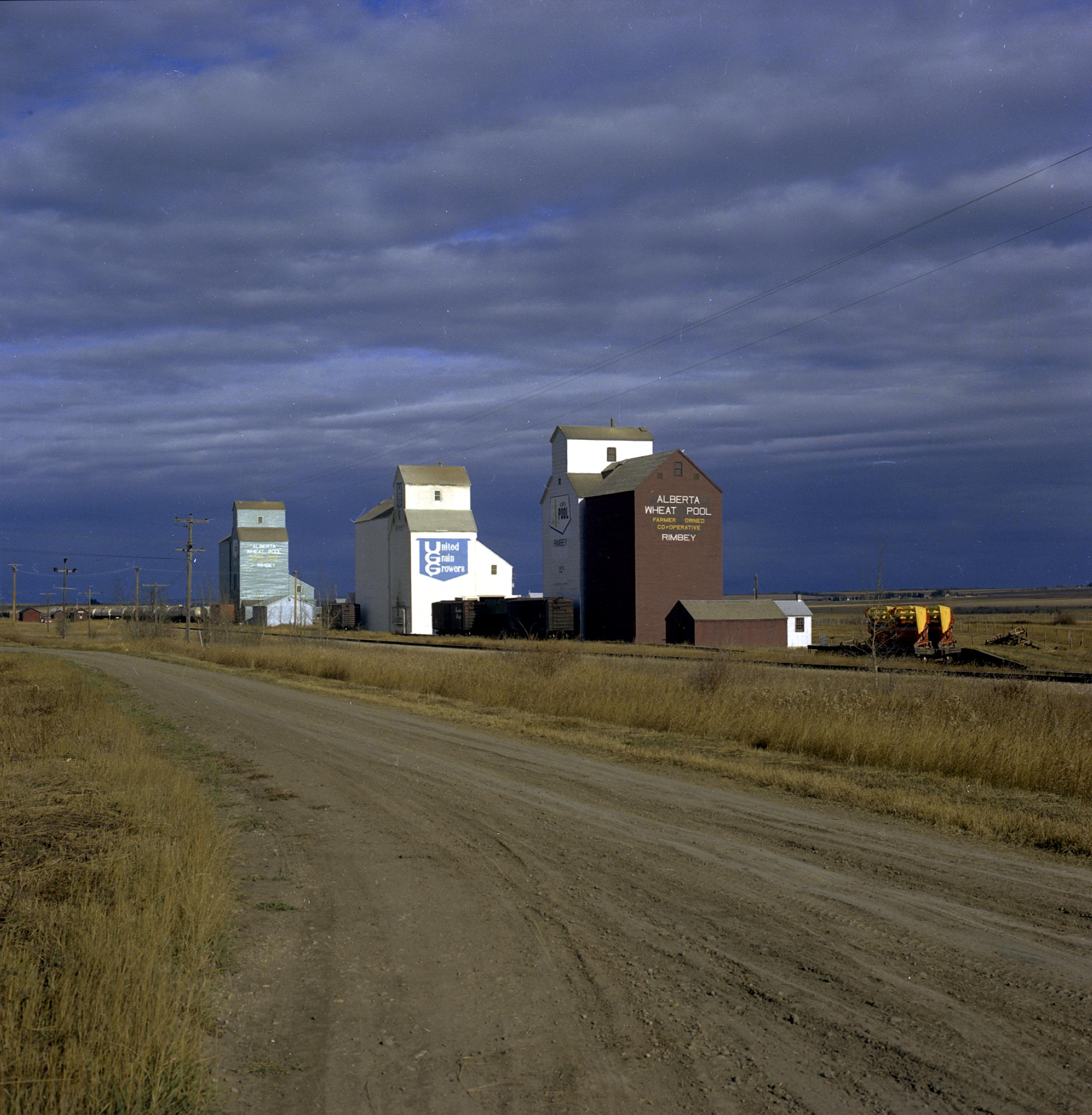
Grain elevators, 1974

Rimbey /ˈrɪmbiː/ is a town in central Alberta, Canada. It is located at the junction of Highways 20 and 53 in the Blindman River valley area approximately 62 kilometres (39 mi) northwest of Red Deer and 145 kilometres (90 mi) southwest of Edmonton.

Provincially, Rimbey is part of the Rimbey-Rocky Mountain House-Sundre electoral district and federally in the Ponoka—Didsbury riding.

== History ==
Officially made a community in 1902, the first name given to the settlement at the turn of the century was Kansas Ridge as many of the settlers originated from the American state of Kansas. Among them were the three Rimbey brothers (Sam, Ben, and Jim) for whom the town was officially named after in 1904. The Rimbeys moved to Canada from Scott County, Illinois having moved to Illinois in the 1830s from Maryland. They were born in Pennsylvania.

In 1919 the Lacombe and Blindman Valley Electric Railway (later part of the Canadian Pacific Railway) reached Rimbey, and there was much enthusiasm for the "new town" by the tracks (now Highway 20). Two grain companies built elevators the following year and Rimbey's population swelled to 319 by 1921.

The Second World War brought abrupt changes to Rimbey, as young men and sometimes their families left the village. When war was over some returned and others did not. Many new faces came to Rimbey and the population surged to 634 by 1946.

== Demographics ==
In the 2021 Census of Population conducted by Statistics Canada, the Town of Rimbey had a population of 2,470 living in 1,084 of its 1,180 total private dwellings, a change of −3.8% from its 2016 population of 2,567. With a land area of 11.38 km^{2} (4.39 sq mi), it had a population density of 217.0/km^{2} (562.2/sq mi) in 2021.

In the 2016 Census of Population conducted by Statistics Canada, the Town of Rimbey recorded a population of 2,567 living in 1,077 of its 1,160 total private dwellings, a 7.9% change from its 2011 population of 2,378. With a land area of 11.4 km^{2} (4.4 sq mi), it had a population density of 225.2/km^{2} (583.2/sq mi) in 2016.

== Economy ==
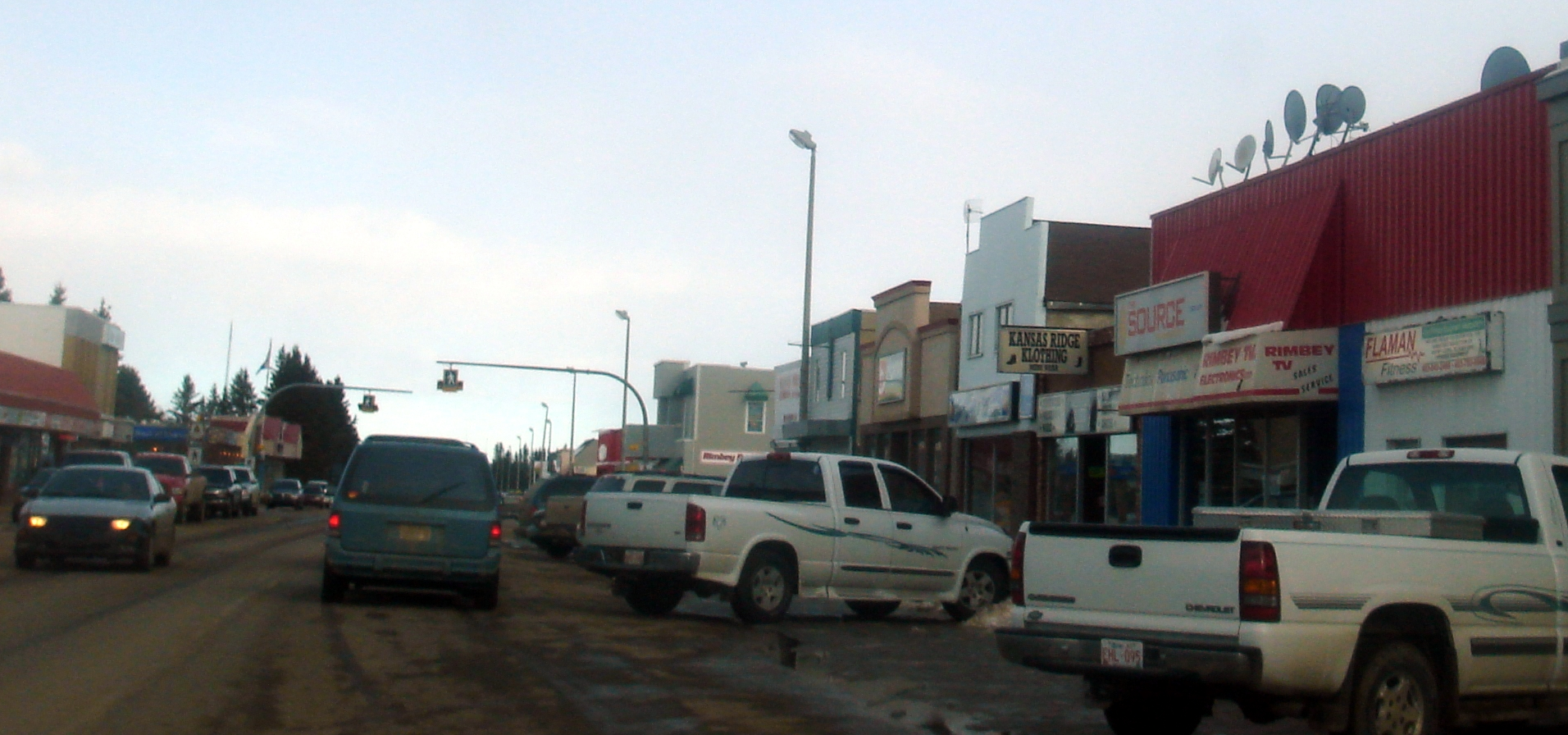
Store fronts in Rimbey

Rimbey is mainly a farming community, with the oil and gas sector increasing in importance.

The town has full amenities including hotels, motels, several grocery, convenience stores, liquor stores, canabbis stores and a campground. Rimbey has its own hospital and ambulance (although more specialized procedures are sent to Red Deer, Calgary or Edmonton) and its own detachment of the Royal Canadian Mounted Police.

=== Attractions ===
Pas-Ka-Poo Park includes large open lawns, a historical village site, museums and a wide array of interesting displays, including the World's Largest Collection of International Trucks in the Smithson International Truck Museum.

The Rimbey Golf & Trailer Park was located 1.5 kilometres (0.93 mi) south. The golf course has since been closed down, due to flooding.

The town had an outdoor swimming pool open from May to September every year, which has been rebuilt as a 3,900 ft^{2} (360 m^{2}) junior olympic pool with a beach entrance, two hot tubs, a double loop waterslide and a 2,100 ft^{2} (200 m^{2}) splash pad for toddlers up to 15 years of age.

The Beatty House is a historical house in the centre of town and can be booked for tours or to house social events.

There are also a couple of smaller public parks (designed for children) around town.

The town of Rimbey is also home to Central Alberta Raceways, just outside of town. It has an 1/8th mile drag strip, 3/8ths mile dirt oval and mud bog pits.

== Education ==
Operated by the Wolf Creek School Division No. 72, the Rimbey Elementary School, the Rimbey Junior-Senior High School, and the West Country Outreach School provide education within Rimbey. The town is also home to the Rimbey Christian School, a private school that offers learning for students in K-9. The Rimbey Nursery School offers play-based programs for children 3 to 5 years old.

== Media ==
The town newspaper is the Rimbey Review. The Review commenced publishing on January 27, 1997 and was owned by Sylvan Lake News. The paper was sold to Black Press in 2005. The Rimbey Review succeeded the Rimbey Record, which had been publishing since the early 1930s. The Record was cited, in 1937, for its assistance in a series for the Edmonton Journal, which won that paper a Pulitzer prize. The Rimbey Record was, at its demise, part of a chain of newspapers, under the banner Record Publishing that failed financially after an unsuccessful attempt to go public. The town had one radio station VF8020 on 93.3 MHz, which was owned by The Church of Nazarene of Rimbey.

== Notable people ==
- Harry Lang, professional wrestler best known as Cowboy Lang
- Jeffrey Bowyer-Chapman, actor

== See also ==
- List of communities in Alberta
- List of towns in Alberta
