= Parkland Beach, Alberta =

Parkland Beach
- Summer village
- Summer Village of Parkland Beach
- Location of Parkland Beach in Alberta
- Coordinates: 52.60760°N 114.06662°W
- Country: Canada
- Province: Alberta
- Census division: No. 8

Government
  - Type: Municipal incorporation
  - Mayor: Blair Morton
  - Governing body: Parkland Beach Summer Village Council

Area (2021)
  - Land: 0.94 km^{2} (0.36 sq mi)

Population (2021)
  - Total: 168
  - Density: 179.4/km^{2} (465/sq mi)
- Time zone: UTC−06:00 (Alberta Time)
- Website: Official website

Parkland Beach is a summer village in Alberta, Canada. It is located on the northern shore of Gull Lake, southeast of Rimbey.

== Demographics ==
In the 2021 Census of Population conducted by Statistics Canada, the Summer Village of Parkland Beach had a population of 168 living in 85 of its 232 total private dwellings, a change of 9.8% from its 2016 population of 153. Its population density in 2021 was 178.7/km2 (462.9/sq mi), with a land area of 0.94 km2 (0.36 sq mi).

In the 2016 Census of Population conducted by Statistics Canada, the Summer Village of Parkland Beach had a population of 153 living in 68 of its 213 total private dwellings, a 23.4% change from its 2011 population of 124. With a land area of 0.95 km^{2} (0.37 sq mi), it had a population density of 161.1/km^{2} (417.1/sq mi) in 2016.

== See also ==
- List of communities in Alberta
- List of francophone communities in Alberta
- List of summer villages in Alberta
- List of resort villages in Saskatchewan
