= Ponoka, Alberta =

Town in Alberta, Canada

Ponoka
- Town
- Town of Ponoka
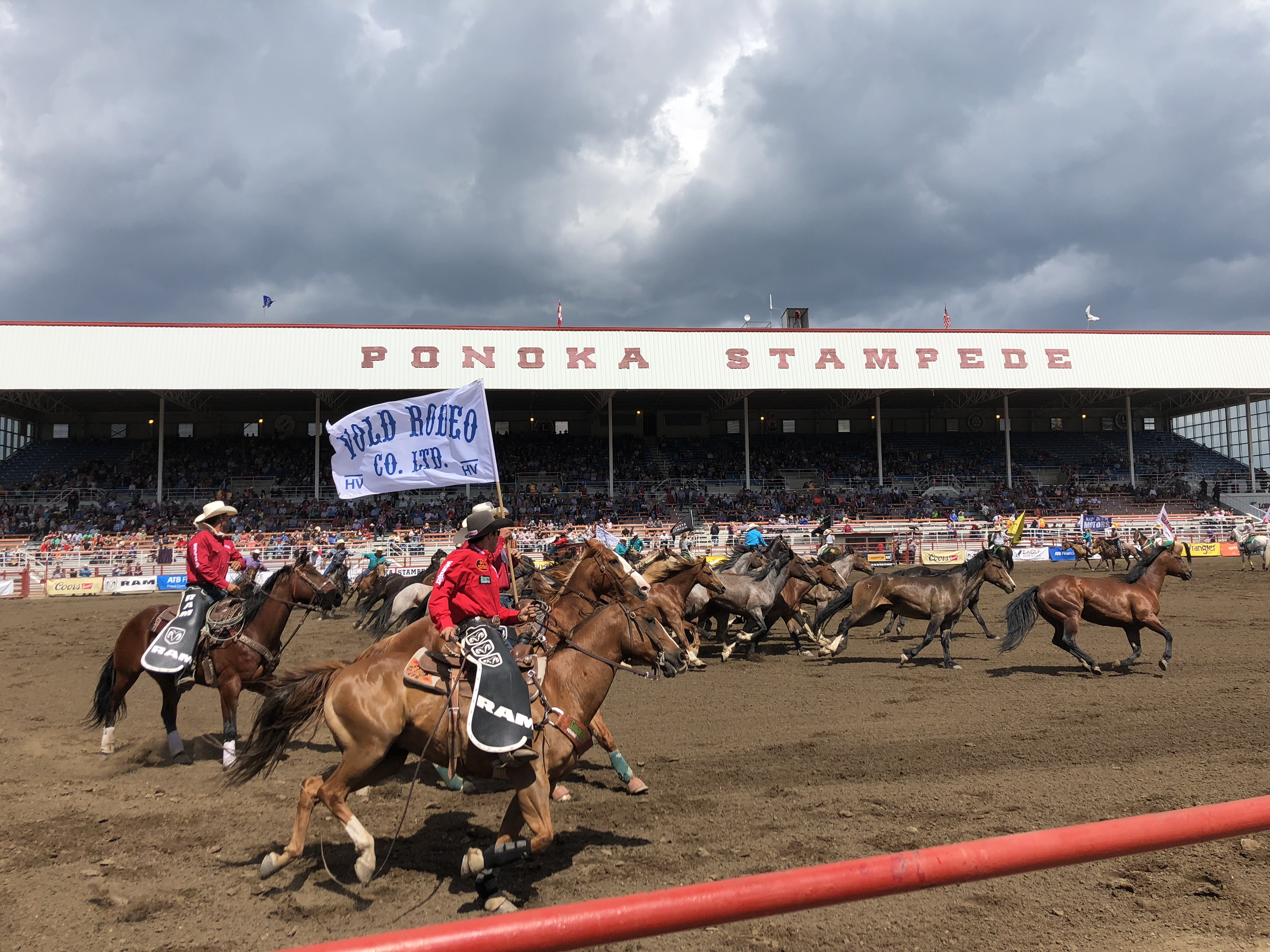
- 2018 Ponoka Stampede

- Location within Alberta Location within Canada
- Coordinates: 52°40′32″N 113°34′49″W
- Country: Canada
- Province: Alberta
- Region: Central Alberta
- Census division: 8
- Municipal district: Ponoka County
- Incorporated
  - Village: October 19, 1900
  - Town: October 15, 1904

Government
  - Mayor: Kevin Ferguson
  - Governing body: Ponoka Town Council
  - MP: Blaine Calkins (Conservative)
  - MLA: Jennifer Johnson (United Conservative)

Area (2021)
  - Land: 17.22 km^{2} (6.65 sq mi)
- Elevation: 807 m (2,648 ft)

Population (2021)
  - Total: 7,331
  - Density: 425.8/km^{2} (1,103/sq mi)
- Time zone: UTC−06:00 (Alberta Time)
- Forward sortation area: T4J
- Area codes: +1-403, +1-587
- Highways: Highway 2A; Highway 53
- Waterway: Battle River
- Website: Official website

Ponoka /pəˈnoʊkə/ is a town in central Alberta, Canada. It is located at the junction of Highway 2A and Highway 53, 59 kilometres (37 mi) north of Red Deer and 95 kilometres (59 mi) south of Edmonton.

The name Ponoka is Blackfoot for "elk", which is the animal depicted in the town flag. Ponoka County's municipal office is located in Ponoka.

== History ==
The town of Ponoka originated in 1891 as a waypoint for the railway from Edmonton to Calgary; the town was formally incorporated in 1904.

== Demographics ==
In the 2021 Census of Population conducted by Statistics Canada, the Town of Ponoka had a population of 7,331 living in 3,086 of its 3,340 total private dwellings, a change of 1.4% from its 2016 population of 7,229. With a land area of 17.22 km^{2} (6.65 sq mi), it had a population density of 425.7/km^{2} (1,102.6/sq mi) in 2021.

In the 2016 Census of Population conducted by Statistics Canada, the Town of Ponoka recorded a population of 7,229 living in 3,010 of its 3,301 total private dwellings, a 6.7% change from its 2011 population of 6,778. With a land area of 17.33 km^{2} (6.69 sq mi), it had a population density of 417.1/km^{2} (1,080.4/sq mi) in 2016.

== Economy ==
Industries are agriculture (grain and cattle production) and oil and gas production.

== Arts and culture ==
Ponoka is home to the Ponoka Stampede, a seven-day rodeo held at the end of June or beginning of July, usually coinciding with the Canada Day long weekend. This annual event is part of the Canadian Professional Rodeo Association's professional tour, and features a midway and other activities. The Ponoka Stampede is a stop for the World Professional Chuckwagon Association and the All Pro Canadian Chuckwagons.

== Attractions ==
The Wolf Creek Trail starts at the southern end of Ponoka near the Ponoka Community Golf Course and travels northwards along the Battle River for several kilometres. Informational signs are posted along the trail featuring descriptions of various local wild animals and historical facts. Several baseball diamonds, benches and picnic tables are also located along the trail.

Lions Centennial Park is a major park located along the west side of Highway 2A. It features a pond with a dock, several bathroom facilities, a stage, "The World's Largest Bucking Saddle Bronc and Rider", the Centennial Time Capsule, several gazebos with picnic tables and the Fort Ostell Museum, as well as a splash park.

== Notable people ==
- Jim Butterfield, computing author
- Marcel Comeau, ice hockey coach and National Hockey League team executive
- Harry York, former professional hockey player
- Maddison Pearman, Olympic long track speed skater
- Sir Richard Nelson, RAF Air-Marshal

== Infrastructure ==
Health care facilities in Ponoka include the Ponoka Hospital and Care Centre, the Centennial Centre for Mental Health and Brain Injury, the Northcott Care Centre, and the Rimoka Housing Facility. The Ponoka Hospital and Care Centre is responsible for general health care, while the Centennial Centre serves as a care and treatment facility for mental health and is known for its brain injury program (the Halvar Jonson Centre for Brain Injury). The Northcott Care Centre, Rimoka Housing Facility and Seasons Retirement Community all care for the elderly, with the Northcott Care Centre focusing on care for people with disabilities and Seasons providing supportive living care.

== Services ==
Fire service is provided by the Ponoka County Volunteer Fire Department. Policing is the responsibility of the Ponoka Royal Canadian Mounted Police (RCMP) Detachment. General bylaw enforcement is undertaken by the town's special constable in collaboration with the RCMP.

== See also ==
- List of communities in Alberta
- List of towns in Alberta
