= List of Alberta provincial highways =

Alberta Provincial Highway Network
- Standard highway markers for Alberta

- Alberta's official provincial highway network as of April 2025

System information
- Maintained by the Ministry of Transportation and Economic Corridors
- Length: 31,400 km (19,500 mi)

Highway names
- Provincial Highways: Alberta Highway XX

System links
- Alberta Numbered Highway Network; List; Former

The Canadian province of Alberta has a provincial highway network consisting of over 31,400 kilometres (19,500 mi) of roads as of 2021-2022, of which 28,000 kilometres (17,000 mi) have been paved.

All of Alberta's provincial highways are maintained by the Ministry of Transportation and Economic Corridors, a department of the Government of Alberta. The network includes two distinct series of numbered highways:

- The 1–216 series (formerly known as primary highways), making up Alberta's core highway network—typically paved and with the highest traffic volume
- The 500–986 series, providing more local and rural access, with a higher proportion of gravel surfaces

== 1–216 series ==
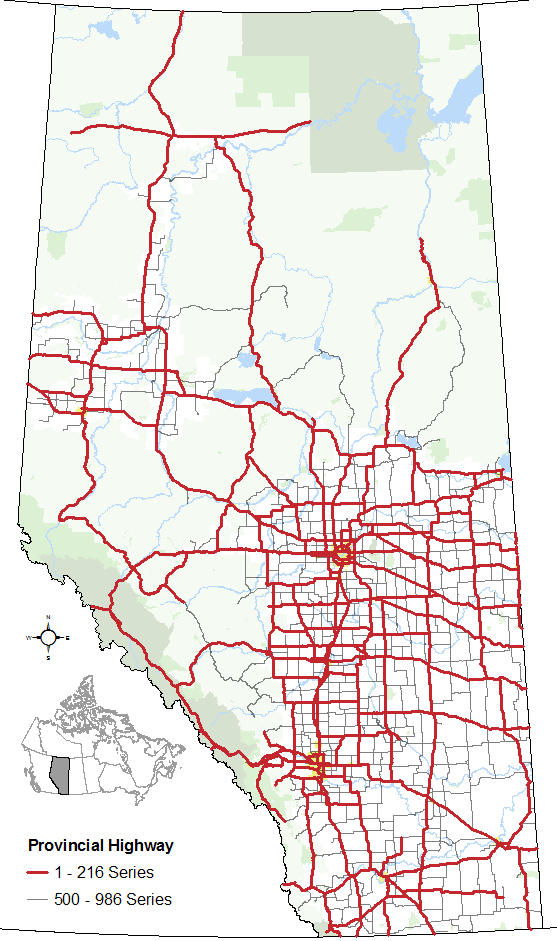
The 1 – 216 series of highways within Alberta’s provincial highway system as of 2016

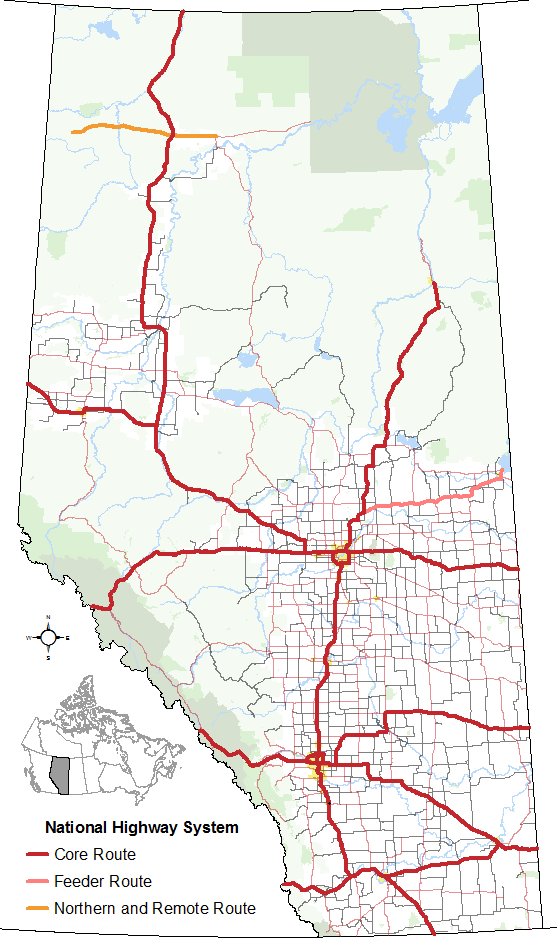
The highways within Alberta’s provincial highway system that are designated segments of Canada's National Highway System

Alberta's 1 to 216 series of provincial highways are Alberta's main highways. They are numbered from 1 to 100, with the exception of the ring roads around Calgary and Edmonton, which are numbered 201 and 216 respectively. The numbers applied to these highways are derived from compounding the assigned numbers of the core north–south and east–west highways that intersect with the rings roads. In Calgary, Highway 201 is derived from the north-south Highway 2 and the east-west Highway 1. In Edmonton, Highway 216 is derived from the same north-south Highway 2 and the east-west Highway 16.

Within this series, all or portions of Highways 1, 2, 3, 4, 9, 15, 16, 28, 28A, 35, 43, 49, 63, 201 and 216 are designated core routes of Canada's National Highway System (NHS). Highway 28 from Highway 63 to Cold Lake is designated a NHS feeder route and Highway 58 between Rainbow Lake and Highway 88 is designated a NHS northern/remote route.

Highways 1, 2, 3, 4, 16, and 43 are considered Alberta's most important interprovincial and international highways and are divided highways for much or all of their length. Speed limits are generally 110 km/h (68 mph) divided highways/freeways and 100 km/h (62 mph) on others, while segments of Highway 1 and Highway 16 through the national parks within Alberta's Rockies have speed limits varying between 70 and 90 km/h (43–56 mph).

The Highway 15/28A/28/63 corridor between Edmonton and Fort McMurray is considered one of Alberta's most important intraprovincial highways. It is vital to the oilsands operation.

The vast majority of the highways within the 1 to 216 series of highways are two-laned and paved, while Highways 1, 2, 3, 4, 11, 15, 16, 43, 60, 63, 100, 201, and 216 are twinned (expressways) for most of their length. Only four highways within the series have segments that remained gravelled. These include segments of Highways 40, 58, and 68 and a short segment near the northern terminus of Highway 63.

Highways 1 and 16 are Trans-Canada Highway routes and are signed with TCH shields, not standard provincial shields.

Number	Length (km)	Length (mi)	Southern or western terminus	Northern or eastern terminus	Local names	Formed	Removed	Notes
Highway 1 (TCH)	534	332	Highway 1 (TCH) at the British Columbia border at Kicking Horse Pass	Highway 1 (TCH) at the Saskatchewan border east of Walsh	Trans-Canada Highway	c. 1941	current	Signed with Trans-Canada Highway shield; passes through Banff, Calgary, and Medicine Hat.
Highway 1A	51	32	Highway 1 (TCH) at Lake Louise	Highway 1 (TCH) west of Banff	Bow Valley Parkway	—	—	Former section of Highway 1.
Highway 1A	89	55	Highway 1 (TCH) in Canmore	Highway 1 (TCH) in Calgary	Bow Valley Trail	c. 1957	current	Former section of Highway 1.
Highway 2	1273	791	US 89 at the U.S. (Montana) border at Carway	Highway 43 north of Grande Prairie	Queen Elizabeth II Highway (Airdrie–Edmonton); Deerfoot Trail (Calgary); Northern Woods and Water Route (Athabasca–Donnelly)	c. 1941	current	Passes through Calgary, Edmonton, Peace River, and Red Deer.
Highway 2A	46	29	Highway 23 in High River	Highway 201 in Calgary		c. 1960	current	Former section of Highway 2.
Highway 2A	229	142	Highway 2 / Highway 72 east of Crossfield	Highway 2 in Leduc		1954	current	Former section of Highway 2; passes through Red Deer
Highway 2A	15	9.3	Highway 2 south of Hondo	Smith		—	—	Former section of Highway 2.
Highway 2A	27	17	Highway 2 west of High Prairie	Highway 49 south of Guy		—	—	Former section of Highway 2.
Highway 2A	11	6.8	Highway 2 west of Peace River	Highway 2 in Grimshaw		—	—	Former section of Highway 2.
Highway 3	324	201	Highway 3 at the British Columbia border at Crowsnest Pass	Highway 1 (TCH) / Highway 41A in Medicine Hat	Crowsnest Highway	1926	current	Signed with Crowsnest Highway shield; passes through Lethbridge.
Highway 3A	4	2.5	Highway 3 at Lundbreck Falls	Highway 3 at Lundbreck		1967	current	Former section of Highway 3; unsigned.
Highway 3A	8	5.0	Highway 3 west of Monarch	Highway 3 / Highway 23 east of Monarch		1996	current	Former section of Highway 3.
Highway 3A	0.65	0.40	Highway 3 east of Coalhurst	Lethbridge city limits	Westside Drive	1967	current	Former section of Highway 3; unsigned.
Highway 3A	7	4.3	Business route through Barnwell			1998	current	Former section of Highway 3; unsigned.
Highway 4	103	64	I-15 at the U.S. (Montana) border at Coutts	Highway 3 in Lethbridge		1926	current	
Highway 5	129	80	Waterton Park	Highway 3 in Lethbridge	Cowboy Trail (Waterton Lakes N.P–Cardston)	1926	current	
Highway 6	74	46	MT 17 at the U.S. (Montana) border at Chief Mountain	Highway 3 at Pincher Station	Cowboy Trail (Waterton Lakes N.P–Pincher Station)	1926	current	
Highway 7	26	16	Highway 22 in Black Diamond	Highway 2 / Highway 547 at Aldersyde		—	—	
Highway 8	31	19	Highway 22 north of Redwood Meadows	Highway 2 in Calgary	Glenmore Trail	—	—	9 km (5.6 mi) section in Calgary between Stoney Trail on the west and east sides (Highway 201) is unsigned.
Highway 9	324	201	Highway 1 (TCH) / Highway 797 north of Langdon	Highway 7 at the Saskatchewan border at Alsask, SK		—	—	
Highway 10	23	14	Highway 9 / Highway 56 in Drumheller	Highway 564 / Highway 569 east of East Coulee	Hoo Doo Trail	—	—	Entire route is in the Town of Drumheller.
Highway 11	318	198	Highway 93 at Saskatchewan River Crossing	Highway 12 east of Nevis	David Thompson Highway	—	—	Passes through Red Deer.
Highway 11A	12	7.5	Highway 11 / Highway 756 west of Rocky Mountain House	Highway 11 / Highway 22 / Highway 598 in Rocky Mountain House		—	—	Former section of Highway 11.
Highway 11A	17	11	Highway 20 in Sylvan Lake	Highway 2A in Red Deer		c. 1987	current	Former section of Highway 11.
Highway 12	364	226	Highway 22 north of Rocky Mountain House	Highway 51 at the Saskatchewan border at Compeer		—	—	
Highway 12A	9	5.6	Highway 12 at Bentley	Highway 12 at Gull Lake		2017	current	Former section of Highway 12.
Highway 13	366	227	Alder Flats	Highway 14 at the Saskatchewan border east of Hayter		—	—	
Highway 13A	7	4.3	Highway 13 at Westerose	Highway 13 east of Ma-Me-O Beach		c. 2000s	current	Former Highway 13 through Ma-Me-O Beach.
Highway 13A	8	5.0	Camrose bypass		Camrose Drive	1988	current	Maintained by the City of Camrose.
Highway 14	257	160	Highway 2 in Edmonton	Highway 40 at the Saskatchewan border west of Marsden, SK	Poundmaker Trail	—	—	
Highway 15	93	58	Highway 16 (TCH) in Edmonton	Highway 16 (TCH) / Highway 855 south of Mundare		1940	current	Former section of Highway 16.
Highway 16 (TCH)	634	394	Highway 16 (TCH) at the British Columbia border at Yellowhead Pass	Highway 16 (TCH) at the Saskatchewan border in Lloydminster	Yellowhead Highway; Trans-Canada Highway	—	—	Signed with Trans-Canada Highway shield; cosigned with Yellowhead Highway shield; passes through Jasper, Edmonton, and Lloydminster.
Highway 16A	14	8.7	Highway 16 (TCH) west of Evansburg	Highway 16 (TCH) / Highway 22 at Entwistle		—	—	Former section of Highway 16.
Highway 16A	33	21	Highway 16 (TCH) west of Stony Plain	Highway 216 in Edmonton	Parkland Highway	1997	current	Former section of Highway 16.
Highway 16A	9	5.6	Business route through Vegreville			1986	current	Former section of Highway 16.
Highway 17	134	83	Saskatchewan border in Dillberry Lake Provincial Park	Highway 641 near Onion Lake		c. 1940s	current	Runs along the Alberta-Saskatchewan border; cosigned with SK 17.
Highway 18	161	100	Highway 43 at Green Court	Highway 63 / Highway 656 near Thorhild		—	—	
Highway 19	12	7.5	Highway 60 at Devon	Highway 2 / Highway 625 at Nisku		c. 1982	current	
Highway 20	110	68	Highway 11 in Sylvan Lake	Highway 39 at Alsike		—	—	
Highway 20A	2	1.2	Highway 53 in Rimbey	Highway 20 north of Rimbey		—	—	Former Highway 20.
Highway 21	328	204	Highway 1 (TCH) east of Strathmore	Highway 15 in Fort Saskatchewan		—	—	
Highway 22	574	357	Highway 3 west of Lundbreck	Highway 18 north of Mayerthorpe	Cowboy Trail	—	—	
Highway 23	138	86	Highway 3 near Monarch	Highway 2A in High River		—	—	
Highway 24	69	43	Highway 23 / Highway 542 north of Vulcan	Highway 1 (TCH) north of Cheadle		—	—	
Highway 25	72	45	Highway 3 in Lethbridge	Highway 526 west of Enchant		—	—	
Highway 26	82	51	Highway 13 in Camrose	Highway 14 west of Kinsella		c. 1970s	current	
Highway 27	150	93	Highway 22 / Highway 584 in Sundre	Highway 9 / Highway 56 east of Morrin		—	—	
Highway 28	293	182	Highway 16 (TCH) in Edmonton	Cold Lake		—	—	
Highway 28A	18	11	Highway 15 in Edmonton	Highway 28 at Gibbons		c. 1980s	current	Former section of Highway 37.
Highway 29	152	94	Highway 15 west of Lamont	Highway 41 east of St. Paul		2006	current	
Highway 31	4	2.5	Highway 16 (TCH) east of Gainford	Highway 759 at Seba Beach		—	—	
Highway 32	147	91	Highway 16 (TCH) west of Carrot Creek	Highway 33 at Swan Hills		—	—	
Highway 33	219	136	Highway 43 east of Gunn	Highway 2 east of Kinuso	Grizzly Trail	—	—	
Highway 35	465	289	Highway 2 north of Grimshaw	Highway 1 at the N.W.T. border north of Indian Cabins	Mackenzie Highway	—	—	Signed with Mackenzie Highway shield.
Highway 36	681	423	Highway 4 at Warner	Highway 55 at Lac La Biche	Veterans Memorial Highway	—	—	
Highway 37	67	42	Highway 43 west of Onoway	Highway 15 west of Fort Saskatchewan		—	—	
Highway 38	25	16	Highway 28 at Redwater	Highway 45 north of Bruderheim		—	—	
Highway 39	91	57	Highway 22 east of Drayton Valley	Highway 2 in Leduc		—	—	
Highway 40	3.8	2.4	Highway 3 at Coleman	Forestry Trunk Road at the Municipality of Crowsnest Pass boundary	Forestry Trunk Road	—	—	
Highway 40	104	65	Highway 541 / Forestry Trunk Road west of Longview	Highway 1 (TCH) south of Seebe	Kananaskis Trail	—	—	Annually closed between Peter Lougheed Provincial Park and Highway 541 from December 1 – June 14.
Highway 40	46	29	Highway 1A near Ghost Lake	Highway 579 / Forestry Trunk Road west of Water Valley	Forestry Trunk Road	—	—	
Highway 40	434	270	Highway 734 at Lovett River	Highway 43 in Grande Prairie	Bighorn Highway	—	—	
Highway 41	688	428	S-232 at the U.S. (Montana) border at Wild Horse	Highway 55 at La Corey	Buffalo Trail	—	—	
Highway 41A	15	9.3	Highway 1 (TCH) / Highway 3 at Medicine Hat	Highway 41 east of Medicine Hat		—	—	Former Highway 41.
Highway 42	44	27	Highway 2A / Highway 592 at Penhold	Highway 21 west of Lousana		—	—	
Highway 43	495	308	Highway 2 at the British Columbia border near Demmitt	Highway 16 (TCH) at Manly Corner		c. 1940s	current	Passes through Grande Prairie.
Highway 44	171	106	Highway 16 (TCH) west of Acheson	Highway 2 near Hondo		—	—	
Highway 45	231	144	Highway 15 south of Bruderheim	Highway 3 at the Saskatchewan border near Alcurve		—	—	
Highway 47	60	37	Highway 40 at Coalspur	Highway 16 (TCH) west of Edson		—	—	
Highway 48	114	71	United States border	Trans-Canada Highway		1950	1979	
Highway 49	266	165	Highway 49 at the British Columbia border west of Bay Tree	Highway 43 in Valleyview	Northern Woods and Water Route	—	—	
Highway 50	14	8.7	Highway 12 at Tees	Highway 21 at Mirror		—	—	
Highway 52	24	15	Highway 5 at Welling Station	Highway 4 at Craddock		—	—	
Highway 53	222	138	Highway 22 west of Rimbey	Highway 36 / Highway 608 east of Forestburg		—	—	
Highway 54	69	43	Highway 22 / Highway 591 west of Caroline	Highway 2 at Innisfail		—	—	
Highway 55	263	163	Highway 2 in Athabasca	Highway 55 at the Saskatchewan border east of Cherry Grove	Northern Woods and Water Route	c. 1976	current	
Highway 56	250	160	Highway 1 (TCH) northwest of Bassano	Highway 26 east of Camrose		—	—	
Highway 58	325	202	Rainbow Lake	Garden River		—	—	
Highway 59	62	39	Highway 43 northwest of Hythe	Highway 2 north of Sexsmith		—	—	
Highway 60	35	22	Highway 39 east of Calmar	Highway 16 (TCH) at Acheson	Devonian Way	—	—	
Highway 61	147	91	Highway 4 / Highway 846 at Stirling	Highway 889 at Manyberries	Red Coat Trail	1959	current	
Highway 62	52	32	S-213 at the U.S. (Montana) border south of Del Bonita	Highway 5 at Magrath		—	—	
Highway 63	434	270	Highway 28 / Highway 829 east of Radway	Winter road north of Fort MacKay		1962	current	Passes through Fort McMurray.
Highway 64	126	78	Cecil Lake Road at the British Columbia border near Bear Canyon	Highway 2 southwest of Fairview		—	—	
Highway 64A	6.6	4.1	Highway 64 / Highway 682 west of Fairview	Highway 2 / Highway 732 in Fairview		—	—	
Highway 66	28	17	Don Getty Wildland Provincial Park	Highway 22 / Highway 762 south of Bragg Creek		—	—	
Highway 68	37	23	Highway 40 at Bow Valley Provincial Park	Highway 1 (TCH) east of Morley	Sibbald Creek Trail	—	—	
Highway 72	33	21	Highway 2 / Highway 2A south of Crossfield	Highway 9 / Highway 806 at Beiseker		c. 1980s	current	Former Highway 572.
Highway 88	428	266	Highway 2 at Slave Lake	Highway 58 north of Fort Vermilion	Bicentennial Highway	1988	current	Signed with Bicentennial Highway shield; former Highway 67
Highway 93	265	165	Highway 93 at the British Columbia border at Vermilion Pass	Highway 16 (TCH) at Jasper	Banff–Windermere Highway; Icefields Parkway	1959	current	
Highway 93A	24	15	Highway 93 at Athabasca Falls	Highway 93 east of Marmot Basin		—	—	
Highway 93A	1.7	1.1	Highway 93 south Jasper	Highway 16 (TCH) at Jasper		—	—	
SPF	7.1	4.4	Edmonton city limits	Highway 216 in Sherwood Park	Sherwood Park Freeway	1999	current	Unsigned Highway 100; former Highway 14.
Highway 201	101	63	Calgary ring road		Stoney Trail; Tsuut’ina Trail	c. 1990s	current	
Highway 216	77	48	Edmonton ring road		Anthony Henday Drive	1992	current	

=== X series ===
The roads in the X series are typically highways that are planned realignments or spurs of existing highways. The numbers applied to each highway in the X series are derived from the highway that is planned for realignment or spurred from (e.g. Highway 16X will be a realignment of Highway 16, and Highway 10X is spur from Highway 10).

Number	Length (km)	Length (mi)	Southern or western terminus	Northern or eastern terminus	Formed	Removed	Notes
Highway 1X	5	3.1	Highway 1A east of Exshaw	Highway 1 south of Seebe	c. 1961	current	
Highway 1X	—	—	Strathmore bypass		proposed	—	ROW located south of Strathmore.
Highway 1X	—	—	Medicine Hat bypass		proposed	—	ROW located south of Medicine Hat.
Highway 2X	—	—	Highway 2 / Highway 3 west of Fort Macleod	Highway 2 / Highway 3 east of Fort Macleod	proposed	—	Stage 1 of Fort Macleod bypass; ROW located south of Fort Macleod.
Highway 2X	—	—	Claresholm bypass		proposed	—	ROW located east of Claresholm.
Highway 2X	—	—	Nanton bypass		proposed	—	ROW located east of Nanton.
Highway 3X	—	—	Crowsnest Pass bypass		proposed	—	ROW located south of Crowsnest Pass.
Highway 3X	—	—	Pincher Creek realignment		proposed	—	ROW located south of Highway 3 to allow for a proposed interchange at Highway 6.
Highway 3X	—	—	Highway 3 west of Fort Macleod	Highway 2X west of Fort Macleod	proposed	—	Stage 2 of Fort Macleod bypass; ROW located south of Fort Macleod.
Highway 3X	—	—	Highway 3 west of Coalhurst	Highway 3 west of Chin	proposed	—	Lethbridge bypass; ROW located north of Lethbridge.
Highway 4X	—	—	Highway 4 southeast of Lethbridge	Highway 3X east of Lethbridge	proposed	—	Lethbridge bypass; ROW located east of Lethbridge.
Highway 6X	—	—	Pincher Creek bypass		proposed	—	ROW located east of Pincher Creek.
Highway 10X	6	3.7	Highway 9 / Highway 56 at Rosedale	Wayne	—	—	
Highway 11X	—	—	Highway 11 in Red Deer	Highway 11 east of Red Deer	proposed	—	Proposed Highway 11 realignment (67 Street extension).
Highway 16X	—	—	Hinton bypass		proposed	—	ROW located south of Hinton.
Highway 16X	—	—	Edson bypass		proposed	—	ROW located south of Edson.
Highway 16X	—	—	Highway 16 east of Blackfoot	Saskatchewan border / Highway 17 south of Lloydminster	proposed	—	Proposed Lloydminster bypass; ROW located south of Lloydminster.
Highway 22X	54	34	Highway 22 near Priddis	Highway 24 / Highway 901 south of Cheadle	c. 1976	current	Former Highway 22 west of Calgary.
Highway 40X	—	—	Highway 40 south of Grande Prairie	Highway 43 west of Grande Prairie	proposed	—	Proposed SW Grande Prairie bypass.
Highway 43X	—	—	Whitecourt bypass		proposed	—	ROW located south of Whitecourt.
Unbuilt or under construction

== 500–986 series ==
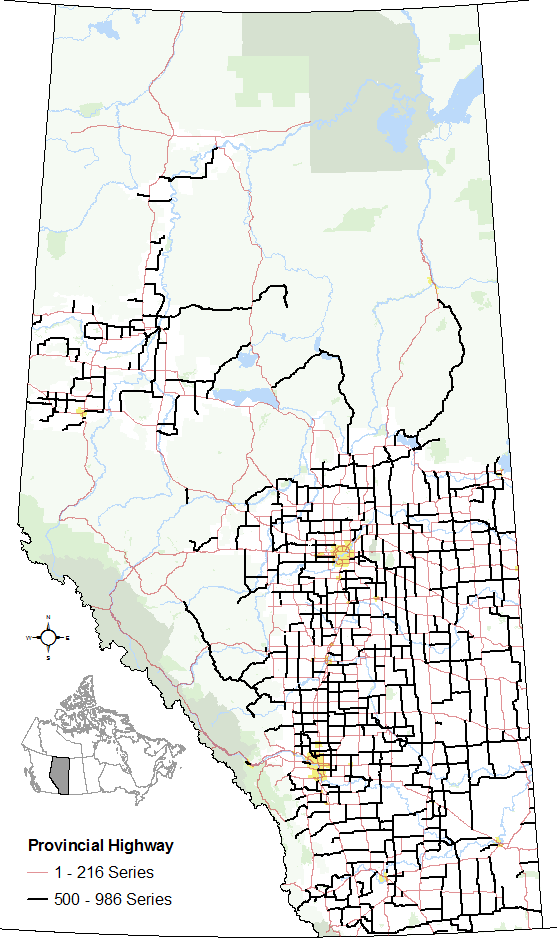
The 500 – 986 series of highways within Alberta's provincial highway system as of 2016

Alberta's 500–986 series of provincial highways are generally considered local or rural highways. The 500–986 series of provincial highways is divided into three sub-series:

- The 500/600 highways are east–west roads where the numbering increases northward from the Montana border to the Northwest Territories border.
- The 700/800 highways are north–south roads where numbering increases eastward from the British Columbia border to the Saskatchewan border.
- The 900 highways are newer or planned roads that have been established for future consideration as or as potential extensions or realignments of highways within the 1–216 series.

Some of these highways are paved, while others are entirely or partially gravel. Rural speed limits range from 80 to 100 km/h (50–62 mph).

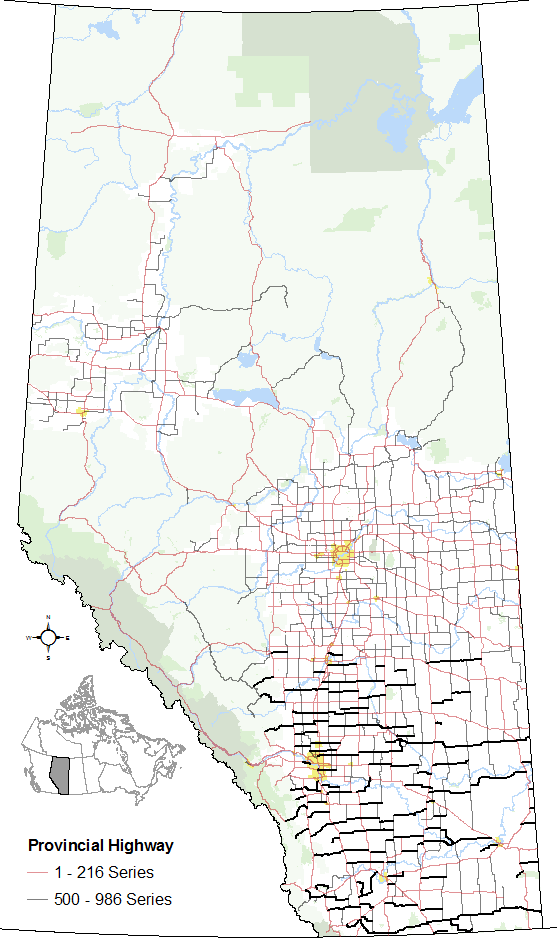
500 subseries

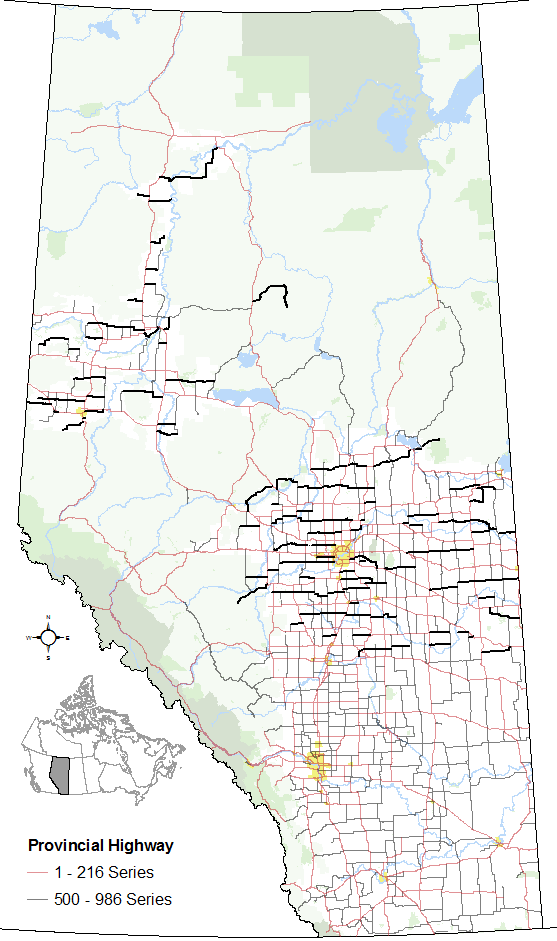
600 subseries

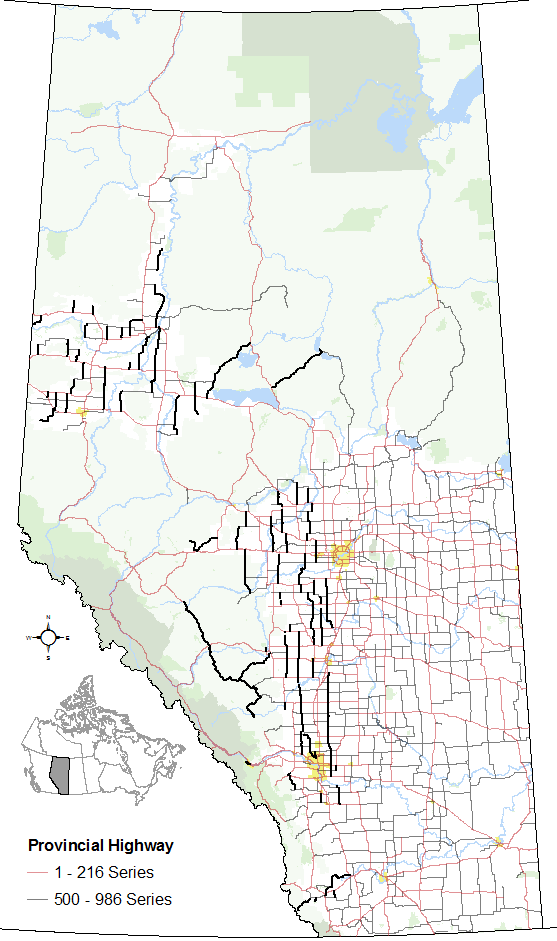
700 subseries

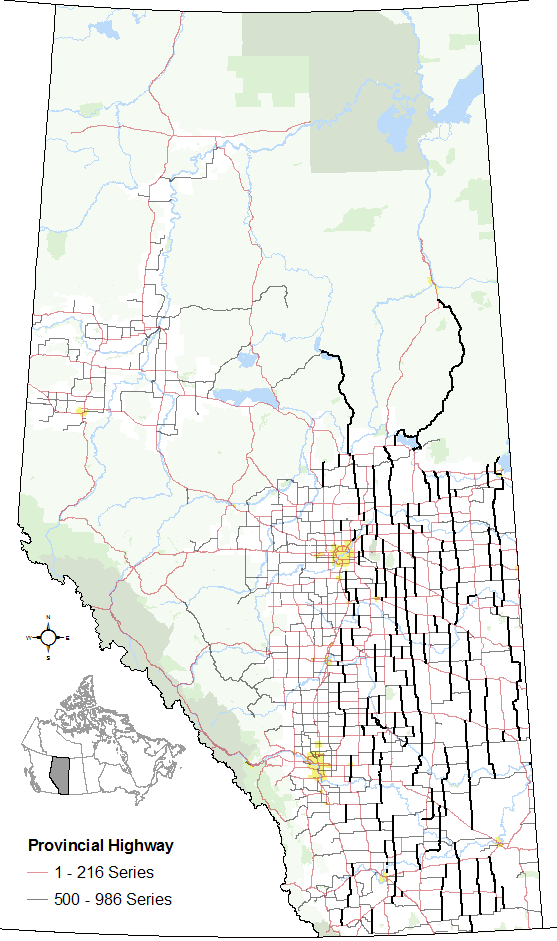
800 subseries

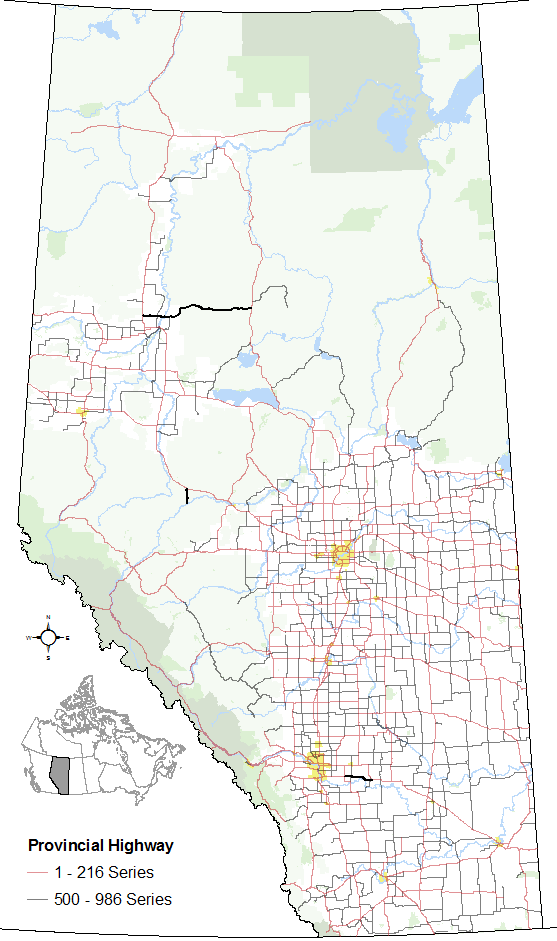
900 subseries

=== 500 ===
Number	Length (km)	Length (mi)	Southern or western terminus	Northern or eastern terminus	Local name(s)	Opened	Removed	Notes
Highway 500	19	12	Highway 4 in Coutts	Range Road 135		—	Current	
Highway 500	43	27	Highway 501 north of Writing-on-Stone Provincial Park	Highway 880 at Aden		—	Current	
Highway 501	300	186	Highway 5 east of Mountain View	SK 13 at the Sask. border east of Onefour	Red Coat Trail (Highway 889–Saskatchewan)	—	Current	Passes through Cardston and Milk River.
Highway 501	5	3	Highway 2 south of Cardston	Highway 2 / Highway 5 north of Cardston	Cardston Bypass	—	Current	Spur; unsigned highway
Highway 503	18	11	Highway 5 east of Cardston	Highway 820 near Woolford Provincial Park		—	Current	
Highway 504	29	18	Highway 4 & Highway 36 in Warner	Highway 877		—	Current	
Highway 505	72	45	Highway 6 south of Pincher Creek	Highway 5 in Spring Coulee		—	Current	
Highway 506	46	29	Highway 62 south of Magrath	Highway 4 north of Warner		—	Current	Passes through McNab.
Highway 507	73	45	Highway 3 west of Lundbreck	Highway 810 north of Glenwood		—	Current	Passes through Pincher Creek.
Highway 508	8	5	Highway 5 south of Lethbridge	Highway 4 southeast of Lethbridge		—	Current	
Highway 509	48	30	Highway 2 in Stand Off	Highway 3 west of Coalhurst		—	Current	
Highway 510	24	15	Highway 3 in Cowley	Highway 785 north of Pincher Creek		—	Current	
Highway 511	28	17	Highway 2 south of Fort Macleod	Highway 509 in Blood I.R. 148		—	Current	
Highway 512	28	17	Highway 3 / Highway 4 in Lethbridge	Highway 3 east of Coaldale		—	Current	
Highway 513	29	18	Highway 36 south of Taber	Highway 877		—	Current	
Highway 514	13	8	Range Road 41 west of Cypress Hills Interprovincial Park	Highway 41 north of Cypress Hills Interprovincial Park		—	Current	
Highway 515	25	16	Highway 41 north of Cypress Hills Interprovincial Park	SK 724 at the Sask. border east of Elkwater		—	Current	
Highway 519	65	40	Highway 2 in Granum	Highway 845 east of Picture Butte		—	Current	Passes through Nobleford and Picture Butte.
Highway 520	105	65	Highway 22 west of Claresholm	Highway 843 north of Coaldale		—	Current	Passes through Claresholm and Barons.
Highway 521	21	13	Highway 25 north of Turin	Highway 864 south of Vauxhall		—	Current	
Highway 522	12	7	Highway 843 north of Picture Butte	Highway 845 south of Lomond		—	Current	
Highway 523	26	16	Range Road 84	Highway 3 in Medicine Hat		—	Current	
Highway 524	106	66	Highway 864 west of Vauxhall	Highway 1 west of Redcliff		—	Current	Passes through Vauxhall and Hays.
Highway 525	28	17	Highway 875 in Rolling Hills	Highway 524 east of Hays		—	Current	
Highway 526	39	24	Highway 845 west of Enchant	Highway 36 north of Vauxhall		—	Current	
Highway 527	14	9	Willow Creek Provincial Park	Highway 2 in Stavely		—	Current	
Highway 528	19	12	Highway 41 south of Schuler	SK 728 at the Sask. border southeast of Schuler		—	Current	
Highway 529	78	48	Highway 2 south of Parkland	Highway 845 south of Lomond		—	Current	
Highway 530	20	12	Highway 36 south of Scandia	Highway 875 north of Rolling Hills		—	Current	
Highway 531	18	11	Highway 842	Highway 845 in Lomond		—	Current	
Highway 532	26	16	Forestry Trunk Road	Highway 22 north of Chain Lakes Provincial Park		—	Current	
Highway 533	63	39	Highway 22 at Chain Lakes Provincial Park	Highway 804 east of Nanton		—	Current	Passes through Nanton.
Highway 534	40	25	Highway 804 east of Nanton	Highway 842 east of Vulcan		—	Current	Passes through Vulcan.
Highway 535	17	11	Highway 873 east of Lake Newell	Highway 876 south of Tilley		—	Current	
Highway 537	7	4	Highway 41 south of Hilda	SK 371 at the Sask. border west of Richmound, SK		—	Current	
Highway 539	56	35	Highway 845 north of Lomond	Highway 36 south of Brooks		—	Current	
Highway 540	35	22	Highway 22 south of Longview	Highway 2 north of Cayley		—	Current	
Highway 541	43	27	Highway 40 south of Elbow-Sheep Wildland Provincial Park	Highway 22 in Longview		—	Current	
Highway 542	23	14	Highway 23 / Highway 24 north of Vulcan	Highway 842 west of Milo		—	Current	
Highway 542	11	7	Highway 36 east of Cassils	Highway 1 in Brooks	Cassils Road	—	Current	
Highway 543	25	16	Highway 22 south of Black Diamond	Highway 2A in High River		—	Current	
Highway 544	57	35	Highway 36 south of Duchess	Highway 884 south of Jenner		—	Current	
Highway 545	7	4	Highway 41 north of Hilda	SK 321 at the Sask. border west of Burstall, SK		—	Current	
Highway 546	30	19	Range Road 42	Highway 22 in Turner Valley		—	Current	
Highway 547	77	48	Highway 2 / Highway 2A / Highway 7 north of Aldersyde	Highway 1 in Gleichen		—	Current	
Highway 549	47	29	Range Road 44 west of Millarville	Highway 2A in Okotoks		—	Current	
Highway 550	40	25	Highway 1 east of Bassano	Highway 873 at Duchess		—	Current	Former Highway 1 section; passes through Rosemary.
Highway 552	13	8	Highway 2A at Calgary city limits	Highway 549 west of Okotoks		—	Current	
Highway 552	33	21	Highway 2 / Highway 2A south of Calgary	Highway 547 / Highway 799 east of Aldersyde		—	Current	
Highway 555	85	53	Highway 884 in Jenner	Highway 41 south of Empress		—	Current	
Highway 556	19	12	Highway 862 south of Gem	Highway 36 north of Duchess		—	Current	
Highway 560	16	10	Calgary city limits	Highway 797 in Langdon	Glenmore Trail	—	Current	
Highway 561	69	43	Highway 1 east of Strathmore	Highway 862 north of Gem		—	Current	Passes through Hussar.
Highway 561	51	32	Highway 36 north of Duchess	Highway 884 north of Jenner		—	Current	Passes through Cessford.
Highway 562	14	9	Highway 41 east of Empress	SK 741 at the Sask. border at Empress		—	Current	
Highway 563	6	4	Highway 1 west of Calgary	Calgary city limits	Old Banff Coach Road	—	Current	The maximum speed limit on this highway is 60 km/h (35 mph).
Highway 564	126	78	Calgary city limits	Highway 569 southeast of Drumheller		—	Current	Continues into Calgary as Country Hills Boulevard.
Highway 566	34	21	Highway 772 west of Balzac	Highway 9 between Kathyrn and Keoma		—	Current	
Highway 567	64	40	Highway 22 north of Cochrane	Highway 9 south of Irricana	Big Hill Springs Road; Irricana Road	—	Current	Passes through Airdrie along Veterans Boulevard.
Highway 569	28	17	Highway 841 east of Rosebud	Highway 10 & Highway 570 in Drumheller		—	Current	Passes through Rosebud and Dalum.
Highway 570	187	116	Highway 10 / Highway 569 in Drumheller	Sask. border south of Alsask, SK (connects to SK 44)		—	Current	
Highway 573	24	15	Highway 10 in Drumheller	Highway 851 at Little Fish Lake Provincial Park		—	Current	
Highway 574	33	21	Highway 22 east of Bottrel	Highway 2A in Crossfield		—	Current	Passes through Madden.
Highway 575	77	48	Highway 791 west of Acme	Highway 9 / Highway 56 in Drumheller	Dinosaur Trail (Highway 837–Highway 9)	—	Current	Passes through Acme and Carbon.
Highway 576	29	18	Highway 9 / Highway 56 in Drumheller	Highway 851		—	Current	
Highway 577	10	6	Highway 36 south of Hanna	Sheerness		—	Current	
Highway 579	49	30	Highway 40 / Highway 734 west of Water Valley	Highway 22 south of Cremona		—	Current	Passes through Water Valley.
Highway 580	29	18	Highway 22 in Cremona	Highway 2A south of Carstairs		—	Current	
Highway 581	19	12	Highway 2A in Carstairs	Highway 791 east of Carstairs		—	Current	
Highway 582	90	56	Highway 22 west of Didsbury	Highway 21 / Highway 27 south of Three Hills		—	Current	Passes through Didsbury.
Highway 583	36	22	Highway 805 south of Torrington	Highway 836 east of Three Hills		—	Current	Passes through Three Hills.
Highway 584	44	27	Highway 734 west of Bearberry	Highway 22 / Highway 27 in Sundre		—	Current	
Highway 585	39	24	Highway 21 in Trochu	Highway 56 east of Rumsey		—	Current	
Highway 586	67	42	Highway 36 north of Hanna	Highway 884 south of Veteran		—	Current	
Highway 587	98	61	Highway 22 at James River Bridge	Highway 21 at Huxley		—	Current	Passes through Bowden
Highway 589	39	24	Highway 56 south of Big Valley	Highway 855 at Endiang		—	Current	
Highway 590	83	52	Highway 2 in Innisfail	Highway 56 at Big Valley		—	Current	
Highway 591	31	19	Highway 734 west of Ricinus	Highway 22 / Highway 54 west of Caroline		—	Current	
Highway 592	15	9	Highway 781 east of Markerville	Highway 2A / Highway 42 in Penhold		—	Current	
Highway 593	16	10	Highway 850 south of Botha	Highway 853 north of Byemoor		—	Current	
Highway 594	11	7	Highway 835 south of Erskine	Highway 56 south of Stettler		—	Current	
Highway 595	38	24	Highway 2A (Gaetz Avenue) in Red Deer	Highway 21 north of Delburne	Delburne Road	—	Current	19 Street in Red Deer.
Highway 597	21	13	Highway 2 at Blackfalds	Highway 815 at Joffre		—	Current	
Highway 598	23	14	Highway 11 / Highway 22 / Highway 11A in Rocky Mountain House	Highway 761 in Leslieville		—	Current	52 Avenue in Rocky Mountain House.
Highway 599	75	47	Highway 861 in Castor	Highway 41 south of Czar		—	Current	

=== 600 ===
Number	Length (km)	Length (mi)	Southern or western terminus	Northern or eastern terminus	Local name(s)	Opened	Removed	Notes
Highway 600	43	27	Highway 41 south of Czar	Highway 13 / Highway 899 in Provost		—	Current	
Highway 601	77	48	Highway 11 south of Alix	Highway 855 north of Halkirk		—	Current	Passes through Alix.
Highway 602	28	17	Highway 36 in Alliance	Highway 872 north of Brownfield		—	Current	
Highway 603	6	4	Highway 884 south of Amisk	Highway 13 in Hughenden		—	Current	
Highway 604	19	12	Highway 792 east of Gull Lake	Highway 2A in Morningside		—	Current	
Highway 605	23	14	Highway 821 north of Tees	Highway 21 / Highway 53 in Bashaw		—	Current	
Highway 607	18	11	Highway 761	Highway 20 south of Bluffton		—	Current	
Highway 608	28	17	Highway 36 / Highway 53 east of Forestburg	Highway 872 south of Hardisty		—	Current	
Highway 608	15	9	Range Road 95 east of Battle River	Highway 884 in Amisk		—	Current	
Highway 609	42	26	Highway 21 north of Ferintosh	Highway 854 in Rosalind		—	Current	Passes through Edberg.
Highway 610	49	30	Highway 14 east of Wainwright	Highway 17 east of Ribstone		—	Current	Passes through Edgerton and Chauvin.
Highway 611	99	62	Highway 20 at Hoadley	Highway 21 between Ferintosh and New Norway		—	Current	Passes through Maskwacis.
Highway 613	8	5	Highway 2A / Highway 13 in Wetaskiwin	Highway 822 south of Gwynne		—	Current	40 Avenue through Wetaskiwin.
Highway 614	34	21	Highway 41 north of Wainwright	Highway 894		—	Current	
Highway 616	147	91	Range Road 71 in Buck Creek	Highway 21 north of Armena		—	Current	Passes through Breton, Pipestone, and Millet.
Highway 617	28	17	Highway 21 in Hay Lakes	Highway 834 north of Round Hill		—	Current	Passes through Kingman.
Highway 619	126	78	Highway 36 in Viking	Highway 17 south of Lloydminster		—	Current	
Highway 620	53	33	Brazeau Reservoir	Highway 22 in Drayton Valley		—	Current	Passes through Lodgepole.
Highway 621	30	19	Highway 753 in Cynthia	Highway 22 in Rocky Rapids		—	Current	
Highway 622	21	13	Highway 770 at St. Francis	Highway 39 north of Thorsby		—	Current	Passes through Telfordville.
Highway 623	48	30	50 Street in Leduc	Highway 617 south of Miquelon Lake Provincial Park	Rollyview Road	—	Current	Passes through Rolly View.
Highway 624	14	9	Highway 22 north of Rocky Rapids	Highway 759 south of Tomahawk		—	Current	
Highway 625	20	12	Highway 2 / Highway 19 in Nisku	Highway 21 south of Looma		—	Current	Passes through Beaumont.
Highway 626	43	27	Highway 834 in Tofield	Highway 857 south of Vegreville		—	Current	
Highway 627	70	43	Highway 759 north of Tomahawk	Edmonton city limits	Garden Valley Road	—	Current	
Highway 628	19	12	Highway 779 in Stony Plain	Edmonton city limits		—	Current	Connected by Whitemud Drive through Edmonton.
Highway 628	6	4	Highway 216 near Edmonton	Highway 21 south of Sherwood Park		—	Current	Connected by Whitemud Drive through Edmonton.
Highway 629	10	6	Highway 824 north of South Cooking Lake	Range Road 212 in Collingwood Cove		—	Current	
Highway 630	40	25	Highway 21 in Sherwood Park	Highway 14 / Highway 833 west of Tofield	Wye Road	—	Current	
Highway 631	90	56	Highway 16 west of Vegreville	Highway 41 north of Vermilion		—	Current	
Highway 633	89	55	Highway 757 northwest of Gainford	Highway 2 (St. Albert Trail) in St. Albert		—	Current	
Highway 640	24	15	Highway 41 south of Elk Point	Highway 893 south of Heinsburg		—	Current	
Highway 641	23	14	Highway 897 west of Tulliby Lake	Highway 17 / SK 797 in Onion Lake		—	Current	
Highway 642	42	26	Highway 777 west of Sunrise Beach	Highway 28 east of Morinville		—	Current	Passes through Sandy Beach and Morinville.
Highway 643	21	13	Highway 28A in Gibbons	Highway 38 south of Redwater		—	Current	
Highway 644	5	3	Highway 38 in Redwater	Highway 829 east of Redwater		—	Current	
Highway 645	18	11	Highway 45 east of Andrew	Highway 860 at Sandy Lake (County of Two Hills)		—	Current	
Highway 646	88	55	Highway 29 / Highway 36 west of Lafond	Highway 897 south of Frog Lake		—	Current	Passes through Elk Point.
Highway 647	18	11	Highway 751	Highway 22 south of Mayerthorpe		—	Current	
Highway 651	82	51	Highway 33 north of Birch Cove	Highway 28 west of Redwater		—	Current	Passes through Busby and Legal.
Highway 652	40	25	Highway 857 west of Hamlin	Highway 29 / Highway 36 at St. Brides		—	Current	Passes through Saddle Lake.
Highway 654	64	40	Highway 757 north of Sangudo	Highway 33 north of Birch Cove		—	Current	
Highway 655	10	6	Range Road 70	Highway 763 south of Tiger Lily		—	Current	
Highway 656	15	9	Highway 18 / Highway 63 east of Thorhild	Highway 831 north of Waskatenau		—	Current	
Highway 657	39	24	Highway 41 in Kehiwin I.R. 123	Highway 659 east of Bonnyville		—	Current	
Highway 658	59	37	Highway 43 south of Blue Ridge	Highway 33 west of Fort Assiniboine		—	Current	
Highway 659	59	37	Highway 28 in Bonnyville	Highway 897 south of Cold Lake I.R. 149		—	Current	
Highway 660	40	25	Highway 881 north of Therien	Highway 28 east of Bonnyville		—	Current	Passes through Glendon.
Highway 661	160	99	Highway 33 in Fort Assiniboine	Highway 831 east of Newbrook		—	Current	Passes through Dapp.
Highway 663	153	95	Highway 44 in Fawcett	Highway 55 west of Lac La Biche		—	Current	Passes through Boyle; 8 km (5 mi) gap near Lac La Biche.
Highway 663	40	25	Highway 881 east of Lac La Biche	Touchwood Lake east of Lakeland Provincial Park		—	Current	Passes through Boyle; 8 km (5 mi) gap near Lac La Biche.
Highway 665	30	19	Highway 43 south of Valleyview	Highway 747 south of Sunset House		—	Current	
Highway 666	37	23	Range Road 85 west of Grovedale	Highway 40 south of Grande Prairie		—	Current	
Highway 667	7	4	Highway 722 south of Beaverlodge	Highway 43 west of Huallen		—	Current	
Highway 668	7	4	Highway 40 (108 Street) south of Grande Prairie	Resources Road (Range Road 60) south of Grande Prairie	37 Avenue	—	Current	
Highway 669	23	14	Highway 49 in Valleyview	Highway 747 south of Sunset House		—	Current	
Highway 670	30	19	Highway 43 (100 Street) in Grande Prairie	Highway 43 / Highway 733 west of Bezanson		—	Current	
Highway 671	30	19	B.C. border west of Goodfare	Highway 43 north of Beaverlodge		—	Current	Passes through Goodfare.
Highway 672	62	39	Range Road 123 west of Hythe	Highway 2 south of Sexsmith	Emerson Trail	—	Current	
Highway 674	24	15	Highway 2 / Highway 59 north of Sexsmith	Highway 773 at Teepee Creek		—	Current	
Highway 676	60	37	Highway 736 north of DeBolt	Highway 49 north of Valleyview		—	Current	
Highway 677	44	27	Highway 724 west of Woking	Highway 733 south of Peoria		—	Current	
Highway 679	49	30	Highway 49 south of Donnelly	Highway 750 north of Grouard		—	Current	
Highway 680	15	9	Highway 725 south of Blueberry Mountain	Highway 727 northeast of Spirit River		—	Current	
Highway 681	48	30	Highway 719 north of Bonanza	Highway 725 north of Blueberry Mountain		—	Current	Passes through Silver Valley.
Highway 682	23	14	Highway 729	Highway 64 / Highway 64A west of Fairview		—	Current	
Highway 683	10	6	Highway 744 south of Marie Reine	Highway 2 in Nampa		—	Current	
Highway 684	31	19	Highway 2 south of Grimshaw	Highway 2 in Peace River		—	Current	
Highway 685	87	54	Highway 729 west of Hines Creek	Highway 2 in Grimshaw		—	Current	
Highway 686	89	55	Highway 88 north of Red Earth Creek	Trout Lake		—	Current	Passes through Peerless Lake.
Highway 686	2	1	North Parsons Gateway in Fort McMurray	Highway 63 in Fort McMurray	Parsons Access Road	—	Current	
Highway 686	200	120	Highway 686 north of Peerless Lake	Highway 686 / North Parsons Gateway in Fort McMurray	East-West Connector	proposed	—	Proposed connection between the two Highway 686 segments.
Highway 688	24	15	Highway 2 south of Peace River	Highway 986 north of Peace River		—	Current	
Highway 689	24	15	Range Road 10	Highway 35 in Dixonville		—	Current	
Highway 690	11	7	Highway 35 south of North Star	Highway 743 in Deadwood		—	Current	
Highway 691	15	9	Highway 35 (Main Street) in Manning	Highway 741		—	Current	
Highway 692	27	17	Highway 35 north of Manning	Range Road 210		—	Current	
Highway 695	56	35	Range Road 243 west of Keg River	Range Road 200 at Carcajou		—	Current	
Highway 697	119	74	Highway 35 north of Paddle Prairie	Highway 88 west of Fort Vermilion		—	Current	Passes through La Crete; ferry across Peace River.
Proposed or unbuilt

=== 700 ===
Number	Length (km)	Length (mi)	Southern or western terminus	Northern or eastern terminus	Local name(s)	Opened	Removed	Notes
Highway 717	24	15	B.C. border at Cherry Point	Highway 64 west of Cleardale		—	Current	
Highway 719	14	9	Highway 49 east of Bay Tree	Highway 681 north of Bonanza		—	Current	
Highway 721	8	5	Highway 43 in Hythe	Highway 59 west of Valhalla Centre		—	Current	
Highway 722	36	22	Range Road 121 west of Elmworth	Highway 43 in Beaverlodge		—	Current	
Highway 723	24	15	Highway 43 east of Beaverlodge	Highway 59 in Valhalla Centre		—	Current	
Highway 724	47	29	Highway 43 at Wembley	Highway 677 north of La Glace		—	Current	
Highway 725	28	17	Highway 49 south of Blueberry Mountain	Highway 681 north of Blueberry Mountain		—	Current	
Highway 726	16	10	Highway 64	Township Road 870 in Worsley		—	Current	
Highway 727	20	12	Highway 49 west of Spirit River	Highway 680 east of Blueberry Mountain		—	Current	
Highway 729	17	11	Highway 682 west of Fairview	Highway 685 west of Hines Creek		—	Current	
Highway 730	8	5	Highway 64 northwest of Hines Creek	Township Road 862 at Eureka River		—	Current	
Highway 731	34	21	Highway 677 west of Woking	Highway 49 in Spirit River		—	Current	
Highway 732	17	11	Highway 2 / Highway 64A in Fairview	Highway 685 east of Hines Creek		—	Current	
Highway 733	58	36	Highway 43 / Highway 670 in Bezanson	Wanham north of Highway 49		—	Current	
Highway 734	268	167	Bighorn M.D. / Clearwater County boundary	Highway 40 at the Lovett River	Forestry Trunk Road	c. 1995	Current	Former Highway 940.
Highway 735	30	19	Highway 2 at Whitelaw	Highway 685		—	Current	
Highway 736	30	19	Highway 43 at DeBolt	Highway 676		—	Current	
Highway 737	35	22	Highway 2 at Brownvale	Highway 35 north of Grimshaw		—	Current	
Highway 739	10	6	Highway 49 south of Eaglesham	Township Road 790 north of Eaglesham		—	Current	
Highway 740	55	34	Highway 49 south of Tangent	Highway 684 south of Grimshaw		—	Current	Ferry across Peace River.
Highway 741	36	22	Highway 691 east of Manning	Township Road 944 west of Notikewin Provincial Park		—	Current	
Highway 742	8	5	Spray Lakes Road / Ken Ritchie Way near Canmore	Highway 1 in Canmore	Smith Dorrien Trail; Spray Lakes Road; Three Sisters Parkway	—	Current	Passes through Canmore, Kananaskis Country
Highway 743	73	45	Highway 2, in Peace River	Highway 690 in Deadwood	Weberville Road	—	Current	Passes through Weberville
Highway 744	95	59	Highway 676 south of Girouxville	Highway 2 in Peace River	Judah Hill Road	—	Current	Passes through Marie-Reine.
Highway 747	58	36	Highway 665 east of Valleyview	Highway 2A west of High Prairie		—	Current	
Highway 748	58	36	Amoco Road northwest of Edson	Highway 32 north of Peers		—	Current	Passes through Edson.
Highway 748	1.5	0.9	Highway 16 in Edson	Highway 748 (22 Avenue) in Edson		—	Current	
Highway 749	45	28	Township Road 720A south of High Prairie	Highway 679 east of Winagami Lake Provincial Park		—	Current	Passes through High Prairie.
Highway 750	104	65	Highway 2 east of Enilda	Highway 88 south of Red Earth Creek		—	Current	Passes through Atikameg.
Highway 751	63	39	Highway 16 at Nojock	Highway 43 east of Whitecourt		—	Current	Passes through MacKay.
Highway 752	63	39	Highway 734 west of Rocky Mountain House	Highway 11A in Rocky Mountain House		—	Current	
Highway 753	61	38	Highway 16 west of Wildwood	Highway 620 in Lodgepole		—	Current	Passes through Cynthia.
Highway 754	98	61	Highway 88 north of Lesser Slave Lake Provincial Park	Highway 813 at Wabasca-Desmarais		—	Current	
Highway 756	3	2	Highway 11 west of Rocky Mountain House	Crimson Lake Provincial Park		—	Current	
Highway 757	52	32	Highway 16 west of Gainford	Highway 18 north of Sangudo		—	Current	
Highway 758	5	3	Highway 66 south of Bragg Creek Provincial Park	Highway 22 in Bragg Creek		—	Current	
Highway 759	40	25	Highway 39 west of Carnwood	Highway 31 in Seba Beach		—	Current	Passes through Tomahawk.
Highway 760	10	6	Township Road 320 in Bergen	Highway 22 in Sundre		—	Current	
Highway 761	80	50	Highway 54 east of Caroline	Highway 607 west of Bluffton		—	Current	Passes through Leslieville; 3.2 km (2.0 mi) section still to be constructed over Weich Creek.
Highway 761	17	11	Highway 13 east of Buck Lake	Highway 616 west of Breton		—	Current	
Highway 762	22	14	Highway 549 west of Millarville	Highway 22 / Highway 66 south of Bragg Creek		—	Current	
Highway 763	26	16	Highway 18 at Campsie	Highway 33 south of Fort Assiniboine		—	Current	
Highway 764	30	19	Highway 43 at Cherhill	Highway 18 south of Campsie		—	Current	
Highway 765	24	15	Highway 16 south of Darwell	Highway 43 west of Glenevis		—	Current	
Highway 766	171	106	Highway 1A west of Calgary	Highway 53 west of Rimbey	Lochend Road (Rocky View County)	—	Current	Passes through Eckville; 4.1 km (2.5 mi) section still to be constructed over the Red Deer River.
Highway 769	23	14	Highway 18 north of Barrhead	Highway 661 south of Neerlandia		—	Current	
Highway 770	60	37	Highway 616 east of Breton	Highway 16 / Highway 43 north of Carvel		—	Current	Passes through Warburg.
Highway 771	80	50	Highway 20 north of Bentley	Highway 616 north of Sundance Beach		—	Current	
Highway 772	31	19	Calgary city limits	Highway 574 at Madden	Symons Valley Road	—	Current	
Highway 774	27	17	Castle Mountain Resort	Highway 507 at Beaver Mines		—	Current	
Highway 775	8	5	Beauvais Lake Provincial Park	Highway 507 west of Pincher Creek		—	Current	
Highway 776	19	12	Highway 18 between Barrhead & Westlock	Highway 661 between Neerlandia & Dapp		—	Current	
Highway 777	59	37	Highway 37 in Onoway	Highway 18 west of Westlock		—	Current	
Highway 778	15	9	Highway 616 north of Pigeon Lake	Highway 39 in Thorsby		—	Current	
Highway 779	30	19	Highway 627 south of Stony Plain	Highway 37 west of Calahoo	Meridian Road	—	Current	Follows Fifth Meridian; 48 Street through Stony Plain.
Highway 780	8	5	Highway 13A east of Ma-Me-O Beach	Highway 616 east of Silver Beach		—	Current	
Highway 781	23	14	Highway 54 northwest of Innisfail	Highway 11 at Sylvan Lake		—	Current	
Highway 783	11	7	Highway 543 west of High River	Highway 2A / Highway 7 in Okotoks		—	Current	
Highway 785	63	39	Highway 6 in Pincher Creek	Highway 2 north of Fort Macleod		—	Current	
Highway 786	10	6	Highway 507 east of Pincher Creek	Highway 3 at Brocket		—	Current	
Highway 791	130	81	Highway 22X south of Indus	Highway 590 east of Innisfail		—	Current	Passes through Delacour.
Highway 792	50	31	Highway 12 east of Gull Lake	Township 454 south of Westerose		—	Current	
Highway 795	72	45	Highway 53 west of Ponoka	Highway 39 in Calmar		—	Current	
Highway 797	2.9	1.8	Highway 552 east of De Winton	South bank of the Bow River		—	Current	
Highway 797	6.5	4.0	Highway 560 (Glenmore Trail) in Langdon	Highway 1 / Highway 9 east of Chestermere		—	Current	
Highway 799	16	10	Highway 23 south of Blackie	Highway 547 / Highway 552 east of Aldersyde		—	Current	

=== 800 ===
Number	Length (km)	Length (mi)	Southern or western terminus	Northern or eastern terminus	Local name(s)	Opened	Removed	Notes
Highway 800	21	13	Highway 5 west of Mountain View	Highway 505 north Hill Spring		—	Current	Passes through Hill Spring.
Highway 801	32	20	Highway 44 / Highway 661 northeast of Dapp	Cross Lake Provincial Park		—	Current	
Highway 803	14	9	Highway 28 west of Bon Accord	Highway 651 east of Legal		—	Current	
Highway 804	24	15	Highway 533 between Nanton and Vulcan	Highway 23 north of Brant		—	Current	
Highway 805	36	22	Highway 583 south of Torrington	Highway 590 east of Innisfail		—	Current	Passes through Wimborne.
Highway 806	37	23	Highway 9 / Highway 72 in Beiseker	Highway 583 west of Three Hills		—	Current	Passes through Acme and Linden.
Highway 808	6	4	Highway 595 east of Red Deer	Highway 11 east of Red Deer		—	Current	
Highway 810	42	26	Highway 505 in Glenwood	Highway 3 west of Fort Macleod		—	Current	
Highway 811	18	11	Highway 2 / Highway 3 in Fort Macleod	Highway 519 east of Granum		—	Current	
Highway 812	18	11	Highway 663 west of Colinton	Highway 2 east of Sunset Beach		—	Current	
Highway 813	172	107	Highway 55 in Athabasca	Highway 754 at Wabasca-Desmarais		—	Current	Passes through Calling Lake and Sandy Lake.
Highway 814	42	26	Highway 13 in Wetaskiwin	Highway 625 in Beaumont		—	Current	Continues through Beaumont into Edmonton as 50 Street.
Highway 815	43	27	Highway 11 north of Joffre	Highway 53 in Ponoka		—	Current	
Highway 816	24	15	Highway 590 south of Pine Lake	Highway 595 east of Red Deer		—	Current	
Highway 817	36	22	Highway 24 east of Carseland	Highway 564 in Ardenode		—	Current	Passes through Strathmore as Wheatland Trail.
Highway 820	32	20	Highway 501 east of Cardston	Highway 5 west of Spring Coulee		—	Current	
Highway 821	23	14	Highway 12 at Tees	Highway 53 east of Ponoka		—	Current	
Highway 822	42	26	Highway 53 west of Bashaw	Highway 616 east of Millet		—	Current	Passes through Gwynne.
Highway 824	17	11	Highway 14 west of South Cooking Lake	Highway 630 south of Ardrossan		—	Current	
Highway 825	14	9	Highway 37 west of Fort Saskatchewan	Highway 643 east of Gibbons		—	Current	
Highway 827	83	52	Highway 28 south of Egremont	Highway 55 east of Athabasca		—	Current	Passes through Thorhild.
Highway 829	10	6	Highway 644 east of Redwater	Highway 28 / Highway 63 west of Radway		—	Current	
Highway 830	47	29	Highway 630 east of Sherwood Park	Highway 38 north of Bruderheim		—	Current	Passes through Josephburg.
Highway 831	100	62	Elk Island National Park boundary	Highway 63 / Highway 663 in Boyle		—	Current	Passes through Lamont, Star, and Waskatenau.
Highway 833	44	27	Highway 13 in Camrose	Highway 14 / Highway 630 south of Lindbrook		—	Current	53 Street in Camrose.
Highway 834	77	48	Highway 26 east of Camrose	Highway 15 at Chipman		—	Current	Passes through Round Hill and Tofield.
Highway 834A	4.0	2.5	Highway 834 north of Tofield	Highway 14 in Tofield		2021	Current	Unsigned; former Highway 834 alignment through Tofield.
Highway 835	48	30	Highway 590 west of Big Valley	Rochon Sands		—	Current	Passes through Erskine.
Highway 836	59	37	Highway 9 west of Drumheller	Highway 585 east of Trochu		—	Current	Passes through Carbon.
Highway 837	23	14	Highway 575 west of Drumheller	Highway 27 west of Morrin	Dinosaur Trail (Highway 575–Highway 838)	—	Current	
Highway 838	26	16	Highway 9 & Highway 56 in Drumheller	Highway 837 west of Munson	Dinosaur Trail	—	Current	Ferry across the Red Deer River.
Highway 839	23	14	Highway 27 west of Morrin	Highway 585 in Rumsey		—	Current	
Highway 840	41	25	Highway 561 south of Standard	Highway 9 north of Rosebud		—	Current	
Highway 841	9	6	Highway 569 east of Rosebud	Highway 9 west of Drumheller		—	Current	
Highway 842	118	73	Highway 529 west of Milo	Highway 564 north of Chancellor		—	Current	Passes through Siksika Nation and Cluny.
Highway 843	45	28	Lethbridge city limits	Highway 552		—	Current	Passes through Picture Butte; 7.3 km (4.5 mi) section still to be constructed over the Oldman River.
Highway 844	9	6	Highway 506 west of Milk River Ridge Reservoir	Highway 52 west of Raymond		—	Current	
Highway 845	102	63	Highway 52 in Raymond	Highway 539 north of Lomond		—	Current	Passes through Coaldale as 20 Street.
Highway 846	7	4	Highway 52 east of Raymond	Highway 4 / Highway 61 in Stirling		—	Current	Passes through Stirling as 1 Street.
Highway 848	20	12	Highway 564 southwest of Dorothy	Highway 573 west of Little Fish Lake Provincial Park		—	Current	
Highway 849	31	19	Highway 10 in Drumheller	Highway 9 north of Michichi		—	Current	
Highway 850	51	32	Highway 593 south of Botha	Highway 53 in Donalda		—	Current	Passes through Red Willow.
Highway 851	82	51	Highway 573 south of Delia	Highway 589 west of Byemoor		—	Current	Passes through Delia.
Highway 852	16	10	Highway 12 at Gadsby	Highway 601 east of Red Willow		—	Current	
Highway 853	19	12	Highway 589 at Byemoor	Highway 593		—	Current	
Highway 854	91	57	Highway 53 east of Donalda	Highway 626 north of Ryley		—	Current	Passes through Rosalind and Bawlf.
Highway 855	389	242	Highway 9 west of Hanna	Highway 55 / Highway 63 at Atmore		—	Current	Passes through Heisler, Daysland, Holden, Mundare, Andrew, and Smoky Lake.
Highway 856	26	16	Highway 53 in Forestburg	Highway 13 in Strome		—	Current	
Highway 857	128	80	Highway 26 south of Bruce	Highway 28 south of Bellis		—	Current	Passes through Bruce, Vegreville, and Willingdon.
Highway 858	55	34	Highway 55 south of Plamondon	Highway 881 north of Lac La Biche		—	Current	
Highway 859	16	10	Highway 652 west of Saddle Lake	Highway 28 / Highway 36 at Vilna		—	Current	
Highway 860	9	6	Highway 29 east of Hairy Hill	Highway 645		—	Current	
Highway 861	42	26	Highway 12 in Castor	Highway 53 north of Galahad		—	Current	
Highway 862	115	71	Highway 550 west of Rosemary	Highway 9 west of Hanna		—	Current	Passes through Gem, ferry across the Red Deer River.
Highway 864	34	21	Highway 3 in Taber	Highway 524 west of Vauxhall		—	Current	46 Avenue in Taber.
Highway 866	46	29	Highway 28 / Highway 36 east of Spedden	Highway 55 west of Rich Lake		—	Current	
Highway 867	39	24	Highway 608 east of Forestburg	Highway 13 at Sedgewick		—	Current	
Highway 869	23	14	Highway 608 east of Forestburg	Highway 13 at Sedgewick		—	Current	
Highway 870	111	69	Highway 13 at Lougheed	Highway 45 east of Musidora		—	Current	Passes through Kinsella and Innisfree.
Highway 872	97	60	Highway 586 west of Hemaruka	Highway 13 west of Hardisty		—	Current	Passes through Coronation and Brownfield.
Highway 873	57	35	Range Road 162 at Rainier	Highway 550 at Duchess		—	Current	Passes through Brooks along 7 Street E and 2 Street W.
Highway 875	82	51	Highway 36 south of Vauxhall	Highway 1 west of Tilley		—	Current	Passes through Hays and Rolling Hills.
Highway 876	100	62	Highway 535 south of Tilley	Highway 570 south of Sunnynook		—	Current	Passes through Patricia, Wardlow, and Cessford.
Highway 877	81	50	Highway 501 east of Milk River	Highway 3 at Grassy Lake		—	Current	Passes through Skiff.
Highway 879	98	61	Highway 501 south of Foremost	Highway 524 northwest of Bow Island		—	Current	
Highway 880	25	16	MT Sec 409 at the U.S. border	Highway 501 north of Aden		—	Current	
Highway 881	216	134	Highway 13 at Hardisty	Highway 55 east of Fork Lake		—	Current	Passes through Irma, Mannville, Myrnam, St. Paul, and St. Vincent.
Highway 881	266	165	Highway 55 / Highway 36 in Lac La Biche	Highway 63 south of Fort McMurray		—	Current	Passes through Conklin and Anzac.
Highway 882	10	6	Highway 28 south of Glendon	Highway 660 north of Glendon		—	Current	
Highway 883	21	13	Highway 14 west of Fabyan	Highway 41 north of Wainwright		—	Current	
Highway 884	280	174	Highway 1 at Suffield	Highway 13 at Amisk		—	Current	Passes through Ralston, Jenner, Youngstown, and Veteran.
Highway 885	76	47	Highway 501 south of Etzikom	Highway 3 east of Bow Island		—	Current	
Highway 886	142	88	Highway 555 west of Buffalo	Highway 12 / Highway 41 in Consort		—	Current	Passes through Cereal.
Highway 887	77	48	Highway 501 south of Orion	Highway 3 at Seven Persons		—	Current	
Highway 889	29	18	Highway 501 south of Manyberries	Township Road 70 north of Manyberries	Red Coat Trail (Highway 501–Highway 61)	—	Current	
Highway 892	31	19	Highway 659 south of Ardmore	Township Road 643 west of Cold Lake		—	Current	
Highway 893	72	45	Highway 619 south of Islay	Highway 646 in Heinsburg		—	Current	Passes through Dewberry.
Highway 894	32	20	Highway 610 at Edgerton	Township Road 470 northeast of Wainwright		—	Current	
Highway 895	14	9	Highway 570 south of Oyen	Highway 41 at Oyen		—	Current	
Highway 897	186	116	Highway 14 north of Edgerton	Highway 55 east of Beaver Crossing		—	Current	Passes through Paradise Valley, Kitscoty, Marwayne, and Frog Lake.
Highway 897	23	14	Cold Lake city limits (CFB Cold Lake boundary)	Cold Lake Provincial Park		—	Current	
Highway 899	2	1	Empress	Highway 562 north of Empress		—	Current	
Highway 899	189	117	Highway 570 north of Acadia Valley	Highway 610 west of Chauvin		—	Current	Passes through Altario, Bodo, and Provost.

=== 900 ===
The 900 series includes highways that are planned realignments or extensions of existing highways. The numbers applied to each highway in the 900 series are derived from the highway that is planned to be realigned or extended (e.g. Highway 901 is a potential realignment of Highway 1 and Highway 986 is an extension of Highway 686).

Number	Length (km)	Length (mi)	Southern or western terminus	Northern or eastern terminus	Formed	Removed	Notes
Highway 901	40	25	Highway 24 / Highway 22X north of Carseland	Highway 1 at Gleichen	—	—	
Highway 921	27	17	Highway 21 / Highway 595 north of Delburne	Highway 12 / Highway 21 east of Alix	proposed	—	Proposed Highway 21 realignment across Red Deer River; includes 11 km (7 mi) concurrency with Highway 11.
Highway 947	24	15	Athabasca River	Highway 43 southeast of Fox Creek	c. 1975	current	
Highway 947	69	43	Highway 16 / Highway 47 east of Edson	Athabasca River	proposed	—	Proposed extension.
Highway 956	65	40	Highway 881 south of Anzac	Saskatchewan Highway 956 southwest of La Loche, Saskatchewan	proposed	—	Proposed all-weather route to connect Fort McMurray and La Loche, Saskatchewan.
Highway 986	158	98	Highway 35 north of Grimshaw	Highway 88 south of Red Earth Creek	c. 1995	current	Formerly Highway 686.
Unbuilt or under construction

== See also ==
- Alberta economic corridors
- List of former Alberta provincial highways
- Transportation in Calgary
- Transportation in Edmonton
- Transportation in Lethbridge
