= Sexsmith =

Sexsmith may refer to:

- Sexsmith (surname)
- Sexsmith, Alberta, a town in Alberta, Canada
  - Sexsmith Vipers, a hockey team based in the town
- Sexsmith/Exeter Airport, an airport
- J. W. Sexsmith Elementary School, a public school in Vancouver, Canada
- Sexsmith Secondary School, a public school in Sexsmith, Canada
