= Sexsmith (surname) =

Sexsmith is an English surname, a variant of Sixsmith. Notable people with this surname include:

- Edward James Sexsmith (1865–1946), Canadian politician
- John Albert Sexsmith (1866–1943), Canadian politician
- Mr. and Mrs. John Wesley Sexsmith (fl. 1860s), Canadian founders of J. W. Sexsmith Elementary School
- Ron Sexsmith (born 1964), Canadian singer-songwriter
- Toby Sexsmith (1885–1943), Canadian politician
- Tyson Sexsmith (born 1989), Canadian hockey player

== See also ==
- Sexsmith (disambiguation)
