= Alberta Highway 884 =

Highway in Alberta, Canada

Highway 884

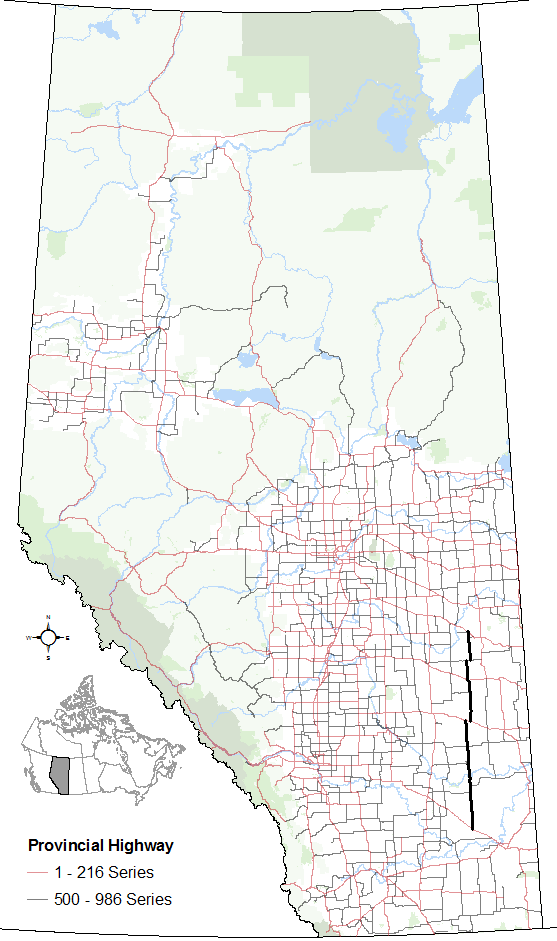

Route information
- Maintained by Alberta Transportation
- Length: 280 km (170 mi)

Major junctions
- South end: Highway 1 (TCH) in Suffield
- Highway 9 near Youngstown; Highway 12 in Veteran
- North end: Highway 13 in Amisk

Location
- Country: Canada
- Province: Alberta
- Specialized and rural municipalities: Cypress County, Special Areas, Paintearth County No. 18, Provost M.D. No. 52
- Villages: Youngstown, Veteran, Amisk

Highway system
- Alberta Provincial Highway Network; List; Former
← Highway 883	→ Highway 885

Alberta Provincial Highway No. 884, commonly referred to as Highway 884, is a highway in the province of Alberta, Canada. It runs south-north from Highway 1 in Suffield to Highway 13 in Amisk, between Highway 36 and Highway 41. This route is also known as 3 Street E in Youngstown. Its southern portion passes alongside and through CFB Suffield.

== Major intersections ==
Starting from the south end of Highway 884:

Rural/specialized municipality	Location	km	mi	Destinations	Notes
Cypress County	Suffield	0	0.0	Highway 1 (TCH) – Calgary, Brooks, Medicine Hat	Hwy 884 southern terminus 50.22056°N 111.17444°W
Cypress County		49	30	Highway 544 west – Patricia, Brooks	50.65972°N 111.18167°W
Special Area No. 2	Jenner	59	37	Highway 555 east – Buffalo	50.74583°N 111.18167°W
↑ / ↓		69	43	Crosses the Red Deer River — 50.83833°N 111.17667°W	
Special Area No. 3		92	57	Highway 561 west – Cessford	51.03750°N 111.19111°W
Special Area No. 3		111	69	Highway 570 – Sunnynook, Oyen	51.21222°N 111.19083°W
Special Area No. 3	Youngstown	146	91	Highway 9 west – Hanna, Calgary	Hwy 884 branches east; Hwy 9 concurrency begins 51.52500°N 111.20056°W
Special Area No. 3		153	95	Highway 9 east – Oyen, Saskatoon	Hwy 884 branches north; Hwy 9 concurrency ends 51.50333°N 111.10694°W
Special Area No. 4		192	119	Highway 586 west	51.85250°N 111.09167°W
Special Area No. 4		209	130	Highway 12 east – Consort	Hwy 884 branches west; Hwy 12 concurrency begins 51.99722°N 111.10028°W
Special Area No. 4	Veteran	210	130	Highway 12 west – Coronation, Stettler	Hwy 884 branches north; Hwy 12 concurrency ends 51.99722°N 111.11250°W
County of Paintearth No. 18		236	147	Highway 599 west – Castor	Hwy 884 branches east; Hwy 599 concurrency begins 52.23028°N 111.12389°W
County of Paintearth No. 18		241	150	Highway 599 east	Hwy 884 branches north; Hwy 599 concurrency ends 52.23000°N 111.05250°W
M.D. of Provost No. 52		273	170	Highway 603 east – Hughenden	52.50667°N 111.06056°W
M.D. of Provost No. 52	Amisk	279	173	Highway 608 west	52.56472°N 111.06639°W
M.D. of Provost No. 52	Amisk	280	170	Highway 13 – Camrose, Provost	Hwy 884 northern terminus 52.57083°N 111.06722°W
1.000 mi = 1.609 km; 1.000 km = 0.621 mi: Concurrency terminus
