= Blueberry Mountain, Alberta =

Coordinates: 55°55′36″N 119°08′59″W

Location of Blueberry Mountain Alberta

Blueberry Mountain is an unincorporated community in northwestern Alberta in Saddle Hills County, located on Highway 725, 91 kilometres (57 mi) north of Grande Prairie.

The community is located 5 kilometers (3.1 mi) east from Moonshine Lake Provincial Park, at an elevation of 655 meters (2,149 ft). It was first settled in 1919 by homesteaders from Saskatchewan and veterans returning from the war.
