= La Glace =

- Hamlet
- Location of La Glace in Alberta
- Coordinates: 55.4028°N 119.1542°W
- Country: Canada
- Province: Alberta
- Census division: No. 19
- Municipal district: County of Grande Prairie No. 1

Government
  - Type: Unincorporated
  - Reeve: Leanne Beaupre
  - Governing body: County of Grande Prairie No. 1 Council: Leanne Beaupre; Corey Beck; Daryl Beeston; Harold Bulford; Peter Harris; Bob Marshall; Karen Rosvold; Ross Sutherland; Linda Dianne Waddy

Area (2021)
  - Land: 0.81 km^{2} (0.31 sq mi)
- Elevation: 735 m (2,411 ft)

Population (2021)
  - Total: 179
  - Density: 221.8/km^{2} (574/sq mi)
- Time zone: UTC−06:00 (Alberta Time)

La Glace is a hamlet in northern Alberta, Canada within the County of Grande Prairie No. 1. It is located along Highway 59 between Sexsmith and Valhalla Centre and has an elevation of 735 metres (2,411 ft).

The hamlet is located in Census Division No. 19 and in the federal riding of Grande Prairie-Mackenzie.

== Demographics ==
Population history of La Glace
| Year | Pop. | ±% |
|---|---|---|
| 1941 | 45 | — |
| 1951 | 120 | +166.7% |
| 1956 | 119 | −0.8% |
| 1961 | 95 | −20.2% |
| 1966 | 102 | +7.4% |
| 1971 | 92 | −9.8% |
| 1976 | 136 | +47.8% |
| 1981 | 165 | +21.3% |
| 1986 | 191 | +15.8% |
| 1991 | 176 | −7.9% |
| 1991A | 178 | +1.1% |
| 1996 | 200 | +12.4% |
| 2001 | 213 | +6.5% |
| 2006 | 205 | −3.8% |
| 2011 | 181 | −11.7% |
| 2016 | 211 | +16.6% |
| 2021 | 179 | −15.2% |
Source: Statistics Canada

In the 2021 Census of Population conducted by Statistics Canada, La Glace had a population of 179 living in 68 of its 77 total private dwellings, a change of −15.2% from its 2016 population of 211. With a land area of 0.81 km^{2} (0.31 sq mi), it had a population density of 221.0/km^{2} (572.4/sq mi) in 2021.

As a designated place in the 2016 Census of Population conducted by Statistics Canada, La Glace had a population of 211 living in 78 of its 90 total private dwellings, a change of 16.6% from its 2011 population of 181. With a land area of 0.81 km^{2} (0.31 sq mi), it had a population density of 260.5/km^{2} (674.7/sq mi) in 2016.

== See also ==
- List of communities in Alberta
- List of designated places in Alberta
- List of hamlets in Alberta
