= Amisk, Alberta =

Amisk
- Village
- Village of Amisk
- Location within Alberta
- Coordinates: 52°34′0″N 111°3′39″W
- Country: Canada
- Province: Alberta
- Region: Central Alberta
- Census division: 7
- Municipal district: Municipal District of Provost No. 52
- Incorporated
  - Village: January 1, 1956
- Named for: Beaver

Government
  - Mayor: Bill Rock
  - Governing body: Amisk Village Council

Area (2021)
  - Land: 0.76 km^{2} (0.29 sq mi)
- Elevation: 910 m (2,990 ft)

Population (2021)
  - Total: 219
  - Density: 288/km^{2} (750/sq mi)
- Time zone: UTC−06:00 (Alberta Time)
- Highways: Highway 13; Highway 306; Highway 884
- Website: www.amisk.ca

Amisk (/ˈæmɪsk/) is a village in east central Alberta, Canada.

The name comes from amisk (ᐊᒥᐢᐠ), the Cree word for "beaver".

The site was surveyed by the Canadian Pacific Railway in 1906. That same year settlers from the United States, Scandinavia and Great Britain arrived. The first general store was built in 1907, and the school went up in 1916. Amisk boasts the oldest registered public library in rural Alberta.

== Demographics ==
In the 2021 Census of Population conducted by Statistics Canada, the Village of Amisk had a population of 219 living in 86 of its 105 total private dwellings, a change of 7.4% from its 2016 population of 204. With a land area of 0.76 km^{2} (0.29 sq mi), it had a population density of 288.2/km^{2} (746.3/sq mi) in 2021.

In the 2016 Census of Population conducted by Statistics Canada, the Village of Amisk recorded a population of 204 living in 84 of its 103 total private dwellings, a −1.4% change from its 2011 population of 207. With a land area of 0.76 km^{2} (0.29 sq mi), it had a population density of 268.4/km^{2} (695.2/sq mi) in 2016.

== See also ==
- Amisk (disambiguation)
- List of communities in Alberta
- List of villages in Alberta
