= Youngstown, Alberta =

Village in Alberta, Canada

Youngstown
- Village
- Village of Youngstown
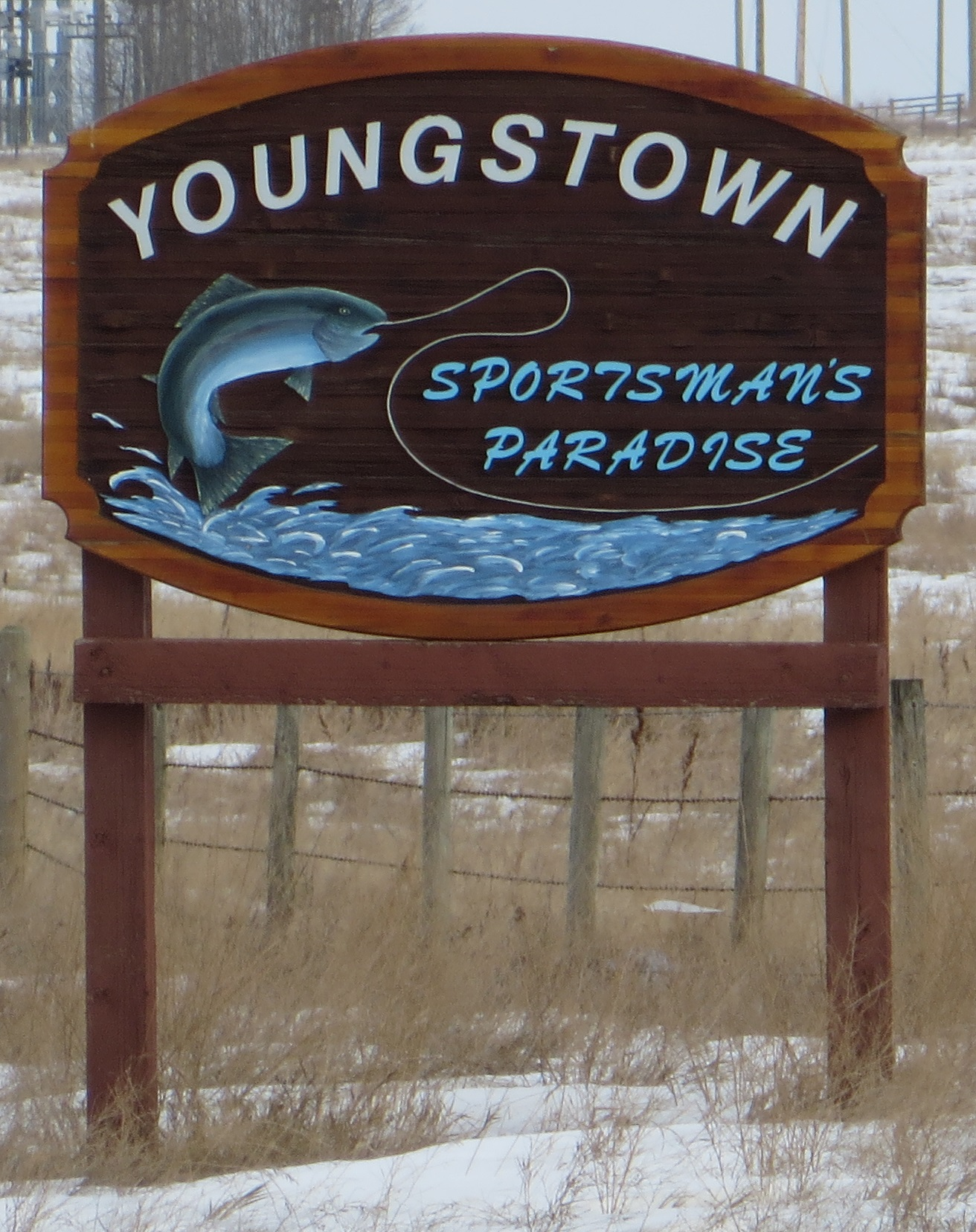
- Nickname: Sportsman's Paradise
- Location in Special Area No. 3

- Location within Alberta Location within Canada
- Coordinates: 51°31′29″N 111°11′55″W
- Country: Canada
- Province: Alberta
- Region: Southern Alberta
- Census division: 4
- Special Area: No. 3
- Incorporated
  - Village: March 8, 1913
  - Town: November 15, 1921
  - Village: December 31, 1936

Government
  - Mayor: Robert Blagen
  - Governing body: Youngstown Village Council

Area (2021)
  - Land: 1.11 km^{2} (0.43 sq mi)
- Elevation: 780 m (2,560 ft)

Population (2021)
  - Total: 171
  - Density: 154.7/km^{2} (401/sq mi)
- Time zone: UTC−06:00 (Alberta Time)
- Highways: Highway 9 Highway 884
- Waterways: Sounding Creek
- Website: youngstown.ca

Youngstown is a village in southern Alberta, Canada, within Special Area No. 3. The village refers to itself as a Sportsman's Paradise due to plenty of wild game and trout fishing in the area.

== Demographics ==
In the 2021 Census of Population conducted by Statistics Canada, the Village of Youngstown had a population of 171 living in 77 of its 95 total private dwellings, a change of 11% from its 2016 population of 154. With a land area of 1.11 km^{2} (0.43 sq mi), it had a population density of 154.1/km^{2} (399.0/sq mi) in 2021.

In the 2016 Census of Population conducted by Statistics Canada, the Village of Youngstown recorded a population of 154 living in 68 of its 88 total private dwellings, a −13.5% change from its 2011 population of 178. With a land area of 1.11 km^{2} (0.43 sq mi), it had a population density of 138.7/km^{2} (359.3/sq mi) in 2016.

== See also ==
- List of communities in Alberta
- List of villages in Alberta
