= Amisk =

Amisk is a Cree word for beaver. Amisk may also refer to:

- Amisk Lake, an important lake in Saskatchewan on the main fur trade route
- Amisk Lake (Alberta), a small lake in the Beaver River Basin
- Amisk River, a river flowing from this lake
- Amisk, Alberta, a village unrelated to the two lakes
- Amiskwi River, a river in British Columbia (from the Cree word for Beavertail)
- Amiskwia, a fossil
