= County of Stettler No. 6 =

Municipal district in Alberta, Canada

Coordinates: 52°19′25″N 112°43′9″W

- Municipal district
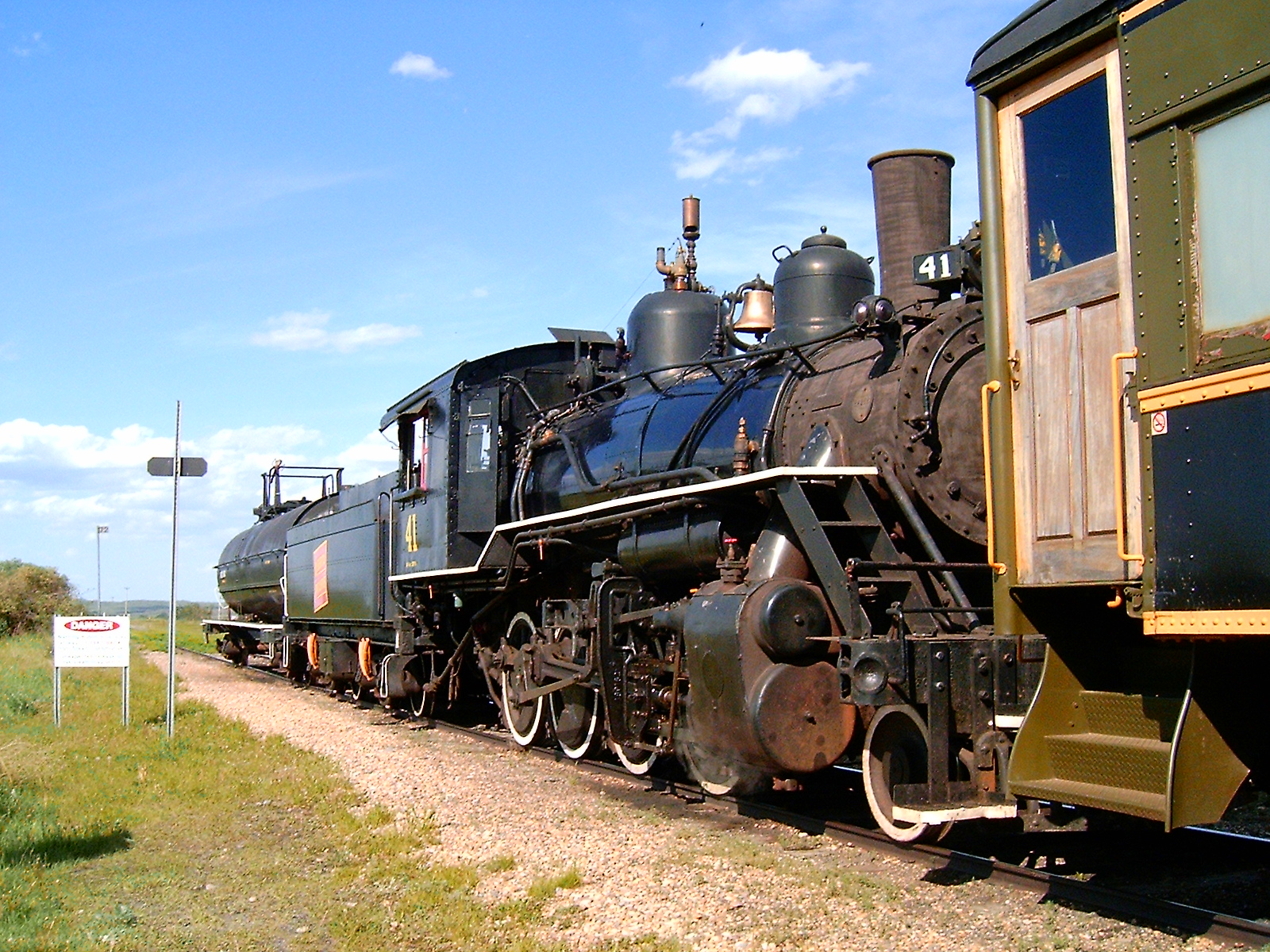
- Engine 41 of the Alberta Prairie Railway

- Major communities

- Location within Alberta
- Country: Canada
- Province: Alberta
- Region: Central Alberta
- Planning region: Red Deer
- Established: 1943
- Incorporated: 1955 (County)

Government
  - Reeve: Larry Clarke
  - Governing body: County of Stettler Council
  - Administrative office: Stettler

Area (2021)
  - Land: 3,969.65 km^{2} (1,532.69 sq mi)

Population (2021)
  - Total: 5,666
  - Density: 1.4/km^{2} (3.6/sq mi)
- Time zone: UTC−06:00 (Alberta Time)
- Website: stettlercounty.ca

The County of Stettler No. 6 is a municipal district in central Alberta, Canada.

== Geography ==
=== Communities and localities ===
The following urban municipalities are surrounded by the Stettler County No. 6.

Cities

- none

Towns

- Stettler

Villages

- Big Valley
- Donalda

Summer villages

- Rochon Sands
- White Sands

The following hamlets are located within the County of Stettler No. 6.

Hamlets

- Botha (dissolved from village status on September 1, 2017)
- Byemoor
- Endiang
- Erskine
- Gadsby (dissolved from village status on February 1, 2020)
- Nevis
- Red Willow

The following localities are located within the County of Stettler No. 6.

Localities

- Anderson Addition
- Bolin Subdivision
- Caprona
- Fenn
- Gopher Head
- Hackett
- Hartshorn
- Heart Lake
- Leahurst
- Leo
- Nevis Junction
- Oberlin
- Repp Addition
- Repp Subdivision
- Sabine
- Scollard
- Warden
- Warden Junction
- Willowglen Estates

Other places

- Cordel

== Demographics ==
In the 2021 Census of Population conducted by Statistics Canada, the County of Stettler No. 6 had a population of 5,666 living in 1,945 of its 2,310 total private dwellings, a change of 1.8% from its 2016 population of 5,566. With a land area of 3,969.65 km^{2} (1,532.69 sq mi), it had a population density of 1.4/km^{2} (3.7/sq mi) in 2021.

In the 2016 Census of Population conducted by Statistics Canada, the County of Stettler No. 6 had a population of 5,322 living in 1,850 of its 2,137 total private dwellings, a 4.3% change from its 2011 population of 5,103. With a land area of 4,018.84 km^{2} (1,551.68 sq mi), it had a population density of 1.3/km^{2} (3.4/sq mi) in 2016.

== See also ==
- List of communities in Alberta
- List of municipal districts in Alberta
