= Scollard, Alberta =

Coordinates: 49°11′06″N 113°09′55″W

Scollard is a locality in central Alberta, Canada within the County of Stettler No. 6. It is located on Range Road 344, 8.4 km (5 mi) west of Highway 21. It is approximately 12.7 km (7.9 mi) south of Big Valley.

The locality is within census division No. 7 and the federal riding of Crowfoot.

== See also ==
- List of communities in Alberta
