= Leo, Alberta =

Coordinates: 52.0548°N 112.3582°W

Leo is a locality in central Alberta, Canada within the County of Stettler No. 6. It is located on Range Road 360, approximately 17 km (11 mi) west of Highway 855. It is approximately 45 km (28 mi) east of Big Valley, located between Gough Lake and Cutbank Lake.

The locality is in census division No. 7 and the federal riding of Crowfoot.

== See also ==
- List of communities in Alberta
