= Alberta Highway 59 =

Highway in Alberta, Canada

Highway 59

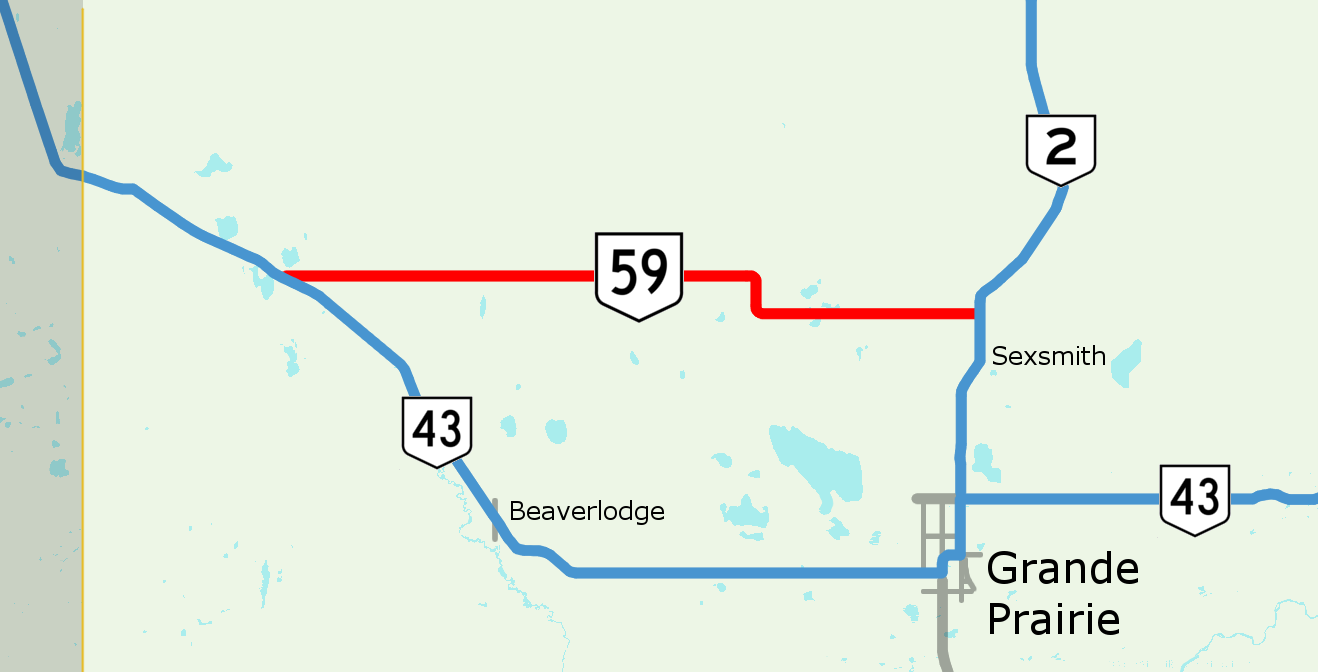

Route information
- Maintained by the Ministry of Transportation and Economic Corridors
- Length: 63.2 km (39.3 mi)

Major junctions
- West end: Highway 43 northwest of Hythe
- East end: Highway 2 north of Sexsmith

Location
- Country: Canada
- Province: Alberta
- Specialized and rural municipalities: County of Grande Prairie No. 1
- Towns: Sexsmith

Highway system
- Alberta Provincial Highway Network; List; Former
← Highway 58	→ Highway 60

Alberta Provincial Highway No. 59, commonly referred to as Highway 59, is an east–west highway in northwest Alberta, Canada. It runs from Highway 2 north of Sexsmith to Highway 43 northwest of Hythe.

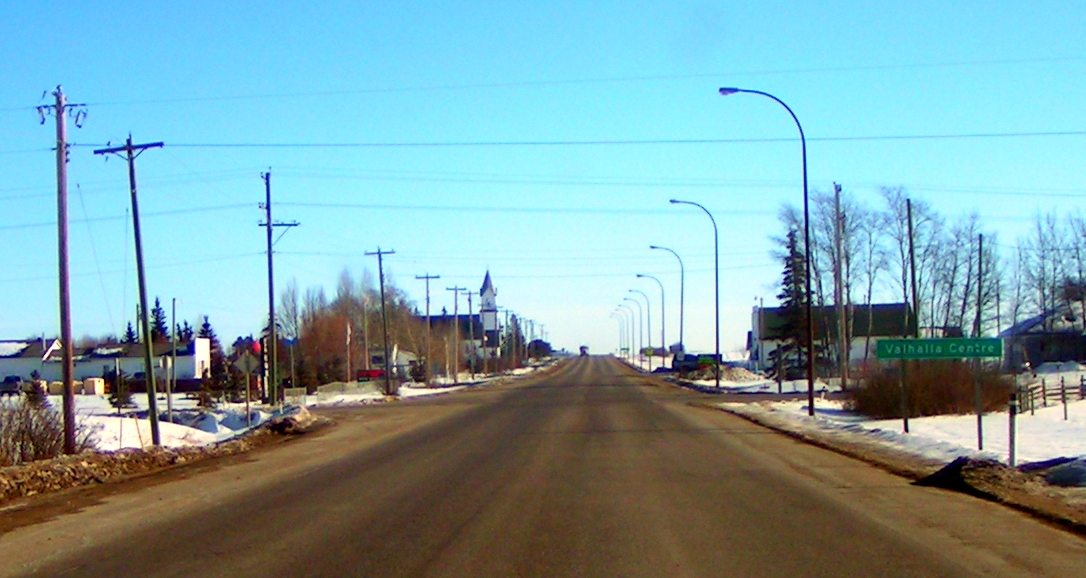
Highway 59 through Valhalla Centre

== Major intersections ==
The entire route is in Grande Prairie County.

Location	km	mi	Destinations	Notes
	0.0	0.0	Highway 43 – Grande Prairie, Dawson Creek	Highway 59 western terminus
	9.9	6.2	Highway 721 south – Hythe	
Valhalla Centre	21.3	13.2	Highway 723 south – Beaverlodge	
La Glace	35.9	22.3	Highway 724 south – Wembley	West end of Highway 724 concurrency
	40.2	25.0	Highway 724 north	East end of Highway 724 concurrency
Sexsmith	63.2	39.3	Highway 2 – Rycroft, Grande Prairie Highway 674 east – Teepee Creek	Highway 59 eastern terminus; continues as Highway 674
1.000 mi = 1.609 km; 1.000 km = 0.621 mi: Concurrency terminus
