= Sixsmith =

Sixsmith is an English occupational surname, for someone who made plowshares ("sok", 'plowshare' + "smith"). Variants: Sexsmith, Sucksmith, Shucksmith. Notable people with the surname include:

- Arthur Sixsmith (1880–1969), Canadian ice hockey rover and businessman
- Ed Sixsmith (1863–1926), American baseball catcher
- Eric Sixsmith (1904–1986), British Army general
- Garnet Sixsmith (1885–1967), Canadian ice hockey player
- Jane Sixsmith (born 1967), British field hockey player, Olympic bronze medallist
- Martin Sixsmith (born 1954), British author, journalist and radio/television presenter
- Paul Sixsmith (born 1971), Maltese international footballer

== Fictional characters ==
- Rufus Sixsmith, character in 2012 film Cloud Atlas
