= Valhalla Centre =

- Hamlet
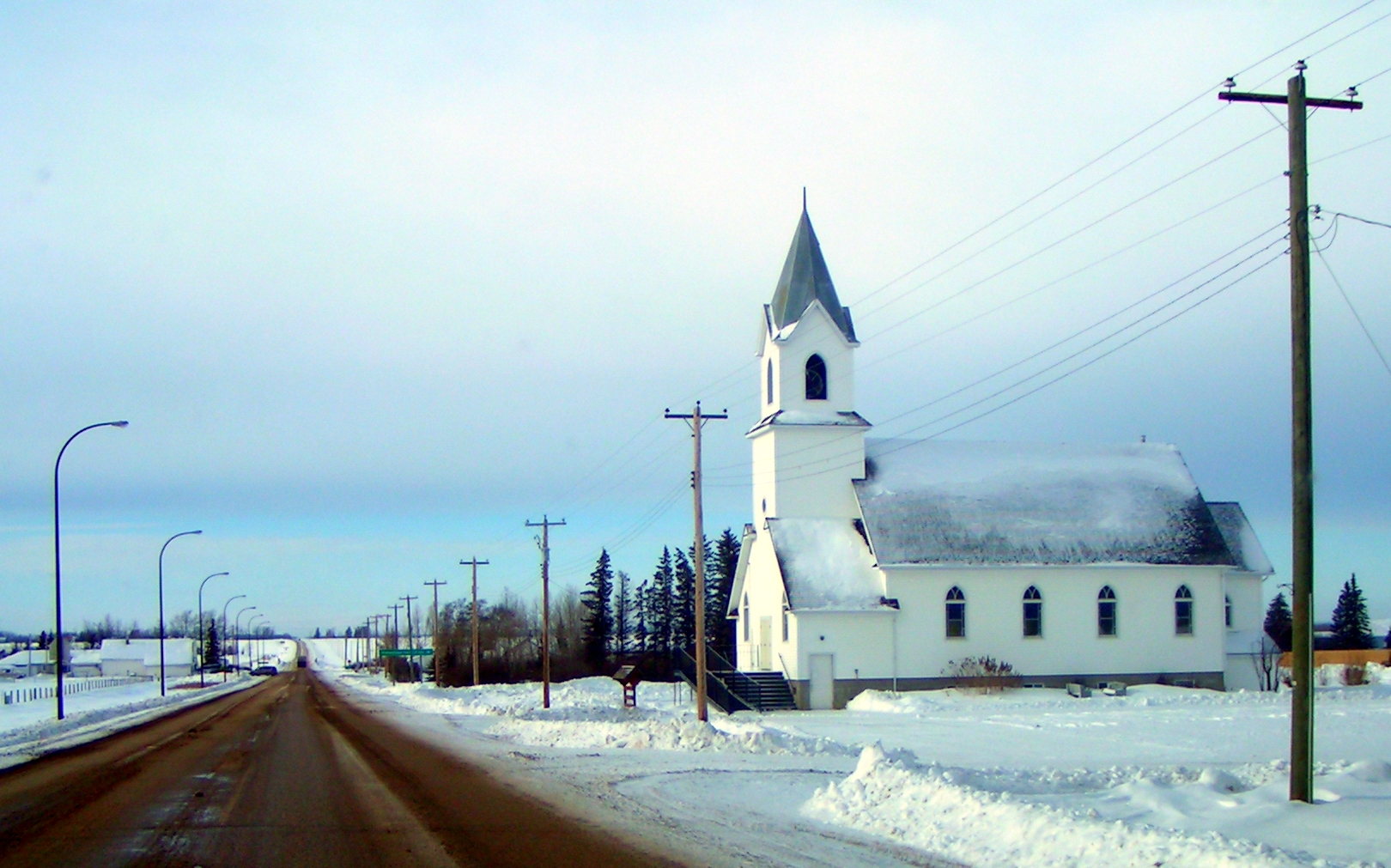
- Valhalla Lutheran Church

- Location of Valhalla Centre in Alberta
- Coordinates: 55.4036°N 119.3819°W
- Country: Canada
- Province: Alberta
- Census division: No. 19
- Municipal district: County of Grande Prairie No. 1

Government
  - Type: Unincorporated
  - Reeve: Leanne Beaupre
  - Governing body: County of Grande Prairie No. 1 Council: Leanne Beaupre; Corey Beck; Daryl Beeston; Harold Bulford; Peter Harris; Bob Marshall; Karen Rosvold; Ross Sutherland; Linda Dianne Waddy

Area (2021)
  - Land: 1.22 km^{2} (0.47 sq mi)
- Elevation: 735 m (2,411 ft)

Population (2021)
  - Total: 40
  - Density: 32.7/km^{2} (85/sq mi)
- Time zone: UTC−06:00 (Alberta Time)

Valhalla Centre is a hamlet in northern Alberta, Canada within the County of Grande Prairie No. 1.

It is located in the Peace River Country at the junction of Highway 59 and Highway 723, northeast of the Village of Hythe and west of the Town of Sexsmith. It is approximately 40 kilometres (25 mi) east of the British Columbia border and has an elevation of 735 metres (2,411 ft).

The hamlet is located in Census Division No. 19 and in the federal riding of Peace River.

== History ==
The hamlet was founded in 1912 by Scandinavians that moved north from Edson. It was named by Reverend Halvar N. Ronning after Valhalla, Odin's hall in Norse mythology. The first post office was established in 1916. The settlement grew around a creamery until 1945. The Melsness Mercantile building was built in 1925, and functioned as a store and post office until 1951. Today it hosts a museum dedicated to the Scandinavian heritage of the area, and was declared a Provincial Historic Site.

== Demographics ==
Population history of Valhalla Centre
Year	Pop.	±%
1941	59	—
1951	79	+33.9%
1956	67	−15.2%
1961	58	−13.4%
1966	59	+1.7%
1971	36	−39.0%
1976	32	−11.1%
1981	45	+40.6%
1986	48	+6.7%
1991	42	−12.5%
1991A	44	+4.8%
1996	48	+9.1%
2001	52	+8.3%
2006	60	+15.4%
2011	45	−25.0%
2016	15	−66.7%
2021	40	+166.7%
Source: Statistics Canada

In the 2021 Census of Population conducted by Statistics Canada, Valhalla Centre had a population of 40 living in 19 of its 22 total private dwellings, a change of 166.7% from its 2016 population of 15. With a land area of 1.22 km^{2} (0.47 sq mi), it had a population density of 32.8/km^{2} (84.9/sq mi) in 2021.

As a designated place in the 2016 Census of Population conducted by Statistics Canada, Valhalla Centre had a population of 15 living in 9 of its 9 total private dwellings, a change of −66.7% from its 2011 population of 45. With a land area of 1.22 km^{2} (0.47 sq mi), it had a population density of 12.3/km^{2} (31.8/sq mi) in 2016.

== Economy ==
The economy is centred on farming and stock raising.

== Amenities ==
The hamlet has a church (Valhalla Lutheran Church), curling rink, cafe (Mercantile cafe), store, skating rink, museum (Melsness Mercantile) and K-8 school (Valhalla Community School). The school is one of 13 publicly funded Alberta Chartered Schools.

== See also ==
- List of communities in Alberta
- List of designated places in Alberta
- List of hamlets in Alberta
