= Byemoor =

- Hamlet
- Location of Byemoor in Alberta
- Coordinates: 51.9728°N 112.2867°W
- Country: Canada
- Province: Alberta
- Census division: No. 7
- Municipal district: County of Stettler No. 6

Government
  - Type: Unincorporated
  - Governing body: County of Stettler No. 6 Council. Byemoor - Endiang Ward Councillor - Les Stulberg

Area (2021)
  - Land: 0.59 km^{2} (0.23 sq mi)
- Elevation: 845 m (2,772 ft)

Population (2021)
  - Total: 30
  - Density: 51.1/km^{2} (132/sq mi)
- Time zone: UTC−06:00 (Alberta Time)

Byemoor is a hamlet in Alberta, Canada within the County of Stettler No. 6. It is located at the intersection of Highway 853 and Highway 589, approximately 70 kilometres (43 mi) southeast of Stettler and 80 kilometres (50 mi) northeast of Drumheller. It has an elevation of 845 metres (2,772 ft).

Byemoor's closest neighbour is the hamlet of Endiang, which is approximately 10 kilometres (6.2 mi) to the east.

The hamlet is located in Census Division No. 7 and in the federal riding of Crowfoot.

== History ==
Byemoor was built in the early twentieth century along the railroad line, and was so named for the area's resemblance to a moor in England (Byemoor name originates from "By-the-moor") In its early years, it was an important centre as it was the main town for a large number of small farms. Crises in agriculture and improvement of transportation to larger centres, however, led to the slow depopulation of the hamlet and area.

== Demographics ==
Population history of Byemoor
Year	Pop.	±%
1941	87	—
1951	84	−3.4%
1956	106	+26.2%
1961	129	+21.7%
1966	108	−16.3%
1971	60	−44.4%
1976	35	−41.7%
1981	46	+31.4%
1986	51	+10.9%
1991	39	−23.5%
1991A	39	+0.0%
1996	39	+0.0%
2001	40	+2.6%
2006	50	+25.0%
2011	35	−30.0%
2016	35	+0.0%
2021	30	−14.3%
Source: Statistics Canada

In the 2021 Census of Population conducted by Statistics Canada, Byemoor had a population of 30 living in 14 of its 19 total private dwellings, a change of −14.3% from its 2016 population of 35. With a land area of 0.59 km^{2} (0.23 sq mi), it had a population density of 50.8/km^{2} (131.7/sq mi) in 2021.

As a designated place in the 2016 Census of Population conducted by Statistics Canada, Byemoor had a population of 35 living in 18 of its 22 total private dwellings, a change of 0% from its 2011 population of 35. With a land area of 0.68 km^{2} (0.26 sq mi), it had a population density of 51.5/km^{2} (133.3/sq mi) in 2016.

== Services and infrastructure ==
Byemoor is home to a small hotel, arena, community hall, curling rink, St. Paul's Anglican Church and Byemoor School (elementary/junior high school) all of which service the small farming community, as well as some minor oil field offices.

== See also ==
- List of communities in Alberta
- List of designated places in Alberta
- List of hamlets in Alberta
