= Endiang =

Community in Alberta, Canada

- Hamlet
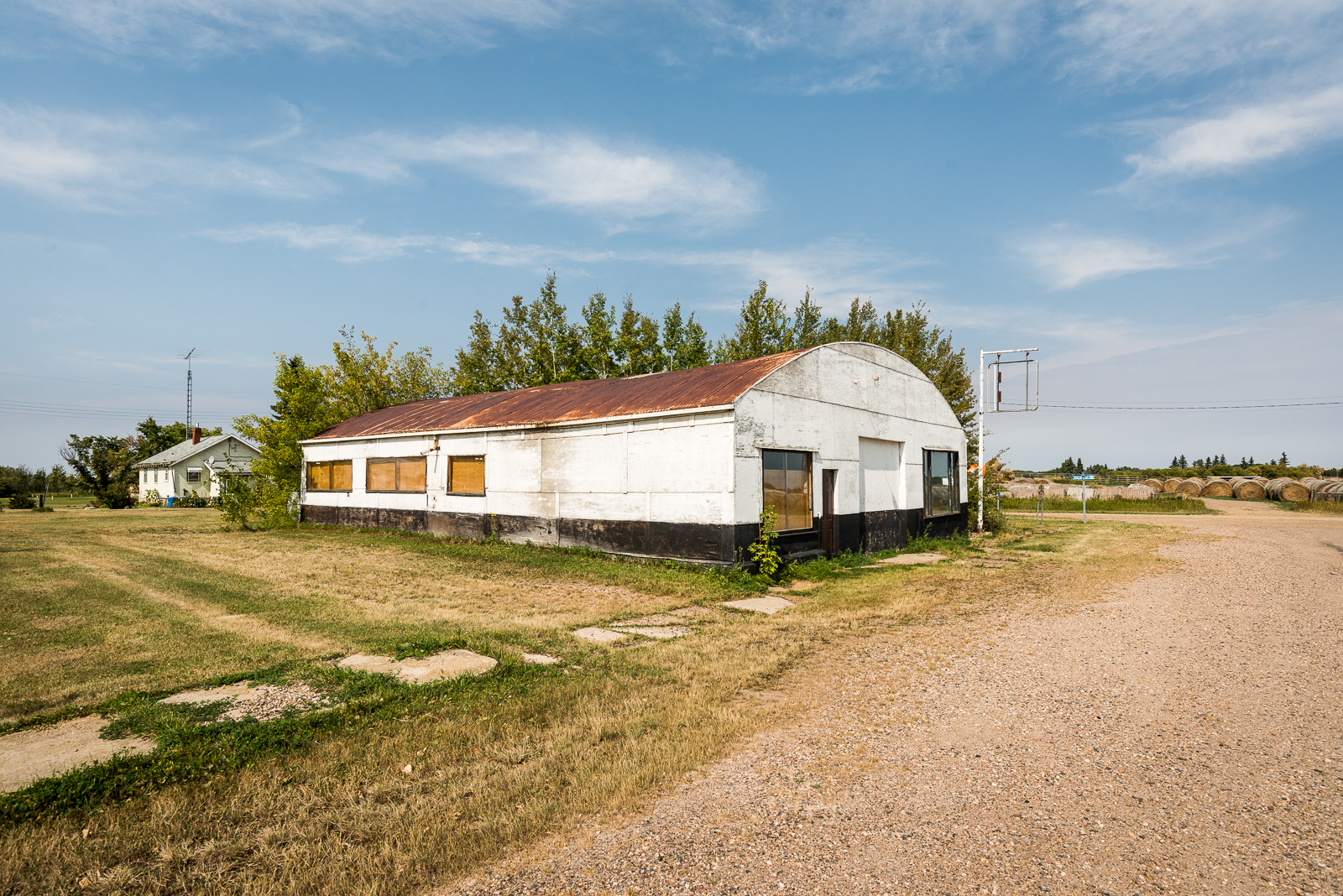

- Location of Endiang in Alberta Endiang (Canada)
- Coordinates: 51.9539°N 112.1583°W
- Country: Canada
- Province: Alberta
- Census division: No. 7
- Municipal district: County of Stettler No. 6

Government
  - Type: Unincorporated
  - Governing body: County of Stettler No. 6 Council
  - Area councillor: Les Stulberg

Area (2021)
  - Land: 0.61 km^{2} (0.24 sq mi)
- Elevation: 870 m (2,850 ft)

Population (2021)
  - Total: 15
  - Density: 24.5/km^{2} (63/sq mi)
- Time zone: UTC−06:00 (Alberta Time)

Endiang (/ˈɛndiːæŋ/) is a hamlet in Alberta, Canada, within the County of Stettler No. 6. It is approximately 80 kilometres (50 mi) southeast of Stettler.

Although Endiang enjoyed fair prosperity in the early years of the 20th century, the Great Depression, World War II, and better transportation have led to the depopulation of the local farming community, and with it, of the hamlet. In former years, Endiang was home to a post office, two general stores, two hardware stores, a bank, a train station, grain elevators, a hotel and pool hall, a gas station, a tractor dealership, a lumber yard, and all the other establishment expected in most communities. Today, Endiang is still home to a community hall and a restaurant.

The hamlet is located in Census Division No. 7 and in the federal riding of Battle River—Crowfoot.

== History ==
A little known fact about Endiang is that during the Cold War it was considered the place most likely for conflict between the U.S.S.R. and the U.S.A. to begin. If the Soviet Union were to have fired a missile first, and the American military were to respond, it was considered likely that the two missiles would collide over Endiang. This fact was immortalised in the poem "Armageddon at Endiang, Alberta".

An interesting bit of history is that the original settlement of Endiang was located about 5 kilometers northeast of the present hamlet and was established by William Foreman on his homestead in 1910. It was named for a summer resort hotel the Foreman family owned in the Muskoka Lakes region of Ontario, named "Endiang", from the Anishinaabe language Endaayaang, meaning "our home". The tiny settlement included a post office, a store, and a hall. When the CNR built a railroad through the area in 1925, it missed the original settlement, so with the aid of horse power, the buildings were moved to the new site of Endiang.

Endiang is also notable for being the home to the Shaben family, some of whom were involved in the establishment of the first mosque in Alberta.

The history of the Endiang area was first recorded in local author Jean James' book This Was Endiang. In 2002 the history of the area was updated with family histories included in the book Endiang - Our Home. The latest 650 page history book was the project of the Endiang History Book Committee.

== Geography ==
Endiang is located on a plain bounded by ranges of hills to the west and south, and by Sullivan Lake, a large alkali lake to the east. The Chain Lakes lie to the southwest. Its geography and climate is similar to that of most other prairie areas of East-Central and Southern Alberta, experiencing cold winters broken up by Chinook winds, and warm, dry summers. In recent years, Endiang has experienced both extreme droughts and extreme wet conditions, having a great impact on the local farming community, although this sort of weather pattern is typical of other such areas found in Palliser's Triangle.

Endiang's closest neighbour is the small hamlet of Byemoor, located about 8 miles (13 km) to the west. Together the two communities are commonly referred to as "Endmoor".

== Demographics ==
In the 2021 Census of Population conducted by Statistics Canada, Endiang had a population of 15 living in 11 of its 15 total private dwellings, a change of 0% from its 2016 population of 15. With a land area of 0.61 km^{2} (0.24 sq mi), it had a population density of 24.6/km^{2} (63.7/sq mi) in 2021.

As a designated place in the 2016 Census of Population conducted by Statistics Canada, Endiang had a population of 15 living in 8 of its 16 total private dwellings, a change of −57.1% from its 2011 population of 35. With a land area of 0.63 km^{2} (0.24 sq mi), it had a population density of 23.8/km^{2} (61.7/sq mi) in 2016.

== Notable people ==
- NHL hockey player Darcy Tucker, who played for Montreal, Tampa Bay, Toronto, and Colorado, was raised in Endiang, and his family still resides there.

== See also ==
- List of communities in Alberta
- List of designated places in Alberta
- List of hamlets in Alberta
