= Sexsmith Secondary School =

Location
- 9401 99 Ave; Sexsmith, Alberta, T0H 3C0; Canada; 55°20′59.10″N 118°46′33.93″W

Information
- School type: Public, Secondary School
- Motto: Educating for Empowerment: Striving for Success: Learning for Life
- Founded: 1954
- School board: Peace Wapiti School Division No. 76
- Principal: Allison Lario
- Staff: 38
- Grades: 7-12
- Enrollment: 550+ (2026)
- Language: English
- Campus: Rural
- Colours: Red, Gold and Black
- Team name: Sabres
- Website: sss.pwpsd.ca

Sexsmith Secondary School is the only public secondary school in Sexsmith, Alberta, and is part of the Peace Wapiti School Division No. 76. The school serves all of Sexsmith and the surrounding communities.

The school was built in 1954 and fully modernized in 1991. All core subjects are offered at Sexsmith Secondary School and many electives as well. Extracurricular activities are also offered at the school.
