= Moonshine Lake Provincial Park =

Provincial park in Alberta, Canada

Coordinates: 55°52′47″N 119°12′56″W

Moonshine Lake Provincial Park is a provincial park located in Alberta, Canada.

Located 27 km west and 7 km north of Spirit River, on Highway 49.
