= Dapp, Alberta =

Dapp
- Hamlet
- Location of Dapp Dapp (Canada)
- Coordinates: 54°20′42″N 113°54′57″W
- Country: Canada
- Province: Alberta
- Region: Central Alberta
- Census division: 13
- Municipal district: Westlock County

Government
  - Type: Unincorporated
  - Governing body: Westlock County Council

Area (2021)
  - Land: 0.31 km^{2} (0.12 sq mi)

Population (2021)
  - Total: 30
  - Density: 95.8/km^{2} (248/sq mi)
- Time zone: UTC−06:00 (Alberta Time)
- Area codes: 780, 587, 825

Dapp is a hamlet in central Alberta, Canada within Westlock County. It is located 4 kilometres (2.5 mi) west of Highway 44, approximately 81 kilometres (50 mi) northwest of St. Albert.

== Demographics ==
Population history of Dapp
Year	Pop.	±%
1941	43	—
1951	77	+79.1%
1956	72	−6.5%
1961	71	−1.4%
1966	66	−7.0%
1971	62	−6.1%
1976	43	−30.6%
1981	41	−4.7%
1986	30	−26.8%
1991	26	−13.3%
1996	29	+11.5%
2001	27	−6.9%
2006	26	−3.7%
2011	34	+30.8%
2016	10	−70.6%
2016R	20	+100.0%
2021	30	+50.0%
Source: Statistics Canada

In the 2021 Census of Population conducted by Statistics Canada, Dapp had a population of 30 living in 13 of its 17 total private dwellings, a change of 50% from its 2016 population of 20. With a land area of 0.31 km^{2} (0.12 sq mi), it had a population density of 96.8/km^{2} (250.6/sq mi) in 2021.

As a designated place in the 2016 Census of Population conducted by Statistics Canada, Dapp had a population of 10 living in 4 of its 5 total private dwellings, a change of −70.6% from its 2011 population of 34. With a land area of 0.2 km^{2} (0.077 sq mi), it had a population density of 50.0/km^{2} (129.5/sq mi) in 2016.

== History ==
The community derives its name from the initials of David A. Pennicuick, a railroad official.

In 1985, one of the last two traditional wooden grain elevators in Alberta was built in Dapp by the Alberta Wheat Pool. Dapp Hotel was built in 1948 and one of the first dwellings reported, was built in 1945, possibly the first house in the community.

== Notable residents ==
- Greg Polis, professional ice hockey player (National Hockey League), 1970s

== See also ==
- List of communities in Alberta
- List of designated places in Alberta
- List of hamlets in Alberta
