= Bay Tree, Alberta =

Coordinates: 55°49′30″N 119°54′22″W

Location of Bay Tree Alberta

Bay Tree is an unincorporated community in northern Alberta in Saddle Hills County, located on Highway 49, 100 kilometres (62 mi) northwest of Grande Prairie.

== Etymology ==
The origin of the name “Bay Tree” is generally attributed to local oral tradition. According to accounts passed down within the community, an early settler, Joshua McClellan, identified a distinctive grouping of trees located near a shallow, bay-like depression in the surrounding landscape. Early residents are said to have referred to the area informally as “The Bay Tree,” a name that reflected both the natural landform and the prominent stand of trees.

Over time, the name came into broader use and was eventually adopted for the locality itself. Although this explanation is widely accepted within the community, it is not definitively supported by early written records and remains based primarily on oral history. "Alberta Geographical Names Data Base". Natural Resources Canada.
