= Sunset House, Alberta =

Coordinates: 55°06′40″N 116°53′59″W

Location of Sunset House Alberta

Sunset House is an unincorporated community in northern Alberta within the Municipal District of Greenview No. 16. It is located 23 kilometres (14 mi) east of Highway 49, 121 kilometres (75 mi) east of Grande Prairie.
