= J. W. Sexsmith Elementary School =

J.W. Sexsmith Community Elementary
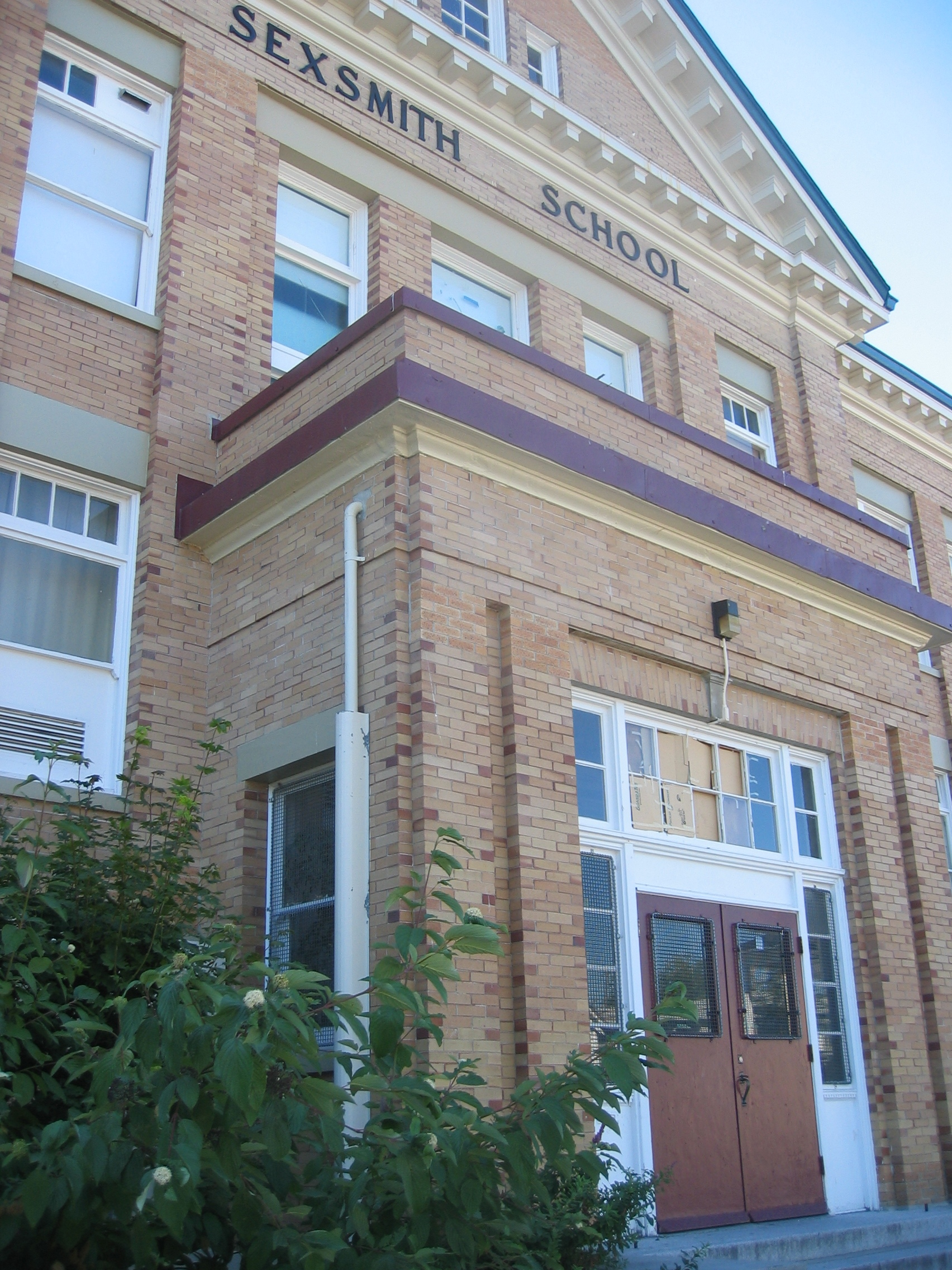

Location
- Vancouver, British Columbia, V5X; Canada; 49.2172°N 123.1069°W

Information
- School type: Public, Elementary school
- School board: School District 39 Vancouver
- School number: 3939063
- Grades: K-7
- Enrollment: 404 (January 16, 2006)

J.W. Sexsmith Community Elementary is a public elementary school in Vancouver, British Columbia part of School District 39 Vancouver.

In February 2016, the original J.W. Sexsmith School was torn down. On October 13, 2013 the new building was officially opened at the back of the schoolground. A new road was put in that connects Columbia St. The new address for the school is J.W. Sexsmith School, 7410 Columbia St, Vancouver, BC V5X.

== History ==
John Wesley Sexsmith was born in Richmond, County of Lennox, Ontario on May 10, 1830, to parents who were both members of United Empire Loyalist families. Educated in the common schools of Ontario, Sexsmith entered the lumber business and also tried his hand as a general merchant and established a cheese factory. Sexsmith soon encountered financial hardships and decided to try out his fortune in the West.

Mr. Sexsmith's westward journey eventually brought him to a plot of land on what was then known as Lulu Island. Drawing from his experience back in Ontario, Sexsmith established a cheese factory and soon grew so successful that he extended his land holdings to some 1,900 acres (7.7 km^{2}) on Lulu Island as well as several hundred acres in modern-day Pitt Meadows. To overcome transportation difficulties, Sexsmith established a boat service on the North Fraser River to New Westminster.

As the population of the area gradually increased, Sexsmith became active in the organization of the district into the Municipality of Richmond and served as its Reeve. For a number of years, Sexsmith was largely responsible for the building of bridges to join Marpole, Sea Island and Lulu Island.

Both Mr. and Mrs. Sexsmith was actively involved in teaching. Mrs. Sexsmith, one of the first teachers in the area with professional qualifications, taught at a school in Gastown provided by the Moodyville Lumber Company. Mr. Sexsmith established a Ryerson System school to provide education for the surrounding families. The school was one of the first of the strictly rural schools established on the mainland of British Columbia.

== Activities ==
Basketball, volleyball, badminton, safety patrol, track and field, music, soccer, MetoWe.

Every other year, Sexsmith Elementary puts on a play put on by the students of Sexsmith in grades 6 and 7 and organized and directed by two teachers of the school. In the past, these plays have been, The Wizard of Oz, The Lion King, Aladdin and more. 3C1
