= Jenner, Alberta =

Jenner
- Hamlet
- Location of Jenner Jenner (Canada)
- Coordinates: 50°44′48″N 111°11′04″W
- Country: Canada
- Province: Alberta
- Region: Southern Alberta
- Census division: 4
- Special area: Special Area No. 2

Government
  - Type: Unincorporated
  - Governing body: Special Areas Board

Population
  - Total: 15
- Time zone: UTC−06:00 (Alberta Time)
- Area codes: 403, 587, 825

Jenner is a hamlet in southern Alberta, Canada within Special Area No. 2. It is located approximately 43 kilometres (27 mi) northeast of Highway 1 and 54 kilometres (34 mi) northeast of Brooks. Previously an incorporated community, Jenner dissolved from village status on June 25, 1943.

== Climate ==
Jenner has a semi-arid, continental climate (Köppen climate classification BSk), with cold, dry winters and warm to hot summers.

Climate data for Jenner, Alberta
Month	Jan	Feb	Mar	Apr	May	Jun	Jul	Aug	Sep	Oct	Nov	Dec	Year
Record high °C (°F)	16.7 (62.1)	19.0 (66.2)	26.0 (78.8)	33.3 (91.9)	36.1 (97.0)	40.0 (104.0)	42.2 (108.0)	40.0 (104.0)	35.6 (96.1)	31.1 (88.0)	29.4 (84.9)	20.0 (68.0)	42.2 (108.0)
Mean daily maximum °C (°F)	−4.6 (23.7)	−0.7 (30.7)	4.6 (40.3)	13.3 (55.9)	19.2 (66.6)	23.3 (73.9)	27.5 (81.5)	26.8 (80.2)	20.6 (69.1)	12.7 (54.9)	2.7 (36.9)	−2.0 (28.4)	12.0 (53.6)
Daily mean °C (°F)	−11 (12)	−7.1 (19.2)	−1.8 (28.8)	5.7 (42.3)	11.5 (52.7)	16.0 (60.8)	19.2 (66.6)	18.4 (65.1)	12.5 (54.5)	5.3 (41.5)	−3.2 (26.2)	−8.1 (17.4)	4.8 (40.6)
Mean daily minimum °C (°F)	−17.2 (1.0)	−13.5 (7.7)	−8.2 (17.2)	−1.9 (28.6)	3.7 (38.7)	8.6 (47.5)	10.8 (51.4)	10.0 (50.0)	4.3 (39.7)	−2.2 (28.0)	−9.1 (15.6)	−14.3 (6.3)	−2.4 (27.7)
Record low °C (°F)	−47.2 (−53.0)	−48.9 (−56.0)	−40 (−40)	−28.9 (−20.0)	−15.0 (5.0)	−4.4 (24.1)	−0.6 (30.9)	−3.3 (26.1)	−11.7 (10.9)	−30.5 (−22.9)	−34.5 (−30.1)	−45.0 (−49.0)	−48.9 (−56.0)
Average precipitation mm (inches)	13.8 (0.54)	9.9 (0.39)	17.9 (0.70)	25.8 (1.02)	39.6 (1.56)	74.5 (2.93)	37.1 (1.46)	40.2 (1.58)	35.6 (1.40)	17.2 (0.68)	14.9 (0.59)	13.8 (0.54)	340.3 (13.40)
Average rainfall mm (inches)	0.5 (0.02)	0.0 (0.0)	3.2 (0.13)	20.2 (0.80)	33.6 (1.32)	74.5 (2.93)	40.2 (1.58)	59.6 (2.35)	33.5 (1.32)	10.6 (0.42)	2.6 (0.10)	0.1 (0.00)	256.2 (10.09)
Average snowfall cm (inches)	14.0 (5.5)	10.0 (3.9)	16.0 (6.3)	6.0 (2.4)	5.0 (2.0)	0.0 (0.0)	0.0 (0.0)	0.0 (0.0)	2.0 (0.8)	7.0 (2.8)	12.0 (4.7)	14.0 (5.5)	85.0 (33.5)
Source: Environment Canada

== Demographics ==
The population of Jenner according to Alberta Transportation's Basic Municipal Transportation Grant funding program is 15.

== Notable people ==
- Landon Liboiron, actor

== See also ==
- List of communities in Alberta
- List of former urban municipalities in Alberta
- List of hamlets in Alberta
