= Sexsmith, Alberta =

Sexsmith
- Town
- Town of Sexsmith
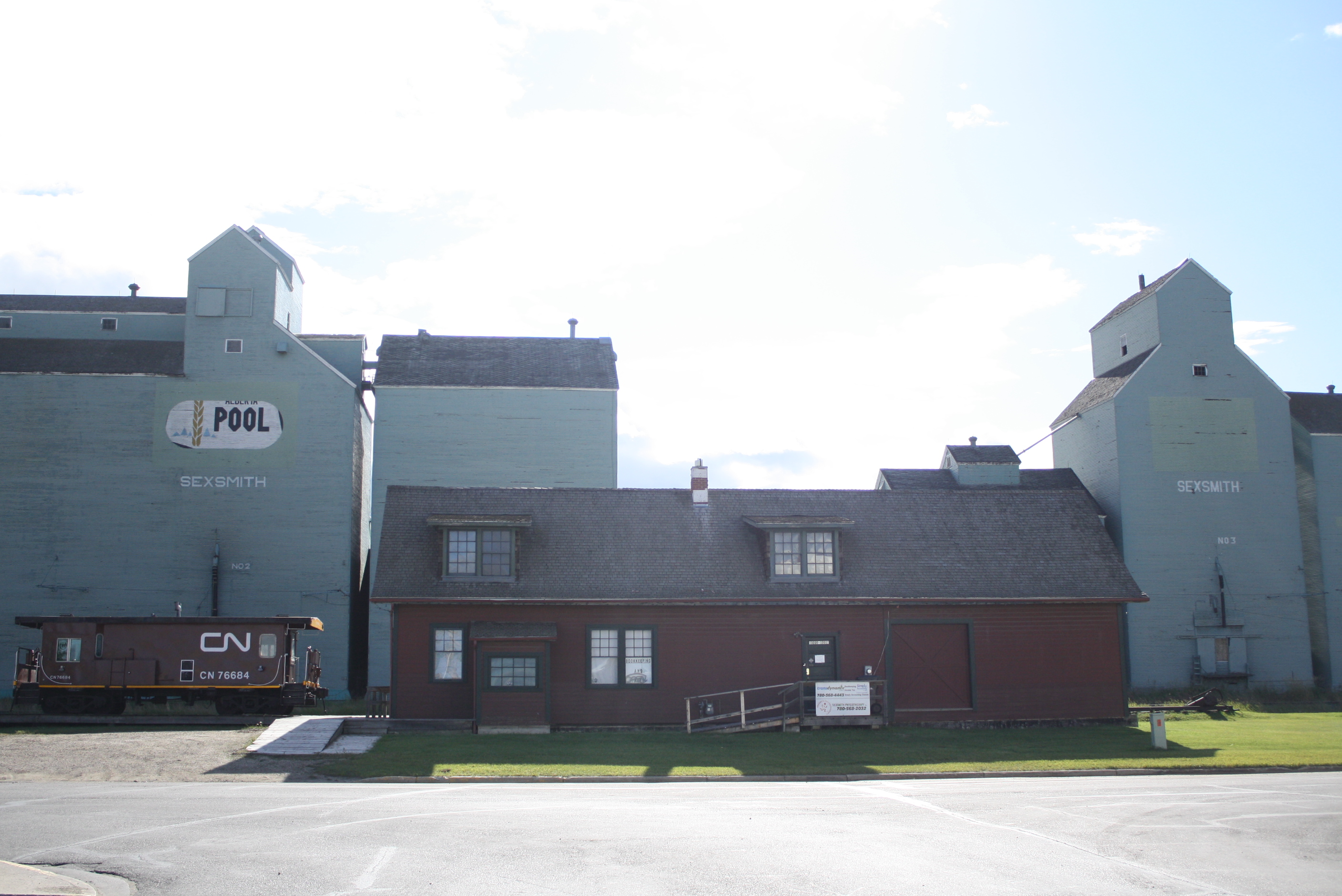
- Train station and two of seven elevators which stood in Sexsmith
- Nickname: Grain Capital of the British Empire
- Location in the County of Grande Prairie No. 1

- Location of Sexsmith in Alberta
- Coordinates: 55°21′3″N 118°46′57″W
- Country: Canada
- Province: Alberta
- Region: Northern Alberta
- Planning region: Upper Peace
- Municipal district: County of Grande Prairie No. 1
- Incorporated
  - Village: April 12, 1929
  - Town: October 15, 1979

Government
  - Mayor: Kate Potter
  - Governing body: Sexsmith Town Council

Area (2021)
  - Land: 13.01 km^{2} (5.02 sq mi)
- Elevation: 724 m (2,375 ft)

Population (2021)
  - Total: 2,427
  - Density: 186.5/km^{2} (483/sq mi)
- Time zone: UTC−06:00 (Alberta Time)
- Postal code span: T0H 3C0
- Area code: 780
- Highways: Highway 2 Highway 59
- Website: sexsmith.ca

Sexsmith is a town in northern Alberta, Canada on Highway 2, 20 kilometres (12 mi) north of Grande Prairie. It is located in the Peace River Country region of Alberta, one of the most fertile growing areas in the province. The town was once known as the "Grain Capital of the British Empire"; in a 10-year period from 1939 to 1949, it shipped more grain than any other port in the empire.

== History ==
The townsite of Sexsmith was established on the homestead of Benny Foster, a 1911 settler, and was originally named "Bennville" or "Benville". However, it was discovered that the name had already used by another town, so it was renamed Sexsmith after a local trapper who came to the area in 1898. The railway arrived in 1916, and grain companies began building grain elevators in 1917. Because of the fertile soil, the area is one of the largest grain producing areas in the world, and by 1949 became the grain capital of the British Empire, shipping more grain than any other region.

== Demographics ==
Federal census population history
| Year | Pop. | ±% |
|---|---|---|
| 1931 | 304 | — |
| 1936 | 298 | −2.0% |
| 1941 | 325 | +9.1% |
| 1946 | 302 | −7.1% |
| 1951 | 331 | +9.6% |
| 1956 | 345 | +4.2% |
| 1961 | 531 | +53.9% |
| 1966 | 491 | −7.5% |
| 1971 | 593 | +20.8% |
| 1976 | 770 | +29.8% |
| 1981 | 1,180 | +53.2% |
| 1986 | 1,256 | +6.4% |
| 1991 | 1,260 | +0.3% |
| 1996 | 1,481 | +17.5% |
| 2001 | 1,653 | +11.6% |
| 2006 | 1,959 | +18.5% |
| 2011 | 2,418 | +23.4% |
| 2016 | 2,620 | +8.4% |
Source: Statistics Canada

In the 2021 Census of Population conducted by Statistics Canada, the town of Sexsmith had a population of 2,427 living in 853 of its 929 total private dwellings, a change of −7.4% from its 2016 population of 2,620. With a land area of 13.01 km^{2} (5.02 sq mi), it had a population density of 186.5/km^{2} (483.2/sq mi) in 2021.

In the 2016 Census of Population conducted by Statistics Canada, Sexsmith recorded a population of 2,620 living in 873 of its 937 total private dwellings, a change of 8.4% from its 2011 population of 2,418. With a land area of 13.24 km^{2} (5.11 sq mi), it had a population density of 197.9/km^{2} (512.5/sq mi) in 2016.

== Economy ==
Ovintiv, with headquarters in Denver, owns an oil and natural gas liquid processing plant with a total capacity of 115,000 barrels per day, from wells drilled into the Montney Formation.

== Sports ==
| Club | League | Sport | Venue | Established | Championships |
|---|---|---|---|---|---|
| Sexsmith Vipers | NWJHL | Ice hockey | Sexsmith Arena | N/A | 0 |
| Sexsmith Skating Club | | Figure skating | Sexsmith Arena | N/A | 0 |
| Sexsmith Shamrocks | Mighty Peace Bantam Football League | Canadian football | Shamrock Football Field | N/A | 0 |

== Education ==
Sexsmith has three schools:

- Robert W. Zahara Public School
- Sexsmith Secondary School
- St. Mary's Catholic School

Sexsmith is also the home of two post-secondary institutions:

- Peace River Bible Institute
- Stan Wallman College

== Notable people ==
- Colin Carter, professor
- Jason Duda, professional ice hockey player in the Central Hockey League
- Garry Edmundson, National Hockey League (NHL) player
- Walter Paszkowski, member of the Alberta legislature
- Carter Rowney, NHL player

== See also ==
- List of communities in Alberta
- List of towns in Alberta
