= List of municipal amalgamations in Alberta =

Municipal amalgamation is one of five forms of municipal restructuring in the Province of Alberta. Under current legislation, the authority to amalgamate two or more municipalities is provided under Division 5 of the Municipal Government Act.

The first amalgamation in Alberta involving one or more urban municipalities occurred on February 1, 1912, when the cities of Strathcona and Edmonton merged to form a single municipal government under the name of the City of Edmonton. The most recent amalgamation occurred on January 1, 2023, when the towns of Turner Valley and Black Diamond merged into the newly created town of Diamond Valley.

== List of urban municipality amalgamations ==
The following is a chronological list of historical municipal amalgamations in Alberta involving at least one or more urban municipalities.

Amalgamating municipalities	Previous statuses	Effective date	Formed municipality	Status of formed municipality	Remarks
Edmonton; Strathcona	City; City	February 1, 1912	Edmonton	City	
Edmonton; North Edmonton	City; Village	July 18, 1912	Edmonton	City	
Edmonton; West Edmonton	City; Village	April 17, 1917	Edmonton	City	
Lloydminster (AB); Lloydminster (SK)	Village (AB); Town (SK)	May 22, 1930	Lloydminster (AB/SK)	Town	Lloydminster subsequently changed to city status on January 1, 1958.
Drinnan; Hinton	Village; New town	April 1, 1957	Hinton	New town	Hinton subsequently changed to town status on December 29, 1958.
Calgary; Forest Lawn	City; Town	December 30, 1961	Calgary	City	
Beverly; Edmonton	Town; City	December 31, 1961	Edmonton	City	
Calgary; Montgomery	City; Village	August 15, 1963	Calgary	City	
Bowness; Calgary	Town; City	August 15, 1964	Calgary	City	
Edmonton; Jasper Place	City; Town	December 17, 1964	Edmonton	City	
Bellevue; Blairmore; Coleman; Frank; Improvement District No. 5	Village; Town; Town; Village; Improvement district	January 1, 1979	Crowsnest Pass	Town	Official legal name of the formed municipality became Municipality of Crowsnest Pass. The town subsequently changed to specialized municipality status on January 16, 2008.
Fort McMurray; Improvement District No. 143	City; Improvement district	April 1, 1995	Wood Buffalo	Specialized municipality	Official legal name of the formed municipality became Municipality of Wood Buffalo, which changed its official legal name to Regional Municipality of Wood Buffalo on August 14, 1996.
Crowsnest Pass; Improvement District No. 6	Town; Improvement district	January 1, 1996	Crowsnest Pass	Town	The town subsequently changed to specialized municipality status on January 16, 2008.
Cold Lake; Grand Centre	Town; Town	October 1, 1996	Cold Lake	Town	Amalgamation included the simultaneous annexation of Medley (CFB Cold Lake/4 Wing) from the Municipal District of Bonnyville No. 87. The amalgamated town subsequently changed to city status on October 1, 2000.
Drumheller; Municipal District of Badlands No. 7	City; Municipal district	January 1, 1998	Drumheller	Town	
Lac La Biche; Lakeland County	Town; Municipal district	August 1, 2007	Lac La Biche County	Municipal district	The municipal district subsequently changed to specialized municipality status on January 1, 2018.
Black Diamond; Turner Valley	Town; Town	January 1, 2023	Diamond Valley	Town	
Caroline; Clearwater	Village; Municipal district	January 1, 2025	Clearwater	Municipal district	

== Amalgamation proposals ==
=== Edmonton, St. Albert and Strathcona County ===
The City of Edmonton applied for a significant annexation in early 1979 that included large portions of Parkland County and Sturgeon County as well as the entireties of City of St. Albert and Strathcona County, which included the unincorporated hamlet of Sherwood Park. The annexation would have effectively amalgamated St. Albert and Strathcona County with Edmonton. Alberta's Local Authorities Board (LAB), a predecessor to the Municipal Government Board, granted the annexation in 1980 but excluded St. Albert, Sherwood Park and lands in Strathcona County to the east of Sherwood Park, thereby preventing any form of amalgamation. The lesser annexation granted by the LAB was subsequently tossed out by Alberta's provincial cabinet.

=== Entwistle and Evansburg ===
The former villages of Entwistle and Evansburg investigated amalgamation in 1986. The two villages subsequently dissolved into hamlets under the jurisdictions of Parkland County and Yellowhead County respectively.

=== Medicine Hat and Redcliff ===
The amalgamation of the Town of Redcliff with the neighbouring City of Medicine Hat was investigated or considered to various degrees in 1962, 1968, 1972, 1979, 1980, and 1985.

=== Spruce Grove and Stony Plain ===
Amalgamation of the towns of Spruce Grove and Stony Plain was investigated in the mid-1980s after Stony Plain had incurred a high debt. Despite a recommendation in favour of amalgamation from Alberta Municipal Affairs, residents of Spruce Grove were not supportive of the amalgamation as it would have resulted in a significant increase in their property taxes.

The City of Spruce Grove initiated a growth study in 2014 in which expansion via amalgamation was to be explored as an alternative to annexation. Potential partners for the amalgamation included the Town of Stony Plain, Parkland County or both.

== See also ==
- 2000–06 municipal reorganization in Quebec
- 2002–2006 municipal reorganization of Montreal
- Amalgamation of the Halifax Regional Municipality
- Amalgamation of Toronto
- Amalgamation of Winnipeg
- Edmonton annexations
- List of communities in Alberta
- List of former municipalities in Quebec
- List of former urban municipalities in Alberta
- List of municipal amalgamations in New Brunswick
- List of municipalities in Alberta
- Manitoba municipal amalgamations, 2015
