= Lobstick (disambiguation) =

A lobstick is a traditional marker found in a boreal forest created by a coniferous tree. Lobstick may also refer to a number of places in Canada:

- Lobstick, Alberta, an unincorporated community in Yellowhead County, Alberta
- Lobstick Lake, a lake in Labrador, Newfoundland and Labrador
- Lobstick River, a river in Yellowhead County, Alberta
- Lobstick Settlement, Alberta, an unincorporated community in Smoky Lake County, Alberta
