= Alberta Highway 16A =

Highway in Alberta

Highway 16A

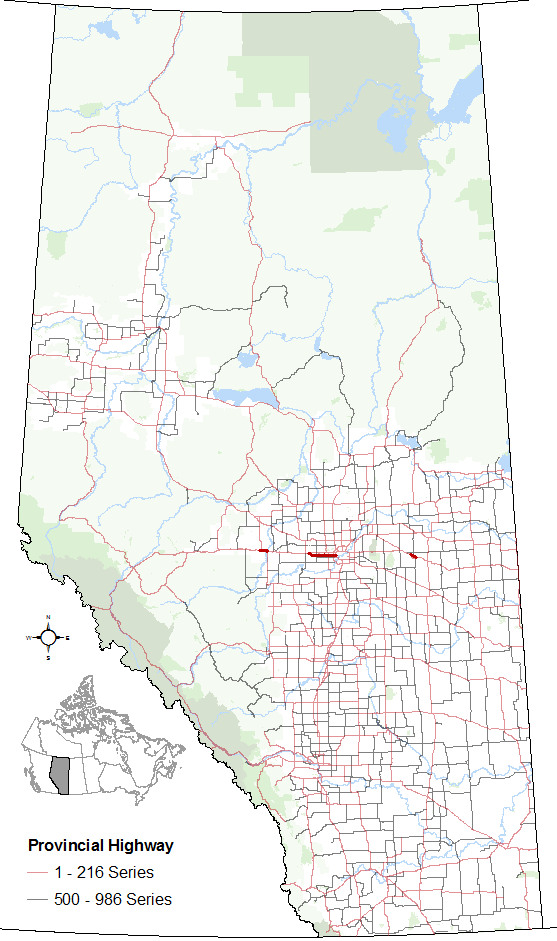
- Segments of Highway 16A in Alberta

Route information
- Auxiliary route of Highway 16
- Maintained by Alberta Transportation

Evansburg – Entwistle segment
- Length: 13.6 km (8.5 mi)
- West end: Highway 16 (TCH) east of Wildwood
- Major intersections: Highway 22 west of Evansburg
- East end: Highway 16 (TCH) / Highway 22 in Entwistle

Parkland Highway
- Length: 34.8 km (21.6 mi)
- West end: Highway 16 (TCH) west of Stony Plain
- Major intersections: Highway 60 at Acheson
- East end: Highway 216 in Edmonton

Vegreville segment
- Length: 9.5 km (5.9 mi)
- West end: Highway 16 (TCH) west of Vegreville
- East end: Highway 16 (TCH) east of Vegreville

Location
- Country: Canada
- Province: Alberta
- Specialized and rural municipalities: Yellowhead County, Parkland County, County of Minburn No. 27
- Major cities: Edmonton, Spruce Grove
- Towns: Stony Plain, Vegreville

Highway system
- Alberta Numbered Highway Network; List; Former
← Highway 16	→ Highway 17

Highway 16A is the designation of three alternate routes off Alberta Highway 16 (the Yellowhead Highway) in Alberta, Canada. The Evansburg – Entwistle section is called 16A:08 by Alberta Transportation, while 16A:24 runs through Vegreville. The section west of Edmonton is labelled 16A:14 and 16A:16 on Alberta Transportation maps, but is better known as Parkland Highway and Stony Plain Road.

== Evansburg – Entwistle ==
Highway 16A:08 parallels Highway 16 to the north, intersecting Highway 22, and passing through Evansburg, Pembina River Provincial Park, and Entwistle.

Evansburg, situated on the north bank of the Pembina River, grew around coal mining, agriculture, and railway operations during the early twentieth century. The community's post office was established in 1914 under the name "Evansburgh," with the final letter dropped in 1950. The Tipple Park Museum, located on the former Pembina Mine site, preserves the town's coal and railway heritage.

The highway crosses the Pembina River through Pembina River Provincial Park, a 167.20-hectare protected area that straddles the Yellowhead County–Parkland County boundary. The park features sandstone gorges reaching 62 metres in height, carved during the last glaciation. Camping, birding, fishing, canoeing, and tubing are the most common activities in the park.

The eastern terminus of Highway 16A:08 is in Entwistle, where the route rejoins Highway 16 and connects with Highway 22 south toward Drayton Valley.

=== Major intersections ===
Starting from the west end of Highway 16A:

Rural/specialized municipality	Location	km	mi	Destinations	Notes
Yellowhead County		0.0	0.0	Highway 16 (TCH/YH) – Edmonton, Jasper	
Yellowhead County		2.7	1.7	Highway 22 – Mayerthorpe	
Yellowhead County	Evansburg	8.5	5.3	UAR 115 south (Range Road 75)	
↑ / ↓		9.5	5.9	Crosses the Pembina River	
Parkland County		9.5– 10.5	5.9– 6.5	Pembina River Provincial Park	
Parkland County	Entwistle	13.6	8.5	Highway 16 (TCH/YH) / Highway 22 north – Edmonton, Jasper Highway 22 south – Drayton Valley	Interchange; Highway 16 exit 289; continues as Highway 22 south
1.000 mi = 1.609 km; 1.000 km = 0.621 mi

== Parkland Highway ==
- Parkland Highway
- Length: 30.5 km (19.0 mi)
- West end: Highway 16 (TCH) near Stony Plain
- East end: 231 Street, Edmonton

Running for 35 km (22 mi), the Parkland Highway (Highway 16A) runs parallel to Highway 16, 3.2 km (2.0 mi) to the north. The highway starts west of Stony Plain near the hamlet of Carvel. Parkland Highway is a central thoroughfare through the bedroom communities of Stony Plain and Spruce Grove. At Acheson it has a partial cloverleaf interchange with Highway 60. Highway 16A enters Edmonton along Stony Plain Road, splits into one-way streets where eastbound traffic follows 100 Avenue, before ending at Anthony Henday Drive (Highway 216).

Highway 16A and the Parkland Highway were established in 1997 when the Highway 16 designation was moved to Highway 16X, a bypass route that becomes Yellowhead Trail in Edmonton.

Stony Plain, through which the western portion of the highway passes, was incorporated as a town on December 10, 1908. The town is known for an extensive collection of outdoor murals depicting its history and heritage. Spruce Grove, the largest city on the Parkland Highway, was first incorporated as a village in 1907, became a town on January 1, 1971, and achieved city status on March 1, 1986. The city's Jennifer Heil Way, which intersects Highway 16A at kilometre 15.7, was named after freestyle skier Jennifer Heil, who won a gold medal in moguls at the 2006 Winter Olympics in Turin and a silver medal at the 2010 Winter Olympics in Vancouver. Near its eastern terminus, Highway 16A passes through the Acheson area of Parkland County. The Acheson Industrial Area spans 10,000 acres (4,000 ha) and hosts more than 200 businesses across transportation, manufacturing, energy services, and value-added agriculture sectors.

=== Major intersections ===
All exits are unnumbered.

Rural/specialized municipality	Location	km	mi	Destinations	Notes
Parkland County		0.0	0.0	Highway 16 (TCH/YH) west to Highway 43 north – Jasper, Grande Prairie	Interchange; Highway 16 exit 344; eastbound entrance and westbound exit
Parkland County		5.4	3.4	Parkland Drive (Township Road 530) – Spring Lake	Former Highway 29
Town of Stony Plain		10.9	6.8	50 Street	Eastbound right-in/right-out
Town of Stony Plain		11.3	7.0	Highway 779 (48 Street)	Partial cloverleaf interchange; Fifth Meridian, 114° Longitude
Town of Stony Plain		12.8	8.0	South Park Drive / North Park Drive	Traffic signals
Town of Stony Plain		14.1	8.8	Boundary Road / Veterans Boulevard	Traffic signals
City of Spruce Grove		15.7	9.8	Jennifer Heil Way / Campsite Road	Traffic signals
City of Spruce Grove		17.3	10.7	Calahoo Road / Golden Spike Road	Traffic signals; former Highway 788
City of Spruce Grove		18.0	11.2	King Street	Traffic signals
City of Spruce Grove		19.0	11.8	Century Road	Traffic signals
Parkland County	Acheson	25.7	16.0	Range Road 264	Right-in/right-out
Parkland County	Acheson	27.3	17.0	Highway 60 (Devonian Way) – Devon	Partial cloverleaf interchange
City of Edmonton		30.5	19.0	231 Street, Range Road 261	Edmonton city limits; becomes Stony Plain Road
City of Edmonton		32.2	20.0	Winterburn Road (215 Street)	Partial cloverleaf interchange
City of Edmonton		33.4	20.8	One-way transition	
City of Edmonton		33.4– 34.8	20.8– 21.6	Anthony Henday Drive (Highway 216)	Cloverstack interchange (Highway 216 exit 21); Highway 16A eastern terminus
City of Edmonton		33.4– 34.8	20.8– 21.6	Stony Plain Road / 100 Avenue – Downtown Edmonton	Eastbound traffic follows 100 Avenue; westbound traffic follows Stony Plain Road
1.000 mi = 1.609 km; 1.000 km = 0.621 mi: Incomplete access

== Vegreville ==
Highway 16A:24 runs through the Town of Vegreville as 50 Avenue.

Vegreville was named after Father Valentin Vegreville, a Roman Catholic Oblate missionary in western Canada. The first settlers arrived in 1894 and the Canadian Northern Railway reached the area in October 1905, spurring the town's early growth. The area around Vegreville constitutes the largest Ukrainian bloc settlement in Alberta, and the town has a long association with Ukrainian cultural traditions. The annual Pysanka Festival, established in 1973, draws thousands of visitors each July with folk arts, traditional dance, and ethnic cuisine.

=== Major intersections ===
Starting from the west end of Highway 16A:

Location	km	mi	Destinations	Notes
County of Minburn No. 27	0.0	0.0	Highway 16 (TCH/YH) west – Edmonton	Interchange; Highway 16 exit 481; eastbound exit and westbound entrance
Vegreville	5.2	3.2	60 Street (Highway 857 north) – Willingdon	West end of Highway 857 concurrency
Vegreville	7.2	4.5	47 Street (Highway 857 south) – Bruce	East end of Highway 857 concurrency
County of Minburn No. 27	9.5	5.9	Highway 16 (TCH/YH) east – Lloydminster	Interchange; Highway 16 exit 492; westbound exit and eastbound entrance
1.000 mi = 1.609 km; 1.000 km = 0.621 mi: Concurrency terminus; Incomplete access

== Former alignments ==
=== Strathcona County ===
Highway 16A
- Location: Strathcona County
- Length: 7.2 km (4.5 mi)
- Existed: 1996

Highway 16A used to follow Baseline Road (101 Avenue), past Refinery Row, and linked with Highway 16 in Strathcona County. It began at the Edmonton city limits, located approximately 1.1 km (0.68 mi) east of the 50 Street intersection, and traveled east for 3.9 km (2.4 mi) to Highway 14X where it turned north for 3.3 km (2.1 mi) and terminated at Highway 16.

In 1996, the province reverted the Baseline Road to Strathcona County while the north–south section became part of Highway 14X. Highway 14X was later renumbered Highway 216 in 1999, and signed as a part of Anthony Henday Drive in 2010.

=== Downtown Edmonton ===
Highway 16A
- Location: Edmonton
- Length: 15.8 km (9.8 mi)
- Existed: 1980s

The Strathcona County segment of Highway 16A used to be part of a larger route which passed through central Edmonton, itself an original alignment of Highway 16. At the time, Highway 16 entered west Edmonton along Stony Plain Road and followed Mayfield Road, and Highway 16A originated at the intersection of Highway 16, Stony Plain Road, Mayfield Road. It travelled east along Stony Plain Road and 102 Avenue through the former town of Jasper Place for 5.3 km (3.3 mi) to 124 Street where it turned south for 150 m (490 ft) and then turned east onto Jasper Avenue for 3.9 km (2.4 mi), passing through Downtown Edmonton. At 95 Street, Highway 16A turned south for 170 m (560 ft) before turning east along Rowland Road for 1.7 km (1.1 mi) and crossing the North Saskatchewan River along the Dawson Bridge. East of 84 Street, Highway 16A followed 106 Avenue for 500 m (1,600 ft) to 79 Street (later using 84 Street), where it traveled south 900 m (3,000 ft) before turning east onto 101 Avenue and leaving Edmonton.

Jasper Place was a separate municipality at the time Highway 16A passed through it. It was annexed by the City of Edmonton on August 17, 1964.

The Dawson Bridge, which carries the Highway 16A route over the North Saskatchewan River, was completed in 1912, making it Edmonton's second river crossing. Originally called the East End Bridge, it was built to serve the Dawson Coal Company mine on the east bank of the river. The bridge is listed on Edmonton's inventory of historic resources.

Highway 16A was phased out in the early 1980s.

== Construction and improvements ==
Alberta Transportation's 2023 provincial construction program included an intersection improvement at Highway 16A and Range Road 20, which was in the design phase at the time of publication. The 2024 program showed the same project continuing in the design phase, with the stated purpose of enhancing public safety at the intersection.
