= Violet Zoie Gardner =

Canadian foster parent (1918–1998)

Violet "Zoie" Gardner
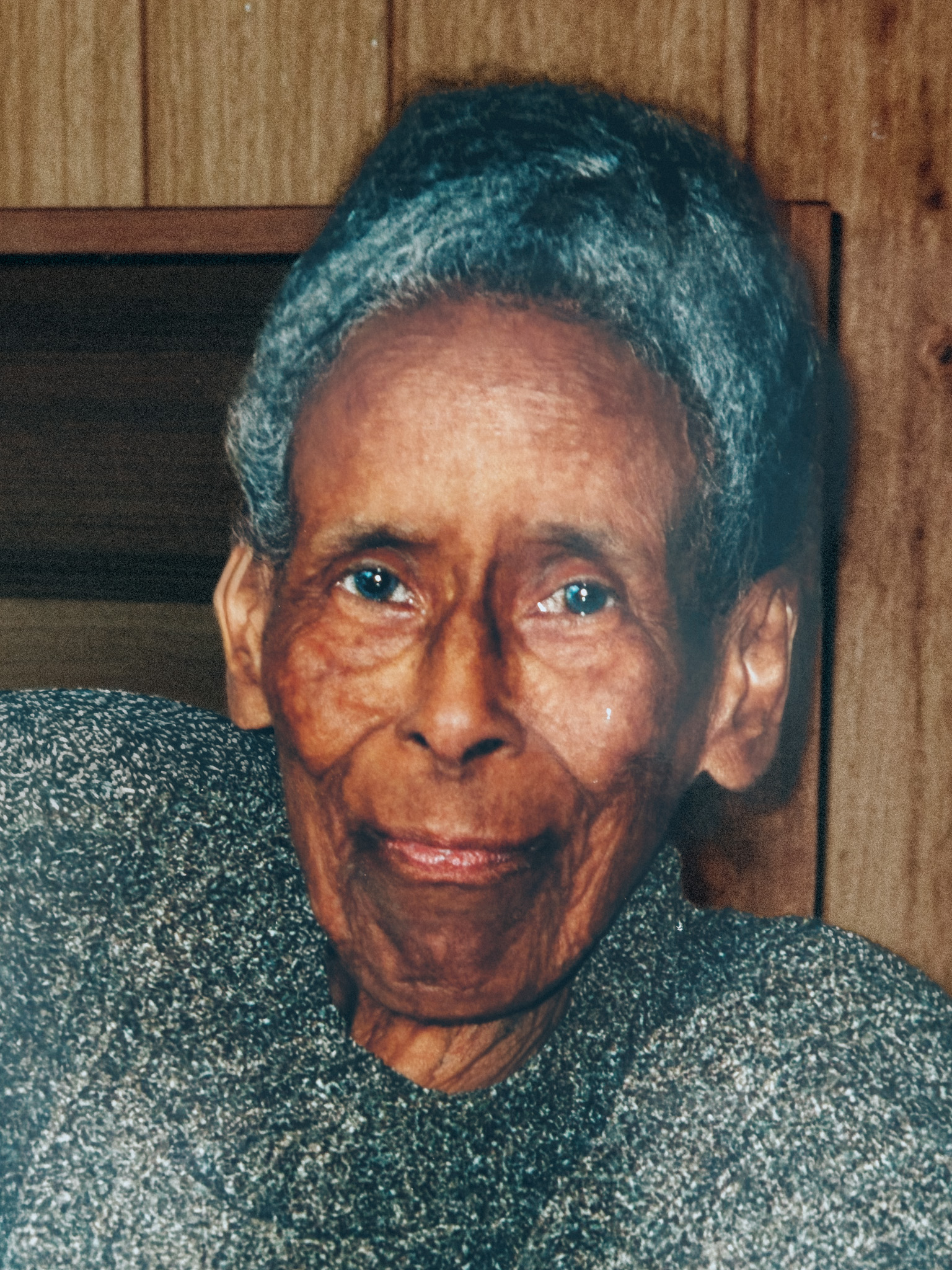
- Gardner on June 18, 1998
- Born: 1918; Manchester, England
- Died: July 10, 1998 (aged 80); Edmonton, Alberta, Canada
- Occupations: Foster parent, caregiver, dressmaker, volunteer
- Awards: Member of the Order of Canada

Violet "Zoie" Gardner (1918 – July 10, 1998), commonly known as Zoie Gardner, was an English-born Canadian foster parent and volunteer in Edmonton, Alberta. Gardner was appointed a Member of the Order of Canada in 1997 and invested in 1998. She was known for decades of care for children and youth with disabilities, unhoused children, children who were difficult to place, and others who found long-term care in her home.

CBC News described Gardner as a local dressmaker, opera lover, and foster mother. Zoie Gardner Park in Edmonton’s Balwin neighbourhood is named in her honour.

== Early life ==
Gardner was born in Manchester, England, in 1918. Her family migrated to Canada when she was about one year old. The family lived in a homestead near Grande Prairie, Alberta, before later moving to Edmonton. She was the eldest of eleven children, left school after Grade 8, and worked as a dressmaker.

== Foster care and caregiving ==
Gardner was recognised for her long-term care of children and youth in Edmonton. She cared for hundreds of children with little financial support from others in a 13-room house in the Calder area of north Edmonton from the mid-1960s. At one point, 24 children reportedly lived under her roof. Her foster children stayed for varied lengths of time, with some staying for almost two decades and others remaining at her home for just a few days.

In a statement in the House of Commons on February 19, 1998, Edmonton North MP Deborah Grey described Gardner as a foster mother to "100 kids" over 60 years. Grey stated that Gardner began caring for a six-day-old infant at age 19, had 10 children in her care by age 21, and at age 79 was still caring for four disabled adults in their thirties and forties. The statement quoted Gardner as saying, "I do not mind growing old, but I sure mind growing useless".

Gardner was closely associated with Edmonton Opera. Her Order of Canada citation refers to her as an opera lover and notes that she introduced children in her care to Edmonton Opera performances. Naming Edmonton describes her as a long-serving volunteer with the Edmonton Opera Society who provided snacks to performers during their rehearsals. The American singer and actor Harry Belafonte reportedly always asked for Gardner when he performed in Edmonton. A later memorial biography by the Unitarian Universalist Community of Victoria states that Gardner loved orchids, classical music, and opera, and that she and members of her household volunteered with the Edmonton Opera Society.

== Death and legacy ==
Gardner died in Edmonton on July 10, 1998 at the age of 80. In 2014, the Unitarian Universalist Community of Victoria established the Zoie Gardner Overseas Fund from a bequest by James “Jim” and Bernice “Bunny” Hackler. The fund supports education for girls and young women in low-income countries. Gardner received several public honours and recognitions for her caregiving work. She was named Outstanding Citizen of 1961 by the Junior Chamber of Commerce. In 1971, marking her 30 years as a foster parent, she was awarded a citation by the Edmonton Foster Parents’ Association.

Gardner was appointed a Member of the Order of Canada on October 23, 1997, and invested on May 7, 1998. The official citation from the Governor General of Canada credits her with caring for Edmonton youth with disabilities for half a century. Her appointment was also recorded in the Canada Gazette on May 16, 1998. A congratulatory letter from Community Development Minister Alvina McClellan to Gardner was tabled in the Legislative Assembly of Alberta as Sessional Paper 39/98 on February 2, 1998.

Zoie Gardner Park is a public park with an area of 0.85 hectares in Edmonton’s Balwin neighbourhood. The park is located at 12710 70 Street and was designated in 1987. In the 2020s, Zoie Gardner Park was included in the City of Edmonton’s Balwin and Belvedere Parks Revitalization project. The planned work at the park included the construction of a new walking trail, basketball court, playground, site furniture, park lighting, landscaping, washroom-building remediation, and a public-art component. The park contains a mural by Heraa Khan called When the Fish Flew. The work was added during the park revitalization and is described as reflecting Gardner, the playfulness of the park, and the diversity of the surrounding neighbourhood.
