= Obadiah Place =

Nitin lakhwani

Obadiah Place is a historic site in Amber Valley, Alberta. It was the homestead of Willis Reese Bowen and later the home of his son Obadiah Bowen, a pastor for the town.

Willis (sometimes spelled Willace) Reese Bowen brought his family and four other black Oklahoman families to the Amber Valley in 1911. They had applied for homesteads under Clifford Sifton's immigration campaign to bring new settlers to the Canadian Prairies. Sifton had not anticipated that African Americans would migrate to Canada. Most immigrants were of European ancestry, from Britain, the United States and Europe, including Ukraine and Russia.

Sifton later sent immigration officers to the US South to try to dissuade black farmers from emigrating to Canada. He and the Department of Immigration also implemented racist policies that created barriers to such immigration, while not explicitly prohibiting entry of people of African descent. These policies were not overturned until 1962. Violet King Henry, whose family was among the first settlers with the Bowens, was the first Black Canadian women to earn a law degree, and helped to develop more progressive policies.

== Description ==
Obadiah Place is a wooden 1 1/2-storey square house, located on a 1.21-hectare (3.0-acre) parcel of land on the Obadiah Bowen farm. It has four farm outbuildings and a phone booth. It is the oldest surviving house in the community. The house's vernacular wood construction is now rare in Canada.

The site also includes a picnic area, park space and a baseball diamond that honours the early 20th-century Amber Valley Baseball Team.

Willis Bowen homesteaded on the site in 1913. He built a log cabin that served as a community centre, post office, and site of the first telephone for the community. In 1938, his son Obadiah Bowen built the existing house, to replace the log cabin. After Obadiah Bowen left the property, the Friends of Obadiah Place Society and the Alberta Historical Resources Foundation purchased the property to protect and preserve this important historic site.

== See also ==
- List of historic places in Northern Alberta
