= Staffordville, Lethbridge =

Staffordville Stafford
- Neighbourhood
- Location of Stafford in Alberta
- Coordinates: 49.715°N 112.837°W
- Country: Canada
- Province: Alberta
- City: Lethbridge
- Quadrant: NW
- Incorporated: 1900 (village)
- Annexed: 1913

Government
  - Administrative body: Lethbridge City Council

Population (2012)
  - Total: 967

Staffordville, also originally known as Stafford, is a residential neighbourhood in Lethbridge, Alberta, Canada that held village status between 1900 and 1913.

== History ==
Staffordville was founded in the 1890s as a coal mining community. It was named after William Stafford, mining engineer for the North Western Coal and Navigation Company. The Village of Stafford was incorporated on October 22, 1900. It was annexed by the City of Lethbridge in 1913.

== Geography ==
Staffordville is west of Stafford Drive North and north of 9 Avenue North in northern Lethbridge. The neighbourhoods of Senator Buchanan, St. Edwards, and Stafford Manor are to the south, east, and north respectively.

== Demographics ==
Federal census population history of Stafford
Year	Pop.	±%
1906	623	—
1911	985	+58.1%
Source: Statistics Canada

Staffordville has a population of 967 living in 450 dwellings in the City of Lethbridge's 2012 municipal census.

== See also ==
- List of former urban municipalities in Alberta
- List of neighbourhoods in Lethbridge
