= List of historic places in Northern Alberta =

The following historic places in Northern Alberta are entered on the Canadian Register of Historic Places, whether they are federal, provincial, or municipal:

Name	Address	Coordinates	Government recognition (CRHP №)	Wikidata ID	Image
St. Paul's Anglican Church and Heritage House	32 - 2 Avenue NE; McLennan AB	55°42′39″N 116°54′07″W	McLennan municipality (2835)	Q42331886	Upload Photo
Nativity of the Blessed Virgin Roman Catholic Church	273 Mackenzie Ave. Fort Chipewyan AB	58°42′41″N 111°10′23″W	Alberta (5915)	Q38529108	Upload Photo
Ecology and Weeds Building	Beaverlodge Research Station; Beaverlodge AB	55°11′59″N 119°23′48″W	Federal (9814)	Q41282436	Upload Photo
Reverend Forbes Homestead	10424 - 96 Street; Grande Prairie AB	55°10′34″N 118°46′59″W	Alberta (3050)	Q38529966	More images
Ronning Homestead	Grande Prairie County No. 1 AB	55°21′31″N 119°24′32″W	Alberta (3192)		
Bitumount Site	near Fort McMurray; Wood Buffalo Regional Municipality AB	57°23′11″N 111°38′46″W	Alberta (4998)		More images
Grande Prairie High School	10209 - 99 Street; Grande Prairie AB	55°10′23″N 118°47′28″W	Alberta (5000)		
Cochrane Farm	RR 1 Grande Prairie County No. 1 AB	55°14′07″N 118°38′20″W	Alberta (5003)	Q37777615	Upload Photo
Athabasca United Church	4817 - 48 Street; Athabasca AB	54°43′08″N 113°16′59″W	Alberta (5178)		More images
Canadian Northern Railway Station	5101 - 50 Avenue; Athabasca AB	54°43′17″N 113°17′14″W	Alberta (19043)	Q37777457	Upload Photo
Melsness Mercantile Building	Valhalla Centre; Grande Prairie County No. 1 AB	55°24′13″N 119°22′59″W	Alberta (5185)	Q38528855	Upload Photo
Monkman Homestead	near Cutbank Lake; Grande Prairie County No. 1 AB	55°15′28″N 119°07′55″W	Alberta (5186)	Q38529053	Upload Photo
Hudson's Bay Company Factor's House	Fort Vermilion; Mackenzie County AB	58°23′48″N 116°00′07″W	Alberta (5723)		
Obadiah Place	Amber Valley; Athabasca County AB	54°43′26″N 112°55′44″W	Alberta (5914)	Q38529302	Upload Photo
Sexsmith Blacksmith Shop	Sexsmith AB	55°20′59″N 118°47′01″W	Alberta (6562)		
Northern Alberta Railway Station	Main Street and Railway Avenue; Sexsmith AB	55°20′58″N 118°47′10″W	Alberta (6852)		
Fort Dunvegan National Historic Site of Canada	west of Dunvegan; Fairview Municipal District No. 136 AB	55°55′25″N 118°36′14″W	Federal (18983), Alberta (8769)		
Plavin Homestead	near North Star; Northern Lights County AB	56°50′23″N 117°36′58″W	Alberta (8991)		Upload Photo
1880 Anglican Church of St. Paul the Apostle and the 1874 Day School	Fort Chipewyan; Wood Buffalo Regional Municipality AB	58°42′33″N 111°06′58″W	Alberta (9088)		Upload Photo
St. Bernard Mission (Church and Cemetery)	Grouard; Big Lakes County AB	55°32′41″N 116°09′29″W	Alberta (9089)		Upload Photo
McNaught Homestead	south of Beaverlodge; Grande Prairie County No. 1 AB	55°09′07″N 119°26′13″W	Alberta (9090)		Upload Photo
Beaver River Quarry Archaeological Site	Near Fort MacKay; Wood Buffalo Regional Municipality AB		Alberta (10935)		Upload Photo
Quarry of the Ancestors	6 miles northeast of Fort MacKay; Wood Buffalo Regional Municipality AB	57°11′53″N 111°31′56″W	Alberta (18869)		Upload Photo
Notre Dame des Victoires / Lac La Biche Mission National Historic Site of Canada	northwest of Lac La Biche; Lac La Biche County AB	54°49′22″N 112°05′38″W	Federal (15064, (21497), Alberta (11122)		More images
Peace River N.A.R. Station	9409 - 100 Street; Peace River AB	56°14′22″N 117°17′35″W	Alberta (11390)	Q38529616	More images
Trapper's Shack	5003 River Road, Fort Vermilion; Mackenzie County AB	58°14′03″N 116°00′36″W	Mackenzie County municipality (11482)		Upload Photo
Eaglenest Portage Site	Near Fort MacKay; Wood Buffalo Regional Municipality AB		Alberta (11517)		Upload Photo
St. Augustine's Roman Catholic Mission	Shaftesbury Settlement; Peace Municipal District No. 135 AB	56°09′18″N 117°26′42″W	Alberta (11611)	Q38530383	More images
Bad Heart Straw Church	Teepee Creek; Grande Prairie County No. 1 AB	55°29′06″N 118°17′17″W	Alberta (11819)		Upload Photo
Battle River Hospital	300 Main Street; Manning AB	56°55′22″N 117°37′52″W	Alberta (11821)		Upload Photo
Fort Chipewyan III	Fort Chipewyan; Wood Buffalo Regional Municipality AB	58°42′44″N 111°08′56″W	Federal (17705), Alberta (11935)	Q18534258	More images
Fort Vermilion National Historic Site of Canada	Southeast corner of River Road and 45th Street, Fort Vermilion; Mackenzie County AB	58°23′02″N 116°02′24″W	Federal (16741)		More images
Fort Fork National Historic Site of Canada	River Lot 19, Shaftesbury Settlement; Peace Municipal District No. 135 AB	56°08′11″N 117°28′01″W	Federal (17661)	Q5471152	More images
Frog Lake National Historic Site of Canada	South of Frog Lake; Frog Lake AB	53°49′52″N 110°21′31″W	Federal (18201)		
All Saints Anglican Church	Alberta Highway 717, Cherry Point; Clear Hills County AB	56°11′18″N 119°56′20″W	Clear Hills County municipality (17901)	Q33212259	Upload Photo

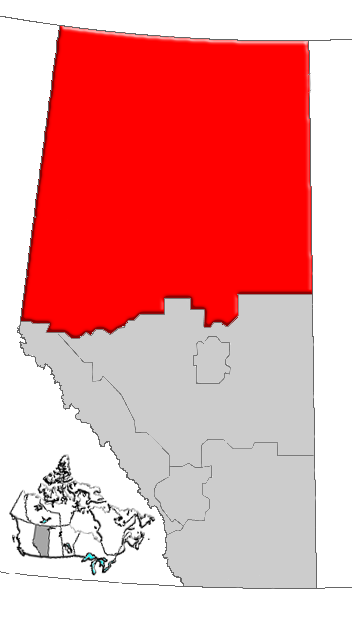
