= Lobstick =

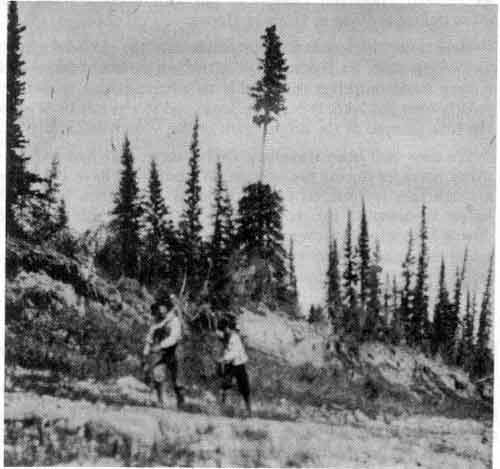
Indian tracking past lobstick near the Hayes River Canada, taken circa 1910.

Lobsticks are traditional markers found in the Boreal Forests of Canada created by removing the middle (or lower) branches of a coniferous (pine) tree.

== Usage ==
The lobstick was created by cutting off most of the lower branches of tall pine or spruce trees. The remaining tuft on the top would make the tree conspicuous from a distance. Occasionally other trees surrounding the lobstick would be cut down to further improve its visibility.

In some instances, the bark was removed and names were carved on the wood. The usages could be both practical and symbolic. Lobsticks would mark trails or portages, sources of food, or hunting grounds. They were also used as cultural markers, to signify meeting places, burial grounds, ceremonial sites, personal totems or to honour someone. Lobsticks could also be known as "lopsticks" or maypoles. Explorer Warburton Pike wrote in the 1800s: "In giving directions to a stranger it is hopeless to describe the points and bends of a monotonous river highway, but a lop-stick does the duty of a signpost and at once settles the question of locality."

== History ==
First Nations communities used lobsticks since pre-history to mark trails and hunting grounds. The practice was later adopted by the first Europeans who travelled through northern Canada. Explorer Alexander Mackenzie found lobsticks on his travels and wrote that they "denoted the immediate abode of the natives". In 1790, voyageur Peter Pangman created a lobstick at Rocky Mountain House to mark the furthest extent of discovery along the Saskatchewan River. In the 1820s fur trader Alexander Ross found a lobstick marking the mouth of the Berens River.

== Place names ==
Many places across Canada are named after the lobsticks that once stood there. They include:

- Lobstick (town), Alberta
- Lobstick Bay, Ontario
- Lobstick Bay, Manitoba
- Lobstick Creek, Manitoba
- Lobstick Creek, Alberta
- Lobstick Creek, Northwest Territories
- Lobstick Island, Ontario
- Lobstick Island, Saskatchewan
- Lobstick Island, Alberta
- Lobstick Island, British Columbia
- Lobstick Island, Northwest Territories
- Lobstick Lake, Newfoundland and Labrador
- Lobstick Lake, Saskatchewan Lake
- Lobstick Narrows, Manitoba
- Lobstick Point, Saskatchewan
- Lobstick River, Alberta
- Lobstick Settlement, Alberta
- Maypole Island, Reindeer Lake
