= Obadiah Bowen =

American settler from Canada

Obadiah Bowen (born May 16, 1907, Lincoln County, Oklahoma, US; d. Apr. 7, 2004, Athabasca, Alberta, Canada) was one of the original settlers to Amber Valley, Alberta, as well as a pastor and community leader. He was one of the first Black settlers to Alberta.

== Homesteading ==
Obadiah Bowen came to Canada from Oklahoma in 1909 with his parents Willis Reese Bowen and Jeanie Gregory Bowen and several siblings, as well as four other families his father helped organize.

Bowen's father homesteaded Obadiah Place (Bowen Residence) in 1913. His original log cabin was a community meeting place, post office, and site of the first telephone. In 1938, his son Obadiah Bowen replaced the cabin, building a house. It was recognized as an Alberta historic site in 1999.

== Civic leadership ==
Bowen served as the town preacher for people of various denominations. His interdenominational church was built on land he donated in 1953, about a half mile from the house.

== Work ==
Bowen also worked in construction at the Banff Springs Hotel and built roads and railways, and worked as a freighter.

== Family ==
Bowen married Eva Mae Mapp Bowen and had four children, including Oliver Bowen. In 1996, he moved from Amber Valley to an Athabasca nursing home.
