= North Red Deer, Alberta =

North Red Deer
- Former village
- Location of North Red Deer North Red Deer (Alberta)
- Coordinates: 52°16′48″N 113°49′23″W
- Country: Canada
- Province: Alberta
- Region: Central Alberta
- Census division: No. 8
- City: Red Deer County
- Founded: 1894
- Incorporated (village): February 17, 1911
- Amalgamated: January 1, 1948
- Time zone: UTC-7 (MST)
  - Summer (DST): UTC-6 (MDT)
- Area codes: 403 / 587
- Waterways: Red Deer River

North Red Deer is a former village in central Alberta, Canada within the City of Red Deer.

The village was on the north shore of the Red Deer River along the Calgary and Edmonton (C&E) Railway, which was later acquired by the Canadian Pacific Railway. The former village is located within Red Deer's Riverside Meadows neighbourhood, with portions also being located within the neighbourhoods of Highland Green and Oriole Park.

== History ==
North Red Deer was established as a hamlet in 1894 upon completion of the C&E rail line, including the bridge over the Red Deer River. It incorporated as the Village of North Red Deer on February 17, 1911, with the ministerial order being signed on June 18, 1911. Walter Webb became the village's first mayor on March 13, 1911.

After a previously unratified attempt in 1946, the Village of North Red Deer amalgamated with the City of Red Deer on January 1, 1948. The last village council meeting occurred on December 24, 1947.

In 1999, the City of Red Deer renamed the area of the former village to Riverside Meadows. In 2000, the city adopted the Riverside Meadows Area Redevelopment Plan (ARP), which was replaced by a new ARP in 2009. The City of Red Deer celebrated the centennial of the Village of North Red Deer on August 27, 2011.

== Demographics ==
Population history of North Red Deer
Year	Pop.	±%
1911	304	—
1916	354	+16.4%
1921	325	−8.2%
1926	293	−9.8%
1931	318	+8.5%
1936	359	+12.9%
1941	524	+46.0%
1946	698	+33.2%
Source: Statistics Canada

Over the course of its incorporation, North Red Deer grew from a population of 304 in 1911 to a population of 698 in 1946.

== See also ==
- List of communities in Alberta
- List of former urban municipalities in Alberta
