= North Edmonton, Alberta =

North Edmonton
- (former village)
- Village of North Edmonton
- Location of North Edmonton in Edmonton
- Coordinates: 53°35′0″N 113°26′0″W
- Country: Canada
- Province: Alberta
- City: Edmonton
- Village: January 20, 1910
- Annexation: July 22, 1912

Government
  - Mayor: Andrew Knack
  - Administrative body: Edmonton City Council
  - Councillor: Ashley Salvador

North Edmonton is a former village in Alberta, Canada, that was absorbed by the City of Edmonton. The approximate geographic centre of the former village is the intersection of Fort Road, 66 Street and 127 Avenue in northeast Edmonton. Its land is now occupied by the Edmonton neighbourhoods of Balwin, Belvedere, Industrial Heights, Kennedale Industrial and Yellowhead Corridor East.

== History ==
Development here grew up after the arrival of the Canadian Northern Railway in Edmonton in 1905. It was commonly known as Packingtown, due to the large number of meatpacking plants that grew up in the area, especially along 66th Street. It became the home of a Franciscan friary, built on land acquired by Bishop Émile-Joseph Legal. The facility continued its operation until 2005.

The Village of North Edmonton was incorporated on January 20, 1910, encompassing four quarter sections of land. It had a population of 404 in 1911.

The village was annexed by Edmonton on July 22, 1912.

== See also ==
- List of former urban municipalities in Alberta
