= List of former urban municipalities in Alberta =

The Province of Alberta currently has 253 urban municipalities including 19 cities, 105 towns, 78 villages and 51 summer villages. In addition, there are 106 communities that previously held some form of urban municipality status. These include 2 former cities, 16 former towns, 2 former new towns, 85 former villages, and 1 former summer village. These communities no longer exist as independent urban municipalities due to amalgamation, annexation or dissolution.

== List ==
Former urban municipality	Former status	Original name	Dissolution date
Albert Park	Village		August 1, 1935
Alderson	Village	Carlstadt	January 31, 1936
Bellevue	Village		January 1, 1979
Bellis	Village		January 1, 1946
Beverly	Town		December 30, 1961
Black Diamond	Town		January 1, 2023
Blackie	Village		August 31, 1997
Blairmore	Town		January 1, 1979
Botha	Village		September 1, 2017
Bow City	Village		April 17, 1918
Bowness	Town		August 15, 1964
Burdett	Village		January 1, 2003
Cadogan	Village		January 1, 1946
Caroline	Village		January 1, 2025
Cayley	Village		June 1, 1996
Cereal	Village		January 1, 2021
Chinook	Village		April 1, 1977
Clairmont	Village		January 1, 1946
Cluny	Village		September 15, 1995
Coleman	Town		January 1, 1979
Commerce	Village	Coalgate	May 13, 1926
Compeer	Village		December 31, 1936
Craigmyle	Village		January 1, 1972
Crescent Heights	Village		January 1, 1911
Cynthia	New town		May 1, 1959
Derwent	Village		September 1, 2010
Dewberry	Village		January 1, 2021
Diamond City	Town		June 30, 1937
Drinnan	Village		April 1, 1957
Dunmore	Village		February 4, 1919
Eaglesham	Village		December 31, 1996
East Calgary	Village		July 17, 1919
Enchant	Village		February 1, 1945
Entwistle	Village		December 31, 2000
Erskine	Village		May 10, 1946
Evansburg	Village		June 30, 1998
Evarts	Village		May 27, 1916
Ferintosh	Village		January 1, 2020
Forest Lawn	Town		December 30, 1961
Fort Assiniboine	Village		December 31, 1991
Fort McMurray	City	McMurray	April 1, 1995
Frank	Village		January 1, 1979
Gadsby	Village		February 1, 2020
Galahad	Village		January 1, 2016
Gleichen	Town		March 31, 1998
Grande Cache	Town		January 1, 2019
Grand Centre	Town		October 1, 1996
Granum	Town		February 1, 2020
Grassy Lake	Village		July 1, 1996
Grouard	Village		January 15, 1944
Hairy Hill	Village		December 31, 1996
Halkirk	Village		January 1, 2025
Hythe	Village		July 1, 2021
Irvine	Town		December 31, 1996
Islay	Village		March 15, 1944
Jasper Place	Town	West Jasper Place	August 17, 1964
Jenner	Village		June 25, 1943
Kinuso	Village		September 1, 2009
Lac La Biche	Town		August 1, 2007
Langdon	Village		January 1, 1946
Lavoy	Village		April 30, 1999
Lille	Village		1919
Lodgepole	New town		March 1, 1970
Lundbreck	Village		April 30, 1906
Minburn	Village		July 1, 2015
Mirror	Village		January 1, 2004
Monarch	Village		December 31, 1938
Monitor	Village		January 1, 1946
Montgomery	Town		August 15, 1963
Mountain View	Village		September 9, 1915
New Norway	Village		November 1, 2012
New Sarepta	Village		September 1, 2010
Newcastle	Village		May 21, 1931
North Edmonton	Village		July 22, 1912
North Red Deer	Village		December 31, 1947
Ohaton	Village		January 1, 1946
Pincher City	Village		May 3, 1932
Plamondon	Village		May 1, 2002
Port Cornwall	Village		September 11, 1917
Radway	Village		December 31, 1996
Ranfurly	Village		January 1, 1946
Retlaw	Village		March 1, 1939
Richdale	Village		June 2, 1931
Riverside	Village		January 1, 1911
Rosebud	Village		January 1, 1946
Rouleauville	Village		March 15, 1907
Rumsey	Village		April 1, 1995
Sangudo	Village		September 16, 2007
Stafford	Village		January 1, 1913
Strathcona	City	South Edmonton	February 1, 1912
Strome	Village		January 1, 2016
Suffield	Village		January 1, 1930
Swalwell	Village		January 1, 1946
Thorhild	Village		April 1, 2009
Tilley	Village		August 31, 2013
Tollerton	Village		1918
Torrington	Village		December 31, 1997
Turner Valley	Town		January 1, 2023
Wabamun	Village		January 1, 2021
Walsh	Village		May 4, 1925
Wanham	Village		December 31, 1999
Warspite	Village		June 1, 2000
West Edmonton	Village	Calder	April 5, 1917
White Gull	Summer village		January 1, 2003
Wildwood	Village		December 31, 1990
Willingdon	Village		September 1, 2017

== See also ==
- 2000–06 municipal reorganization in Quebec
- 2002–2006 municipal reorganization of Montreal
- Amalgamation of the Halifax Regional Municipality
- Amalgamation of Toronto
- Amalgamation of Winnipeg
- Edmonton annexations
- List of communities in Alberta
- List of municipal amalgamations in Alberta
- List of municipal amalgamations in New Brunswick
- List of municipalities in Alberta
- Manitoba municipal amalgamations, 2015
