= Amber Valley, Alberta =

Amber Valley
- Unincorporated
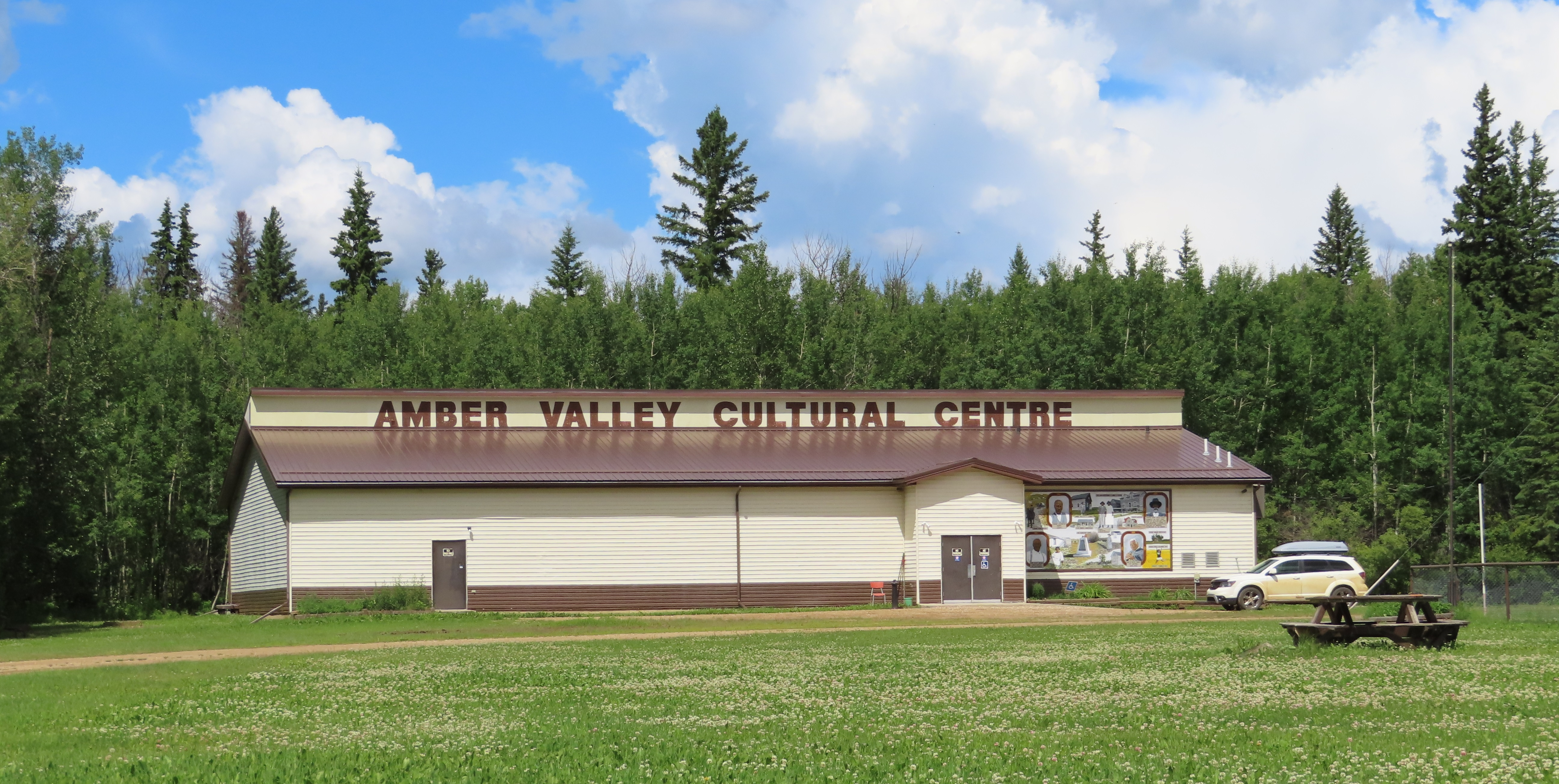
- Amber Valley Cultural Centre

- Location of Amber Valley in Alberta
- Coordinates: 54°43′58″N 112°55′46″W
- Country: Canada
- Province: Alberta
- Region: Northern Alberta
- Census division: 13
- Municipal district: Athabasca County

Government
  - Reeve: Doris Splane
  - Governing body: Athabasca County Council: Larry Armfelt; Christine Bilsky; Warren Griffin; Kevin Haines; Travais Johnson; Dwayne Rawson; Doris Splane; Penny Stewart; Denis Willcott
- Time zone: UTC-7 (MST)
  - Summer (DST): UTC-6 (MDT)

Amber Valley is an unincorporated community in northern Alberta, Canada, approximately 160 kilometres (99 mi) north of Edmonton. Its elevation is 608 m (1,995 ft). Originally named Pine Creek, Amber Valley was among several Alberta communities settled in the early 20th century by early Black immigrants to the province from Oklahoma and the Deep South of the United States. About 1,000 African Americans emigrated to Alberta from 1909 to 1911. Amber Valley is the location of the Obadiah Place provincial heritage site, a homestead of one of the first African-American settler families.

== History ==
In 1905 - 1912 African-American homesteaders established the community. The homesteaders, African Americans from Oklahoma and Texas, were attracted by the government's promises of land to homestead, as it was trying to encourage immigrant settlers to develop the land. They were leaving Jim Crow conditions in the United States that discriminated against their rights.

Henry Parson Sneed, a clergyman and mason, led a group of settlers from Oklahoma to an area by the Athabasca River. For the first few years they had difficulties, as the climate was harsher than what they were used to in Oklahoma. They had both to clear and cultivate land for crops, and build their houses from the ground up. Most of the early ones were log cabins. The settlers were resilient and three quarters of the African Americans stayed on their land in Alberta long enough and developed it in order to secure their homestead patents, a higher percentage than of some other settlers groups. They built a school house in 1913 and a nondenominational church in 1914. J.D. Edwards who was one of the original homesteaders founded and managed a baseball team that was widely known in the north.

Amber Valley was the largest community of Black people in Alberta until the 1930s. It received a post office in 1931, when it officially established the name of the community. At that time the community had about 300 people, and supported a two-room schoolhouse. Because of a decline in population as people moved to cities and areas with more economic opportunity, the post office was closed in 1968.

Other primarily American Black settlements formed at this time were Junkins (now Wildwood), near Chip Lake; Keystone (now Breton), southwest of Edmonton; Campsie, near Barrhead; and Eldon, near Maidstone, Saskatchewan. From 1908 to 1911, about 1,000 African Americans settled in Alberta to homestead.

Beginning in the 1950s, many descendants of the original settlers began moving to near cities such as Edmonton to escape the rigours of rural life and have more economic opportunity. In Edmonton, Amber Valley descendants founded the Shiloh Baptist Church, one of the few Black churches in Western Canada.

Amber Valley is now considered a ghost town.

== Original settlers ==
Parson Henry Sneed was one of the first to settle in Amber Valley. With Jordon Murphy and Nimrod Toles, he arrived in 1905. On a train from Oklahoma he met Jefferson Davis Edwards in 1910, who married Martha Murphy. Initially the young couple lived with Martha's father, Jordan Murphy. Martha was the first woman to live in Amber Valley, and her son, Romeo, was the first child born there. Willace Bowen established a homestead that his son Obadiah Bowen continued to work. Obadiah replaced the first house with a brick one in 1938. The house and homestead, with outbuildings, has been preserved as Obadiah Place and honoured for its historic provincial significance.

- John King and Stella King, parents of Violet King Henry, the first Canadian Black female attorney
- Willace Bowen, also recorded as Willis Reese Bowen
- Henry Parson Sneed
- Hazel Proctor
- J.D. Edwards

== Notable people ==
- Oliver Bowen, grandson of Willace Bowen and engineer
- Cheryl Foggo, author, documentary film director, playwright
- Violet King Henry, descendant of settlers and the first Canadian Black female attorney
- Floyd Sneed (drummer for the 1960s -'70s pop music band Three Dog Night), descendant born in Calgary, related to Harrison Sneed
- Judi Singh, South Asian-Black Jazz singer

== Popular interest ==
- The community was the subject of the 1984 documentary film We Remember Amber Valley, directed by Selwyn Jacob.
- Esi Edugyan's debut novel, The Second Life of Samuel Tyne (2004), is set in the fictional town of Aster, based on this historic settlement. It features a Ghanaian-Canadian civil servant from Calgary who moves his family there in 1968 after inheriting property.
- In 2021, the community was honoured with a Canada Post stamp.
- One of the silver coins in the Royal Canadian Mint's Commemorating Black History series was designed in honour of Amber Valley's original Black settlers. The coin was issued in connection with Black History Month 2024.
