= Grand Centre =

Grand Centre Cold Lake South
- Former town
- Location of Grand Centre (Cold Lake South) in Alberta
- Coordinates: 54°24′48″N 110°12′41″W
- Country: Canada
- Province: Alberta
- Region: Central Alberta
- Census division: 12
- City: Cold Lake
- Incorporated
  - Village: January 1, 1957
  - Town: April 1, 1958
- Amalgamated: October 1, 1996

Government
  - MP: David Yurdiga
  - MLA: Scott Cyr
- Elevation: 541 m (1,775 ft)

Population (2016)
  - Total: 6,148
- Time zone: UTC−06:00 (Alberta Time)
- Postal code span: T9M
- Area codes: +1-780, +1-587
- Highways: Highway 28

Grand Centre, now known as Cold Lake South, is a former town in Alberta, Canada, that originally incorporated in 1957. Nearly 40 years later, it merged with nearby Cold Lake to the north and Medley to the west, a community on CFB Cold Lake, to form a new municipality named Cold Lake in 1996. It has an elevation of 541 m (1,775 ft).

== History ==
The community incorporated as the Village of Grand Centre on January 1, 1957. Sixteen months later, it incorporated as the Town of Grand Centre on April 1, 1958. Grand Centre then amalgamated with the nearby former Town of Cold Lake to the north to form a new town named Cold Lake on October 1, 1996. The amalgamation also included the absorption of the adjacent community of Medley to the west on CFB Cold Lake by way of a concurrent annexation. The amalgamated Cold Lake subsequently incorporated as a city on October 1, 2000. Within the City of Cold Lake, Grand Centre is now referred to as Cold Lake South while the former Town of Cold Lake is referred to Cold Lake North.

== Demographics ==
Federal census population history of Grand Centre/ Cold Lake South
Year	Pop.	±%
1956	1,008	—
1961	1,493	+48.1%
1966	1,731	+15.9%
1971	2,088	+20.6%
1976	2,780	+33.1%
1981	3,146	+13.2%
1986	3,655	+16.2%
1991	3,877	+6.1%
1996	4,176	+7.7%
2001	4,189	+0.3%
2006	4,831	+15.3%
2011	5,416	+12.1%
2016	6,148	+13.5%
Source: Statistics Canada Note: The 2001 through 2016 population counts are of the former Town of Grand Centre that amalgamated with the Town of Cold Lake and Medley (CFB 4 Wing) on October 1, 1996.

Just prior to amalgamation, the Town of Grand Centre recorded a population of 4,176 in the 1996 census. Over the next 20 years, Cold Lake South grew to a population of 6,148 according to the 2016 census.

== See also ==
- List of former urban municipalities in Alberta
