= Wildwood, Alberta =

Wildwood
- Hamlet
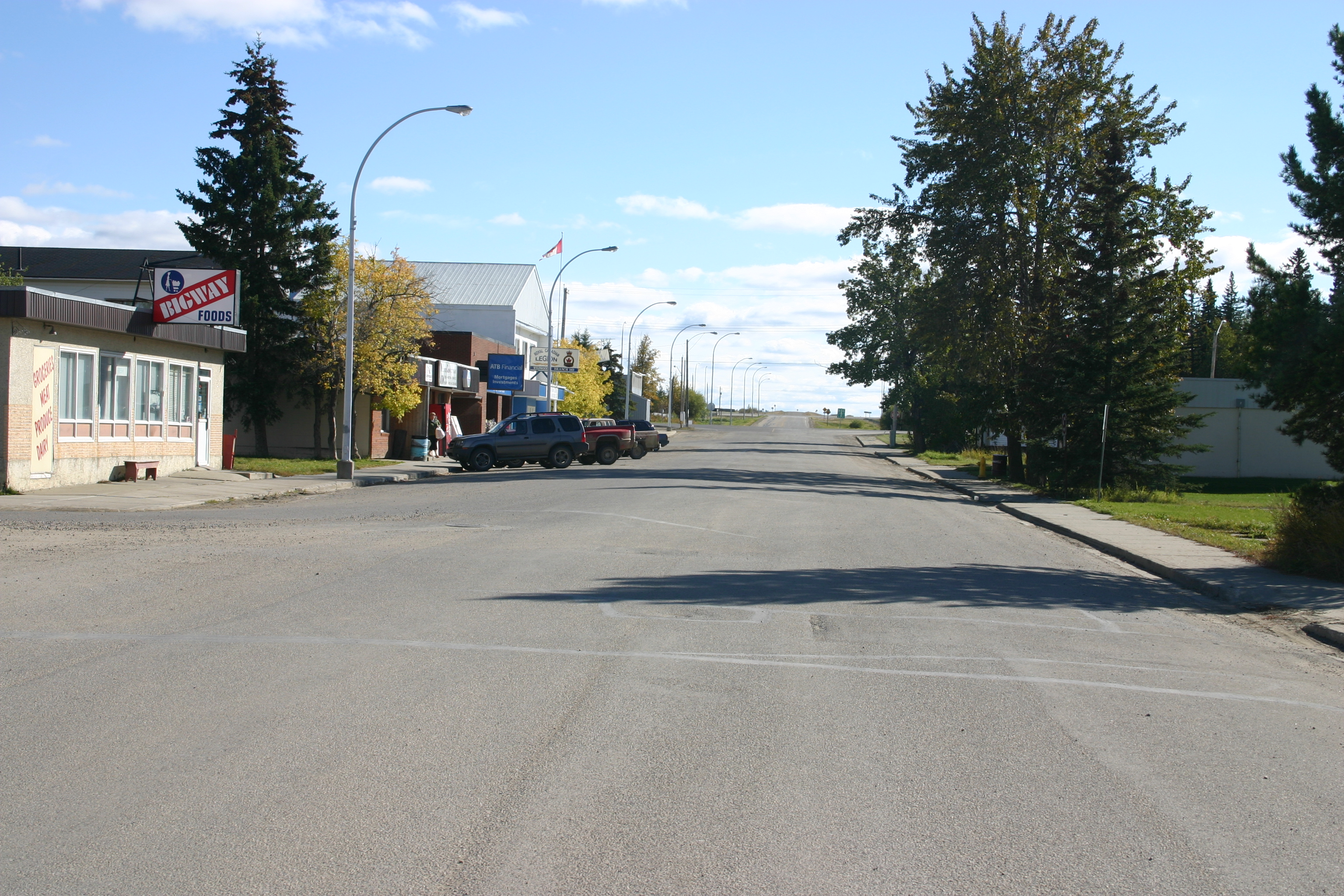
- Main Street
- Nickname: A Place For All Seasons
- Location of Wildwood in Alberta
- Coordinates: 53°36′34″N 115°14′15″W
- Country: Canada
- Province: Alberta
- Region: Central Alberta
- Census Division: No. 14
- Municipal district: Yellowhead County

Government
  - Mayor: Jim Eglinski
  - Governing body: Yellowhead County Council: Shawn Brian Berry; Sandra Cherniawsky; Anthony Giezen; Dawn Mitchell; Fred Priestley-Wright; David Russell; William Velichko; Jack Williams

Area (2021)
  - Land: 0.54 km^{2} (0.21 sq mi)
- Elevation: 778 m (2,552 ft)

Population (2021)
  - Total: 257
  - Density: 476.1/km^{2} (1,233/sq mi)
- Time zone: UTC−06:00 (Alberta Time)
- Postal code span: T0E 2M0
- Highways: Yellowhead Highway; Cowboy Trail
- Waterways: Lobstick River
- Website: Yellowhead County

Wildwood is a hamlet in west-central Alberta, Canada within Yellowhead County. It is on the Yellowhead Highway (Highway 16), approximately 112 kilometres (70 mi) west of Edmonton and 82 kilometres (51 mi) east of Edson. The Yellowhead Highway's intersection with Cowboy Trail (Highway 22) is 9 kilometres (5.6 mi) east of the hamlet. The Lobstick River, which flows from Chip Lake to the west, runs through the hamlet.

Statistics Canada recognizes Wildwood as a designated place.

Farming and ranching are an important part of Wildwood's economy. The Wildwood and District Agricultural Society was organized in 1939 and holds an Agricultural Fair every August.

== History ==
Originally named Junkins, Wildwood was established in 1908 by a group of 20 African-American immigrants as a block settlement. The new Black Canadian homesteaders arrived from Oklahoma and Texas, just three years after Alberta became a province in 1905. The Grand Trunk Pacific Railway arrived in Junkins in 1908. People arriving at "end of steel" transferred their goods to wagons and travelled to their homesteads.

== Demographics ==
In the 2021 Census of Population conducted by Statistics Canada, Wildwood had a population of 257 living in 118 of its 136 total private dwellings, a change of −5.9% from its 2016 population of 273. With a land area of 0.54 km^{2} (0.21 sq mi), it had a population density of 475.9/km^{2} (1,232.6/sq mi) in 2021.

As a designated place in the 2016 Census of Population conducted by Statistics Canada, Wildwood had a population of 273 living in 139 of its 157 total private dwellings, a change of −7.1% from its 2011 population of 294. With a land area of 0.54 km^{2} (0.21 sq mi), it had a population density of 505.6/km^{2} (1,309.4/sq mi) in 2016.

== See also ==
- List of communities in Alberta
- List of designated places in Alberta
- List of former urban municipalities in Alberta
- List of hamlets in Alberta
- Similar 1908 to 1910 Alberta homesteader settlements of Black Canadians:
  - Amber Valley, Alberta
  - Campsie, Alberta
  - Keystone (now Breton), Alberta
