= Entwistle, Alberta =

Entwistle
- Hamlet
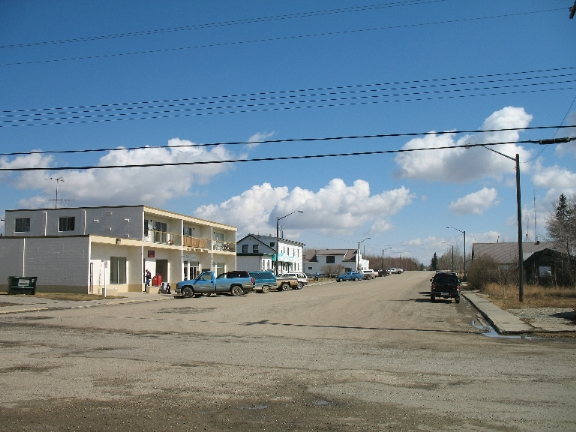
- Main Street
- Motto: Diamond Capital of Canada
- Location within Alberta
- Coordinates: 53°35′40″N 114°59′45″W
- Country: Canada
- Province: Alberta
- Region: Central Alberta
- Census Division: No. 11
- Municipal district: Parkland County
- Founded: 1908
- Incorporated: March 18, 1909 (village)
- Dissolved: December 31, 2000

Government
  - Type: Unincorporated
  - Mayor: Allan Gamble
  - Governing body: Parkland County Council: Natalie Birnie; Allan William Hoefsloot; Phyllis Kobasiuk; Kristina Kowalski; Sally Kucher Johnson; Rob Wiedeman
  - Federal riding: Yellowhead
  - Provincial riding: Lac Ste. Anne-Parkland

Area (2021)
  - Land: 1.96 km^{2} (0.76 sq mi)
- Elevation: 778 m (2,552 ft)

Population (2021)
  - Total: 429
  - Density: 219.4/km^{2} (568/sq mi)
- Time zone: UTC−06:00 (Alberta Time)
- Postal code span: T0E 0S0
- Area code: 780
- Highways: Highway 16 (TCH) (Yellowhead Highway); Highway 22 (Cowboy Trail)
- Waterways: Pembina River

Entwistle (/ˈɛntwɪsəl/) is a hamlet in Alberta, Canada, within Parkland County. It is at the Yellowhead Highway's intersection with Highway 22/Highway 16A, approximately 95 kilometres (59 mi) west of Edmonton. It sits on the east banks of the Pembina River near the halfway point between Edmonton and Edson.

Entwistle has grown to become a staging area for the oil and gas industry. It has an annual rodeo, the Pembina River Provincial Park, and calls itself the Diamond Capital of Canada.

It is within the federal riding of Yellowhead, provincial electoral district of Lac Ste. Anne-Parkland and Parkland County's Division 6.

== History ==
Entwistle was founded by James Entwistle, an employee of the Canadian Northern Railway (CNoR). Entwistle knew that construction of the railway would be halted on the east banks of the Pembina River for a few years as a bridge was built over the river. A boomtown would most certainly spring up. Seizing the opportunity, Entwistle staked a claim on a section of land very close to the Pembina River and the surveyed line for the Grand Trunk Pacific Railway in 1907. In 1908, as the railway construction camps drew closer to the Pembina River, Entwistle built a general store on his land, and left it in the care of his wife and children. The railway soon arrived, construction on the railway bridge started, and the boomtown formed around Entwistle's store.

Soon, there were enough people living in the boomtown to warrant a post office. But, to get a post office, they needed a name for the town. The town was informally known as "Pembina", after the river, but that name was rejected by the federal government, citing duplication. The names "Burke" and "Harmer" were also proposed, and again, each one rejected on the grounds of duplication. Entwistle was quite embarrassed when people started suggesting that he name the town after himself. Entwistle was fairly certain that 'Entwistle' was already the name of a town, as he knew of at least one town called Entwistle in England. But, Entwistle's wife Mary went and submitted the name 'Entwistle,' and it was accepted. For years after, Entwistle was often joked about how he found a way to put his name on the map, to which Entwistle would always reply, "It wasn't me who put it there – it was Mary."

Entwistle was officially incorporated as a village on March 26, 1909. James Entwistle was elected the first mayor in April 1909.

The railway trestle was completed in 1910. Shortly after, the Canadian Northern Railway came close to Entwistle, and built their own railway bridge from 1910 to 1912. The railway construction boom started moving west in 1912, but many stayed behind in Entwistle. In those early decades, Entwistle had a thriving agriculture industry, along with timber and the coal mines in neighbouring Evansburg.

Entwistle was dissolved on February 16, 1942, becoming a hamlet in the Municipal District of Pembina. Entwistle was once again incorporated as a village on January 1, 1955. Entwistle was once again dissolved on December 31, 2000, becoming a hamlet in Parkland County.

== Climate ==
Entwistle has a humid continental climate (Dfb) with warm summers with cool nights and long, cold winters with moderate snowfall. Precipitation peaks during the months of June and July.

Climate data for Entwistle, Alberta
Month	Jan	Feb	Mar	Apr	May	Jun	Jul	Aug	Sep	Oct	Nov	Dec	Year
Record high °C (°F)	14.0 (57.2)	17.5 (63.5)	22.0 (71.6)	25.0 (77.0)	32.0 (89.6)	33.5 (92.3)	35.5 (95.9)	34.8 (94.6)	30.5 (86.9)	30.0 (86.0)	19.0 (66.2)	16.5 (61.7)	35.5 (95.9)
Mean daily maximum °C (°F)	−6.1 (21.0)	−1.3 (29.7)	3.3 (37.9)	11.7 (53.1)	17.2 (63.0)	20.6 (69.1)	23.0 (73.4)	22.0 (71.6)	17.6 (63.7)	10.3 (50.5)	0.7 (33.3)	−4.0 (24.8)	9.6 (49.3)
Daily mean °C (°F)	−11.3 (11.7)	−7.5 (18.5)	−2.8 (27.0)	5.0 (41.0)	10.3 (50.5)	14.3 (57.7)	16.5 (61.7)	15.4 (59.7)	10.8 (51.4)	4.4 (39.9)	−4.1 (24.6)	−9.1 (15.6)	3.5 (38.3)
Mean daily minimum °C (°F)	−16.5 (2.3)	−13.6 (7.5)	−8.8 (16.2)	−1.9 (28.6)	3.4 (38.1)	8.0 (46.4)	10.0 (50.0)	8.9 (48.0)	4.0 (39.2)	−1.6 (29.1)	−8.9 (16.0)	−14.0 (6.8)	−2.6 (27.3)
Record low °C (°F)	−43.0 (−45.4)	−41.0 (−41.8)	−37.0 (−34.6)	−22.0 (−7.6)	−9.0 (15.8)	−2.0 (28.4)	1.5 (34.7)	−4.0 (24.8)	−5.5 (22.1)	−22.0 (−7.6)	−33.0 (−27.4)	−45.0 (−49.0)	−45.0 (−49.0)
Average precipitation mm (inches)	28.1 (1.11)	15.8 (0.62)	16.4 (0.65)	29.2 (1.15)	61.0 (2.40)	101.9 (4.01)	103.4 (4.07)	76.3 (3.00)	44.8 (1.76)	32.0 (1.26)	24.9 (0.98)	16.8 (0.66)	550.6 (21.68)
Average rainfall mm (inches)	1.0 (0.04)	0.3 (0.01)	0.4 (0.02)	20.0 (0.79)	55.1 (2.17)	101.9 (4.01)	103.4 (4.07)	76.3 (3.00)	43.8 (1.72)	17.9 (0.70)	2.8 (0.11)	1.7 (0.07)	424.5 (16.71)
Average snowfall cm (inches)	27.1 (10.7)	15.5 (6.1)	16.0 (6.3)	9.3 (3.7)	5.9 (2.3)	0.0 (0.0)	0.0 (0.0)	0.0 (0.0)	1.0 (0.4)	14.1 (5.6)	22.1 (8.7)	15.1 (5.9)	126.1 (49.6)
Average precipitation days (≥ 0.2 mm)	7.1	5.6	4.7	6.8	11.1	16.3	15.0	13.6	11.0	7.1	6.8	6.1	111.0
Average rainy days (≥ 0.2 mm)	0.35	0.11	0.35	5.2	10.4	16.3	15.0	13.6	11.0	5.1	0.90	0.60	78.9
Average snowy days (≥ 0.2 cm)	6.9	5.4	4.4	2.3	0.95	0.0	0.0	0.0	0.25	2.3	6.0	5.5	33.8
Source: Environment Canada

== Demographics ==
In the 2021 Census of Population conducted by Statistics Canada, Entwistle had a population of 429 living in 195 of its 231 total private dwellings, a change of −10.6% from its 2016 population of 480. With a land area of 1.96 km^{2} (0.76 sq mi), it had a population density of 218.9/km^{2} (566.9/sq mi) in 2021.

As a designated place in the 2016 Census of Population conducted by Statistics Canada, Entwistle had a population of 389 living in 178 of its 187 total private dwellings, a change of 8.4% from its 2011 population of 359. With a land area of 0.56 km^{2} (0.22 sq mi), it had a population density of 694.6/km^{2} (1,799.1/sq mi) in 2016.

== Economy ==
Entwistle's economy is supported by the nearby oil and gas industries. The tourism industry also plays a role in the local economy due to Entwistle's location at the approximate midpoint between Edmonton and Edson at the intersection of the Yellowhead Highway and Highway 22. Its tourism economy is seasonally supplemented by the nearby Pembina River Provincial Park and the annual Entwistle Rodeo every Canada Day weekend.

Entwistle is undergoing a tourism boom, as many have discovered that the stretch of the Pembina River that winds through Entwistle is ideal for tubing. The influx of tourists currently has Entwistle residents worrying that the river is being polluted and the community is being overrun. Residents also fear that the local cemetery is being damaged, as one of the more popular access routes to the river leads through the cemetery. Parkland County is building a new bypass route around the cemetery, which is expected to relieve some of the pressure.

== Diamond Capital of Canada ==
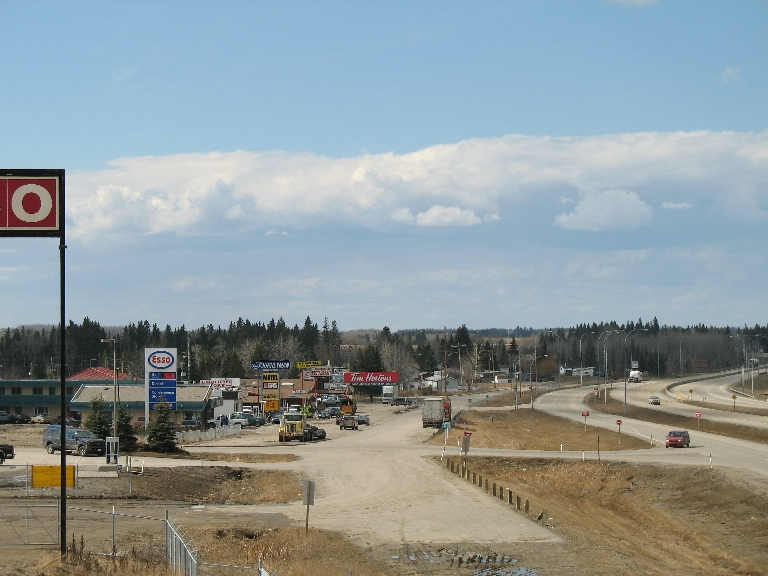
Entwistle's Restaurant Row

In 1958, Entwistle resident Einar Opdahl found a diamond in the banks of the Pembina River. The diamond weighed 0.83 carats (166 mg), and was described as being "a perfect octahedron with eight faces; a clear, colorless stone." Opdahl sold the diamond to gem cutter Ed Arsenault for $500. It was later claimed that Arsenault discovered the diamond.

When De Beers staked a claim for diamond mining in Alberta's Peace River country in 1990, people were reminded of the discovery of a diamond in the Pembina River near Entwistle. Several Alberta-based exploratory companies staked diamond claims near Entwistle and the Pembina River in 1992.

Opdahl and Arsenault's discovery and the mini-boom in diamond prospecting led Entwistle to claim the title "Diamond Capital of Canada" in 1994.

== Entwistle landmarks ==
=== Pembina River Bridge ===
The GTP railway bridge, whose construction caused Entwistle to spring up, is still in operation. It is a vital part of the Canadian National Railway main line. An average of 20 trains travel across it per day. The bridge itself is 280 metres (910 ft) long and 65 metres (214 ft) high. It is the fifth-highest railway bridge in Western Canada.

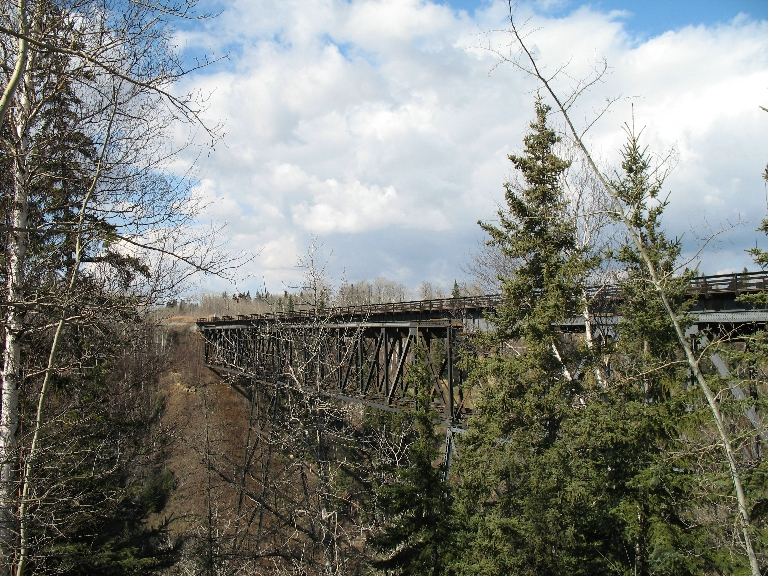
Pembina River Bridge

Construction on the bridge began in 1908. As there were no cranes big enough to carry steel, a massive false bridge and scaffolding were built out of wood. The steel bridge itself was completely pre-fabricated in Scotland. The Scottish engineers assembled the bridge in Scotland, ran their tests on it, and then carefully dismantled it. The bridge was shipped in pieces across the Atlantic, and brought out to Entwistle on the railway. The pieces began arriving in 1909, and the steel bridge was slowly assembled. The engineers’ measurements were so accurate, that no modifications were needed on site.

As the steel structure was laid in place, the wooden scaffolding and false bridge were gradually dismantled. Construction was completed in 1910. After its first century of use, it has required no major repairs; only routine maintenance.

=== Yellowhead Highway Bridge ===
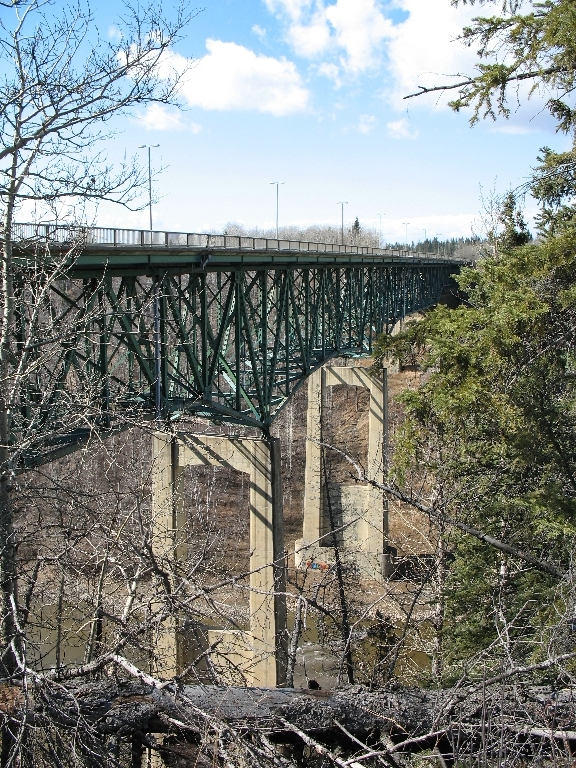
Yellowhead Highway Bridge

The Yellowhead Highway Bridge runs parallel to the Pembina River Viaduct and was built from 1961 to 1962. Even though it was opened to traffic in 1962, a grand opening was not held until July 24, 1963. A crowd of about 1500 assembled for the grand opening. Speeches were given by the chief bridge engineer, the deputy minister of highways, the mayors of Entwistle and Evansburg, and representatives of Entwistle's youth and senior communities. The ribbon was cut by Gordon Taylor, the Minister of Highways.

The bridge is 63 metres (207 ft) high and approximately 270 metres (900 ft) long. It cost $1.7 million. When construction was finished in 1962, it was the highest highway bridge in Alberta.

=== J.D. Read Memorial Building ===
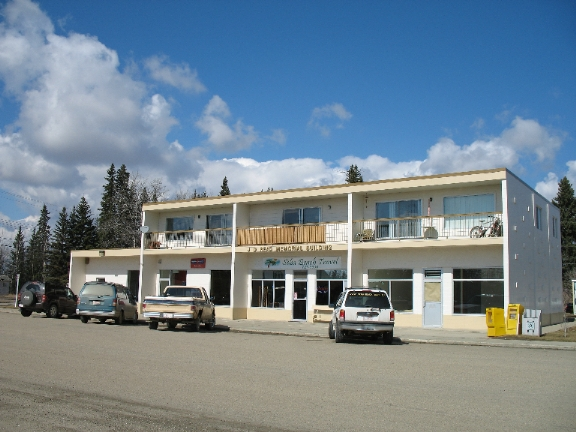
J.D. Read Memorial Building

John Davis Read was one of Entwistle's first citizens, having moved to town in 1908. He opened Entwistle's first lumber yard in 1910. In 1912, he started a feed business, which was hugely successful all throughout the 1940s. Read was also very interested in village matters, serving on the Entwistle Village Council from 1913 to 1942. He was mayor of Entwistle from 1925 to 1930, and 1935 to 1942.

Read sold his business and retired in 1946. When he died in 1965, he left the bulk of his estate to the Village of Entwistle, with the instruction that it be used "to build something that will be used by the whole community." In 1973, the J.D. Read Memorial Building was built. Until the early 2000s the J.D. Read Memorial Building housed Entwistle's bank, post office, and public library. As of 2023, it is home to an expanded post office and two small businesses.

== Entwistle vs. Old Entwistle ==
1.6 kilometres (1 mi) to the east of Entwistle lies the hamlet of Old Entwistle. Old Entwistle has a population of around 20. The citizens of Old Entwistle have always maintained that their hamlet is all that remains of the original village of Entwistle. Usually, they offer up their hamlet's name as the only proof.

When the railway bridge was completed in 1910, the GTP decided that, since Entwistle and Evansburg were so close to each other, the two villages could share one train station, in Evansburg. The people of Entwistle were furious, and demanded their own train station.

The GTP finally relented. Entwistle's train station had to be built one mile east of Entwistle, as this was the minimum distance required so as not to interfere with Evansburg's train station. The GTPR then proceeded to buy all the land around the train station. The GTPR then put the land up for sale, advertising the land around the train station as being "the future site of Entwistle." This area became known as the Grand Trunk Pacific subdivision, or simply, Grand Trunk. Despite the railway's efforts, the people of Entwistle opted to walk one mile to the train station, rather than move the town.

It is unknown when Grand Trunk started being referred to as Old Entwistle, but the name became common in the late 1980s. Old Entwistle is the original location of Entwistle's train station, not the whole community.

== See also ==
- List of communities in Alberta
- List of former urban municipalities in Alberta
- List of hamlets in Alberta
- Pembina River Provincial Park
