= William Stafford (mining engineer) =

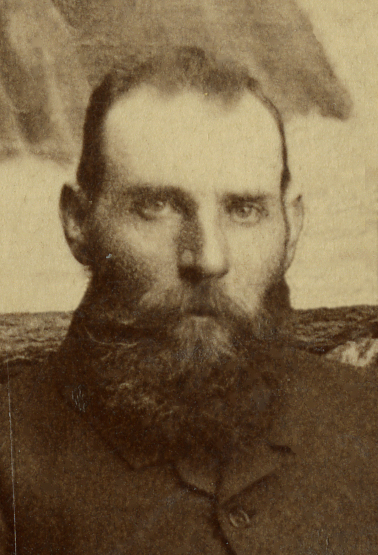
- William Stafford, courtesy of the Galt Museum & Archives
- Born: November 15, 1842; Patna, East Ayrshire, Scotland
- Died: May 12, 1907 (aged 64); Lethbridge, Alberta, Canada
- Resting place: Mountain View Cemetery, Lethbridge, Alberta, Canada
- Occupations: Mine superintendent, rancher
- Known for: Establishing the location of the City of Lethbridge
- Spouse: Jane Gibb
- Children: 14

William Stafford (November 15, 1842 – May 12, 1907) was a coal mining engineer and mine superintendent for the North Western Coal and Navigation Company who was responsible for determining the location of the City of Lethbridge, Alberta, Canada.

== Personal life ==
William Stafford was born in Patna, East Ayrshire, Scotland, on November 15, 1842. He was the only son of William Stafford and William's second wife, Margaret Finlay. On December 31, 1863, William married Jane Gibb of Auchinleck, Ayrshire, Scotland. While residing in Auchinleck, William and Jane Stafford had three sons (William Stafford, Henry Stafford, and John Stafford) and a daughter (Agnes Stafford, who died in infancy). They then emigrated to Westville, Nova Scotia, in 1871, where they had five additional sons (Richard Hill Stafford, Alexander Boswell Stafford, George Stafford, David Gibb Stafford, and James Walter Stafford) and two daughters (Agnes Stafford and Margaret Jane Stafford, who was a twin of David Gibb Stafford). In 1883, the family moved to the area that later became Lethbridge, Alberta, where they had an additional son (Elliott Torrence Stafford) and two additional daughters (Henrietta Stafford, who died at a young age, and Annie Laurie Stafford). The Staffords constructed a large ranch house on the bottomlands of the Belly River which became a major community and social center.

== Career ==
After an education in Scotland, William Stafford became the manager of coal mines operated by the Acadia Coal Company of Pictou in Nova Scotia, and he continued in that capacity until 1882. In that year, he was hired by Sir Alexander Galt as the manager and mine superintendent for the North Western Coal and Navigation Company to assess coal mining opportunities in the West. After investigating a number of possibilities, Stafford and his companion, Captain Nicholas Bryant, focused on Coal Banks on the Belly River due to the high quality of coal in that region. It was William Stafford who made the final decision as to the location of Drift Mine No. 1, which ultimately determined the location of the city of Lethbridge. In 1894, Stafford became Inspector of Mines for the company but then later resigned to pursue ranching and real estate interests. In order to provide accommodations for the increasing number of miners who were coming to the area, William Stafford purchased an area of land that became known as Staffordville, which he developed into lots for miners' houses. Stafford maintained an interest in coal mining, and at the time of his death, he was operating a private coal mine near Carmangay, north of Lethbridge.

== Death and legacy ==
William Stafford died on May 12, 1907, and was buried in the family plot in Mountain View Cemetery in Lethbridge. Following his death and the Belly River flood of 1908, the Stafford family moved into the city of Lethbridge.

A collection of historic photographs, documents, and personal items of William Stafford and his family is currently housed in the Galt Museum & Archives in Lethbridge. The section of north Lethbridge known as Staffordville (built around the No. 3 coal mine) as well as Stafford Drive and Stafford Place (a 10-story residential building) in Lethbridge were named in William Stafford's honor. A plaque honoring William Stafford and other coal pioneers, donated by the Lethbridge Miner's Library Club in collaboration with the Lethbridge Historical Society, was unveiled in Indian Battle Park on September 2, 1963. Entitled "Here We Begin to Mine the Coal," the plaque reads in part: "In 1882, William Stafford chose this place for the North West Coal and Navigation Company to begin mining coal, thus determining the location of Lethbridge."
