= Pembina River Provincial Park =

Provincial park in Alberta, Canada

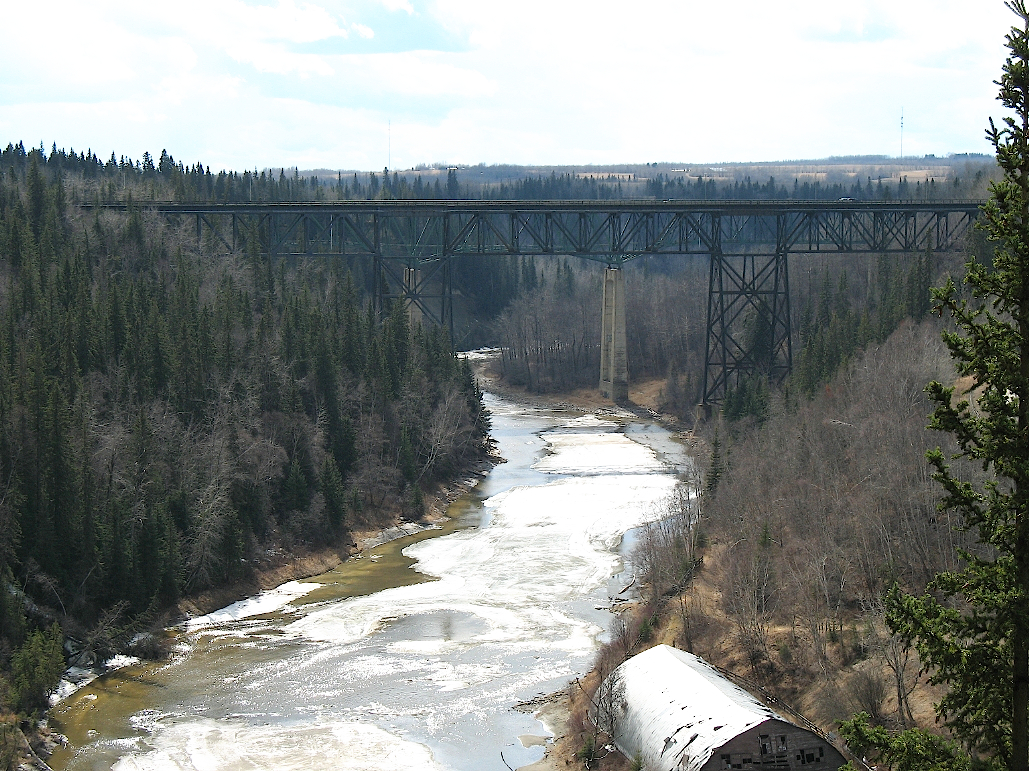
- Pembina River gorge in the park

- Location within Alberta
- Interactive map of Pembina River Provincial Park
- Location: Yellowhead County, Alberta, Canada
- Nearest city: Entwistle, Evansburg
- Coordinates: 53°36′28″N 114°59′50″W
- Area: 191 ha (470 acres)
- Established: September 21, 1953
- Governing body: Alberta Tourism, Parks and Recreation

Pembina River Provincial Park is a provincial park in central Alberta, Canada. It is located between the towns of Entwistle and Evansburg, a short distance from the Yellowhead Highway. The short 16A highway spur crosses the southern edge of the park, which is developed along the gorges of the Pembina River. The gorges cut in sandstone reach 62 meter in height and were formed during the glaciation.

== Activities ==
Birding and camping are the most common activities in the park. Water-related sports like fishing, canoeing and tubing are also popular.

== See also ==
- List of provincial parks in Alberta
- List of Canadian provincial parks
- List of National Parks of Canada
