= Willis Reese Bowen =

Willis Reese Bowen (February 6, 1875 – 1975) was one of the first settlers in Amber Valley, Alberta. His home, Obadiah Place, is a historic site.

Bowen was born in Butler County, Alabama, and was one of a group of black Americans who moved from Oklahoma to Canada in 1911, filing for homesteads north of Edmonton and east of Athabasca Landing. They were responding to the government's encouragement of new settlers in Alberta. Bowen organized the original group of five families who moved from Oklahoma. Others, like Bowen, had left the South after emancipation and Reconstruction, moving to Oklahoma for what they hoped would be better conditions.

Bowen originally settled in Vancouver, British Columbia, Canada, with his wife Jeanie (Gregory) Bowen and their children. Bowen hauled gravel by horse team, earning $25 per day. The family had little money and the oldest child, Mary, abandoned her plans of becoming a teacher in order to work as a maid and help support the family. Their baby girl developed a common coastal bacterial infection, suffering severe diarrhea, and died in 1912. The family and their eight children moved inland to Amber Valley, Alberta.

In Amber Valley, Bowen homesteaded. He also worked as a freighter who hauled goods from Athabasca to Lac La Biche and Wabasca. He also worked on a ranch in Saskatchewan, in a packing plant in Edmonton, and on Alberta grain farms. His eldest daughters also contributed to the family income by working as domestic workers in Athabasca and Edmonton.

Jean died in 1932 and Willis Bowen died in 1975 in Amber Valley, Alberta. His grandson, Oliver Bowen, became an engineer and designed the CTrain.

== Homestead ==
Bowen homesteaded Obadiah Place (Bowen Residence) in 1913. His original log cabin became a community meeting place, post office, and site of the first telephone. It was recognized as an Alberta historic site in 1999.

In 1938, his son Obadiah Bowen replaced the cabin, building a house in its place. Obadiah was pastor at an interdenominational church. He donated the land for it in 1953, located about a half mile from the house.
