= Oliver Bowen =

Canadian engineer (1942–2000)

- Born: December 21, 1942; Amber Valley, Alberta, Canada
- Died: January 1, 2000 (aged 57); Calgary, Alberta, Canada
- Monuments: Oliver Bowen LRT Maintenance Facility
- Occupation: Civil engineer

Oliver Bowen (December 21, 1942 – January 1, 2000) was a Canadian engineer who managed the design and construction of the first line of Calgary's light rail transit system: the CTrain. The City of Calgary acknowledged his engineering work by naming a light rail transit (LRT) maintenance facility in his honour.

== Family ==
Oliver Bowen was the grandson of Willis Reese Bowen and the son of Obadiah Bowen, who were among the first black settlers and civic leaders in Amber Valley. Following Clifford Sifton's 1910 Canadian immigration campaign to lure settlers from Southern US states as part of the Great Migration (African American), many black settlers came to Alberta. The Canadian government tried to bar black people from settling in Canada and hired agents to dissuade them, but was only successful in barring future settlers.

== Career ==
Bowen started working on Calgary's street construction crews and rose to manage the design and construction of Calgary's first LRT line. The Calgary C-Train started service May 25, 1981. In 1984 he was named the City of Calgary's Director of Transportation, a position he held until his retirement in 1998.

== Honours ==
In 2009, the City of Calgary named its largest maintenance facility after Bowen to honour his work. The Oliver Bowen LRT Maintenance Facility (OBMF) in northeast Calgary is a $6.5 million rail facility.

Bowen and his brother grew up with Cheryl Foggo, who profiled Bowen in a documentary. In May 2014, the play The Real McCoy was performed in tribute to Bowen, alongside a play by Cheryl Foggo.
