= Drinnan, Alberta =

Drinnan
- Former village
- Location of Drinnan Drinnan (Alberta)
- Coordinates: 53°25′28″N 117°32′40″W
- Country: Canada
- Province: Alberta
- Planning region: Upper Athabasca
- Town: Hinton
- Incorporated (village): January 1, 1957
- Amalgamated: April 1, 1957
- Time zone: UTC−7 (MST)
  - Summer (DST): UTC−6 (MDT)
- Forward sortation area: T7V
- Area code: 780 / 587

Drinnan is a former village in western Alberta, Canada. It was incorporated as a village on January 1, 1957, but amalgamated with Hinton three months later on April 1, 1957.

The former Village of Drinnan, commonly referred to now as the Hardisty District, is located in the valley portion of Hinton north of Canadian National Railway and south of the Athabasca River, approximately 5 km east of Hinton's original townsite. The village was centered on Athabasca Avenue and Drinnan Way, just south of Switzer Drive.

== Demographics ==
Population history of Drinnan
Year	Pop.	±%
1951	19	—
1956	53	+178.9%
Source: Statistics Canada

Prior to amalgamation with Hinton in 1957, the population of Drinnan was 53 according to the 1956 Census of Canada, up from its 1951 population of 19.

== See also ==
- List of former urban municipalities in Alberta
