= Lobstick, Alberta =

Coordinates: 53.605°N 115.163°W

Location of Lobstick in Alberta

Lobstick is a locality in central Alberta, Canada, within Yellowhead County.

It is located on the Yellowhead Highway (Highway 16), approximately 116 kilometres (72 mi) west of Edmonton. It is on the banks of the Lobstick River, downstream from Chip Lake. It has an elevation of 780 metres (2,560 ft).

== See also ==
- List of communities in Alberta
