= North Western Coal and Navigation Company =

Historical mining company

- Type: Public
- Industry: Rail transport Coal mining
- Founded: 1882; 144 years ago
- Headquarters: Lethbridge, Alberta, Canada
- Area served: Canada; Contiguous United States
- Key people: Sir Alexander Tilloch Galt (Founder), William Stafford (superintendent)

The North Western Coal and Navigation Company, also known as Alberta Railway and Coal Company or Alberta Railway and Irrigation Company, was a coal mining company formed in London, England, in 1882 by Sir Alexander Tilloch Galt, one of Canada's Fathers of Confederation. As part of his vision for Canada, Galt was committed to finding industries that would bring settlers to the District of Alberta of the North-West Territories. The company was founded to create a coal mining industry that could bring settlers to the North-West Territories. It was based in Lethbridge, Alberta, with his son Elliott Torrance Galt managing day-to-day operations. The company's superintendent was William Stafford. Money for this company came from a consortium of investors from Canada, England, and the United States.

== Galts' narrow gauge railway ==
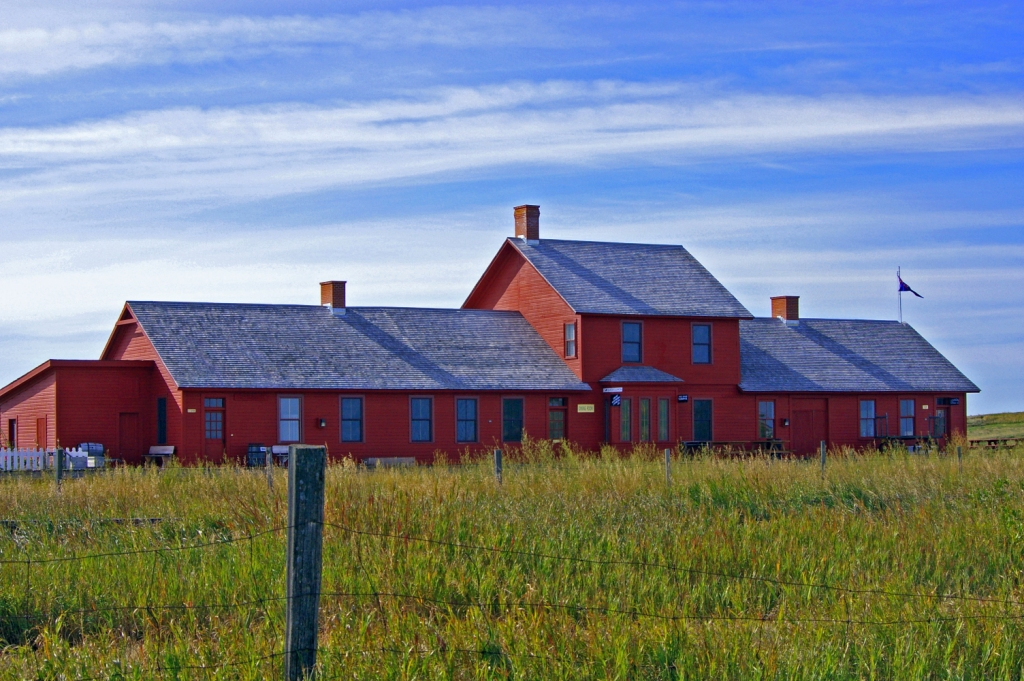
Galt International Depot, originally at the border crossing at Coutts, Alberta/Sweetgrass, Montana. The depot was moved in 1999 to the Galt Historic Railway Park at Stirling, Alberta.

NWC&NC built the steamboat Baroness along with a number of barges in 1883 to ship coal to Medicine Hat, Assiniboia District, by the Oldman River. However, this soon proved to be impractical, as the time of navigable high water was short and undependable, and shoals and sandbanks proved hazardous. Only 3200 tons of coal was delivered to Medicine Hat in two years. Sir Alexander Galt had already conceived the idea of a narrow-gauge railway, and in 1884 the federal government confirmed the British charter and empowered the NWC&NC to build a 3 ft (914 mm)-gauge railway from Dunmore, Assiniboia, to its coal properties at Lethbridge. NWC&NC contracted Canadian Pacific Railway to buy a minimum of 20,000 tons of coal a year for five years at $5 a ton delivered to Medicine Hat. Canada's Governor General, the Marquis of Landsdowne, demonstrated the Dominion government's support of the Galt enterprises, by opening the Galts' narrow-gauge railway on October 19, 1885, in Lethbridge.

=== Alberta Railway & Coal Company ===
Alberta Railway & Coal Company
Overview
- Locale: Lethbridge, Alberta, Canada, to Great Falls, Montana, United States
- Dates of operation: 1889–1912

Technical
- Track gauge: 1,435 mm (4 ft 8 1/2 in) standard gauge

In 1889, the Alberta Railway & Coal Company was incorporated by NWC&NC to build a 3 ft (914 mm) narrow-gauge railway from Lethbridge to the Canada–United States border, a distance of 105 kilometres (65 mi). Coincident with the building of the AR&CC line in 1890, the Galts received a Montana charter for the narrow-gauge Great Falls and Canada Railway (GF&CR). The 3 ft (914 mm) line ran from Sweetgrass, opposite Coutts, to Great Falls, Montana. By extending their railway into the United States, the Galts were able to enlarge the market for Lethbridge coal. In 1901, the GF&CR line was converted to standard gauge, and was purchased by the Montana Great Northern Railway, a subsidiary of the Great Northern Railway (U.S.).

Originally leased to the CPR in 1893, the line from Dunmore to Lethbridge (the AR&CC had acquired the properties of the NWC&NC in 1891), the line was upgraded to standard gauge, and was purchased outright in 1897 and became the first leg of the Crow's Nest Pass branch railway to the CPR's mineral properties in the Kootenay area of south-eastern British Columbia, with the right to extend the line to Hope.

=== Alberta Railway & Irrigation Company ===
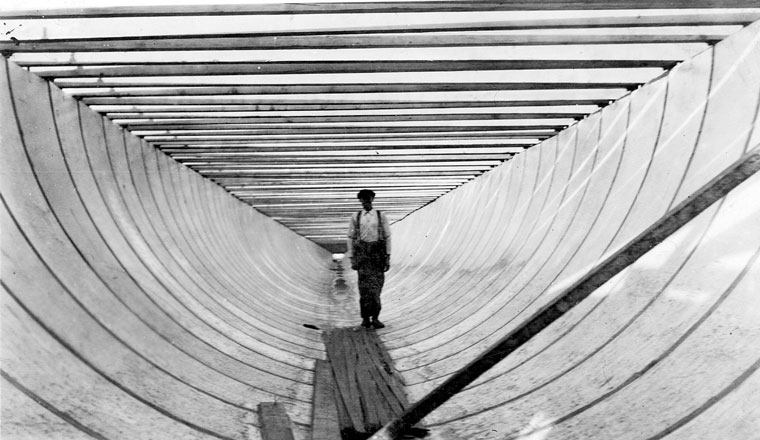
Construction of the Lethbridge Northern Irrigation District flume across the Oldman River

To further the AR&CC's aims to develop the granted land and attract settlement, Elliott Galt was made aware that farming, not ranching, was the appropriate means of development, and irrigation was the key. He was approached by Charles Ora Card of the Utah-based Church of Jesus Christ of Latter-day Saints, who detailed his vision of using the local river systems for irrigation. Card had visited Canada in 1886 and had returned in 1887 with a group that settled on Lees Creek and established the village of Cardston, Alberta. Under Brigham Young, the Mormons had established a thriving community centred on Salt Lake City and had pioneered and gained expertise in farming by irrigation in an area of deficient rainfall.

An agreement was reached with the Mormons in 1891, whereby they would lease 2,800 square kilometres (700,000 acres) of land, bring in settlers, and provide labour for building the canal system. Economic depression and the lack of capital ended the project. Though temporarily thwarted the Galts continued to pursue their plan for irrigation and soon afterwards, with an upturn in the economy and a new Liberal government with Clifford Sifton as Minister of the Interior, who pursued a vigorous policy of immigration, the fortunes of the Galt enterprises changed for the better. An agreement was reached with the Government of Canada, whereby in an exchange of lands the AR&CC was able to assemble a solid block of 2,000 square kilometres (500,000 acres) adjacent to the St. Mary River thus making large-scale irrigation feasible. A new contract was signed with the Mormons in which they were to construct the canal system, and in return for their labour they were to be paid "one-half in cash and one-half in land, the land with water rights being valued at three dollars per acre, to a total of $75,000 and 25,000 acres." A remission of the survey fee of ten cents per acre was also granted by the government. The church-sponsored immigrants, to whom Galt advanced the costs of transportation, were to establish themselves in hamlets, one each in the tracts 32 and 48 kilometres (20 and 30 mi) south of Lethbridge – the communities of Stirling and Magrath were established in 1889 as per contract with AR&IC. The main canal was completed in August 1900.

That same year the St. Mary’s River Railway Company was incorporated to provide access and serve the settlers benefiting from the irrigation system. It reached Cardston in 1903, with permission to extend the 3 ft (910 mm)-gauge line. At Raymond a sugar beet factory was erected. A further consolidation of land took place in 1900, followed in 1902 by the purchase of the adjacent 200,000-hectare (500,000-acre) tract at one dollar an acre after the awarding of credits amounting to two dollars an acre. Payment was to be made in ten equal annual installments. The stipulation was that the land could not be sold for more than five dollars an acre, and the unsold balance, after 15 years, would revert to the government. In 1904 the Galt companies were merged into a new corporation, the Alberta Railway and Irrigation Company (AR&IC). The St. Mary Canal was enlarged and a beginning was made on a canal from the Milk River, halted by the Boundary Waters Treaty of 1909 between the United States and Canada, dividing the waters of the two rivers equally between the two countries. In 1912 the Canadian Pacific Railway leased the AR&IC for 999 years, thus ending the independence of the Galt enterprise.

== See also ==
- Galt Historic Railway Park – Stirling, Alberta
