= Pembina River (Alberta) =

River in Alberta, Canada

Coordinates: 54°44′36″N 114°17′01″W

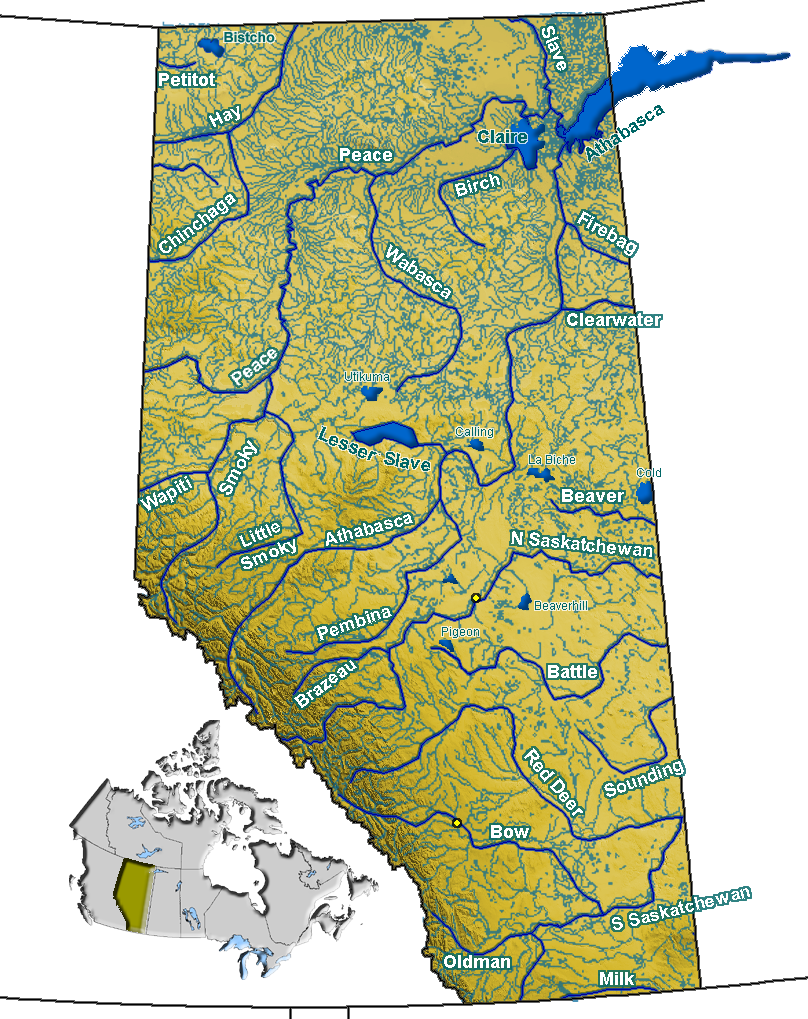
Pembina River in Alberta

The Pembina River is a tributary of the Athabasca River in central Alberta, Canada. "Pembina" /ˈpɛmbɪnə/ is an Indigenous word "Pimbina" (Cree) for the high bush cranberry or summerberry (Viburnum trilobum). The river gives the name to the Pembina oil field, an oil- and gas-producing region centered on Drayton Valley. The environmentalist group Pembina Institute also took its name from the river.

== Course ==
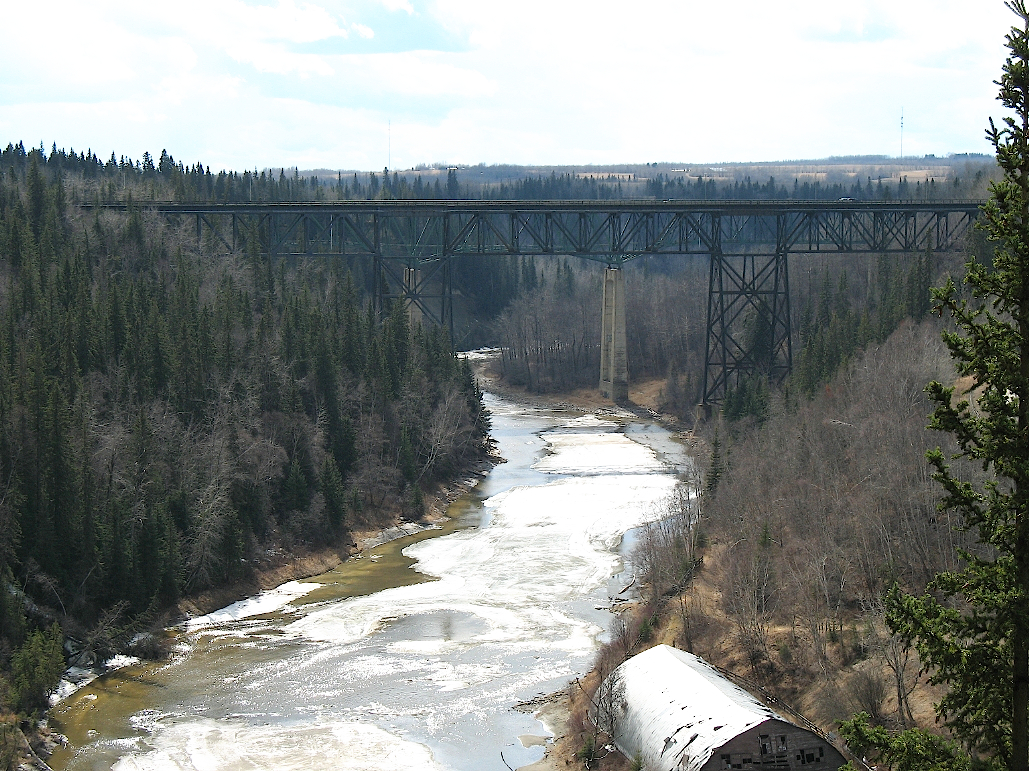
Pembina River at Entwistle

The Pembina River originates in the Canadian Rockies foothills, west of Pembina Forks, at the base of Redcap Mountain. It flows eastwards for 547 kilometres (340 mi) before it merges with the Athabasca River 64 kilometres (40 mi) west of the town of Athabasca, and has a drainage area of 12,900 square kilometres (5,000 sq mi). Water originating in the Pembina River goes through numerous merges until reaching the Mackenzie River, discharging into the Arctic Ocean.

Communities along the Pembina River include Westlock, Sangudo, Entwistle and Evansburg. Pembina River Provincial Park is along the gorges of the river between Evansburg and Entwistle. Another protected area along the river is the Pembina River Natural Area, 20 kilometres (12 mi) northeast of Cherhill in aspen parkland.

== Tributaries ==
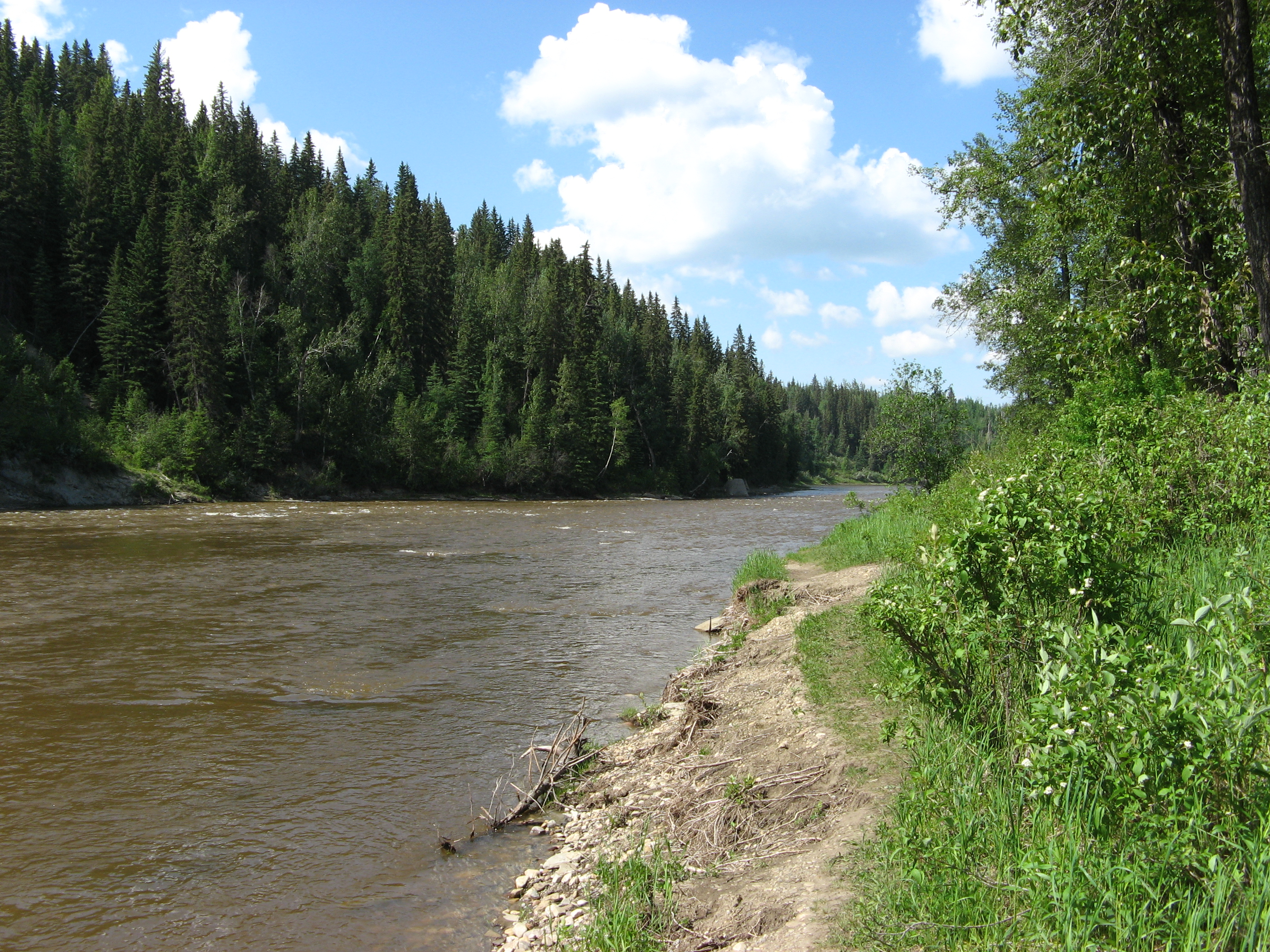
The Pembina River

- Rat Creek
- Bailey Creek
- Hanson Creek
- Crooked Creek
- Centre Creek
- Lovett River
- Moose Lake
- Lund Creek
- Fairfax Lake
- Errot Lake
- Dismal Creek
- Wolf Creek
  - Wolf Lake
- Zeta Lake
- Rat Creek
- Paddy Creek
- Sinkhole Lake
- Bigoray River
- Mishow Creek
- Lobstick River
  - Chip Lake, Deep Creek, Alpha Lake, Poison Creek, Beta Lake, Sunset Lake, Brule Creek, Little Brule Creek
- Michaud Lake
- Coyote Lake Creek
  - Ice Lake
- Oldman Lake
- MacDonald Creek
  - Lac La Nonne
- Newton Creek
  - Newton Lake, George Lake, Kirchner Lake
- Paddle River
  - Paddle River Reservoir, Little Paddle River
- Wabash Creek
  - Fernand Lake
- Dapp Creek
  - Lac des Jones, Bolloque Creek, Muskeg Lake
- Shoal Creek
  - Shoal Lake, Baird Lake, Camp Creek
- Crane Lake
- Killsyth Creek
  - Killsyth Lake
- Flatbrush Creek

Numerous small lakes such as Brock Lake, Oldman Lake, Majeau Lake, Lac La Nonne, George Lake, Armstrong Lake, Shoal Lake, Steele Lake, Cross Lake are also located within the river's basin.

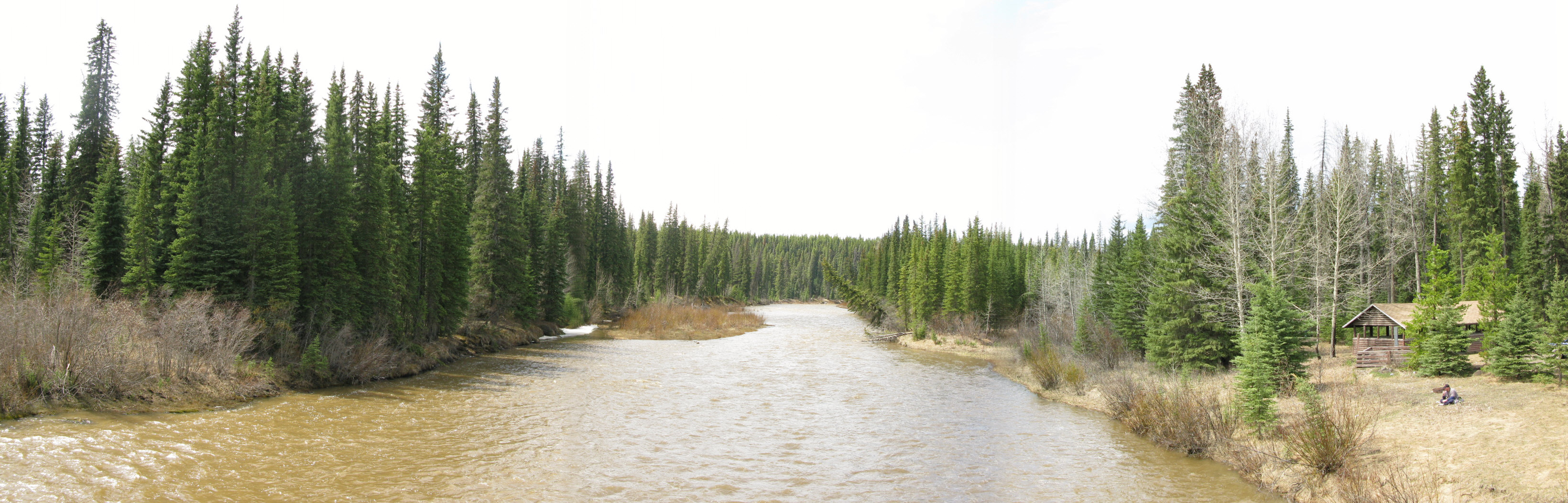
The Pembina River from Alberta Highway 40

== See also ==
- List of rivers of Alberta
