= Violet King Henry =

Canadian lawyer (1929–1982)

- Born: Violet Pauline King; October 18, 1929; Calgary, Alberta, Canada
- Died: March 30, 1982 (aged 52); New York City, U.S
- Education: University of Alberta
- Occupations: Lawyer, activist
- Known for: First Black Canadian woman lawyer

Violet Pauline King Henry (October 18, 1929 – March 30, 1982) was a Canadian lawyer and activist. King was the first Black woman lawyer in Canada, the first Black person to graduate law in Alberta, and the first Black person to be admitted to the Alberta Bar. She was also the first woman named to a senior management position with the American national YMCA.

== Early life and education ==
=== Early life ===
Violet Pauline King was born on October 18, 1929, in Calgary, Alberta, the daughter of John Emerson King and Stella King. Her birth occurred just weeks before the beginning of the Great Depression, a global economic crisis that shaped the social and economic conditions of her childhood in Calgary. She grew up in the city's Hillhurst–Sunnyside neighbourhood with three siblings, Vern, Lucille, and Ted.

=== Family ===
King's father John and his extended family moved to Amber Valley, Alberta in 1911, as part of a group of African American farmers migrating from Oklahoma to Alberta, both as part of the Great Migration and to avoid racist laws. They settled in Keystone, Alberta (now Breton, Alberta) southwest of Edmonton. They came to Canada as part of a Canadian government campaign to entice Southern US farmers to the Canadian Prairies, although Clifford Sifton's plan had expected white settlers.

King's parents, John and Stella, moved to Calgary in 1919, where her father worked as a porter and her mother worked as a seamstress. Many African Americans, including her father, worked as porters in Canada. Both of her parents were considered important members of the Black community in Calgary. When she graduated, the Brotherhood of Sleeping Car Porters, a key player in the American civil rights movement, gave significant attention to her achievements and both the union's president and vice president travelled from New York and Detroit to make a presentation to her in Calgary. She was also treasurer of the Calgary Brotherhood Council.

=== Education ===
King studied at Crescent Heights High School, where she was president of the Girls Association in grade 12 and had her yearbook captioned with her unusual intention to study criminal law. She started at the University of Alberta in 1948, joining the feminist Blue Stocking Club (modelled after the Blue Stockings Society), serving as Vice-President of the Students Union and the representative of the Students’ Union to the National Federation of Canadian University Students. She became class historian for her final year and was the Alberta representative to the International Student Services Conference in Hamilton in 1952.

To finance her studies, she taught piano. An active student, King was one of just four students to receive an Executive "A" gold ring at Colour Night, the university's annual celebration of student contributions to the university – the other three students were future premier Peter Lougheed, Ivan Head (future advisor to Pierre Trudeau), and lawyer Garth Fryett.

== Legal studies and career ==
=== Law school ===
King graduated with her law degree in 1953 and was admitted to the Alberta bar in 1954. At the time, these accomplishments were reported prominently by newspapers, including the Calgary Herald, The Albertan, and the Edmonton Journal. When King started her law degree, there were just three women in a class of 142. King’s legal achievements were highly recognized as significantly historic in Canadian law.

=== Legal practice ===
King practiced criminal law in Calgary, articling with E.J. McCormick. Though, King did more than just article with E.J McCormick, as through the great efforts of her own, King worked on criminal cases, being assigned five murder cases, and represented clients in domestic violence. Successfully, she appealed an adjournment for a client she represented. King also notably worked on estate law cases. King dedicated many years to being a lawyer, and habitually spoke about racial, gender, and inter-religious relations. She later moved to Ottawa, around 1956, to join the federal civil service in a senior administrative role at Citizenship and Immigration Canada, where she was promoted twice. She served during the time that Ellen Fairclough was named Canada's first woman member of cabinet and Minister of Immigration. By 1962, the Department had taken major steps to eliminate racism and respect the new Bill of Rights.

=== YMCA executive roles ===
In 1963, King moved to the United States, working in executive roles for the YW/YMCA in Newark, New Jersey, and Chicago, Illinois, gaining prominence for helping African Americans find work. In 1976, she was appointed Executive Director of the national Council of YMCA’s Organizational Development Group, becoming the first woman named to a senior management position with the American national YMCA.

== Personal life ==
In 1965, King married Godfrey C. Henry, a Trinidadian-American and graduate of Columbia University's Graduate School of Political Science. The couple lived in Newark, New Jersey, where King was beginning the next phase of her career in organizational leadership. In 1966, at the age of 36, King-Henry gave birth to the couple's only child, a daughter, Jo-Anne Henry.

The family later lived in Chicago, Illinois, as King's work with the YMCA expanded and her professional responsibilities grew national in scope during the era of the civil rights movement.

Civil rights activism also appeared within her family. Her brother Ted King served as president of the Alberta Association for the Advancement of Coloured People and in the late 1950s brought a case challenging racial discrimination after being refused service at a Calgary hotel.

King died of cancer in New York City on 30 March 1982 at the age of 52.

== Legacy ==
=== Firsts ===
- In 1953, Henry became the first Black graduate of the University of Alberta Faculty of Law.
- In 1954, she became the first Black person admitted to the Alberta bar.
- In 1954, she also became the first Black woman admitted to the bar in Canada.

=== Commemorations ===
King is remembered for combating oppression in society and in the workplace for people of colour throughout her career and during her speech at the Beta Sigma Phi Sorority Banquet. She accomplished an impressive number of achievements that were deemed unreachable for Black women.

Political scientist Malinda Smith featured King in a research project, funded by the Pierre Elliott Trudeau Foundation, to highlight the achievements of women in Canadian black history through a series of brief videos and thereby "make the hidden visible".

King was also featured in the documentary Secret Alberta: The Former Life of Amber Valley, by filmmaker Cheryl Foggo in 2017; King was a bridesmaid at Foggo's mother's wedding.

In 2021, the Federal Building Plaza located in Alberta was officially renamed the Violet King Henry Plaza, to recollect King’s Canadian legacy and activism in dismantling systemic, racial and gender barriers.

In 2022, Heritage Calgary and the UCalgary Black Law Students' Association presented a plaque recognizing the former residence of the King family to the residence's owner Angela Pucci.

Also in 2022, in honor of King's contributions to Canadian law and Black education in Canada, the University of Alberta created a $20,000 scholarship named after her, the Violet King Henry Law School Award, available to Black students studying at the university's faculty of law.

On October 18th, 2023, a Google Doodle was released on what would have been King's 94th birthday, to celebrate her birth.
