= Evansburg, Alberta =

Evansburg
- Hamlet
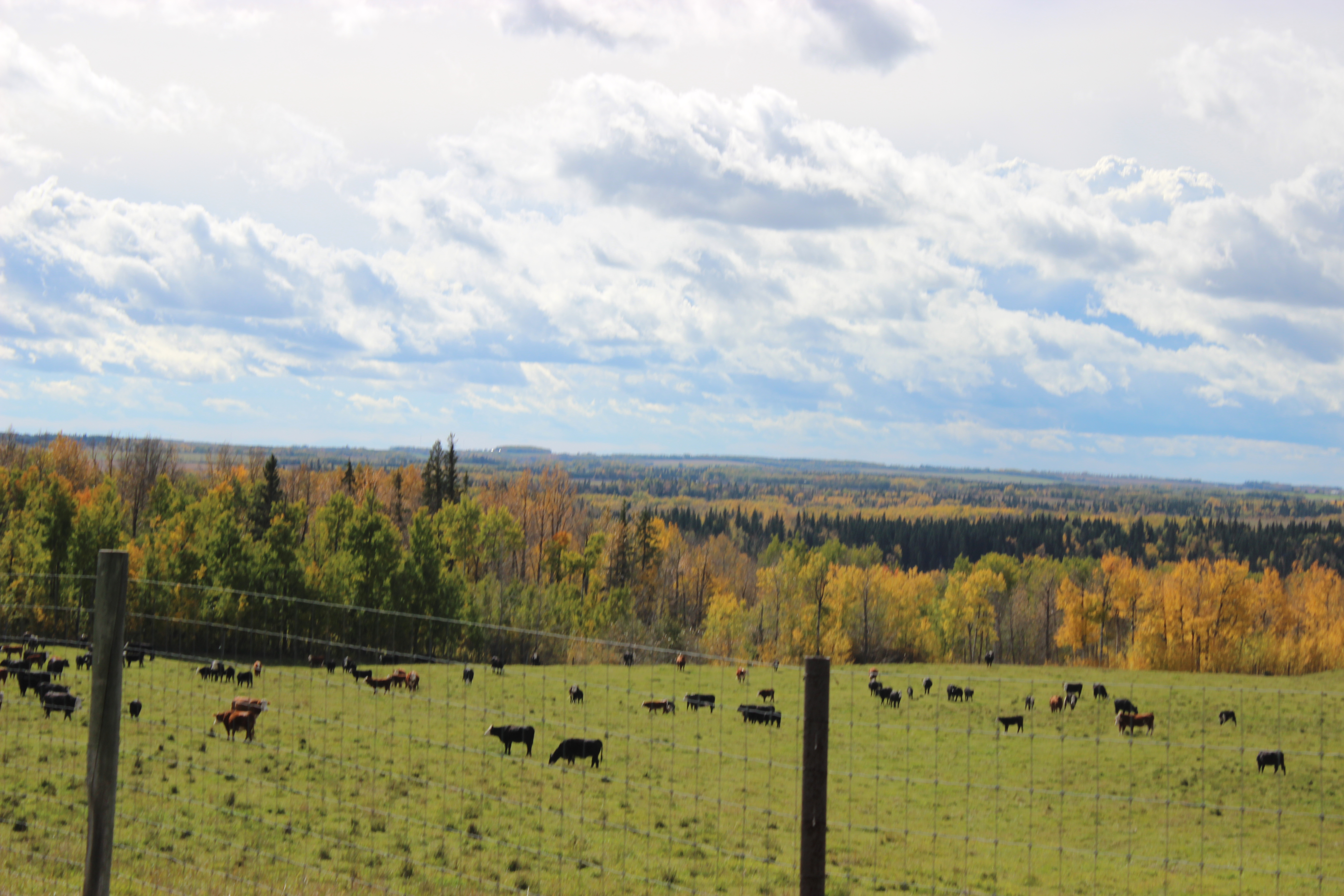
- Motto: Home of the Grouch
- Location of Evansburg in Alberta
- Coordinates: 53°36′08″N 115°01′10″W
- Country: Canada
- Province: Alberta
- Region: Central Alberta
- Municipal district: Yellowhead County
- Dissolved: June 30, 1998

Government
  - Type: Unincorporated
  - Mayor: Jim Eglinski
  - Governing body: Yellowhead County Council: Shawn Brian Berry; Sandra Cherniawsky; Anthony Giezen; Dawn Mitchell; Fred Priestley-Wright; David Russell; William Velichko; Jack Williams

Area (2021)
  - Land: 2.84 km^{2} (1.10 sq mi)

Population (2021)
  - Total: 717
  - Density: 252.8/km^{2} (655/sq mi)
- Time zone: UTC−06:00 (Alberta Time)
- Postal code span: T0E 0T0
- Highways: Highway 16A
- Waterways: Pembina River
- Website: Yellowhead County

Evansburg is a hamlet in west-central Alberta, Canada, within Yellowhead County. It is located on Highway 16A, approximately 88 kilometres (55 mi) west of Edmonton and 96 kilometres (60 mi) east of Edson. The hamlet is adjacent to the Pembina River and the Pembina River Provincial Park.

Evansburg was previously incorporated as a village until June 30, 1998, when it dissolved to become a hamlet within Yellowhead County. Statistics Canada recognizes Evansburg as a designated place.

== History ==
Evansburg is named after Harry Marshall Erskine Evans, former Edmonton mayor and advisor to the Government of Alberta. The post office dates back to 1914.

== Demographics ==
In the 2021 Census of Population conducted by Statistics Canada, Evansburg had a population of 717 living in 334 of its 371 total private dwellings, a change of −9.8% from its 2016 population of 795. With a land area of 2.84 km^{2} (1.10 sq mi), it had a population density of 252.5/km^{2} (653.9/sq mi) in 2021.

As a designated place in the 2016 Census of Population conducted by Statistics Canada, Evansburg had a population of 795 living in 370 of its 419 total private dwellings, a change of −9.7% from its 2011 population of 880. With a land area of 2.75 km^{2} (1.06 sq mi), it had a population density of 289.1/km^{2} (748.7/sq mi) in 2016.

== Arts and culture ==
The Tipple Park Museum preserves and showcases Evansburg's railway, agricultural and coal mining history. The museum's symbol is a tipple, or a structure at a mine used to load ore or coal.

=== Home of the Grouch ===
Evansburg has gained a degree of fame across Canada for being the "Home of the Grouch." Every August, as part of the community's Pembina Valley Daze festival, the community chooses the "Town Grouch".

The tradition began in 1974, when local artist John Lauer was commissioned to create a new welcome sign for the community. To add some humour to the sign, he listed Evansburg's population as "603 people, 29 dogs, 41 cats, and one grouch." Speculation began as to who the grouch was. In 1979, the Evansburg Chamber of Commerce decided to settle the question by holding an election, in which the community's grouch was elected by the people. The election has been held annually ever since. Lauer himself was elected the grouch in 1995.

In the 1990s, Evansburg decided to capitalize on this tradition by adopting the slogan "Home of the Grouch" and using a scowling coal miner (to also honour its coal mining heritage) as its logo.

Far from being an honorary title, the Town Grouch has become a real position with real responsibilities. The chosen citizen becomes Evansburg's ambassador, and represents the community at trade shows and conferences across Canada. Town Grouch is given a uniform consisting of overalls, a pick-axe, and a miner's helmet, all designed to mimic the community's logo. The Town Grouch's home also gets the honorary address of "10 Frowning Street."

In recent years, the election has been replaced with a competition to see who can raise the most money for Pembina Valley Daze.

== Infrastructure ==
Transportation

As a flag stop Via Rail's The Canadian calls at the Evansburg railway station three times per week in each direction.

== See also ==
- List of communities in Alberta
- List of designated places in Alberta
- List of former urban municipalities in Alberta
- List of hamlets in Alberta
