= Calder, Edmonton =

Calder
- Neighbourhood
- Location of Calder in Edmonton
- Coordinates: 53.589°N 113.529°W
- Country: Canada
- Province: Alberta
- City: Edmonton
- Quadrant: NW
- Ward: Anirniq
- Sector: Mature area

Government
  - Administrative body: Edmonton City Council
  - Councillor: Erin Rutherford

Area
  - Total: 1.35 km^{2} (0.52 sq mi)
- Elevation: 679 m (2,228 ft)

Population (2012)
  - Total: 4,059
  - Density: 3,006.7/km^{2} (7,787/sq mi)
  - Change (2009–12): ▲0.3%
  - Dwellings: 1,960

Calder is a residential neighbourhood in northwest Edmonton, Alberta, Canada. The area was originally part of the Hudson's Bay Company reserve and was settled by employees of the Grand Trunk Pacific Railway.

As described below, Calder was originally an independent village incorporated under the name of West Edmonton that was developed to house the workforce at the railway's roundhouse, repair shop and shunt yards. Calder became a part of the City of Edmonton in 1917.

The neighbourhood is bounded by 127 Street to the west, 132 Avenue to the north, 113A Street to the east, and 127 Avenue to the south. It also includes a small area south of 127 Avenue and north of the Canadian National rail line between 124 Street and 127 Street.

The community is represented by the Calder Community League, established in 1920, which maintains a community hall and outdoor rink at 120 Street and 127 Avenue.

== Village of West Edmonton (Calder) ==
West Edmonton or Calder was originally a village that was absorbed by the City of Edmonton on April 17, 1917. Comprising one quarter section, it was incorporated as the Village of West Edmonton on July 6, 1910. Within three years, the community was referred to as the Village of Calder.

The former village was at the northeast corner of 127 Street and 127 Avenue just north of the Hudson's Bay Company reserve lands. The Hudson's Bay Company, "hoping to benefit from rising real estate prices in pre World War I Edmonton, delayed the sale and development of about 1,600 acres (6 km^{2}) of its reserve lands."

The community owed its existence to the railway. The Grand Trunk Pacific Railway located its roundhouse, repair shops and shunting yard near the site of the community.

The first permanent buildings in Calder were built in 1909.

== Demographics ==
In the City of Edmonton's 2012 municipal census, Calder had a population of 4,059 living in 1,960 dwellings, a 0.3% change from its 2009 population of 4,047. With a land area of 1.35 km^{2} (0.52 sq mi), it had a population density of 3,006.7 people/km^{2} in 2012.

== Residential development ==
According to the 2001 federal census, approximately one residence in eight (11.5%) predates the end of World War II, with some of these residences dating from as early as 1910. However, most of the residences in the modern neighbourhood of Calder date from after 1945. Just under half (44.5%) of all residences were built between 1946 and 1960. One in five residences (17.1%) were built during the 1960s and another one in five residences (19.0%) were built during the 1970s. The remaining 7.8% were built after 1980.

The most common type of residence in the neighbourhood, according to the 2005 municipal census, is the single-family dwelling. These account for approximately two out of every three (65%) of all the residences in the neighbourhood. Another one in five residences (19%) are duplexes. One in seven residences (14%) are rented apartments in low-rise buildings with fewer than five stories. There are a few other types of residences in the neighbourhood accounting for approximately 1% of all residences. Just over half the residences (55%) are owner-occupied and just under half the residences (45%) are rented.

== Population mobility ==
The population of the neighbourhood is somewhat mobile. According to the 2005 municipal census, roughly one resident in five (18.2%) had moved within the previous twelve months. Another one in five residents (20.2%) had moved within the previous one to three years. Just under half the residents (47.2%) had lived at the same address for five years or longer.

== Schools ==
There are two schools in the neighbourhood. Calder Elementary School is operated by the Edmonton Public School System and the St. Edmund Catholic Elementary Junior High School is operated by the Edmonton Catholic School System.

== See also ==
- Edmonton Federation of Community Leagues
- List of former urban municipalities in Alberta
