= Chip Lake (Alberta) =

Lake in Alberta, Canada

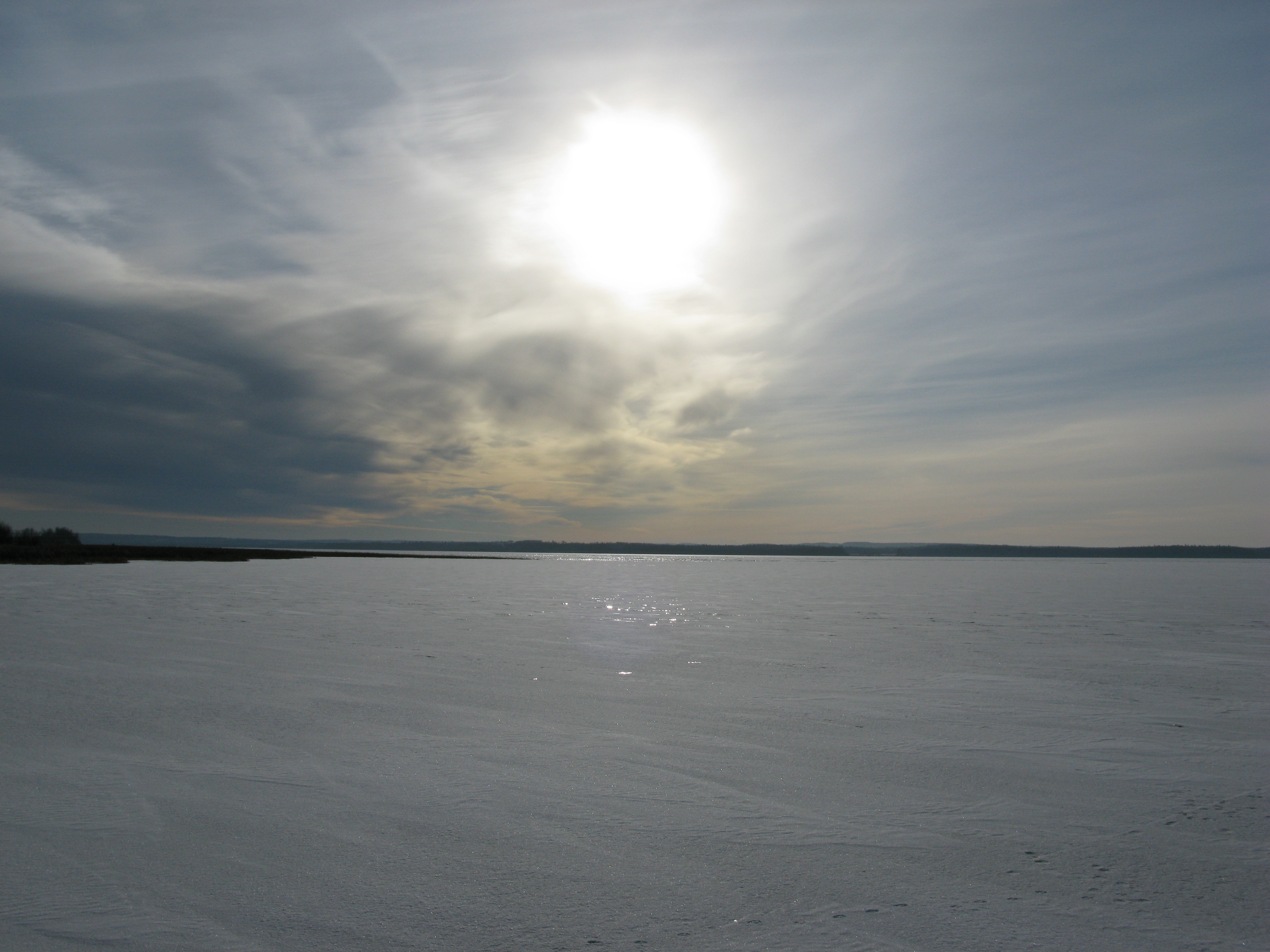
- A frozen Chip Lake seen from the north shore

- Location within Alberta
- Location: Yellowhead County, Alberta
- Coordinates: 53.6667°N 115.3833°W
- Primary inflows: Lobstick River, Poison Creek
- Primary outflows: Lobstick River
- Basin countries: Canada
- Surface area: 73 km^{2} (28 sq mi)
- Surface elevation: 792 m (2,598 ft)
- Settlements: Chip Lake

Chip Lake is a large lake in west-central Alberta. The Lobstick River flows through the lake. It in turn is a tributary of the Pembina River, which eventually flows into the Athabasca River.

Poison Creek flows into the north-west corner of Chip Lake. It drains Beta Lake and Sunset Lake. Prior to entering Chip Lake, the Lobstick River takes on Brule and Little Brule Creeks.

The Yellowhead Highway (Highway 16) passes along the south shore of Chip Lake. The small town of Wildwood can also be found on the lake's south shore.

== See also ==
- List of lakes in Alberta
