= Lobstick River =

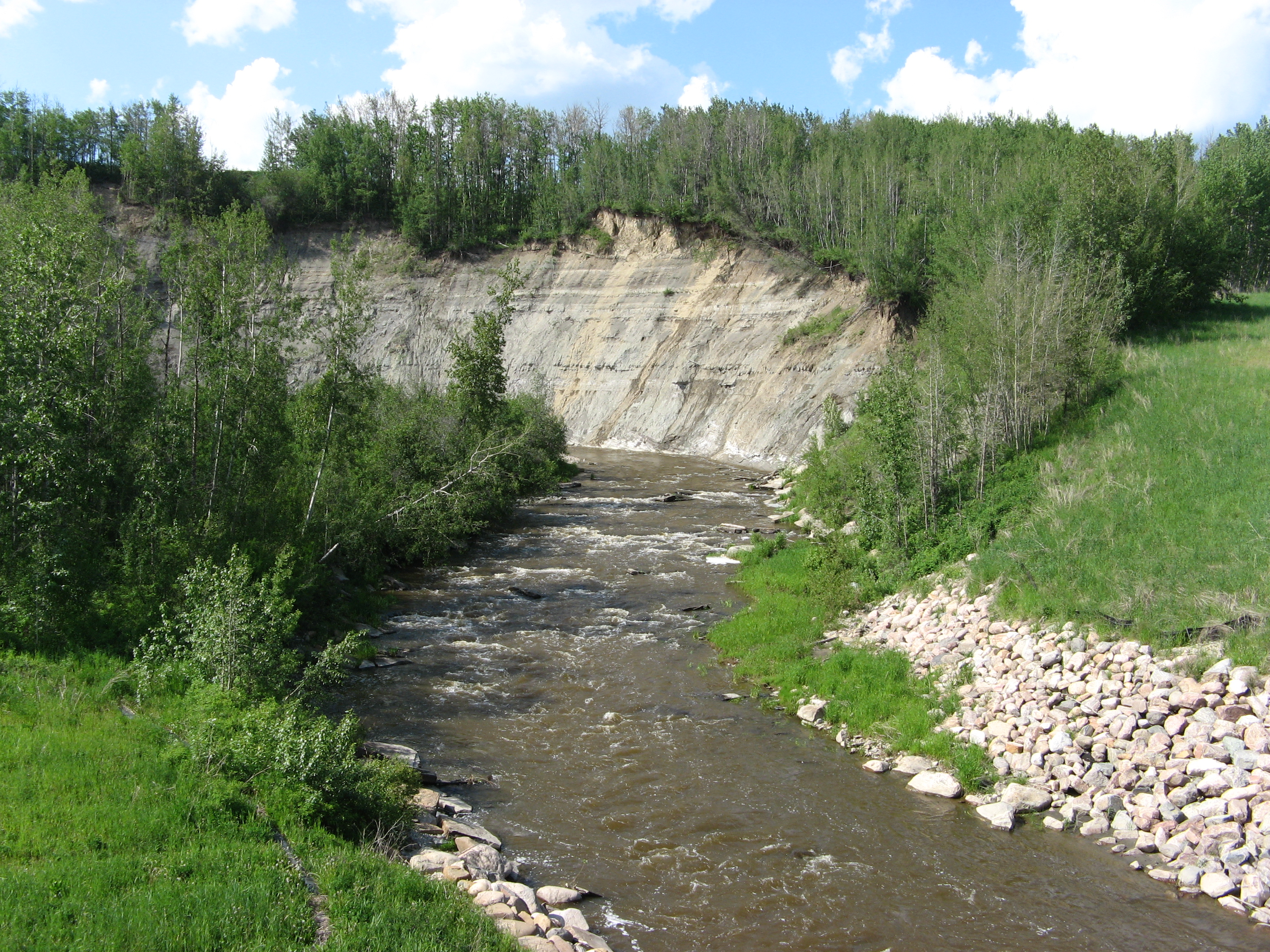
- Lobstick River before its confluence with the Pembina River

Location
- Country: Canada
- Province: Alberta

Physical characteristics
- Source
  - location: Lobstick River Headwaters
  - coordinates: 53.44556°N 115.91099°W
  - elevation: 1,035 m (3,396 ft)
- Mouth
  - location: Pembina River
  - coordinates: 53°36′33″N 114°59′59″W
  - elevation: 730 m (2,400 ft)

The Lobstick River is a small river in originating in west-central Alberta, Canada. It flows north from the foothills before entering Chip Lake. It then flows eastward through the community of Lobstick before joining the Pembina River, which in turn flows into the Athabasca River.

The Lobstick River took its name from the fur-trade era practice of creating lobsticks or lopsticks.

== Tributaries ==
From origins to mouth, the Lobstick River receives waters from the following tributaries:

- Brule Creek
- Little Brule Creek
- Chip Lake
  - Poison Creek

== See also ==
- List of Alberta rivers
