= Balwin, Edmonton =

Balwin
- Neighbourhood
- Location of Balwin in Edmonton
- Coordinates: 53.588°N 113.455°W
- Country: Canada
- Province: Alberta
- City: Edmonton
- Quadrant: NW
- Ward: tastawiyiniwak
- Sector: Mature area

Government
  - Administrative body: Edmonton City Council
  - Councillor: Karen Principe

Area
  - Total: 1.4 km^{2} (0.54 sq mi)
- Elevation: 668 m (2,192 ft)

Population (2012)
  - Total: 3,863
  - Density: 2,759.3/km^{2} (7,147/sq mi)
  - Change (2009–12): ▼−6.6%
  - Dwellings: 1,761

Balwin is a residential neighbourhood in north east Edmonton, Alberta, Canada. Originally part of North Edmonton, the area was annexed by the City of Edmonton in 1912.

According to the 2001 federal census, 6.5% of the residences in the neighbourhood were constructed prior to the end of World War II. However, most of the residential construction (76.5%) were built between 1946 and 1970. One out of every eight (12.4%) were built during the 1980s, and by 1981 residential construction was substantially complete.

The most common type of residence, according to the 2005 municipal census, is the single-family dwelling. These account for just under two out of every three (62%) of all residences in the neighbourhood. Another one in four (23%) are rented apartments with most of these in low-rise buildings with fewer than five stories. Approximately one in ten (9%) of residences are duplexes and one in twenty (5%) are row houses. Just under three out of every five (57%) of residences are owner-occupied with the remaining two out of three (43%) being rented.

The neighbourhood population is comparatively mobile. According to the 2005 municipal census, almost one in five (18.5%) of residents had moved within the previous 12 months. Another one in five (19.6%) had moved within the previous one to three years. Just under half (47.5%) had lived at the same address for five years or more.

The neighbourhood is bounded on the north by 132 Avenue, on the south by 127 Avenue and the Yellowhead Corridor, on the west by 82 Street, and on the east by 66 Street.

The community is represented by the Balwin community league, established in 1962, which maintains tennis courts, a community hall, a basketball court and an outdoor rink located at 129 Avenue and 74 Street.

== Demographics ==
In the City of Edmonton's 2012 municipal census, Balwin had a population of 3,863 living in 1,761 dwellings, a -6.6% change from its 2009 population of 4,138. With a land area of 1.4 km^{2} (0.54 sq mi), it had a population density of 2,759.3 people/km^{2} in 2012.

== Schools ==
Three schools are currently in operation within the neighbourhood.

- Edmonton Public School System
  - Balwin School
  - Princeton Elementary School
- Edmonton Catholic School System
  - St. Francis of Assisi Elementary School

A fourth school, North Edmonton Elementary School formerly of Edmonton Public Schools, closed due to low enrollment, and now hosts the Excel Society that houses brain injury and dementia patients.

Queen Elizabeth High School is located a west of the neighbourhood on 132 Avenue NW, while M.E. Lazerte High School is located to the north on 66 Street NW.

== Shopping and services ==
A commercial plaza is located at 127 Avenue NW and 82 Street NW. Londonderry Mall is located nearby to the north on 66 Street NW.

== See also ==
- Edmonton Federation of Community Leagues
