= Passburg, Alberta =

Passburg Police Flats
- Location within the Municipality of Crowsnest Pass Location within Alberta
- Coordinates: 49.557°N 114.340°W
- Country: Canada
- Province: Alberta
- Specialized municipality: Crowsnest Pass

Government
  - Type: Unincorporated
  - Governing body: Municipality of Crowsnest Pass Council
- Time zone: UTC−06:00 (Alberta Time)

Passburg is a ghost town in the Municipality of Crowsnest Pass in southern Alberta, Canada that was formerly a coal mining community. It is on Highway 3 (the Crowsnest Highway) approximately 130 km (81 mi) west of Lethbridge and 4 km (2.5 mi) southeast of Bellevue.

== History ==
Population history of Passburg
Year	Pop.	±%
1911	305	—
Source: Statistics Canada

In the 1880s, the Passburg area was originally a haven for cattle rustlers and their stolen stock destined for the United States due to availability of grass, multiple water sources, and shelter. In response, the North-West Mounted Police established a post in the area, which then became known as Police Flats.

William Hamilton founded the Leitch Collieries Ltd. Coal Company, also known as the Leitch Collieries Coal and Coke Company, in the Police Flats area in 1907. The first mine was developed at Byron Creek while the second mine was developed at Police Flats in 1909. Above ground infrastructure to support mining activity included 101 coke ovens, a wooden washery that was 27 m (89 ft) in height, and a tipple that could process 1,000 to 2,000 tons of coal on a daily basis.

A subdivision plan for the Passburg townsite was surveyed in August 1907. The townsite, which was a kilometre west of the second mine, was intended to house the miners and their families. The opening of a general store, another store, a bank, a hotel, a doctor's office, church, and meat market soon followed along with numerous homes. Passburg's post office opened in one of its stores on June 1, 1908. A sandstone power house was built at the second mine that began producing electricity for the townsite in 1910. By the 1911 Census of Canada, the townsite grew to a population of 305.

Strikes at Leitch Collieries occurred in 1909 and 1911. The Great War weakened coal prices and prevented agreements to supply product to the United States, England, and the Balkans. Relationships became strained with its financing banks and the Canadian Pacific Railway, which was both a customer and transporter of Leitch Collieries' products. The company stopped production in 1915 and placed its assets up for sale. After the death of a prospective buyer later in 1915, Leitch Collieries was unable to finance a restart of production despite the demand generated by the war. The company sold off its assets in 1919.

Passburg's post office closed in 1938. The Leitch Collieries Provincial Historic Site was designated by the Government of Alberta in 1983.

== Attractions ==
The Leitch Collieries Provincial Historic Site is located north of Highway 3 (the Crowsnest Highway) east of East Hillcrest Drive between Burmis to the east and Bellevue to the northwest. The site is self-guided from Labour Day to mid-May while interpretive staff lead tours during the balance of the year.

== Notable people ==
William Kovach, a member of the Legislative Assembly of Alberta between 1948 and 1966, was born in Passburg.

== See also ==
- Blairmore, Alberta
- Coleman, Alberta
- Frank, Alberta
- Hillcrest, Alberta
- Lille, Alberta
