= Bellevue mine disaster =

Mine disaster in Alberta, Canada

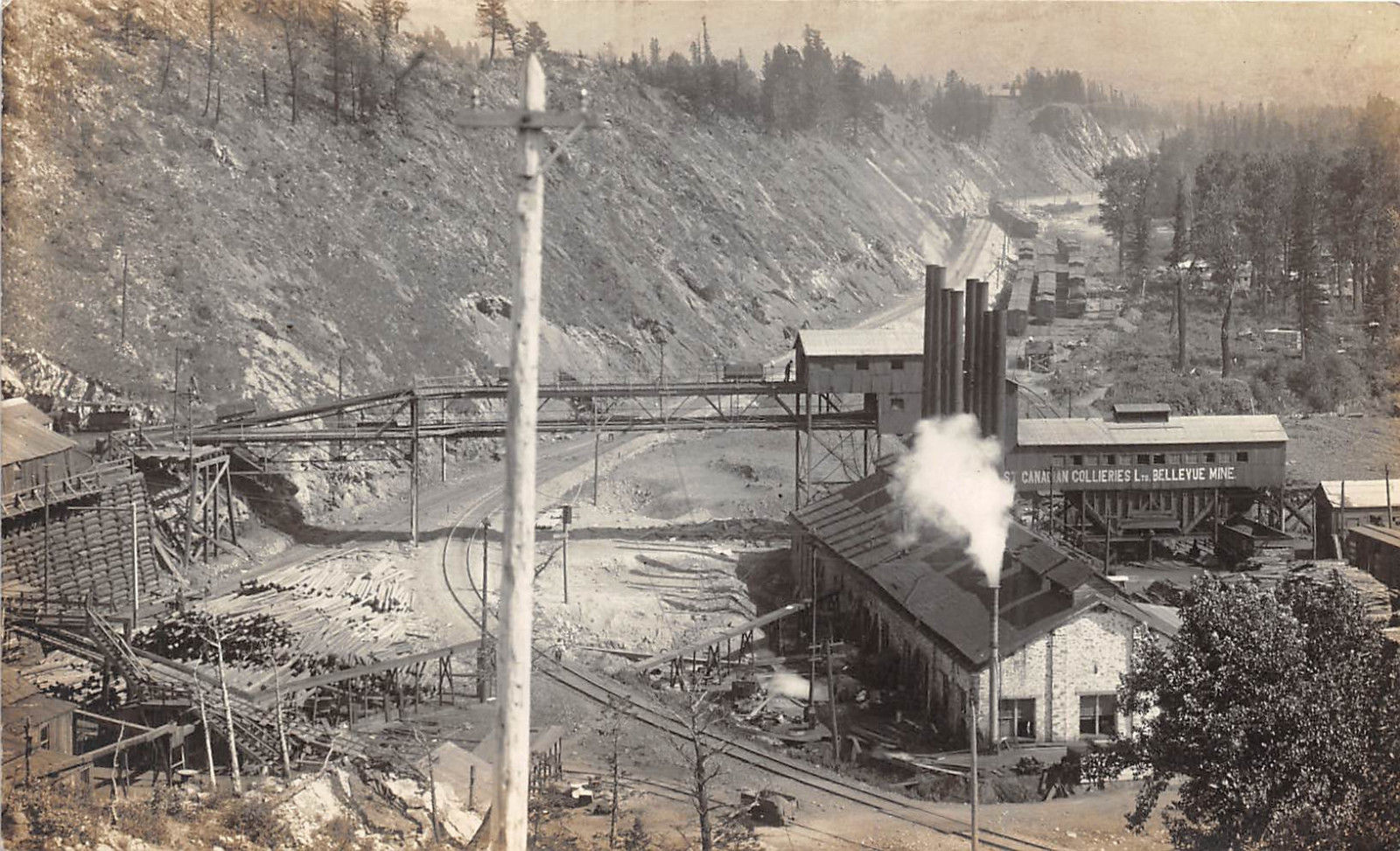
- Undated photo of the West Canadian Collieries No. 1 Mine (also known as the Bellevue No. 1 Mine) while still in operation
- Date: 10 December 1910 (115 years ago)
- Time: 18:30 MST
- Location: Bellevue, Alberta; 49.576978°N 114.364830°W
- Cause: Gas explosion caused by a cave-in
- Outcome: 30 workers killed and 1 rescuer
- Deaths: 31

On 10 December 1910, an explosion occurred underground in the West Canadian Collieries No. 1 Mine in the Crowsnest Pass community of Bellevue, Alberta. The explosion pushed all of the air out of the mine and filled it with afterdamp, a deadly gas that is a mixture of Carbon dioxide and Carbon monoxide, killing 30 of the 42 workers present at the time, as well as one rescue worker. The explosion was the first mining disaster in Alberta's history, and led to several changes in coal mining in the Crowsnest Pass. The event was soon overshadowed by the nearby Hillcrest mine disaster four years later, which killed 189 and is Canada's worst mining disaster to date.

== Background ==
The West Canadian Collieries No. 1 Mine was established by West Canadian Collieries Limited in 1903 and led to the founding of the village of Bellevue. The mine mainly employed immigrants, with large numbers of workers coming from Poland, Sweden, Italy, Ukraine, and the British Isles.

== Lead up to explosion ==
In documents later revealed to the Alberta Legislature, a routine inspection report filed on 4 March 1910, by District Mines Inspector Elijah Heathcote at the Bellevue No. 1 Mine found that the Coal Mines Act had been infringed in multiple places, especially relating to the handling of explosives. In a response, Chief Provincial Mine Inspector John T. Stirling indicated that there had been past issues with enforcing the Coal Mines Act at the Bellevue No. 1 Mine. Two days later, Stirling received a telegram from James Burke, secretary of the miners' union, saying that the colliery was poorly ventilated and full of gas. Stirling ordered Heathcote to Bellevue to investigate. During his inspection, Heathcote found gas buildups in multiple rooms and ordered that no further work be done until the gas had been cleared away. Within the same month, West Canadian was charged $40 for the death of Michel Angelo Valpioia in the mine, who was found to have been working at the mine since he was below the age of 12 and who died while under the age of 16. On 31 October, the mine was rocked by a large explosion. Luckily it was a holiday and no one was working at the time. Upon inspecting the Fire Boss's report books, Heathcote discovered that on 30 October, the ventilation fan had been stopped for 9 hours for repairs, allowing gas to accumulate throughout the mine, causing it to ignite when a cave-in happened on the 31st. This was not the first time that the ventilation fan had been stopped for an extended period of time, on the 29th, when it was found by Heathcote that miners had been in the mine while the fan was off for two hours. On 3 December 1910, the Miner's union sent a telegram to Stirling demanding that Heathcote be sent to Bellevue, as there was too much gas in the mine. When Heathcote arrived, he interviewed the mine manager J.W. Powell, who told him that the mine was gas free. When the fire boss John Anderson also stated that there was no gas in the mine, Heathcote approved for work to continue in the mine.

== Explosion ==
At 6:30 PM MST, during the night shift with 42 workers present, an explosion occurred in the mine trapping all of the men underground, and releasing toxic afterdamp into the air. The mine sent out a distress call, which was received by the closest rescue team in Hosmer, British Columbia who began the roughly six hour train ride to Bellevue. Mine managers John Powell and Frank Lewis and pit boss John Anderson attempted a rescue, but without breathing apparatus were quickly met with noxious afterdamp and could not go further. When the rescue crew from Hosmer arrived with Draeger breathing apparatuses, workers at the mine and local townspeople also participated in the rescue. Upon entering the mine, rescuers soon discovered a room with the bodies of 20 miners. During the rescue, 36 year-old Fred Alderson from the Hosmer rescue team also died after giving his breathing apparatus to one of the miners. Throughout the night and into the following Saturday, bodies were retrieved from the mine, being put in the mine's wash house to be identified by relatives. By noon all of the 12 survivors had been accounted for, and no more bodies remained in the mine. During the following inquest, the exact cause of the explosion was never determined, with the most likely possibility being that a cave-in between the 76 and 78 chutes either ignited gas already in the mine from 3 December, or revealed a pocket of gas, sucking it downward with the falling rocks and igniting it.

== Victims ==
Those who died were:

- Fred Alderson, 36, Rescuer
- John Basso, 19, Loader
- Albert Beigun, 32, Loader
- Josyf Beigun, 53, Loader
- John Bodner, 29, Timberpacker
- Joe Bonato, 37, Miner
- Sebastiano D'Ercole, 30, Miner
- John Doskoc, 30, Timberpacker
- Jakob Dravinski, 35, Miner
- Mike Gera, 40, Miner
- Peter Gera, 45, Miner
- Justyn Kindiatyrzyn, 42, Timberpacker
- Mike Korman, 31, Miner
- Vaino Kunsinen, 24, Bratticeman
- Charles Lehti, 43, Miner
- Antonio Martini, 23, Miner
- August Ountok, 27, Miner
- Peter Paul, 25, Miner
- Antonio Quintilio, 38, Miner
- Masimino Quintilio, 31, Miner
- Frank Roberts, 35, Loader
- Gustave Robo, 32, Miner
- Andrew Saari, 50, Tracklayer
- Samuel Simmette, 30, Miner
- Mykuloy Srezupok, 27, Miner
- Herman Teppo, 32, Pit boss
- Antonio Tripoti, Miner
- Bruno Tripoti, 35, Miner
- John Ulivinen, 28, Miner
- Tom Ulivinen, Miner
- Hans Wellerg, 50, Miner

== Aftermath and inquest ==
On 13 December, 21 of the victims were buried at the Blairmore Town Cemetery in nearby Blairmore. Flags in Bellevue were lowered to half mast, and there was a long procession featuring two marching bands. People came to pay their respects from all of the settlements in the pass, and the crowd was estimated to be one thousand strong. An inquest on the disaster started on 4 January 1911. None of the correspondence between the company the mines inspectors were entered into evidence due to them being "confidential and privileged" according to Chief Provincial Mine Inspector John T. Stirling. Due to this, jury deliberation was based entirely on eyewitness testimony. The inquest continued for nine days, often extending into the nighttime. Miners' Union secretary James Burke alleged that miners had reported gas in the mine six days earlier, and that miners were afraid to complain about gas present in the mine because they feared dismissal. Chief Inspector Stirling refused to answer as to why he had not ordered a thorough post-explosion examination of the mine. When called to the stand, District Mines Inspector Heathcote said that he approved the condition of the mine on the 3rd because he accepted the word of the mine manager and fireboss that the mine was gas free. On the last day of the inquest, former fire boss John Oliphant testified that the company's mine plans were incorrect, because in one place, a large portion of the coal seam had not been extracted, and a large amount of gas was escaping into the mine from here. Other fire bosses confirmed his testimony. On 15 January, at midnight, the jury reached a verdict. They recommended that Draeger breathing apparatuses be station in the Crowsnest Pass, and also suggested putting telephones in the underground mines. Despite the jury stating "we consider that negligence is in evidence on the part of operators and miners", no charges were ever brought on anyone for the disaster. A year later in 1912, MLA Charles M. O'Brien of the Socialist Party of Canada for Rocky Mountain introduced a motion into legislature to censure the government for its failure to prosecute in the inquest. Speaking for 7 hours, O'Brien detailed the correspondence that had not been entered as evidence during the inquest.

== Legacy ==
Being the first mining disaster in Alberta's history, the disaster played a large role in furthering safety in mining in Alberta. Alberta's first mine rescue station was established in Blairmore in 1911 in response to the disaster. This mine rescue station also featured Alberta's first mine rescue car, a railway car which housed twelve men and was able to quickly travel to a rescue site. Initially, the disaster seemed to have a profound effect on the village of Bellevue, with it leaving 20 widows and 44 orphaned children. The event was called "a day never to be forgotten in Blairmore", however the mine disaster in Hillcrest Mines, located just across the Crowsnest River from Bellevue, four years later in 1914 quickly overshadowed the disaster due to its much higher death toll of 189 which remains to this day the worst mining disaster in Canada. If the explosion in the Bellevue No. 1 Mine had occurred only slightly earlier during the day shift when the mine had over 200 workers present, it is possible that the disaster would have surpassed the Hillcrest Mine disaster in fatalities. Despite the accident, the mine remained open until the switch from steam power to diesel during the 1960s forced its closure. Today, the underground mine is open for tours and is a popular tourist attraction in Bellevue.

== See also ==
- Hillcrest mine disaster
- Senghenydd colliery disaster
- Smith Mine disaster
- Nanaimo mine explosion
- 1903 Frank slide
- List of disasters in Canada by death toll
- Coal in Alberta
