= Crowsnest Pass =

Mountain pass in Alberta and British Columbia, Canada

- Col du Nid-de-Corbeau (French)
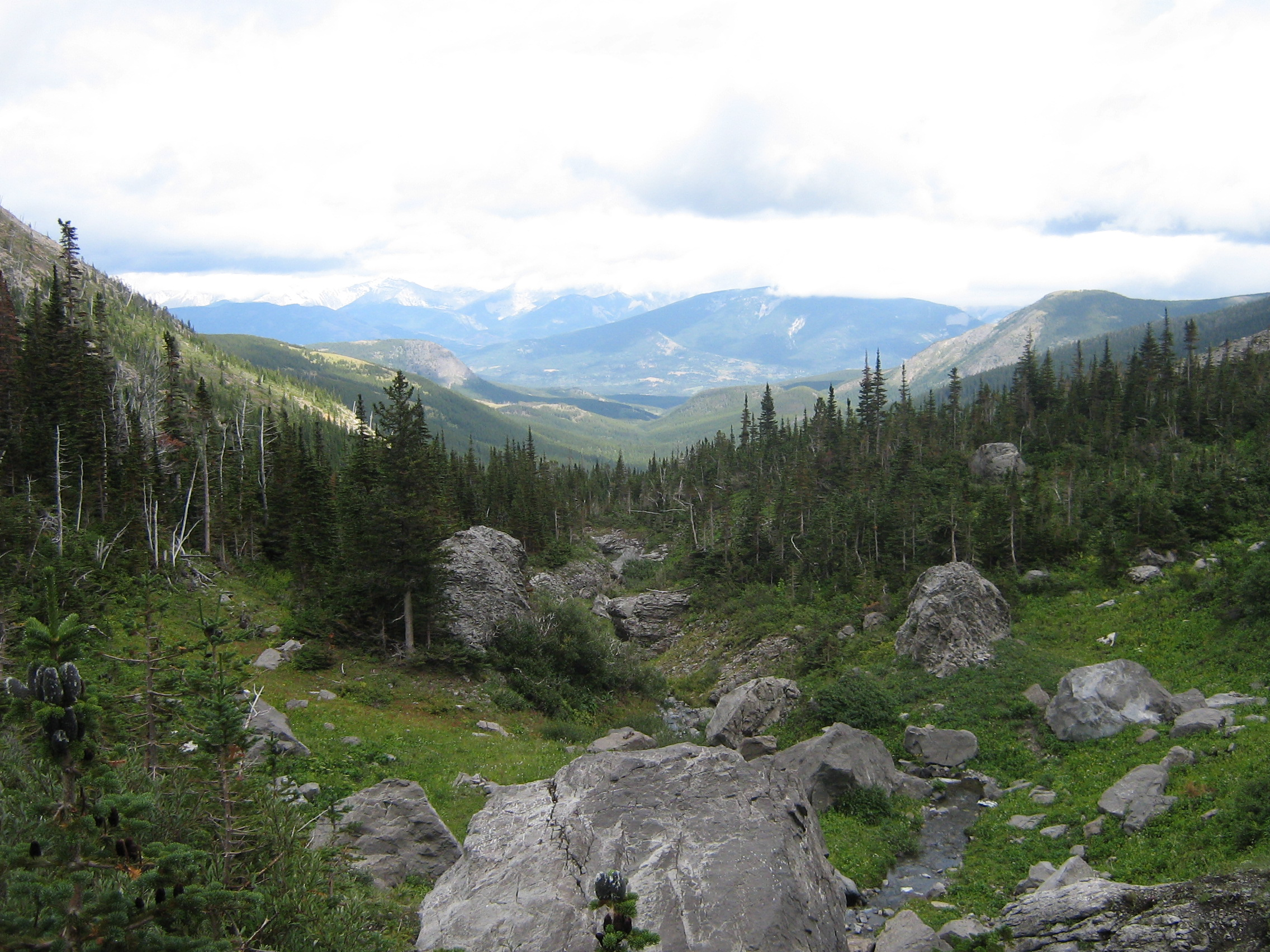

- Location within Alberta Location within British Columbia
- Elevation: 1,358 metres (4,455 ft)
- Traversed by: Crowsnest Highway; Canadian Pacific Railway

Third Approach
- Location: Crowsnest Pass, Alberta / Sparwood, British Columbia, Canada
- Range: Canadian Rockies
- Coordinates: 49°37′57″N 114°41′33″W
- Topo map: NTS 82G10 Crowsnest

Crowsnest Pass (sometimes referred to as Crow's Nest Pass, French: col du Nid-de-Corbeau) is a low mountain pass across the Continental Divide of the Canadian Rockies on the Alberta–British Columbia border.

== Geography ==
The pass is located in southeast British Columbia and southwest Alberta, and is the southernmost rail and highway route through the Canadian Rockies. It is the lowest-elevation mountain pass in Canada south of the Yellowhead Pass (1,130 m or 3,710 ft); the other major passes, which are higher, being Kicking Horse Pass (1,640 m or 5,380 ft), Howse Pass (1,530 m or 5,020 ft) and Vermilion Pass (1,680 m or 5,510 ft).

Crowsnest Pass comprises a valley running east–west through Crowsnest Ridge. On the Alberta side, the Crowsnest River flows east from Crowsnest Lake, eventually draining into the Oldman River and ultimately reaching Hudson Bay via the Nelson River. Summit Lake on the British Columbia side drains via three intermediary creeks into the Elk River, which feeds into the Kootenay River, and finally into the Columbia River to the Pacific.

== Transportation ==
Before the arrival of Europeans, Indigenous people used this major breach through the Front Ranges for seasonal migrations, and also for trade between mountain and plains cultures.

The Canadian Pacific Railway (CPR) built the Crowsnest Route line from Lethbridge, Alberta, to Kootenay Landing, British Columbia, through the Crowsnest Pass between 1897 and 1898. This line was built primarily to access mineral-rich southeastern BC via an all-Canadian rail route, and to assert Canadian (and CPR) sovereignty in an area that U.S. railroads were beginning to build into. It also opened up coal deposits in the Crowsnest and Elk River valleys, which were important to mineral smelting operations and assisted the CPR in its conversion of locomotives from wood to coal. The CPR sought and received construction funding from the federal government, partially in exchange for a freight subsidy on prairie farm exports and equipment imports which came to be called the "Crow's Nest Pass Agreement".

"The Crow Rate", as the subsidy agreement came to be referred to, was eventually extended from CPR's Crowsnest Pass railway line to apply to all railway lines in western Canada, regardless of corporate ownership or geography, creating artificially low freight rates for grain shipments through the Great Lakes ports. The rate also correspondingly limited industrial growth in the western provinces as it was cheaper to produce items in eastern Canada and ship them west under the Crow Rate. This subsidy was finally abolished in 1995.

The first motor vehicle to cross the Canadian Rockies did so via Phillipps Pass in 1910, about 1 km north of Crowsnest Pass, and in 1917 a road was blasted around the shores of Crowsnest Lake and across Crowsnest Pass, renamed Interprovincial Highway Three in 1932. It is also known as the Crowsnest Highway.

On August 7, 1919, Captain Ernest Hoy flew a Curtiss JN-4 "Jenny" through Crowsnest Pass, the first flight across the Canadian Rockies.

== Natural resources ==
The Crowsnest Pass area on both sides of the provincial boundary is rich in coal deposits, which were quickly developed after completion of the rail line. All the mines on the Alberta side were closed by the end of the 20th century as cheaper and safer open-pit mines opened on the British Columbia side of the pass. Some logging and oil and gas exploitation also occur in the area and a sulphur plant has been in operation there for several years. Tourism based on the natural and historical resources of the area remains underdeveloped but is slowly growing. The area hosts the world-class Sinister 7 Ultra Marathon, a 161-kilometre foot race that winds through the mountains around the community. Crowsnest Pass also has a local ski hill, Pass Powderkeg, and an outdoor pool.

== History ==
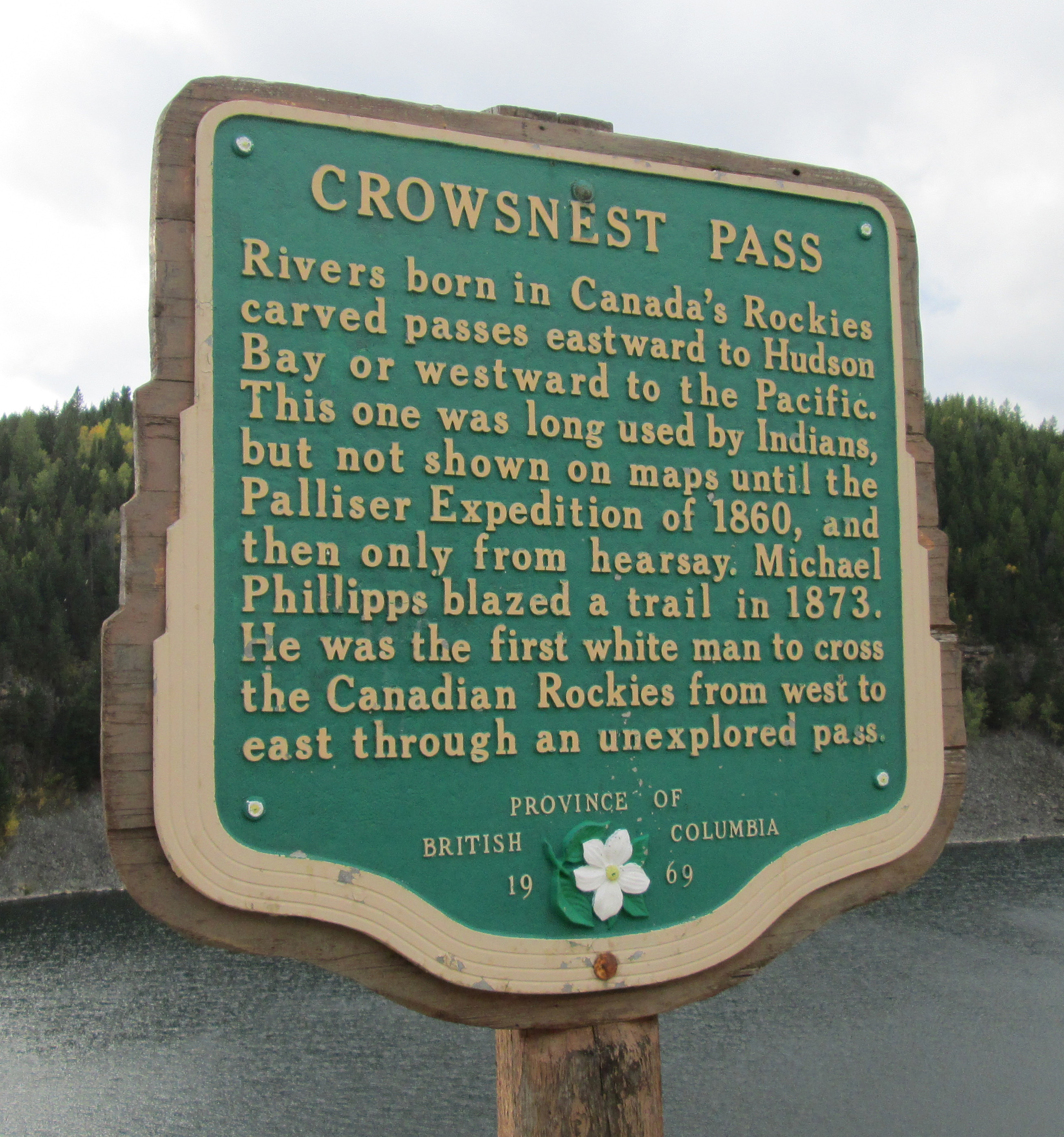
Crowsnest Pass Highway 3. First Nations long used the Crowsnest Pass but it was not shown on maps until the Palliser Expedition of 1860.

- The Crowsnest Pass is the richest archaeological zone in the Canadian Rockies. The oldest relics are stone tools found on a rock ridge outside Frank, Alberta, from the Clovis culture, 11,000 years before present. Other sites include chert quarries on the Livingstone ridge dating back to 1000 BC.
- 1800: Members of David Thompson expedition avoid entering the pass.
- ca. 1850: Crow Indians dispersed from area by Blackfoot Confederacy.
- 1873: Michael Phillipps (Hudson's Bay Company) traverses pass, reports coal deposits.
- 1877: The First Nations cede their title in the eastern portion of the pass with Treaty 7. The western portion in British Columbia is unceded.
- 1878: Government survey by George Dawson.
- 1881: first surveys by Canadian Pacific Railway.
- 1897: CPR enters into farm export subsidy agreement for freight rates in exchange for financing of the railway line between Lethbridge, Alberta, and Nelson, BC. Crow's Nest Pass Coal Company commences operations in British Columbia.
- 1898: CPR opens the railway line, 10th siding (later Blairmore, Alberta) established. Settlement of Fernie, British Columbia, established.
- 1900: the Frank Mine opens and the new town of Frank, Alberta, is established. Other coal mines and towns spring up between 1900 and 1919.
- 1902: explosion at Coal Creek mine kills 128 men.
- 1903: the cataclysmic Frank Slide occurs on the north slope of Turtle Mountain; 82 million tonnes of limestone crash down and partially bury the town of Frank, killing approximately 90 of the town's 600 residents.
- 1904: Fernie, British Columbia, incorporates.
- 1908: forest fire destroys Fernie (pop: 6000), which soon rebuilds.
- 1914: an explosion in the mine at Hillcrest kills 189 men, Canada's worst mine disaster.
- 1916–1923: Prohibition in Alberta; "rum-running" across the provincial boundary.
- 1920: Train robbery and shootout at Bellevue Cafe.
- 1923: 'Emperor Pic' (Emilio Picariello) and Florence Lassandro hanged for shooting a police constable; first woman hanged in Alberta.
- 1932: The portion of the Red Trail through the Frank Slide is realigned as a Great Depression project and renamed Interprovincial Highway 3.
- 1946: An RCAF DC-3 Dakota crashes into a mountain, killing all seven people on board.
- 1966: Communities of Michel, Natal, and Sparwood amalgamate into the District Municipality of Sparwood, British Columbia.
- 1979: Communities of Coleman, Blairmore, Bellevue, Hillcrest, and Frank amalgamate to form the Municipality of Crowsnest Pass, Alberta.
- 2017: The Ktunaxa Nation and the Crown move to Stage 5 negotiations of a treaty that affects the western portion of Crowsnest Pass

== Gallery ==
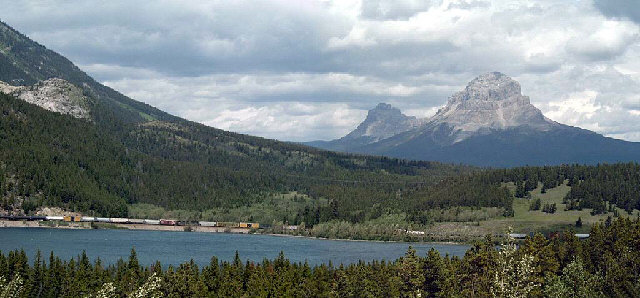
Crowsnest Lake, near the summit of the Crowsnest Pass, looking east toward Crowsnest Mountain.

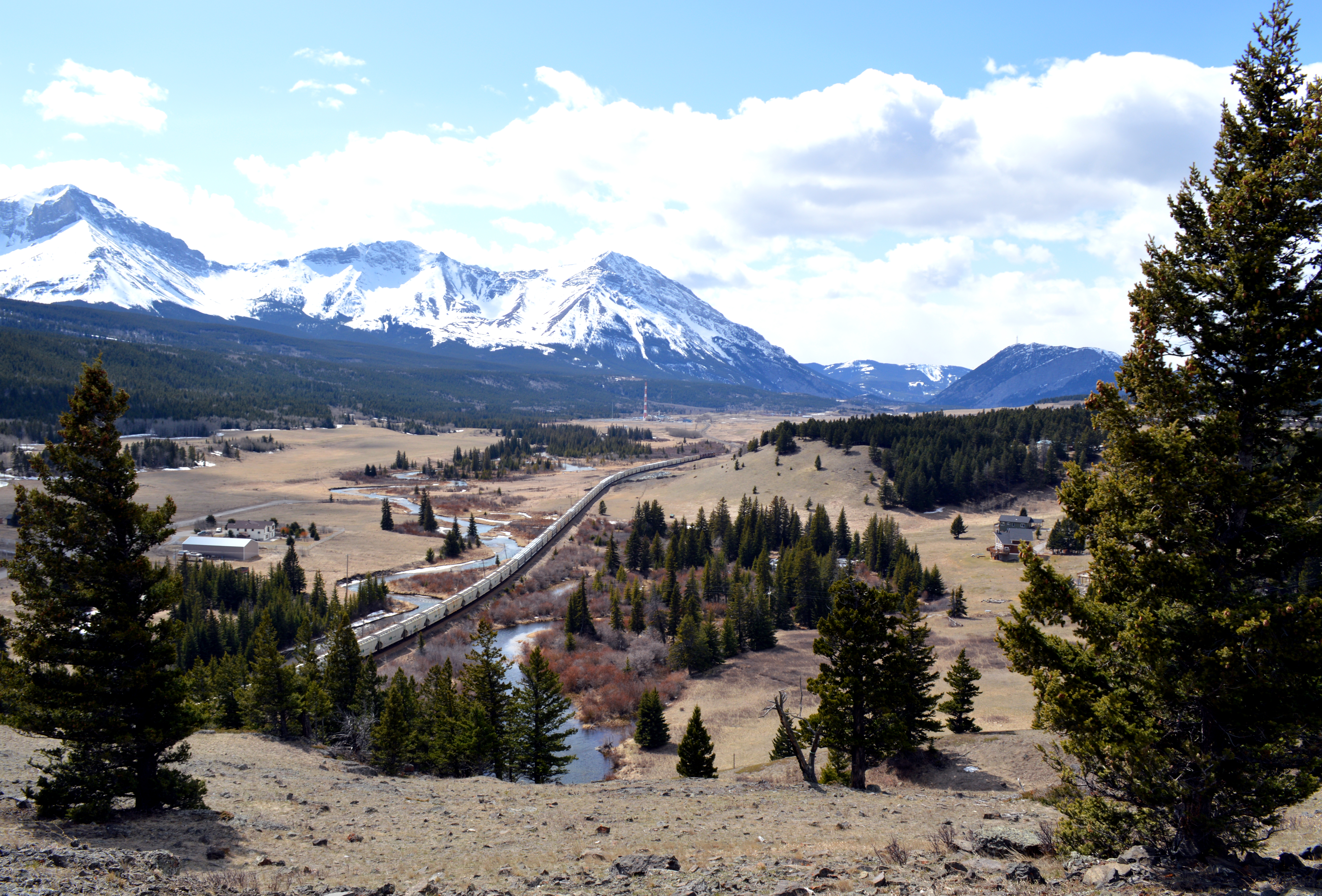
A train heads west toward the summit of the Crowsnest Pass from Coleman, Alberta.

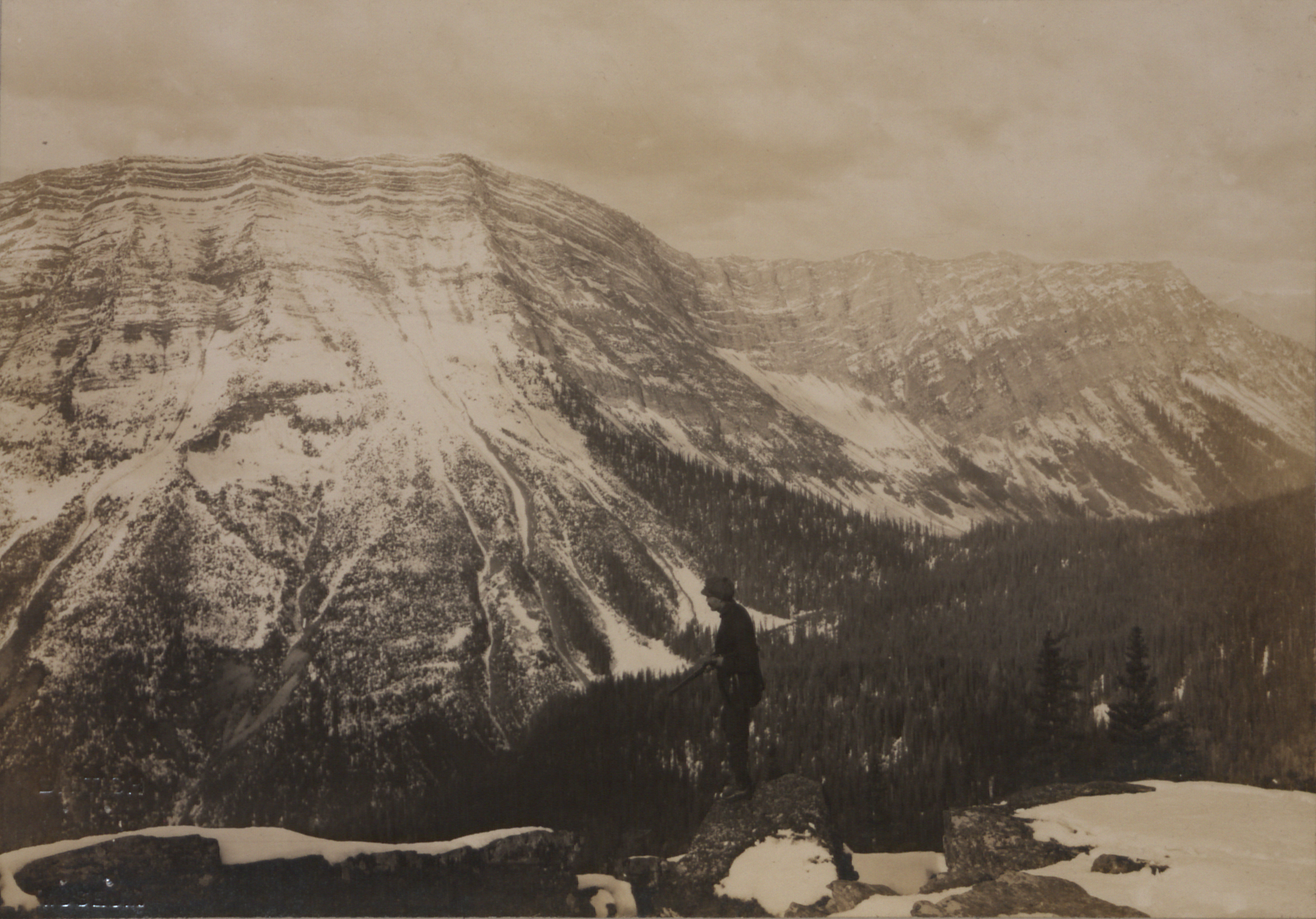
Goat Mountain from the summit of Crown Mountain, Crowsnest Pass, 1908.

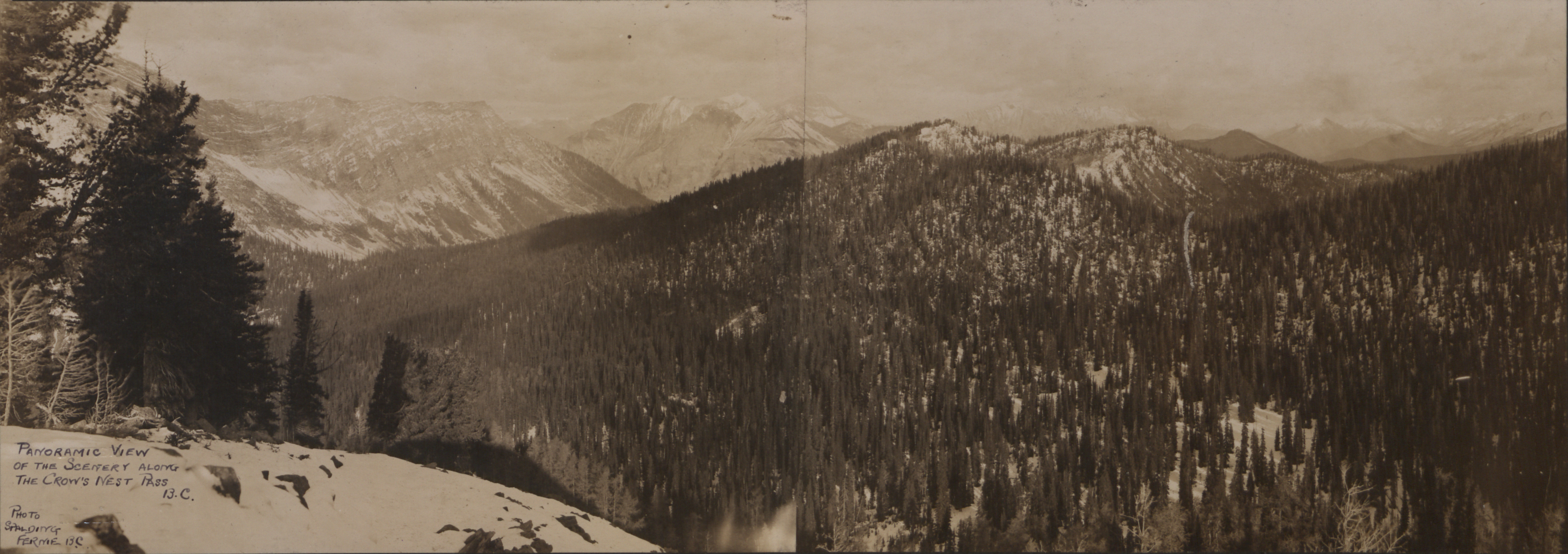
Panoramic view of scenery in the Crowsnest, 1908.

== See also ==
- List of Rocky Mountain passes on the continental divide

== Bibliography ==
- Crowsnest and Its People, Crowsnest Pass Historical Society, 1979.
- Crowsnest and Its People Millennium Edition, Crowsnest Pass Historical Society, 2000.
