= Tent Mountain =

Mountain in Alberta and British Columbia, Canada

- Location within Alberta Location within British Columbia Location within Canada

Highest point
- Elevation: 2,210 m (7,250 ft)
- Prominence: 500 m (1,600 ft)
- Listing: Mountains of Alberta; Mountains of British Columbia
- Coordinates: 49°33′26″N 114°42′31″W

Geography
- Country: Canada
- Provinces: Alberta and British Columbia
- District: Kootenay Land District
- Topo map: NTS 82G10 Crowsnest

Tent Mountain is located on the border of Alberta and British Columbia on the Continental Divide. It was named in 1911 by Morrison P. Bridgland.

Tent Mountain hosts a legacy mountaintop removal coal mine, which closed in 1983. Approximately half of the "top" of Tent Mountain was removed to access the coal creating a large open-pit at the top of the mountain. The waste rock was left in a pile along the side of the mountain next to the open-pit. In 2021, a proposal was received to restart mining at the top of Tent Mountain. The proposal has since been withdrawn.

A recent study of water quality both within the mine area and in rivers draining the mine revealed elevated concentrations of selenium. Selenium concentrations downstream of Tent Mountain reached 185 μg/L in a pond below the mine spoil pile, and up to 23 μg/L in Crowsnest Creek, which drains the pond and the mine property. Crowsnest Creek in turn flows into Crowsnest Lake.

== See also ==
- List of peaks on the Alberta–British Columbia border
