= Hillcrest, Alberta =

Hillcrest
- Former hamlet
- Location within the Municipality of Crowsnest Pass Location within Alberta
- Coordinates: 49.569°N 114.377°W
- Country: Canada
- Province: Alberta
- Specialized municipality: Crowsnest Pass

Government
  - Type: Unincorporated
  - Governing body: Municipality of Crowsnest Pass Council

Area (2021)
  - Land: 0.51 km^{2} (0.20 sq mi)

Population (2021)
  - Total: 640
  - Density: 1,251.7/km^{2} (3,242/sq mi)
- Time zone: UTC−06:00 (Alberta Time)

Hillcrest, also known as Hillcrest Mines, is an urban community in the Rocky Mountains within the Municipality of Crowsnest Pass in southwest Alberta, Canada. It was once a hamlet under the jurisdiction of Improvement District (ID) No. 5 prior to 1979 when the former ID No. 5 amalgamated with four other municipalities to form Crowsnest Pass.

== History ==
Population history of Hillcrest
Year	Pop.	±%
1941	783	—
1951	892	+13.9%
1956	594	−33.4%
1961	618	+4.0%
1966	551	−10.8%
1971	613	+11.3%
1976	653	+6.5%
2006	564	−13.6%
2016	597	+5.9%
2021	640	+7.2%
Source: Statistics Canada

Hillcrest was named after Charles Plummer Hill, an early coal prospector and entrepreneur who also founded Porthill, Idaho. Hill grew up and was educated in Seaford, Delaware before moving northwest. The Hillcrest Coal and Coke Company, incorporated on January 31, 1905, began constructing the community the same year, and the Canadian Pacific Railway soon built a spur, for transporting coal from the Hillcrest Mine, and a train station. Hillcrest soon grew to a population of about 1,000. The post office opened in 1907 with Mr. Hill as the postmaster.

Although the mine was successful, and considered one of the safest in the region, an underground explosion in 1914 (Canada's worst mine disaster) killed 189 people — almost twenty percent of the community's population and half the mine's workforce. A further explosion in 1926 killed two others. After the mine closed in 1939, Hillcrest experienced a period of economic decline.

In 1979, the former I.D. No. 5, which included the former hamlet of Hillcrest, amalgamated with Bellevue, Blairmore, Coleman and Frank to form the Municipality of Crowsnest Pass.

== Demographics ==
In the 2021 Census of Population conducted by Statistics Canada, Hillcrest had a population of 640 living in 324 of its 373 total private dwellings, a change of 7.2% from its 2016 population of 597. With a land area of 0.51 km^{2} (0.20 sq mi), it had a population density of 1,254.9/km^{2} (3,250.2/sq mi) in 2021.

== See also ==
- List of communities in Alberta
- List of designated places in Alberta
