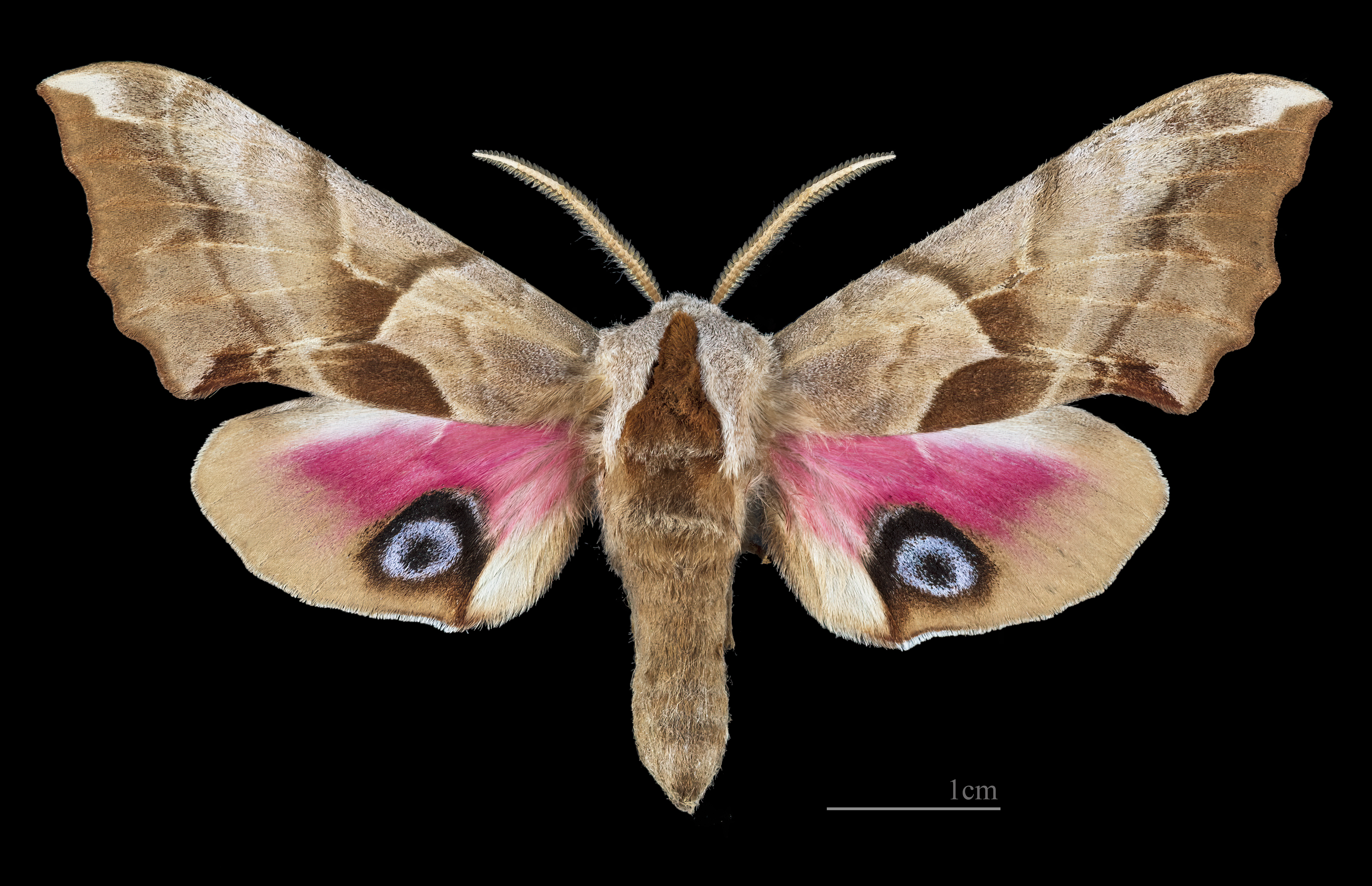
- Smerinthus ophthalmica male dorsal
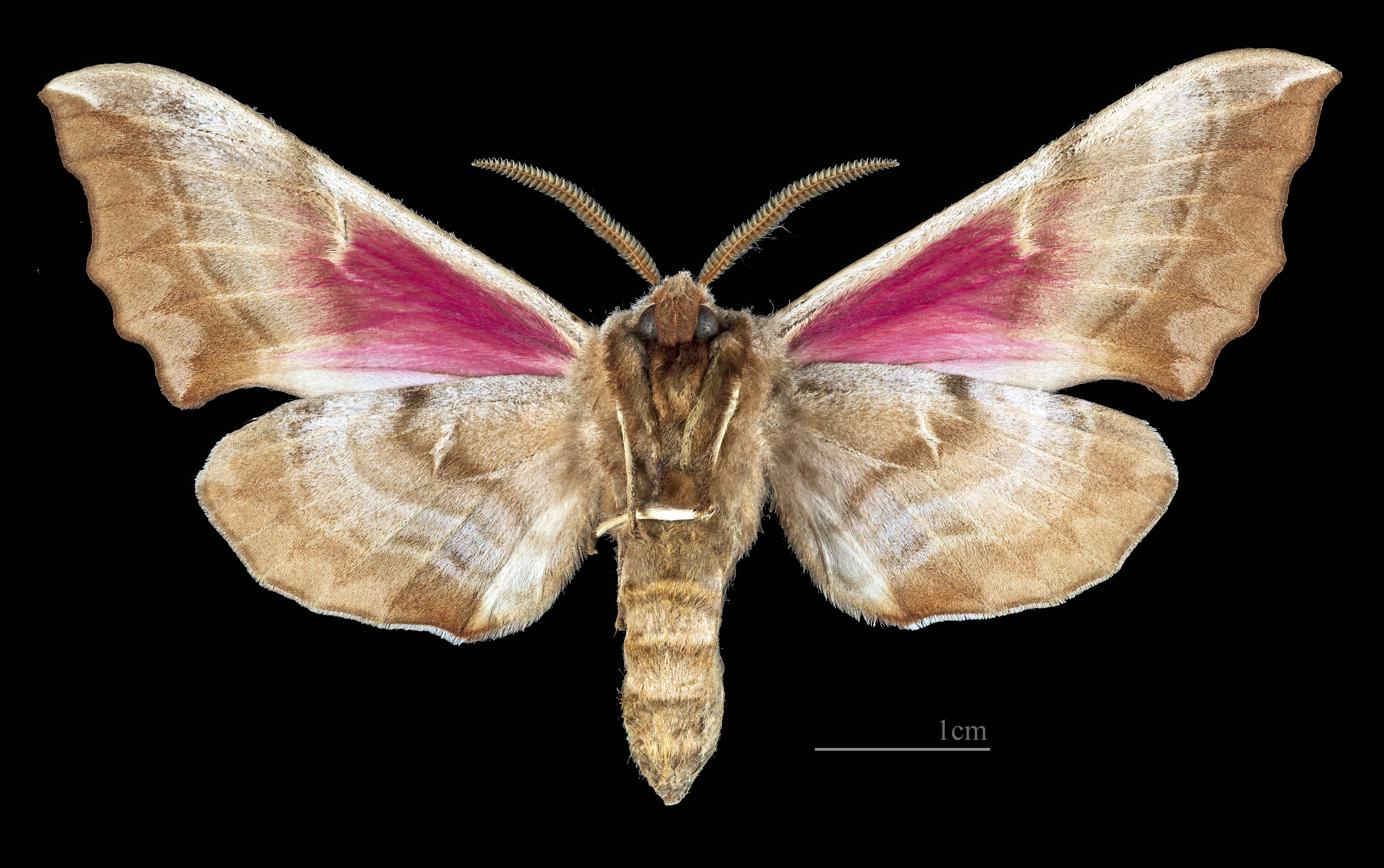
- Smerinthus ophthalmica male ventral

Scientific classification
- Kingdom: Animalia
- Phylum: Arthropoda
- Clade: Pancrustacea
- Class: Insecta
- Order: Lepidoptera
- Family: Sphingidae
- Genus: Smerinthus
- Species: S. ophthalmica

Binomial name
- Smerinthus ophthalmica Boisduval, 1855

= Smerinthus ophthalmica =

Species of moth

Western eyed sphinx in Montana

Smerinthus ophthalmica is a moth of the family Sphingidae. It was described by Jean Baptiste Boisduval in 1855 . It is found in western North America from California to Alberta.

== Taxonomy ==
The populations of Smerinthus cerisyi were divided into two species by Pohl, Anweiler, Schmidt and Kondla in 2010. The southern prairie-mountain (Crowsnest Pass southward) populations are now known as S. ophthalmica (type locality: San Francisco, California) and the boreal-mountain populations as S. cerisyi (type locality: North America, limited to New York State). Rothschild and Jordan revised ophthalmica to a subspecies of S. cerisyi in 1903, and Hodges treated it as a synonym of S. cerisyi in 1971, which has been generally followed since, with the exception of Eitschberger, who raised three taxa (astarte, vancouverensis and ophthalmica) from synonymy under S. cerisyi in 2002.

These taxonomic changes pertaining to North American taxa were countered by Tuttle in 2007. S. ophthalmica however, is distinguished by a pale brown phenotype prevalent in prairie populations, a less scalloped margin on the forewing, less scalloped and smoother postmedian lines on the forewing, a sharper angle of the antemedian line, and narrower serrations of the male antennae, as well as surprisingly large mitochondrial DNA divergence.

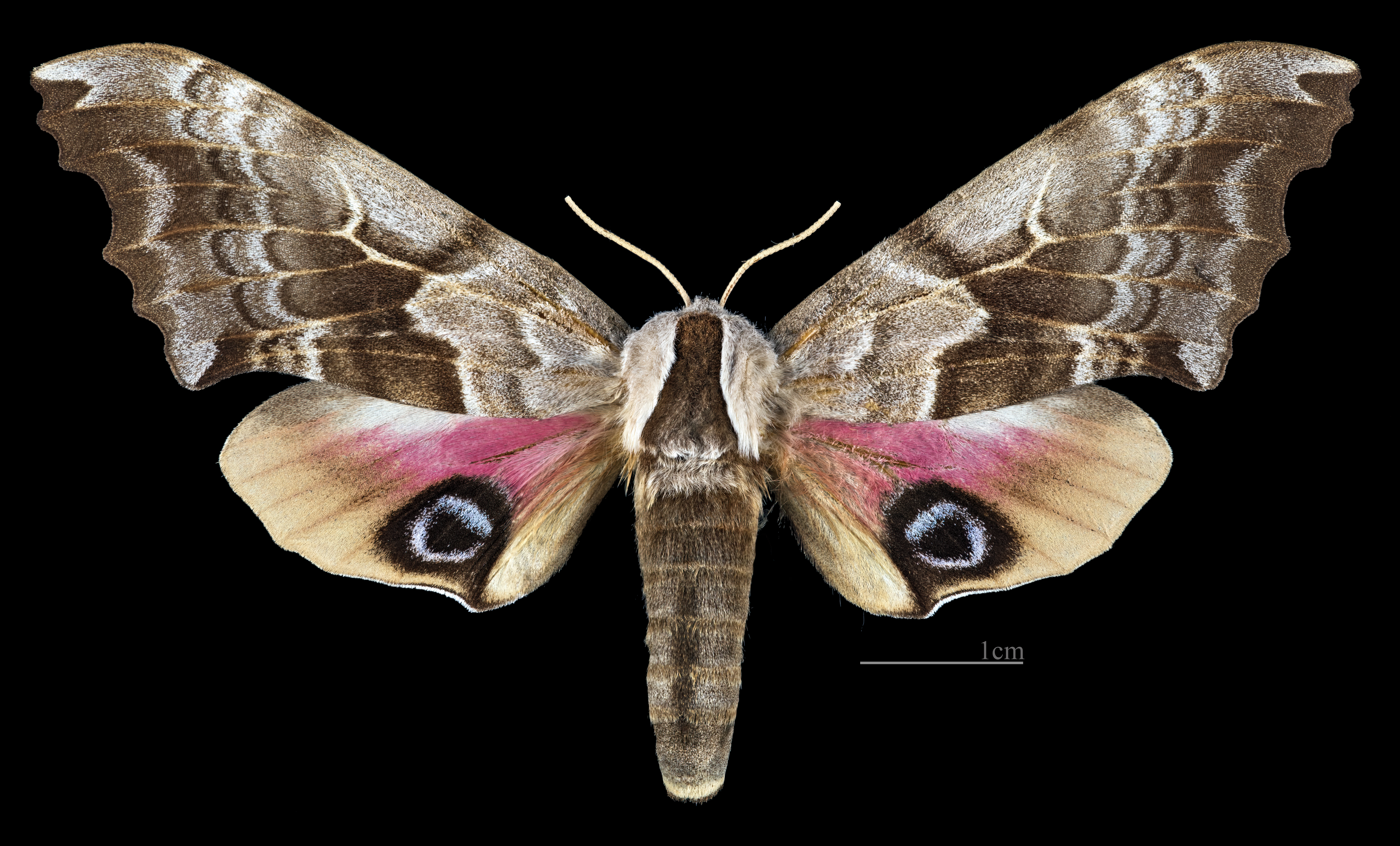
Female dorsal

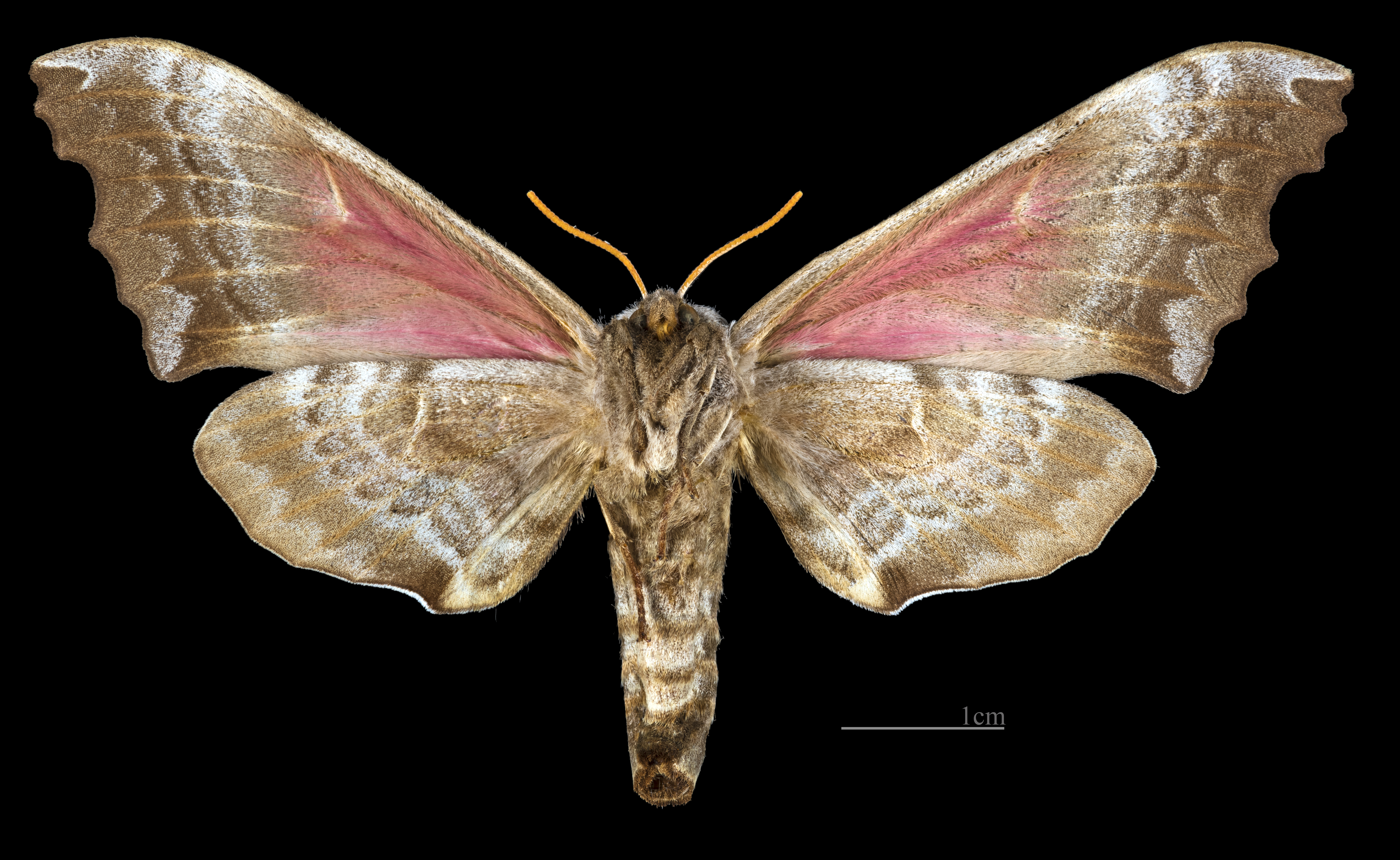
Female ventral
