= Emilio Picariello =

Italian-Canadian bootlegger and murderer

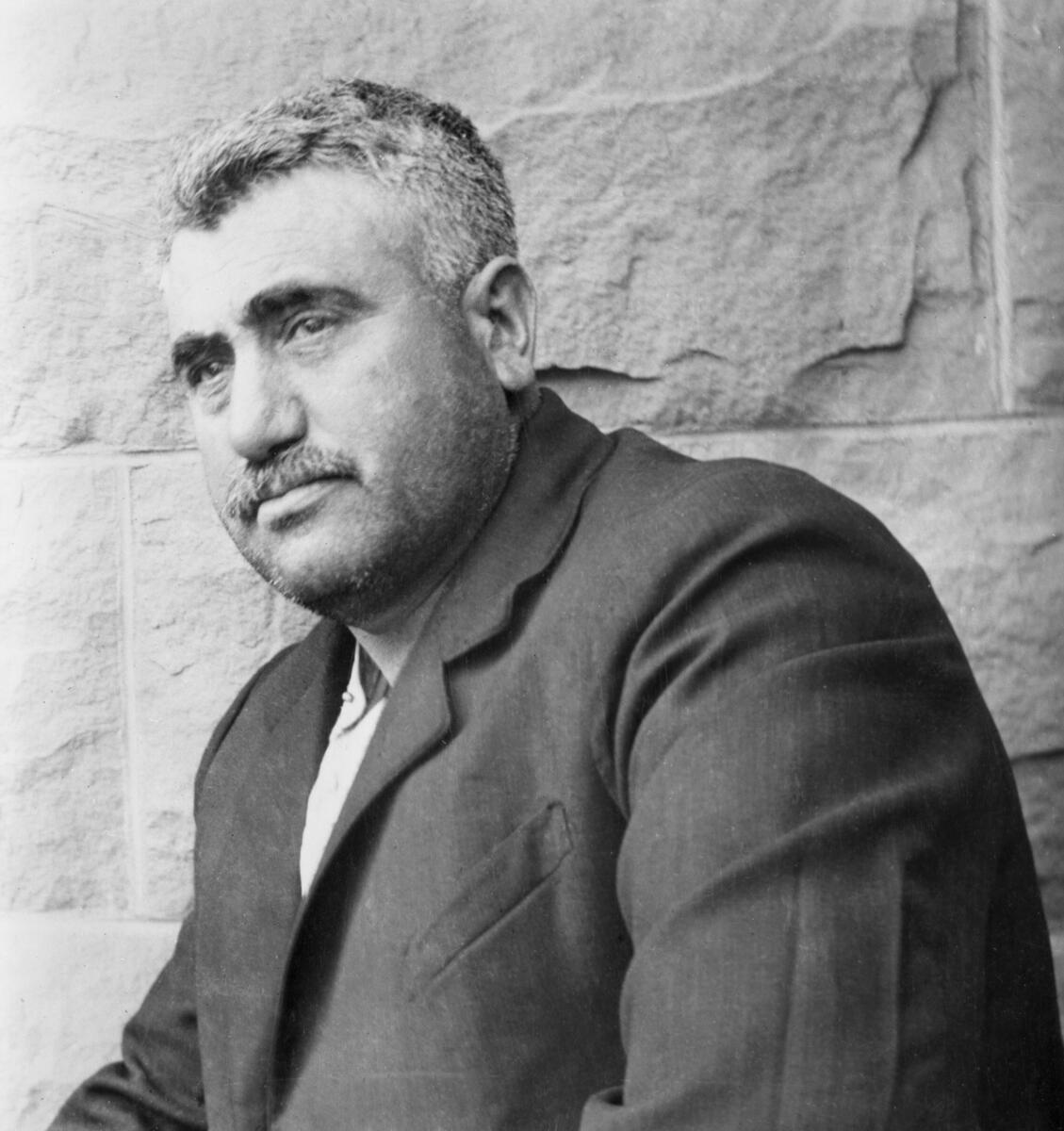
- Picariello in 1922
- Born: November 23, 1879; Capriglia Irpina, Italy
- Died: May 2, 1923 (aged 43); Fort Saskatchewan, Alberta, Canada
- Resting place: St. Joachim Catholic Cemetery, Edmonton, Alberta
- Other names: Emperor Pic, the Bottle King
- Occupation: Bootlegger
- Spouse: Maria Marucci (m. 1900)
- Children: 6
- Status: Executed by hanging
- Conviction: Murder
- Penalty: Death

Emilio Picariello (Italian: [eˈmiːljo pikaˈrjɛllo], Neapolitan: [pikaˈrjellə]; also known as Emileo Picariello and Emil Picariello, November 23, 1879 – May 2, 1923) was an Italian-Canadian bootlegger and convicted murderer, who was hanged at Fort Saskatchewan in 1923 for killing an Alberta Provincial Police constable the previous year.

== Early life ==
Picariello was born in Capriglia Irpina and immigrated to the United States in 1899. He moved to Toronto, Ontario, Canada in 1902, where he worked as an electrician and labourer until he had earned enough money to buy an Italian grocery. In 1900 he married Maria Marucci, who he had met at a boarding house where she worked as a housekeeper; the couple went on to have six children, the eldest of whom was Stefano "Steve" Picariello. In 1911 he moved to Fernie, British Columbia, where he worked in G. Maraniro's macaroni factory. When Maraniro moved to Lethbridge to open a factory there, Picariello rented the Fernie factory and hired women to roll cigars in it.

In 1916 he began to manufacture ice cream at a rate of 400 imperial gallons (1,800 L) per day. He sold this from a wagon during the summer of 1916 and shortly thereafter established ice cream parlours in Trail and Blairmore. He sometimes accepted payment in the form of bottles, which he then sold to bottlers; by 1916 he had achieved a local monopoly. This gained him a reputation as the "Bottle King", which he embraced with newspaper ads reading "E. Picariello, the Bottle King, requests that all persons selling bottles hold them until they see E. Picariello, who pays top prices."

== Bootlegger ==
In 1914, he became the local representative for the Pillock Wine Company. Two years later, prohibition was enacted in Alberta. It was initially still legal to import alcohol from outside the province, and Picarellio profited by transporting alcohol through the Crowsnest Pass.

In 1917, British Columbia also introduced prohibition, and Picariello decided to move to Alberta to be closer to Montana, which allowed the sale of alcohol, while remaining close to the British Columbia distilleries from which he purchased. He bought Blairmore's Alberta Hotel as a base of operations. In 1918 Alberta outlawed the importation of alcohol and Picariello was forced to operate covertly. He excavated a room under the hotel and dug a tunnel from it out to the road, so that alcohol could be smuggled directly into this cellar. He had a player piano in the hotel lounge, whose noise drowned out these activities.

The Alberta Provincial Police (APP) set up checkpoints in the Crowsnest Pass, but Picariello adopted a number of tactics to foil them. Sometimes he would load his cars—Ford Model Ts, initially, replaced in 1918 by three McLaughlins, a number which grew to six by 1922—with sacks of what appeared to be flour. The sacks on the outside of the car, most susceptible to being searched, actually contained flour, but buried beneath them would be sacks containing bottles of alcohol. Another tactic was to send two cars at once, the first empty and the second transporting alcohol; if a checkpoint stopped the first car, the second would quietly retreat. His automobiles came to be known as the "Whiskey Special" cars.

Picariello became a wealthy and respected citizen. He was known locally as the "Emperor Pic" while the Alberta Hotel in Blairmore was known as his "castle". He was elected alderman of Blairmore, and was praised for his philanthropy (among other things, the sacks of decoy flour were distributed to needy families). During World War I, he bought $5,000 worth of victory bonds. While coal miners in the area were on strike in 1918, he contributed money to their families. This respect came even though it was widely known that he was a bootlegger: in 1921 he was fined $20 after the APP found four barrels of alcohol in his warehouse. In January 1922, the APP recovered 70 barrels of beer from a railway car with a bill of lading in Picariello's name; his claim that the beer had been erroneously sent in response to his order for carbonated water did not convince the judge, who fined him $500.

Carlo Sanfidele worked for Picariello as a chauffeur and hotel manager from 1916. Sanfidele's wife, Florence Lassandro looked after Picariello's younger children. Sanfidele and Lassandro also worked with Picariello in his bootlegging operations, after Prohibition was declared in Alberta in 1916, and 1917 in British Columbia. It has been suggested that Lassandro was Picariello's mistress, but this misconception was created by reporters at the time of the trial and has been repeated by several fiction authors in the century since her execution.

== Murder and hanging ==
Police suspected Picariello's son of rum running and chased him by car on September 21, 1922, during which he was shot in the hand by Constable Stephen O. Lawson of the Alberta Provincial Police (APP). Picariello heard a rumour about the shooting and assumed that his son had been killed. Picariello and Lasdandro went to confront Constable Lawson, who was fatally shot in front of the APP barracks in Coleman. The pair then sped off in their car in the direction of Blairmore.

Both Picariello and Lassandro were arrested in Blairmore the following day, and were convicted for Lawson's murder; however, the trial was a questionable affair and it was never determined who actually shot Lawson. The argument that one of them had acted in self-defense was never fully examined either. Nevertheless, both were sentenced to death by hanging on December 2, 1922; they unsuccessfully sought clemency from the courts, the Justice Minister, and the Prime Minister. Originally scheduled to hang on February 21, 1923, Lassandro and Picariello were hanged on the gallows of Fort Saskatchewan penitentiary on May 2, 1923. Both were buried in unmarked graves at St. Joachim Catholic Cemetery in Edmonton. Picariello was popular in Alberta, and public opinion was on the side of Picariello and Lassandro on the day of their executions with many feeling that the death sentences handed down by the court to be excessively harsh in view of the mitigating circumstances. The executions of Picariello and Lassandro are credited with helping to turn public opinion against Prohibition in Alberta.
