= Lille, Alberta =

Lille French Camp
- Former village
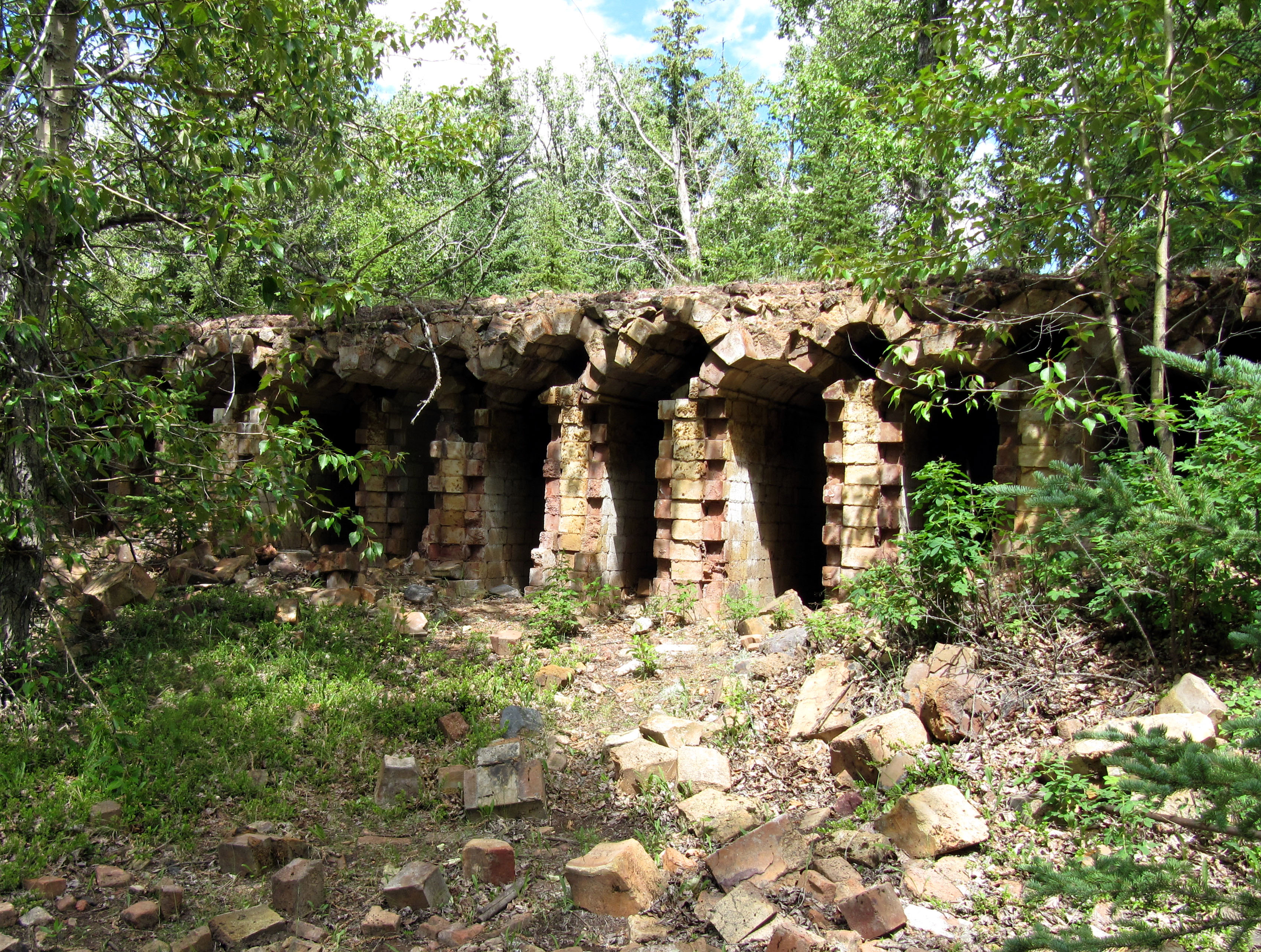
- Ruins of coke ovens at the abandoned Lille townsite

- Location within M.D. of Ranchland Location within the Municipality of Crowsnest Pass Location within Alberta
- Coordinates: 49.651°N 114.397°W
- Country: Canada
- Province: Alberta
- Municipal district: Ranchland No. 66
- Village: February 22, 1904
- Dissolved: 1919

Government
  - Type: Unincorporated
  - Governing body: MD of Ranchland No. 66 Council
- Time zone: UTC−06:00 (Alberta Time)

Lille is a ghost town and former village in the Crowsnest Pass area of southwest Alberta, Canada. It was a company-built coal mining community that, between 1901 and 1912, hosted a population that grew to over 400. The mines at Lille closed in 1912, due primarily to weak coal prices, increasing production costs, and the increasingly poor quality (high ash content) of the coal. The community was then dismantled and most of its structures were moved elsewhere. Today the site is an Alberta Provincial Historic Resource and is known for the elegant ruins of a set of Bernard-style coke ovens that was imported from Belgium.

== History ==
Population history of Lille
Year	Pop.	±%
1901	3	—
1906	413	+13666.7%
1911	303	−26.6%
1916	0	−100.0%
Source: Statistics Canada

Lille was founded as a coal mining community in 1901 by two representatives of a French company, United Gold Fields Ltd., that was re-established as Western Canadian Collieries in 1903. The company representatives, J. J. Fleutot and C. Remy, were prospecting in the Crowsnest Pass area when they happened upon a coal seam near the future site of Lille. Initially called 'French Camp', the community was renamed Lille after the French town of the same name where the mining venture's financial backers were located. Lille was incorporated as a village on February 22, 1904.

The community was built mostly by the mining company. It had electricity and a water works, and grew to a population of 413 by 1906. It included approximately 80 structures. There were miners' residences, a large residence for the superintendent, a doctor's residence, a 15-bed hospital, a 4-room school house, a post office, and a North-West Mounted Police detachment, as well as a coal washery, the mine stable and corral, and 50 Bernard-style coke ovens. Businesses included a hotel, a general store, a bakery, a butcher shop, barber shops, and a liquor store.

Bituminous coal was produced from seams in the Mist Mountain Formation at three mines near Lille by underground room-and-pillar mining methods. Total production over the community's 11-year history was approximately 901,000 metric tons (993,000 short tons). A rail spur called the Frank and Grassy Mountain Railway was built by the company to transport coal and coke from Lille to the Canadian Pacific Railway mainline at Frank. With a length of 11 kilometres (6.8 mi), the rail spur was an expensive undertaking that required construction of 23 trestle bridges to traverse the rough terrain along the steep, narrow valley of Gold Creek.

The Frank Slide in 1903 was a significant setback for the company. It obliterated the southern portion of the rail spur, including many trestles, and mining operations had to be suspended during the rebuilding. Further, the coke ovens that were originally planned for Frank were set up at Lille instead. The ovens, which were used to convert fine coal (slack) into coke, were imported from Belgium, with each brick numbered for ease of reassembly.

Other setbacks for the company included a forest fire that destroyed the railway trestles, difficulties clearing snow from the rail tracks, labour unrest, weak coal prices, increasing production costs, and the increasingly poor quality (high ash content) of the coal. The mines at Lille closed in 1912, after which most of the buildings and equipment were dismantled and moved elsewhere. By 1916, Lille was no longer populated. The village was dissolved in 1919.

== Today ==
Although Lille was declared an Alberta Provincial Historic Resource in 1978, much of the townsite has fallen prey to scavengers. The main attraction is the elegant ruins of the Belgian coke ovens, and the numbers that were used to reassemble the ovens are still visible on many of the bricks. The site can be reached via a 6.3 km (3.9 mi) hike from a parking area near the Frank Slide Interpretive Centre, or by a 7 km (4.3 mi) hike from a parking area on the Grassy Mountain Road from Blairmore.

== See also ==
- List of former urban municipalities in Alberta
