= Hillcrest mine disaster =

1914 coal mining accident in Canada

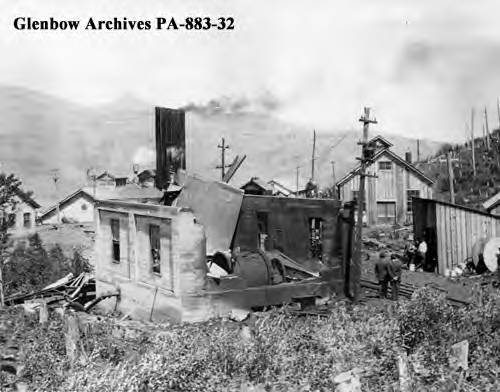
- Date: June 19, 1914 (112 years ago)
- Time: 09:30 MST
- Location: Hillcrest, Alberta; 49.573°N 114.379°W
- Cause: Gas explosions
- Outcome: 189 of 228 workers killed
- Deaths: 189

The Hillcrest mine disaster, the worst coal mining disaster in Canadian history, occurred at Hillcrest, Alberta, in the Crowsnest Pass region, on June 19, 1914, 9:30 am.

The disaster was reported by several news outlets including the Calgary Herald as the world's third-worst mine disaster at the time, after the Fraterville Mine disaster and the Courrières mine disaster. Subsequent investigations found that methane gas had ignited, causing a coal dust explosion, but the cause of the initial spark was never found.

== Explosion ==
The mine started operations at 7:00 a.m. on June 19, 1914. At approximately 9:30 a.m., an explosion ripped through the tunnels, up the slopes and burst from the entries of the mine. John Brown, the general manager of the mine, rushed to the fan room to reverse the suction of air, which would push depleted oxygen back into the mine in an attempt to save any survivors. Initial rescue efforts were hampered by the complete destruction of the one entrance to the mine.

Of the 237 men who entered the mine that day, only 48 were rescued, many of them suffering from the effects of toxic gases.

== Aftermath ==
The accident had a profound effect on the town of Hillcrest Mines, which in 1914 had a population of about 1,000. A total of 189 workers died, about half of the mine's total workforce, which left 90 women widowed and about 250 children fatherless. Many of the victims were buried in a mass grave at the Hillcrest Cemetery. The Government of Alberta held an inquiry into the circumstances surrounding the explosion in 1915.

Condolences came from across the country, including a brief message from King George V, but the commencement of World War I soon overshadowed this event.

I am grieved to hear through the press of the terrible disaster at Hillcrest coal mine by which it is feared hundreds have lost their lives. Please express my deepest sympathy with the sufferers and also with the families of those who have perished.

— King George V

Of the 189 victims of the disaster, many were immigrants, including 43 from the Austro-Hungarian Empire, of whom an estimated 30 were Ukrainian by ethnic origin, including 6 from one village, Karliv (now Prutivka), Galicia.

Operations at Hillcrest mine continued until Hillcrest Collieries, the mine owners, a company headed as president by the Montreal industrialist C. B. Gordon, went into liquidation in April 1938, and the mine was officially closed on December 2, 1939.

A monument to the Hillcrest mine disaster and the lives lost was placed at the Hillcrest Cemetery.

In 1990, Canadian folk-singer James Keelaghan recorded "Hillcrest Mine", one of his best-known songs. The disaster is also featured in the song "Coal Miner" (album Heads Is East, Tails Is West, 2014) by Joal Kamps, an Alberta-based Rocky Mountain folk-pop singer.

== Other area mining accidents ==
On September 19, 1926, another explosion occurred in the Hillcrest mine when the mine was idle, killing two men.

Other explosions at other coal mines within the Crowsnest Pass region also caused deaths:

- Coal Creek, 1902 (128 men killed)
- Michel, 1904 (7)
- Coleman, 1907 (3)
- Bellevue, 1910 (30)
- Michel, 1916 (12)
- Coal Creek, 1917 (34)
- Coleman, 1926 (10)
- Michel, 1938 (3)
