= Greenhill mine =

Coordinates: 49.614432°N 114.443550°W

The Greenhill Mine was a coal mine north of Blairmore, Alberta, Canada.

== History ==
Started by the West Canadian Collieries in 1913, the mining site became the mainstay of Blairmore. The tipple of the mine, located on the side of Bluff Mountain, is now considered a historic site. The Greenhill hit its peak of production in 1946 when 759,000 tons (3,000 tons per day) was processed through the tipple. With the end of the Second World War and the substitution of oil for coal, Blairmore's mining industry slipped into retirement. The Greenhill mine closed April 30, 1957 and West Canadian Collieries closed its offices about a year later.
