= Crowsnest Pass, Alberta =

Crowsnest Pass
- Specialized municipality
- Municipality of Crowsnest Pass
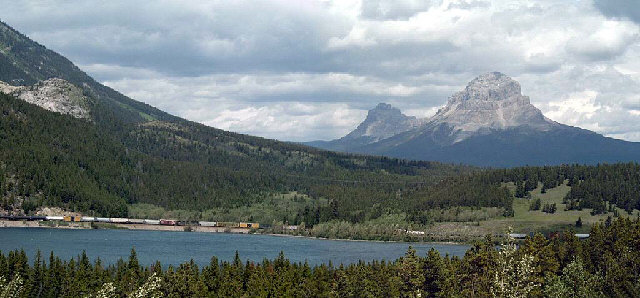
- Scenery in Crownest Pass

- Logo
- Motto: Naturally Rewarding

- Location within Alberta
- Coordinates: 49°37′30″N 114°28′5″W
- Country: Canada
- Province: Alberta
- Region: Southern Alberta
- Census division: 15
- Town: January 1, 1979
- Specialized municipality: January 16, 2008

Government
  - Mayor: Pat Rypien
  - Governing body: Crowsnest Pass Municipal Council
  - CAO: Patrick Thomas
  - MP: John Barlow
  - MLA: Chelsae Petrovic

Area (2021)
  - Land: 370.15 km^{2} (142.92 sq mi)
- Elevation: 1,310 m (4,300 ft)

Population (2021)
  - Total: 5,695
  - Density: 15.4/km^{2} (40/sq mi)
- Time zone: UTC−06:00 (Alberta Time)
- Postal code span: T0K 0E0, 0M0, 0C0, 1C0
- Area code: 403 / 587
- Highways: Highway 3 (Crowsnest Highway)
- Website: Official website

The Municipality of Crowsnest Pass is a specialized municipality in southwest Alberta, Canada. Within the Rocky Mountains adjacent to the eponymous Crowsnest Pass, the municipality formed as a result of the 1979 amalgamation of five municipalities – the Village of Bellevue, the Town of Blairmore, the Town of Coleman, the Village of Frank, and Improvement District No. 5, which included the Hamlet of Hillcrest and numerous other unincorporated communities.

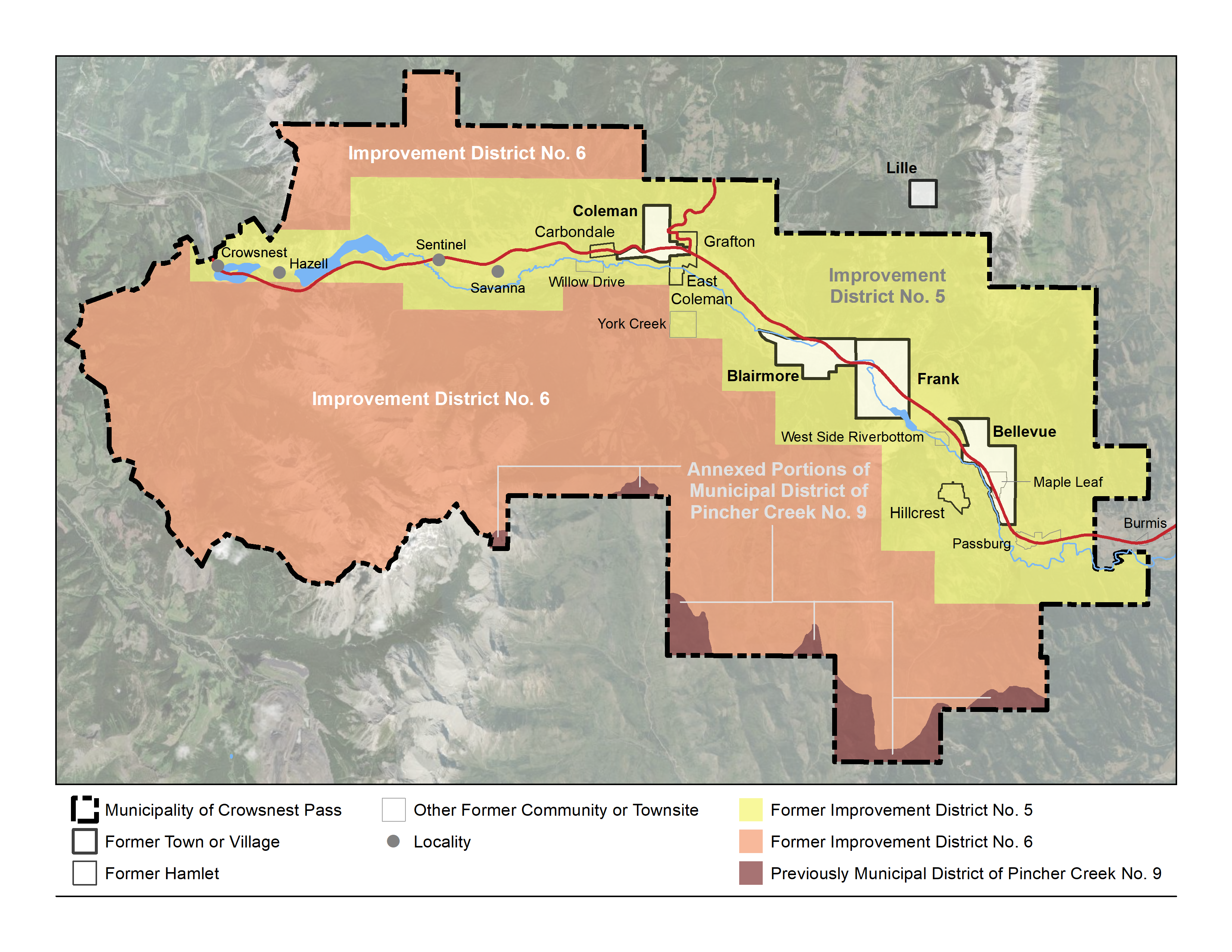
Former municipalities and unincorporated communities of the Crowsnest Pass area

== History ==
The communities in Crowsnest Pass owe their existence to coal mining. The first coal mine in the area opened in 1900. Its ethnic and cultural diversity comes from the many European and other immigrants attracted to the area by the mines. Through the years, coal mining suffered from fluctuating coal prices, bitter strikes, and underground accidents. All the mines on the Alberta side of the pass closed throughout the 20th century as cheaper with the opening of safer open-pit mines on the British Columbia side of the pass. An operating coal mine just across the British Columbia boundary in Sparwood continues to provide employment for residents living in the Municipality of Crowsnest Pass.

Crowsnest Pass is known for tragedy. In 1903, the tip of Turtle Mountain broke loose and decimated part of the Village of Frank. The event was heralded as the Frank Slide. In 1914, the Hillcrest mine disaster occurred near Hillcrest, killing 189 people. Spring floods occurred in 1923 and 1942. Periodic forest fires have swept the valley, including one in the summer of 2003 that threatened the entire municipality.

The area was a centre for "rum-running" during prohibition, from 1916 to 1923, when liquor was illegally brought across the provincial boundary from British Columbia. The legacy is celebrated at the restored Alberta Provincial Police Barracks, which is now an interpretive centre.

On November 3, 1978, the Government of Alberta passed the Crowsnest Pass Municipal Unification Act, which led to the formal amalgamation of Bellevue, Blairmore, Coleman, Frank, and Improvement District (ID) No. 5 on January 1, 1979. The new municipality was granted town status and named the Municipality of Crowsnest Pass. A review of the amalgamation in 1983 concluded that the unification led to improved municipal services and housing within the new municipality.

In the mid-1990s, the adjacent ID No. 6 was carved up with portions going to the MD of Pincher Creek No. 9 on December 31, 1994, the MD of Ranchland No. 66 on January 1, 1995, and ID No. 40 on December 31, 1995. Crowsnest Pass then amalgamated with the remainder of ID No. 6 on January 1, 1996, while ID No. 40 was absorbed by the MD of Pincher Creek No. 9 on the same date. The amalgamated municipality retained the name Municipality of Crowsnest Pass and its town status. It subsequently became a specialized municipality on January 16, 2008. The purpose of the status change was to enable membership in the Alberta Association of Municipal Districts and Counties for increased alignment with its neighbouring rural municipalities.

== Geography ==
The Municipality of Crowsnest Pass is in the southwest portion of the province of Alberta. It borders the province of British Columbia to the west, the Municipal District (MD) of Ranchland No. 66 to the north, and the MD of Pincher Creek No. 9 to the east and south. The Crowsnest River, which originates from Crowsnest Lake, meanders eastward through the municipality. Parts of the Rocky Mountains Forest Reserve are in the northwest and southern portions of the municipality.

=== Communities and localities ===
The following communities are the former municipalities that comprise the Municipality of Crowsnest Pass.

Former towns

- Blairmore
- Coleman

Former villages

- Bellevue
- Frank

Former improvement districts

- Improvement District No. 5 (part)
- Improvement District No. 6 (part)

The following localities are located within the Municipality of Crowsnest Pass.

Localities

- Crowsnest
- East Kootenay
- Hazell
- Hillcrest or Hillcrest Mines
- Savanna
- Sentinel (also known as Sentry Siding)

The following are the unincorporated places that were in Improvement District No. 5 prior to the amalgamation that formed the municipality of Crownsest Pass.

- Carbondale
- Crowsnest Lake
- East Coleman
- Grafton
- Hazell
- Hillcrest
- Sentinel
- West Side Riverbottom
- Willow Creek

== Demographics ==
Federal census population history
Year	Pop.	±%
1976	7,286	—
1981	7,306	+0.3%
1986	6,912	−5.4%
1991	6,679	−3.4%
1996	6,356	−4.8%
2001	6,262	−1.5%
2006	5,749	−8.2%
2011	5,565	−3.2%
2016	5,589	+0.4%
2021	5,695	+1.9%
Source: Statistics Canada

In the 2021 Census of Population conducted by Statistics Canada, the Municipality of Crowsnest Pass had a population of 5,695 living in 2,759 of its 3,403 total private dwellings, a change of 1.9% from its 2016 population of 5,589. With a land area of 370.15 km^{2} (142.92 sq mi), it had a population density of 15.4/km^{2} (39.8/sq mi) in 2021.

In the 2016 Census of Population conducted by Statistics Canada, the Municipality of Crowsnest Pass had a population of 5,589 living in 2,567 of its 3,225 total private dwellings, a change of 0.4% from its 2011 population of 5,565. With a land area of 371.44 km^{2} (143.41 sq mi), it had a population density of 15.0/km^{2} (39.0/sq mi) in 2016.

Municipality of Crowsnest Pass historical population breakdown
Component	2016 population	2006 population	1976 population
Bellevue	397	803	1,186
Blairmore	1,475	2,088	2,321
Coleman	1,545	1,065	1,543
Frank	85	263	201
Improvement District No. 5	1,364	1,257	2,041
Improvement District No. 6	723	273	—
Total Municipality of Crowsnest Pass	5,589	5,749	7,292

== Attractions ==
The Municipality of Crowsnest Pass is home to parts of the Castle Provincial Park in the southeast and the Castle Wildland Provincial Park in the southwest.

Within the Municipality of Crowsnest Pass, one can find the Frank Slide Interpretive Centre (Provincial Historic Site), an interpretive display at Leitch Collieries (Provincial Historic Site) near the former Passburg townsite, underground tours of the Bellevue Mine (Provincial Historic Resource), interpretive signs at the Hillcrest Cemetery (Provincial Historic Resource) and both the Crowsnest Museum and Alberta Provincial Police Barracks interpretive centre within Coleman National Historic Site. Pamphlets for self-guided historical walking and driving tours are available throughout the municipality.

The area offers hiking, fishing and mountain-biking in the summer, and in winter snowmobiling, a downhill ski hill (Pass PowderKeg), and a groomed cross-country ski area, and is about 70 kilometres (43 mi) from major ski hills at both Fernie Alpine Resort and Castle Mountain Resort.

== See also ==
- Lille, Alberta, a nearby ghost town
- List of communities in Alberta
- List of specialized municipalities in Alberta
