= Florence Lassandro =

Italian-Canadian bootlegger

- Mugshot of Lassandro
- Born: Filumena Costanzo; 1900; Cosenza, Kingdom of Italy
- Died: May 2, 1923 (aged 22); Fort Saskatchewan, Alberta, Canada
- Resting place: St Margaret's Cemetery, Fernie, British Columbia
- Occupation: Bootlegger
- Spouse: Carlo Sanfidele (m. 1915)
- Status: Executed by hanging
- Conviction: Murder
- Penalty: Death

Florence Lassandro (Italian: [lasˈsandro]; born Filumena Costanzo [filuˈmɛna kosˈtantso]; c. 1900 – May 2, 1923) was an Italian-Canadian bootlegger who was the only woman to be executed in Alberta.

== Early life ==
Lassandro was born in Cosenza, Italy, immigrating with her family to Canada in 1909, and marrying Carlo Sanfidele (who later changed his surname to Lassandro) on October 16, 1915 in Fernie, British Columbia. Sanfidele was about a decade older than Lassandro, who was only 14 or 15 at the time of the wedding. This was not uncommon in Southern Italian communities at the time. After the marriage, the couple moved to Pennsylvania and then Blairmore, Alberta in search of work. By 1916, Sanfidele was working for Emilio Picariello as a chauffeur and hotel manager. Lassandro looked after Picariello's younger children. Sanfidele and Lassandro also worked with Picariello in his bootlegging operations, after Prohibition was declared in Alberta in 1916, and 1917 in British Columbia. It has been suggested that Lassandro was Picariello's mistress, but this misconception was created by reporters at the time of the trial and has been repeated by several fiction authors in the century since her execution.

== Murder and hanging ==
Police suspected Picariello's son of rum running and chased him by car on September 21, 1922, during which he was shot in the hand by Constable Stephen O. Lawson of the Alberta Provincial Police (APP). Picariello heard a rumour about the shooting and assumed that his son had been killed. Picariello and Lassandro went to confront Constable Lawson, who was fatally shot in front of the APP barracks in Coleman. The pair then sped off in their car in the direction of Blairmore.

Both Picariello and Lassandro were arrested in Blairmore the following day, and were convicted for Lawson's murder; however, the trial was a questionable affair and it was never determined who actually shot Lawson. The argument that one of them had acted in self-defense was never fully examined either. Nevertheless, both were sentenced to death by hanging on December 2, 1922; they unsuccessfully sought clemency from the courts, the Justice Minister, and the Prime Minister. Originally scheduled to hang on February 21, 1923, Lassandro and Picariello were hanged on the gallows of Fort Saskatchewan penitentiary on May 2, 1923, with Lassandro's last words being "I forgive everybody." Both were buried in unmarked graves at St. Joachim Catholic Cemetery in Edmonton. Picariello was popular in Alberta, and public opinion was on the side of Picariello and Lassandro on the day of their executions with many feeling that the death sentences handed down by the court to be excessively harsh in view of the mitigating circumstances. The executions of Picariello and Lassandro are credited with helping to turn public opinion against Prohibition in Alberta. In August 2023, descendants of Lassandro reinterred her at St Margaret's Cemetery in Fernie.

== Media ==
On February 1, 2003, Canadian composer John Estacio, and Canadian librettist John Murrell, premiered Filumena, an opera based on Lassandro's life and death. The opera was performed at the Banff Centre for the Arts in August 2003; was featured in Ottawa, Ontario in April 2005, during the Alberta Scene Festival, which celebrated Albertan culture during the centenary anniversary; and, in November 2005, was the opening work of the 2005/2006 season of the Edmonton Opera in Edmonton, Alberta. The Canadian Broadcasting Corporation broadcast a performance of this opera on March 9, 2006.
