= Crowsnest Ridge =

Mountain in British Columbia, Canada

- Location within Alberta Location within British Columbia Location within Canada
- Interactive map of Crowsnest Ridge

Highest point
- Elevation: 1,903 m (6,243 ft)
- Prominence: 381 m (1,250 ft)
- Coordinates: 49°38′12″N 114°39′30″W

Geography
- Location: Alberta; British Columbia
- Topo map: NTS 82G10 Crowsnest

Crowsnest Ridge is located on the border of Alberta and British Columbia on the Continental Divide.

== See also ==
- List of peaks on the Alberta–British Columbia border
- Mountains of Alberta
- Mountains of British Columbia
