= Crowsnest Lake (Alberta) =

Lake in Alberta, Canada

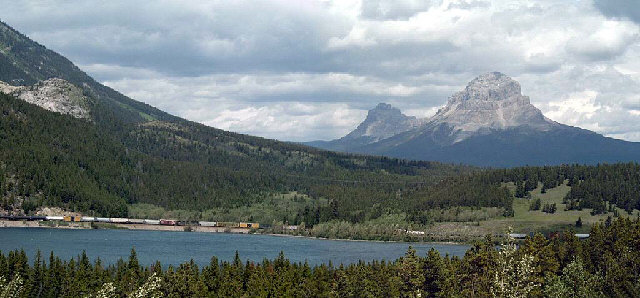
- Crowsnest Lake, looking east toward Crowsnest Mountain

- Location within Alberta
- Location: Municipality of Crowsnest Pass, Alberta
- Coordinates: 49°37′58″N 114°38′16″W
- Basin countries: Canada
- Max. length: 0.9 km (0.56 mi)
- Max. width: 3 km (1.9 mi)
- Surface area: 1.19 km^{2} (0.46 sq mi)
- Average depth: 13.5 m (44 ft)
- Max. depth: 27.4 m (90 ft)
- Surface elevation: 1,357 m (4,452 ft)
- References: Crowsnest Lake

Crowsnest Lake is a lake in southwestern Alberta, Canada. It lies near the summit of the Crowsnest Pass in the southern Canadian Rockies and gives rise to the Crowsnest River.
