= List of specialized municipalities in Alberta =

Specialized municipalities of Alberta
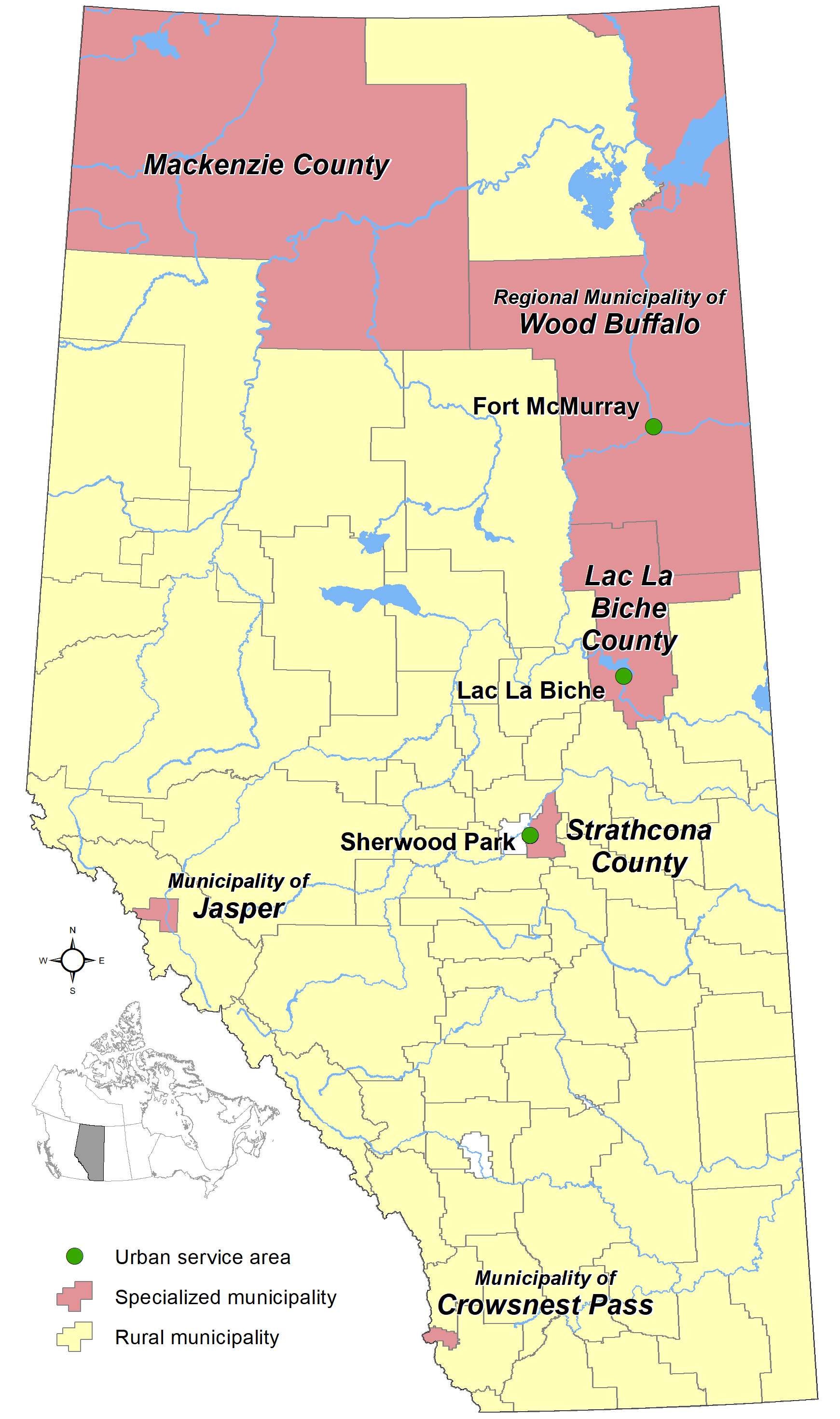
- Distribution of Alberta's six specialized municipalities and three urban service areas.
- Location: Province of Alberta
- Number: 6
- Populations: 4,590 (Jasper) – 98,044 (Strathcona)
- Areas: 371.44 km^{2} (143½ sq. mi.) (Crowsnest Pass) – 80,458.19 km^{2} (31,065 sq. mi.) (Mackenzie)
- Government: Municipal government

A specialized municipality is a unique type of municipal status in the Canadian province of Alberta. These unique local governments are formed without the creation of special legislation, and typically allow for the coexistence of urban and rural areas within the jurisdiction of a single municipal government.

Specialized municipalities may be formed under the authority of Section 83 of the Municipal Government Act (MGA) under one of three of the following scenarios:

- where the Minister of Alberta Municipal Affairs (AMA) is satisfied that the other incorporated statuses under the MGA do not meet the needs of the proposed municipality's residents;
- to form a local government that, in the opinion of the Minister of AMA, will provide for the orderly development of the municipality similarly to the other incorporated statuses within the MGA, including other previously incorporated specialized municipalities;
- for any other circumstances that are deemed appropriate by the Minister of AMA.

Applications for specialized municipality status are approved via orders in council made by the lieutenant governor in council under recommendation from the Minister of AMA.

Alberta has six specialized municipalities that had a cumulative population of 178,598 and an average population of 35,720 in the 2011 Census. Alberta's largest and smallest specialized municipalities are the Strathcona County and the Municipality of Jasper with populations of 92,490 and 4,051 respectively.

44 elected officials (five mayors, one reeve and 39 councillors) provide specialized municipality governance throughout the province.

== Branding ==
An order in council to incorporate any municipality must give the municipality an official name. Of Alberta's six specialized municipalities, two of them have branded themselves simply as municipalities in their official names, while three others have branded themselves as counties. The remaining specialized municipality has branded itself as a regional municipality.

The use of the regional municipality term in the official name of the one specialized municipality has led to a common belief that a regional municipality is its own separate municipal status type in Alberta, which is not the case. Meanwhile, the use of the county term in the official names of three specialized municipalities and 46 municipal districts has partially led to a common belief that a county also is a separate municipal status type, which also is not the case. The other major contributor to this common belief is that a county was a former municipal status type in Alberta before the County Act being repealed in 1995.

== History ==
An update to the MGA in 1994 legislated the ability to incorporate a specialized municipality "when no other classification of municipal government can meet the needs of residents of the proposed municipality." The incorporation of five specialized municipalities followed starting with the Regional Municipality of Wood Buffalo in 1995, Strathcona County in 1996, Mackenzie County in 1999, the Municipality of Jasper in 2001, and the Municipality of Crowsnest Pass in 2008.

=== Regional Municipality of Wood Buffalo ===
The first specialized municipality was created on April 1, 1995, when the former City of Fort McMurray amalgamated with Improvement District (ID) No. 143 to form the Municipality of Wood Buffalo. Specialized municipality status was chosen for the amalgamated municipality "to provide for the unique needs of a municipality including a large urban centre and a large rural territory with a small population." Upon incorporation, Fort McMurray was designated an urban service area, an equivalent to a city under the MGA, while the balance of the municipality was designated a rural service area, an equivalent to a municipal district under the MGA. The Municipality of Wood Buffalo was renamed as the Regional Municipality of Wood Buffalo on August 14, 1996.

=== Strathcona County ===
The second specialized municipality was incorporated on January 1, 1996. Strathcona County changed its status from a municipal district to a specialized municipality "to provide for the unique needs of a municipality that includes both a large urban centre and a significant rural territory and population." The status change designated Strathcona County's large urban centre, Sherwood Park, as Alberta's second city-equivalent urban service area, while its rural territory was designated a rural service area deemed equivalent to a municipal district.

=== Mackenzie County ===
The Municipal District (MD) of Mackenzie No. 23 became the third specialized municipality on June 23, 1999. Previously a municipal district, changed its status "to address concerns about municipal government and management in a municipality that serves several unique communities within a very large territory." Its unique communities include the hamlets of Fort Vermilion, La Crete and Zama City. The order in council that formed the MD of Mackenzie No. 23 as a specialized municipality included a clause to automatically change it back to a municipal district on November 1, 2001. This order in council was amended on January 30, 2001, at which point the clause to automatically revert its status was removed. The MD of Mackenzie No. 23 was renamed Mackenzie County on March 8, 2007.

=== Municipality of Jasper ===
The Jasper Improvement District was established as Alberta's fourth specialized municipality under the name of the Municipality of Jasper on July 20, 2001. It was established as a specialized municipality "to provide for the unique needs of residents living within the municipality." The order in council that formed the specialized municipality defined the Town of Jasper as those lands within the Jasper townsite as described in Canada's National Parks Act.

=== Municipality of Crowsnest Pass ===
The Municipality of Crowsnest Pass was originally formed as a town on January 1, 1979, through the amalgamation of the towns of Blairmore and Coleman, the villages of Bellevue and Frank, and ID No. 5. After another amalgamation with ID No. 6 on January 1, 1996, the Municipality of Crowsnest Pass eventually had its town status changed to specialized municipality status on January 16, 2008. Unlike those of the four other specialized municipalities, no specific reason was provided in the order in council that changed the status of Crowsnest Pass. However, the motivation to become a specialized municipality was to enable membership in the Alberta Association of Municipal Districts and Counties for increased alignment with its neighbouring rural municipalities.

=== Lac La Biche County ===
Lac La Biche County changed status from a municipal district to Alberta's sixth specialized municipality on January 1, 2018. It was originally formed on August 1, 2007, when the Town of Lac La Biche amalgamated with the surrounding Lakeland County. In 2015, it launched an investigation into the possibility of a change in status. By converting to a specialized municipality, Lac La Biche County was able to preserve the lower tax rates applied to its rural areas and the higher tax rates applied to the population centres of Lac La Biche (the former town) and Plamondon. The status change established a rural service area and a two-part urban service area. While one part includes the Hamlet of Lac La Biche and the other includes the Hamlet of Plamondon, the two-part urban service area is simply named Lac La Biche.

== List ==
List of specialized municipalities in Alberta
Name	Region	Incorporation date (specialized municipality)	Council size	2021 Census of Population				
Name	Region	Incorporation date (specialized municipality)	Council size	Population (2021)	Population (2016)	Change	Land area (km^{2})	Population density (/km^{2})
Crowsnest Pass, Municipality of	Southern Alberta	January 16, 2008	7	5,695	5,589	+1.9%	370.15	15.4
Jasper, Municipality of	Alberta's Rockies	July 20, 2001	7	4,738	4,590	+3.2%	921.90	5.1
Lac La Biche County (Note: Excludes the unpopulated land area of the portion of the Kikino Metis Settlement that is within Lac La Biche County.)	Northern Alberta	January 1, 2018	9	7,673	8,330	−7.9%	12,527.48	0.6
Mackenzie County	Northern Alberta	June 23, 1999	10	12,804	11,171	+14.6%	79,629.26	0.2
Strathcona County	Edmonton Metro	January 1, 1996	9	99,225	98,044	+1.2%	1,170.65	84.8
Wood Buffalo, Regional Municipality of	Northern Alberta	April 1, 1995	11	72,326	71,589	+1.0%	60,843.88	1.2
Total specialized municipalities	—	—	53	202,461	199,298	+1.6%	155,463.32	1.3

== Potential specialized municipalities ==
Other municipalities that have investigated specialized municipality status include Spruce Grove, Morinville and Grande Prairie. Proponents of the Cooking Lake Airport have also expressed interest in breaking away from Strathcona County to form a separate specialized municipality.

== See also ==
- List of census divisions of Alberta
- List of cities in Alberta
- List of communities in Alberta
- List of designated places in Alberta
- List of hamlets in Alberta
- List of municipal districts in Alberta
- List of municipalities in Alberta
- List of summer villages in Alberta
- List of towns in Alberta
- List of villages in Alberta
