= Bellevue, Alberta =

Bellevue Maple Leaf
- Former village
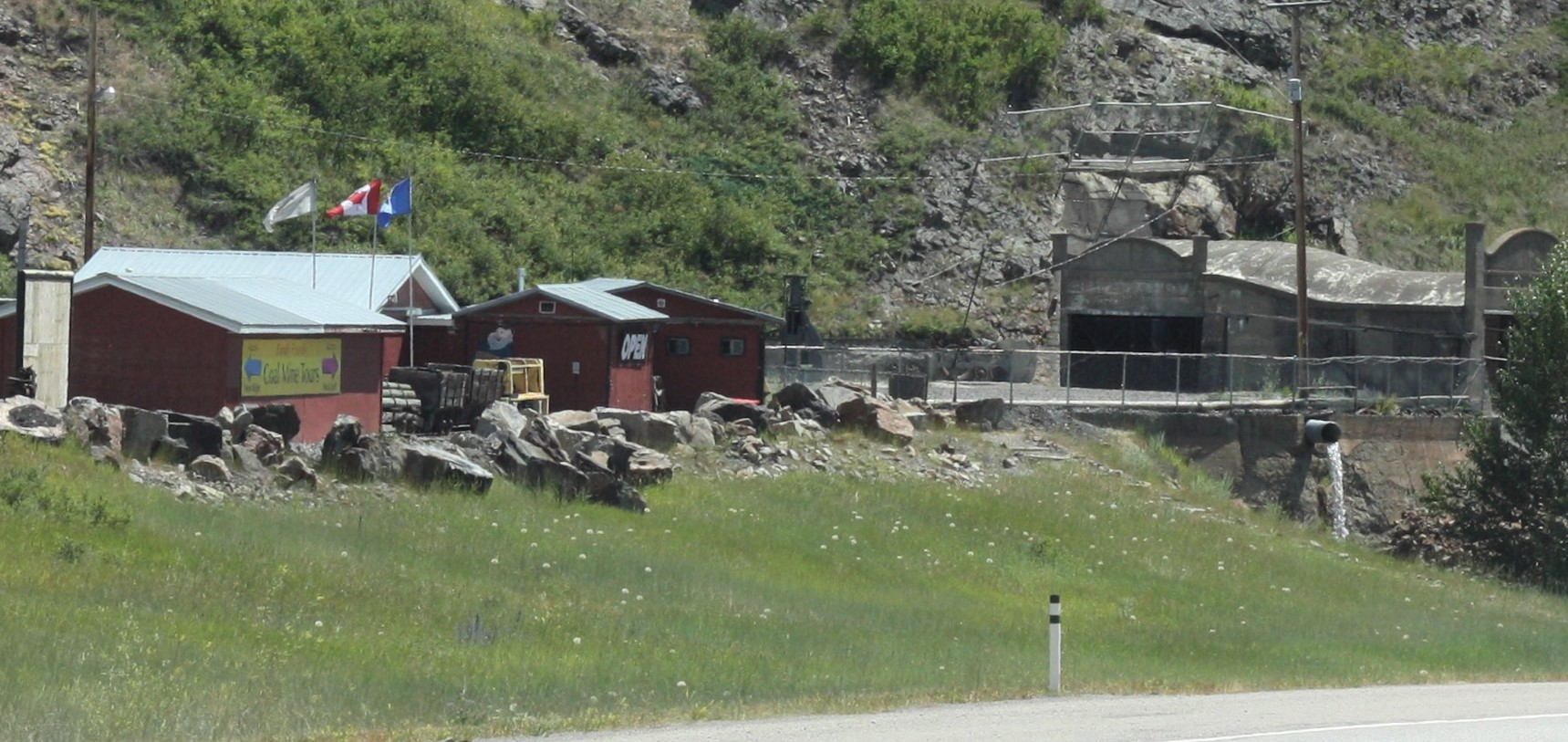
- Bellevue Underground Mine museum

- Location within the Municipality of Crowsnest Pass Location within Alberta
- Coordinates: 49.5808°N 114.3661°W
- Country: Canada
- Province: Alberta
- Specialized municipality: Crowsnest Pass
- Village: January 1, 1957
- Amalgamation: January 1, 1979

Government
  - Type: Unincorporated
  - Governing body: Municipality of Crowsnest Pass Council

Area (2021)
  - Land: 3.01 km^{2} (1.16 sq mi)

Population (2021)
  - Total: 911
  - Density: 302.2/km^{2} (783/sq mi)
- Time zone: UTC−06:00 (Alberta Time)

Bellevue (/ˈbɛlvjuː/) is an urban community perched at 4,280 feet (1,305 m) elevation in the Rocky Mountains within the Municipality of Crowsnest Pass in southwest Alberta, Canada. It was formerly incorporated as a village prior to 1979 when it amalgamated with four other municipalities to form Crowsnest Pass.

Unlike some of the other communities in Crowsnest Pass, which relied on a single coal mine, Bellevue benefitted from the proximity of several successful mines and persists today despite setbacks from fire, strikes, mine accidents and fluctuations in the coal market.

== History ==
Bellevue was founded in 1905 on the flat land above the Bellevue Mine operated by the French-based West Canadian Collieries (WCC). Its post office opened in 1907. The naming of the town is credited to Elsie Fleutot, the young daughter of one of WCC's French Canadian principals, Jules J. Fleutot, after she exclaimed "Quelle belle vue!" (What a beautiful view!). In 1909, the Maple Leaf Coal Company commenced operations at the Mohawk Bituminous Mine and constructed the settlement of Maple Leaf adjacent to Bellevue. In 1913, WCC transferred many workers to Bellevue from its closed Lille operations. WCC displayed a five-ton coal boulder at the 1910 Dominion Exhibition in Calgary.

This period of growth was not without setbacks. An explosion in the Bellevue Mine during a partial afternoon shift on December 9, 1910, killed 30 miners. In 1917, a fire destroyed most of Bellevue's business section, followed by smaller fires in 1921 and 1922. A shanty-town called Bush Town, or Il Bosc, below Bellevue was flooded in 1923 but persisted for several years.

West Canadian Collieries opened the Adanac Mine at Byron Creek in 1945, but by 1957 all of the Bellevue area mines were closed. The tipple at Bellevue continued to process coal from WCC's Grassy Mountain open-pit, but was removed in 1962 after that operation closed. These closures caused a critical reduction in Bellevue's tax base.

Bellevue finally incorporated as a village on January 1, 1957. The realignment of Highway 3 in the 1970s led to a decline of Bellevue's business section. On November 3, 1978, the Government of Alberta passed the Crowsnest Pass Municipal Unification Act, which led to the formal amalgamation of the Village of Bellevue with the Town of Blairmore, the Town of Coleman, the Village of Frank, and Improvement District (ID) No. 5 on January 1, 1979.

=== Bellevue Café shootout ===
On August 2, 1920, local miners George Arkoff, Ausby Auloff and Tom Bassoff robbed the Canadian Pacific Railway's train No. 63 at gunpoint, hoping to find wealthy rum-runner Emilio "Emperor Pic" Picariello aboard. Eluding the Royal Canadian Mounted Police, the Alberta Provincial Police and the CPR Police, Auloff escaped into the United States while Bassoff and Arkoff remained in the area. On August 7, the two were spotted in the Bellevue Café. Three constables entered the café through the front and back doors, and in the ensuing shootout Arkoff, RCMP Corporal Ernest Usher and APP Constable F.W.E. Bailey were killed, while Bassoff, though wounded, escaped into the rubble of the Frank Slide. During the pursuit, Special Constable Nicolas Kyslik was accidentally shot and killed by another officer. Bassoff was eventually apprehended without incident on August 11 at Pincher Station, 35 kilometres to the east.

Although testimony suggests that the police officers had failed to identify themselves and had probably fired first, Bassoff was found guilty of murder and hanged in Lethbridge on December 22, 1920.

Ausby Auloff was captured in 1924 near Butte, Montana, after trying to sell a distinctive railway watch. Auloff, who had not been involved in the shootout, was returned to Alberta where he was sentenced to seven years' imprisonment, and died in 1926.

== Demographics ==
Population history of Bellevue

Year	Pop.	±%
1901	3	—
1911	463	+15333.3%
1941	1,182	+155.3%
1951	1,884	+59.4%
1956	1,419	−24.7%
1961	1,323	−6.8%

Year	Pop.	±%
1966	1,174	−11.3%
1971	1,242	+5.8%
1976	1,186	−4.5%
1981	1,230	+3.7%
1986	1,048	−14.8%
1991	1,086	+3.6%

Year	Pop.	±%
1996	1,046	−3.7%
2006	803	−23.2%
2016	866	+7.8%
2021	911	+5.2%

Source: Statistics Canada

In the 2021 Census of Population conducted by Statistics Canada, Bellevue had a population of 911 living in 445 of its 555 total private dwellings, a change of 5.2% from its 2016 population of 866. With a land area of 3.01 km^{2} (1.16 sq mi), it had a population density of 302.7/km^{2} (783.9/sq mi) in 2021.

== See also ==
- List of former urban municipalities in Alberta
