= Blairmore, Alberta =

Blairmore Tenth Siding The Springs
- Former village
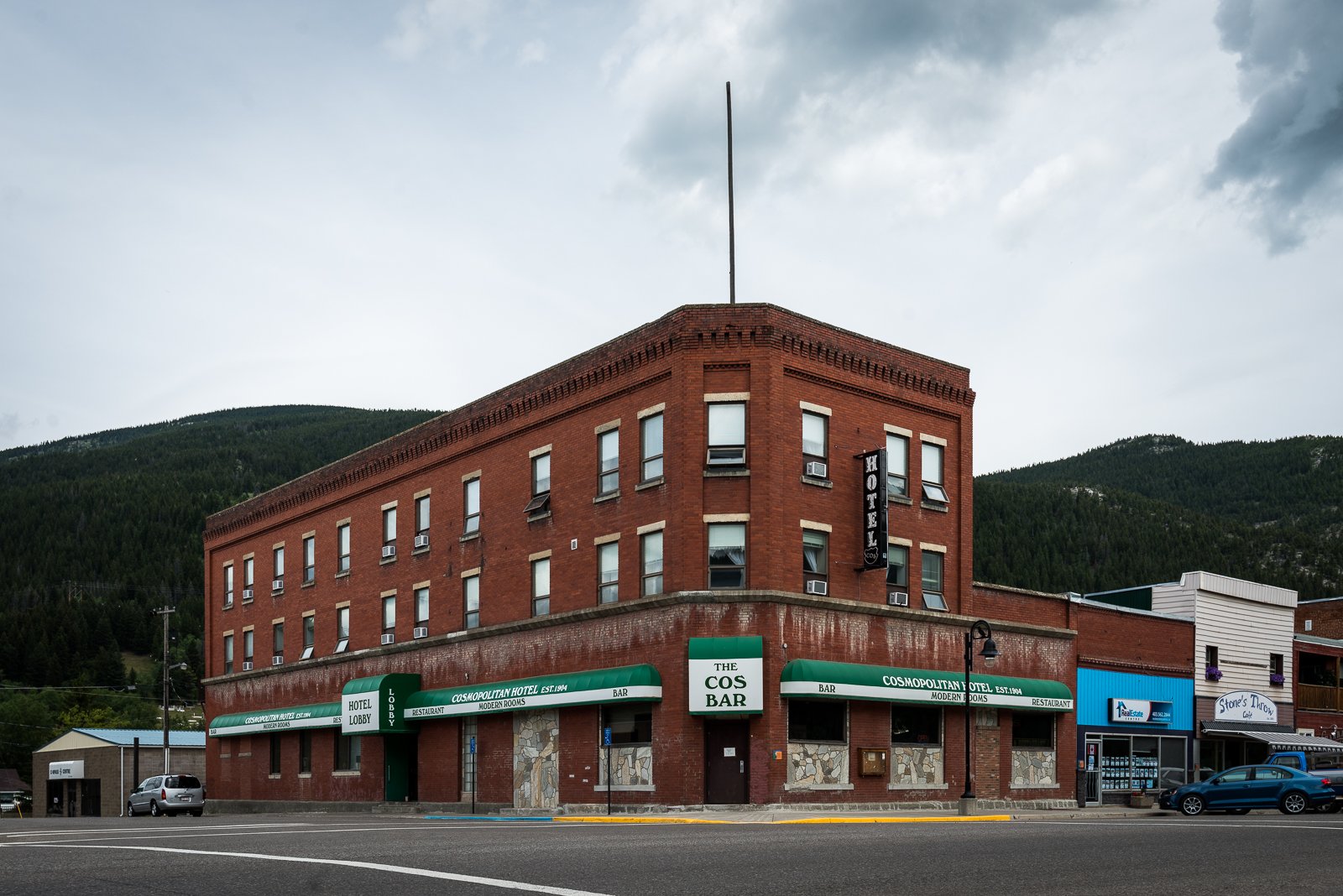
- The Cosmopolitan Hotel and Bar in Blairmore

- Location within the Municipality of Crowsnest Pass Location within Alberta
- Coordinates: 49°36′29″N 114°26′20″W
- Country: Canada
- Province: Alberta
- Census division: No. 15
- Specialized municipality: Municipality of Crowsnest Pass
- Village: September 3, 1901
- Town: September 29, 1911
- Amalgamated: January 1, 1979

Government
  - Type: Unincorporated
  - Governing body: Municipality of Crowsnest Pass Council

Area
  - Land: 2.04 km^{2} (0.79 sq mi)

Population (2021)
  - Total: 1,522
  - Density: 741.6/km^{2} (1,921/sq mi)
- Time zone: UTC−06:00 (Alberta Time)

Blairmore is a community in the Rocky Mountains within the Municipality of Crowsnest Pass in southwest Alberta, Canada. It was formerly incorporated as a town prior to 1979 when it amalgamated with four other municipalities to form Crowsnest Pass. Blairmore is the principal commercial centre of Crowsnest Pass.

== History ==
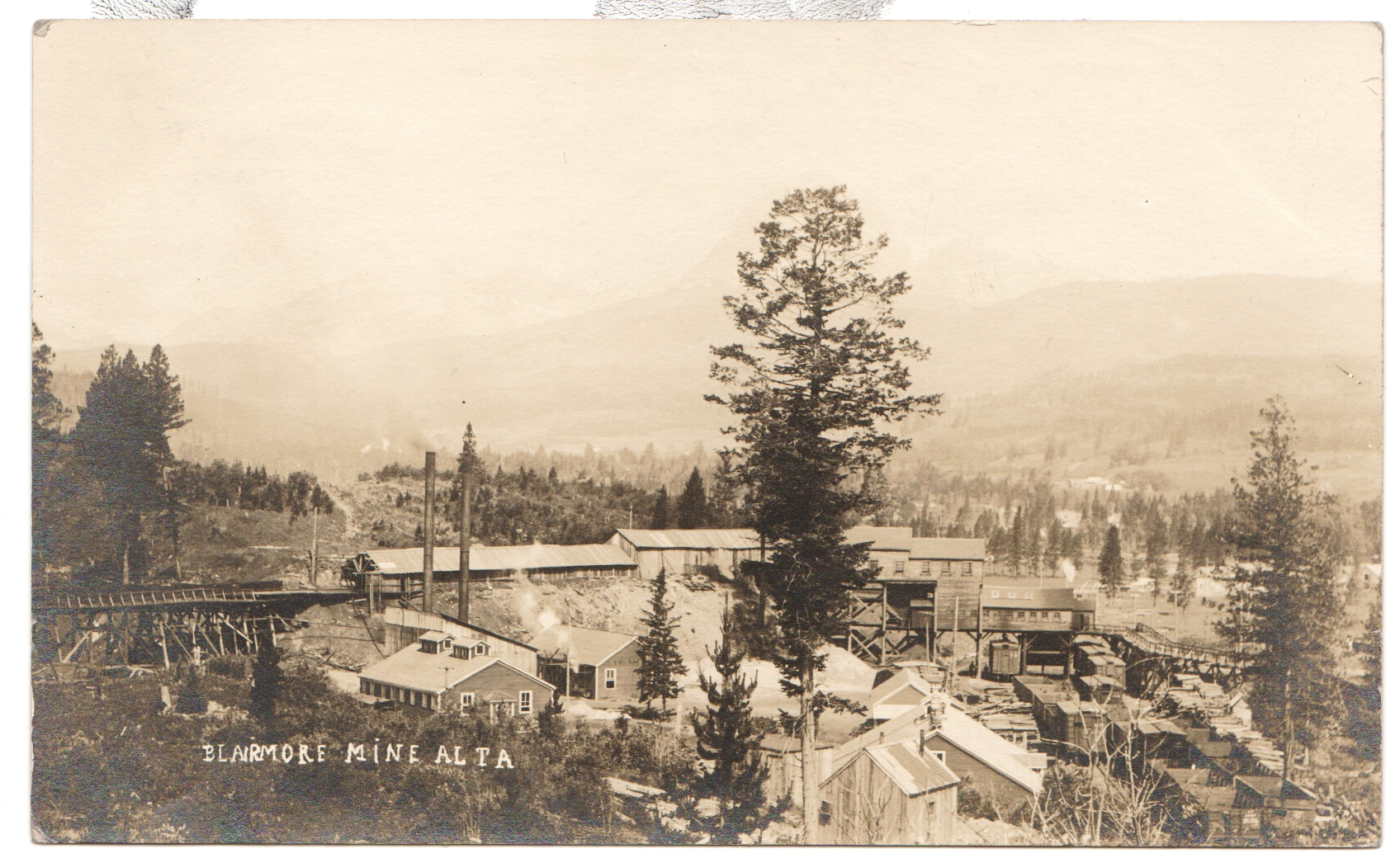
Old mine in Blairmore

Originally a Canadian Pacific Railway stop called Tenth Siding or The Springs (for the cold sulphur spring to the east), the settlement was renamed Blairmore in November 1898 and it got a post office the following year. A ten-year dispute over land ownership between the CPR station agent and the section foreman stunted early development. The community was incorporated as the Village of Blairmore on September 3, 1901. Blairmore's principal industry was lumber and, after 1907, coal. Other industries soon followed. Blairmore incorporated as a town on September 29, 1911. With the declining fortunes of the nearby community of Frank, Blairmore soon became the region's economic centre. The Greenhill mine, located just north of Blairmore, became the mainstay of the community until its closure in 1957.

One of the town's early residents was Emilio Picariello (1875 – 1923). "Emperor Pic" settled in Blairmore in 1918 and operated several businesses, but also illegally imported alcohol from nearby British Columbia during prohibition. Picariello and Florence Lassandro were hanged in 1923 after the shooting death of Alberta Provincial Police constable Steve Lawson in 1922.

Like many Canadian industrial towns in the 1930s, many in Blairmore had Communist sentiment. Canada's first Communist town council and school board were elected in Blairmore in January 1933. The radical council was re-elected in 1934 and 1935. The radical council reformed the tax system. It refused to observe Remembrance Day as an Imperialist holiday and honoured the Russian Revolution instead. It put a new name on a town street to honour Tim Buck, the leader of the Communist Party of Canada, and renamed a park after Karl Marx. Later town councils reversed both decisions. (A move was made in 1990 to re-apply the Tim Buck name to the street but it was blocked.)

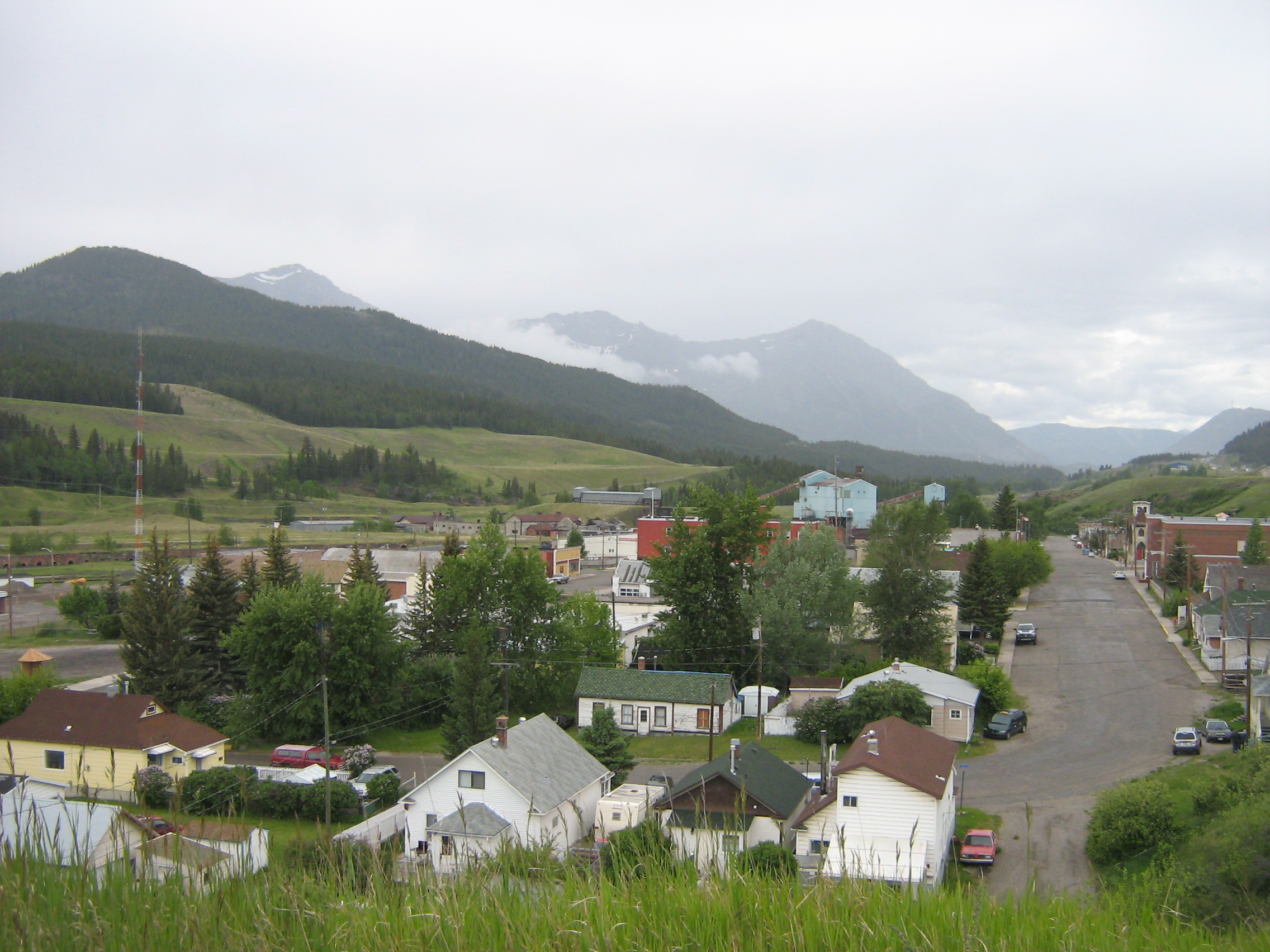
View of Coleman against the backdrop of the Canadian Rockies

On November 3, 1978, the Government of Alberta passed the Crowsnest Pass Municipal Unification Act, which led to the formal amalgamation of the Town of Blairmore with the Village of Bellevue, the Town of Coleman, the Village of Frank, and Improvement District (ID) No. 5 on January 1, 1979.

=== Canadian Militia ===
From 1946 to 1965, Blairmore was home to Canadian Militia units associated with the Royal Canadian Electrical Mechanical Engineers. From 1946 to 1950, No. 22 Armoured Workshop existed prior to being renamed as a Troop of 39 Technical Squadron (1950–1954) and eventually the 31st Technical Squadron (1954–1965). During this time, the Squadron had a band which regularly paraded within the town as well as a 535 Royal Canadian Army Cadet Corps, which existed until 1971.

== Geography ==
Blairmore is located in southwest Alberta in the Canadian Rockies. It is approximately 135 km (84 mi) west of Lethbridge on Highway 3 (Crowsnest Highway) and approximately 20 km (12 mi) east of the British Columbia border. Fellow Crowsnest Pass communities Frank and Coleman are 3 km (1.9 mi) to the east and 6 km (3.7 mi) to the west respectively.

=== Geology ===
Volcanic rocks in the Blairmore area are related to the Crowsnest Formation. As a geological unit, the volcanics received some attention in the late 1980s when geologists stated they had found trace amounts of gold in certain units of the volcanics. Blairmorite, a rare volcanic rock of the Crowsnest Formation, is named after Blairmore.

== Demographics ==
Population history of Blairmore

| Year | Pop. | ±% |
|---|---|---|
| 1901 | 231 | — |
| 1906 | 449 | +94.4% |
| 1911 | 1,137 | +153.2% |
| 1916 | 1,219 | +7.2% |
| 1921 | 1,552 | +27.3% |
| 1926 | 1,609 | +3.7% |
| 1931 | 1,629 | +1.2% |
| 1936 | 1,682 | +3.3% |
| 1941 | 1,731 | +2.9% |
| 1946 | 1,767 | +2.1% |
| 1951 | 1,933 | +9.4% |
| 1956 | 1,973 | +2.1% |
| 1961 | 1,980 | +0.4% |

| Year | Pop. | ±% |
|---|---|---|
| 1966 | 1,779 | −10.2% |
| 1971 | 2,037 | +14.5% |
| 1976 | 2,321 | +13.9% |
| 1981 | 2,384 | +2.7% |
| 1986 | 2,256 | −5.4% |
| 1991 | 2,163 | −4.1% |
| 1996 | 2,118 | −2.1% |
| 2001 | 1,993 | −5.9% |
| 2006 | 1,830 | −8.2% |
| 2011 | 1,723 | −5.8% |
| 2016 | 1,545 | −10.3% |
| 2021 | 1,522 | −1.5% |

Source: Statistics Canada

In the 2021 Census of Population, the urban population centre of Blairmore, as delineated by Statistics Canada, recorded a population of 1,522 living in 731 of its 896 total private dwellings, a change of −1.5% from its 2016 population of 1,545. With a land area of 2.04 km^{2} (0.79 sq mi), it had a population density of 746.1/km^{2} (1,932.3/sq mi) in 2021.

As a population centre in the 2016 Census of Population conducted by Statistics Canada, Blairmore recorded a population of 1,545 living in 731 of its 886 total private dwellings, a 1.6% change from its 2011 population of 1,521. With a land area of 2.04 km^{2} (0.79 sq mi), it had a population density of 757.4/km^{2} (1,961.5/sq mi) in 2016.

== See also ==
- List of former urban municipalities in Alberta
