= Coleman, Alberta =

Coleman
- Unincorporated community
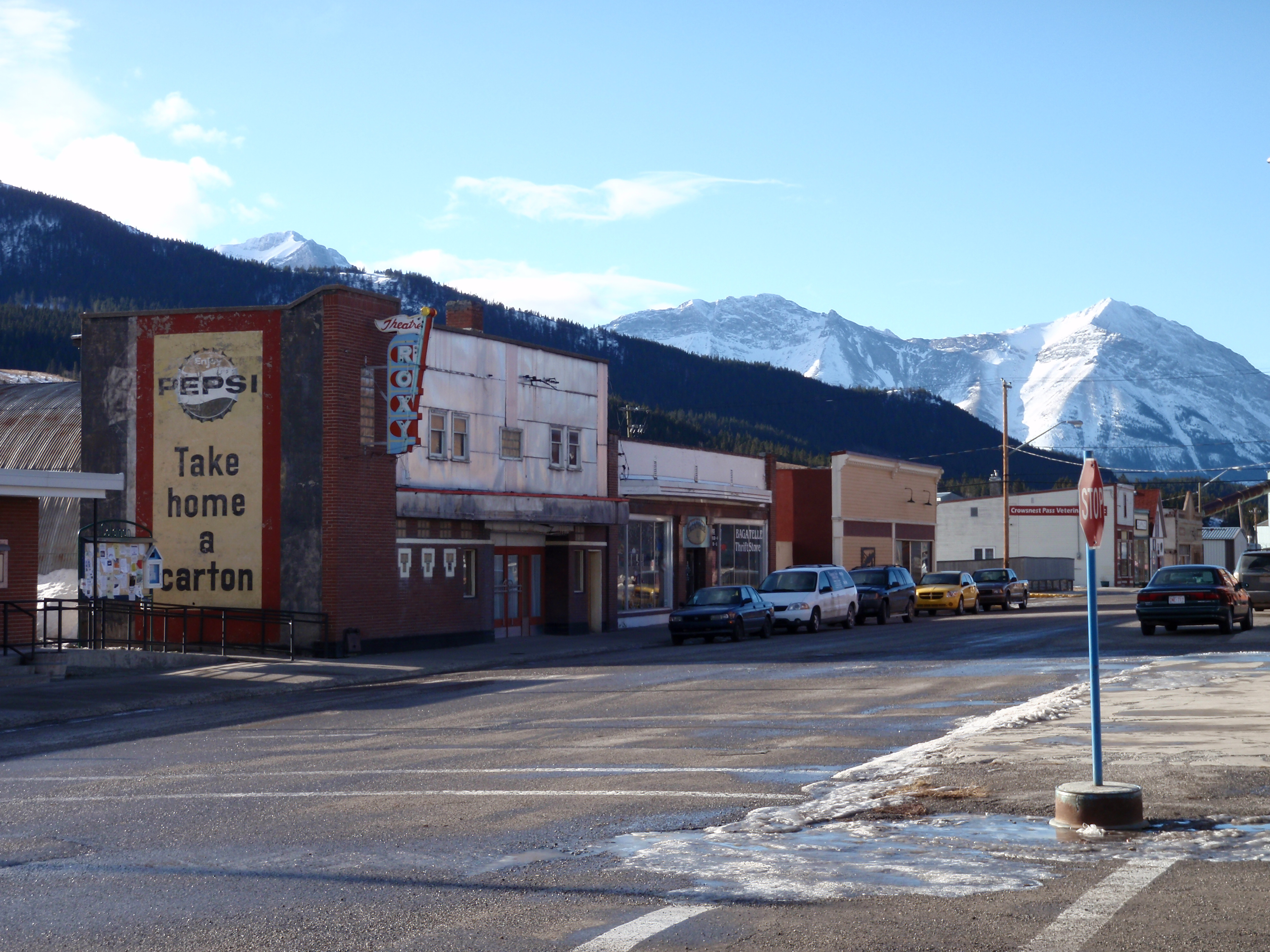

- Location within the Municipality of Crowsnest Pass Location within Alberta
- Coordinates: 49.635°N 114.503°W
- Country: Canada
- Province: Alberta
- Specialized municipality: Municipality of Crowsnest Pass
- Village: 11 January 1904
- Town: 10 September 1910
- Amalgamated: 1 January 1979

Government
  - Type: Unincorporated
  - Governing body: Municipality of Crowsnest Pass Council

Area
  - Land: 1.99 km^{2} (0.77 sq mi)
- Elevation: 1,320 m (4,330 ft)

Population (2021)
  - Total: 1,441
  - Density: 724.1/km^{2} (1,875/sq mi)
- Time zone: UTC−06:00 (Alberta Time)

Coleman is a community in the Rocky Mountains within the Municipality of Crowsnest Pass in southwest Alberta, Canada. It was formerly incorporated as a town prior to 1979 when it amalgamated with four other municipalities to form Crowsnest Pass.

Coleman is located in Census Division No. 15 and in the riding of Macleod. It is served by Highway 3 (Crowsnest Highway) and the Canadian Pacific Railway.

== History ==
In 1903, a new townsite was laid out a few kilometres west of Blairmore, to service new coal mines operated by the International Coal and Coke Company and McGillivray mining operation. The post office rejected a proposal to name it Paulson's Camp or McGillivray Hill. Coleman (the maiden name of the mother of president and mine owner A. C. Flumerfelt's wife, Ada, and the middle name of his youngest daughter, Norma Coleman Flumerfelt) was accepted. Coleman was incorporated as a village on 11 January 1904. It then incorporated as a town on 10 September 1910.

A feature of Coleman was the mine's 100 (later 216) coke ovens located at it outskirts, which operated from 1906 to 1952. The town grew rapidly, surpassing its neighbour Blairmore as the largest in the region. Coleman had an opera house from 1908 until it burned down in 1948.

Coleman persevered through strikes (1911 and 1932), floods (1923 and 1942), and fires (1948). As the coal mines in the region gradually closed, Coleman's commercial importance waned in favour of Blairmore. On 3 November 1978, the Government of Alberta passed the Crowsnest Pass Municipal Unification Act, which led to the formal amalgamation of the Town of Coleman with the Village of Bellevue, the Town of Blairmore, the Village of Frank, and Improvement District (ID) No. 5 on 1 January 1979.

Coleman's coal mining heritage is evident in its several historic buildings, a regional museum, the ruins of its coal plant and coke ovens, several nearby abandoned mines, and the "biggest piggy bank in the world" made from a 36-inch (910 mm) gauge air driven thermos bottle mine locomotive. Much of the downtown section now forms the Coleman National Historic Site.

== Geography ==
=== Climate ===
Coleman has a subarctic climate (Dfc) with mild to warm summers and cold, snowy winters.

Climate data for Coleman
Month	Jan	Feb	Mar	Apr	May	Jun	Jul	Aug	Sep	Oct	Nov	Dec	Year
Record high °C (°F)	11.5 (52.7)	13.9 (57.0)	18.3 (64.9)	25.6 (78.1)	29.0 (84.2)	30.0 (86.0)	35.0 (95.0)	34.0 (93.2)	32.0 (89.6)	26.0 (78.8)	16.0 (60.8)	13.5 (56.3)	35.0 (95.0)
Mean daily maximum °C (°F)	−1.6 (29.1)	0.1 (32.2)	4.6 (40.3)	9.5 (49.1)	14.4 (57.9)	18.7 (65.7)	22.1 (71.8)	22.8 (73.0)	17.0 (62.6)	10.2 (50.4)	1.4 (34.5)	−3.0 (26.6)	9.7 (49.5)
Daily mean °C (°F)	−6.4 (20.5)	−5.0 (23.0)	−0.8 (30.6)	3.6 (38.5)	7.9 (46.2)	11.8 (53.2)	14.3 (57.7)	14.3 (57.7)	9.5 (49.1)	4.6 (40.3)	−2.7 (27.1)	−7.4 (18.7)	3.6 (38.5)
Mean daily minimum °C (°F)	−11.3 (11.7)	−10.1 (13.8)	−6.2 (20.8)	−2.4 (27.7)	1.3 (34.3)	4.9 (40.8)	6.5 (43.7)	5.7 (42.3)	2.0 (35.6)	−1.1 (30.0)	−6.8 (19.8)	−11.9 (10.6)	−2.4 (27.7)
Record low °C (°F)	−39.4 (−38.9)	−37.5 (−35.5)	−37.2 (−35.0)	−24.4 (−11.9)	−8.3 (17.1)	−5.6 (21.9)	−3.3 (26.1)	−7.0 (19.4)	−11.0 (12.2)	−27.0 (−16.6)	−37.0 (−34.6)	−41.1 (−42.0)	−41.1 (−42.0)
Average precipitation mm (inches)	34.8 (1.37)	37.1 (1.46)	38.6 (1.52)	39.8 (1.57)	69.6 (2.74)	70.2 (2.76)	62.6 (2.46)	43.7 (1.72)	45.9 (1.81)	46.4 (1.83)	56.2 (2.21)	37.3 (1.47)	582.1 (22.92)
Average rainfall mm (inches)	12.7 (0.50)	10.8 (0.43)	13.0 (0.51)	23.0 (0.91)	60.8 (2.39)	70.2 (2.76)	62.6 (2.46)	43.2 (1.70)	44.3 (1.74)	32.8 (1.29)	22.4 (0.88)	9.2 (0.36)	404.8 (15.94)
Average snowfall cm (inches)	22.1 (8.7)	26.4 (10.4)	25.6 (10.1)	16.7 (6.6)	8.8 (3.5)	0.0 (0.0)	0.0 (0.0)	0.5 (0.2)	1.7 (0.7)	13.6 (5.4)	33.9 (13.3)	28.1 (11.1)	177.3 (69.8)
Source: Environment Canada

== Demographics ==
Population history of Coleman

Year	Pop.	±%
1906	915	—
1911	1,557	+70.2%
1916	1,559	+0.1%
1921	1,590	+2.0%
1926	2,044	+28.6%
1931	1,704	−16.6%

Year	Pop.	±%
1936	2,129	+24.9%
1941	1,870	−12.2%
1946	1,809	−3.3%
1951	1,961	+8.4%
1956	1,568	−20.0%
1961	1,713	+9.2%

Year	Pop.	±%
1966	1,507	−12.0%
1971	1,534	+1.8%
1976	1,543	+0.6%
2011	1,366	−11.5%
2016	1,475	+8.0%
2021	1,441	−2.3%

Source: Statistics Canada

In the 2021 Census of Population, the urban population centre of Coleman, as delineated by Statistics Canada, recorded a population of 1,441 living in 722 of its 907 total private dwellings, a change of −2.3% from its 2016 population of 1,475. With a land area of 1.99 km^{2} (0.77 sq mi), it had a population density of 724.1/km^{2} (1,875.5/sq mi) in 2021.

As a population centre in the 2016 Census of Population conducted by Statistics Canada, Coleman recorded a population of 1,475 living in 696 of its 891 total private dwellings, an 8% change from its 2011 population of 1,366. With a land area of 1.97 km^{2} (0.76 sq mi), it had a population density of 748.7/km^{2} (1,939.2/sq mi) in 2016.

== Notable people ==
- Joe Kryczka, Justice of the Court of Queen's Bench of Alberta, president of the Canadian Amateur Hockey Association
- Rick Rypien, NHL Hockey Player for the Vancouver Canucks and Winnipeg Jets

== See also ==
- List of former urban municipalities in Alberta
