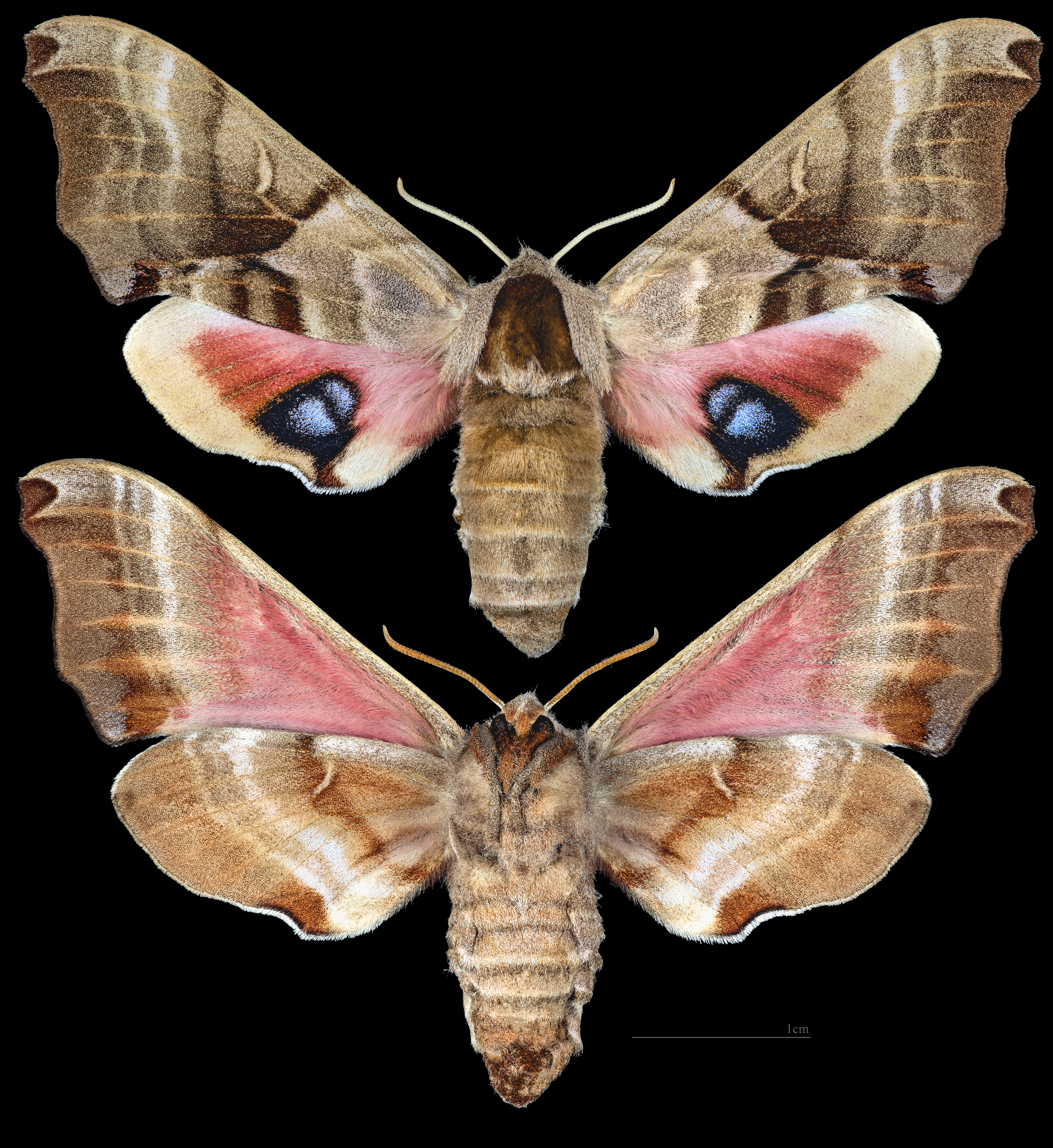
- Smerinthus jamaicensis

Scientific classification
- Domain: Eukaryota
- Kingdom: Animalia
- Phylum: Arthropoda
- Class: Insecta
- Order: Lepidoptera
- Family: Sphingidae
- Genus: Smerinthus
- Species: S. jamaicensis

Binomial name
- Smerinthus jamaicensis (Drury, 1773)

Synonyms
- Sphinx jamaicensis Drury, 1773; Smerinthus geminatus Say, 1824; Calasymbolus jamaicensis tripartitus (Grote, 1886); Smerinthus jamaicensis clarkii Franck, 1913; Smerinthus jamaicensis flavitincta (Nixon, 1912); Smerinthus jamaicensis gamma Cockerell, 1925

= Smerinthus jamaicensis =

Twin-spotted sphinx

Species of moth

Smerinthus jamaicensis, the twin-spotted sphinx, is a moth of the family Sphingidae. The species was first described by Dru Drury in 1773.

== Description ==
It has a wingspan of 1 3/4–3 1/4 inches (4.5–8.3 cm), with the outer margins of the forewings unevenly scalloped, but with the coastal margin of the hindwings being almost straight. Males have gray with black and white markings on their forewings, while females are yellowish brown with dark brown and white markings.

Both sexes have red hindwings with a pale yellow border. Sometimes a blue patch may appear as a single eyespot or it may be divided by black bands, creating two or three eyespots. Adult moths are nocturnal and do not feed.

Larvae are polyphageous (eat a wide variety of plants); known hosts include willow (Salix), poplar (Populus), birch (Betula), ash (Fraxinus), elm (Ulmus), apple (Malus), and plums (Prunus).

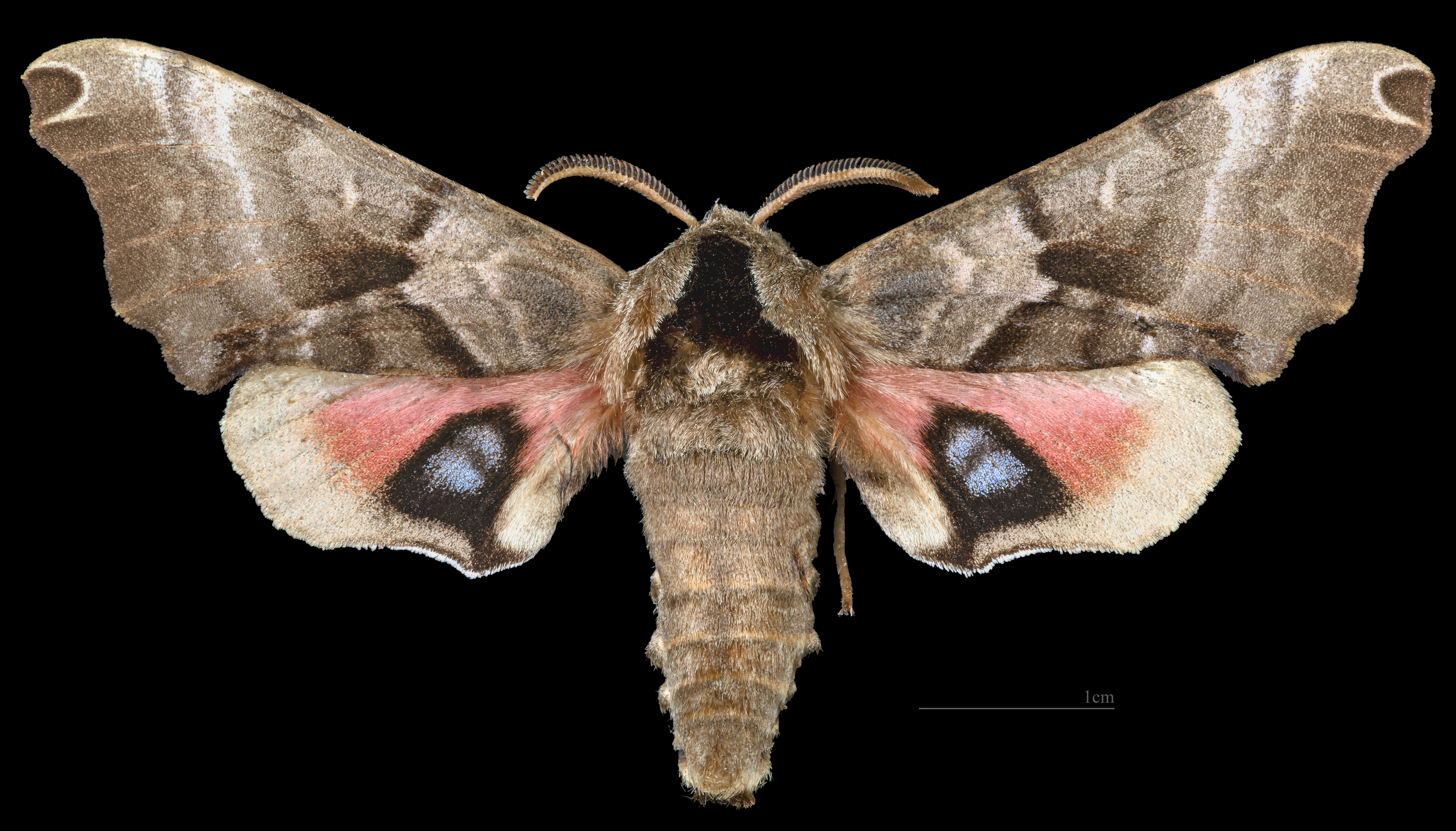
Smerinthus jamaicensis ♂

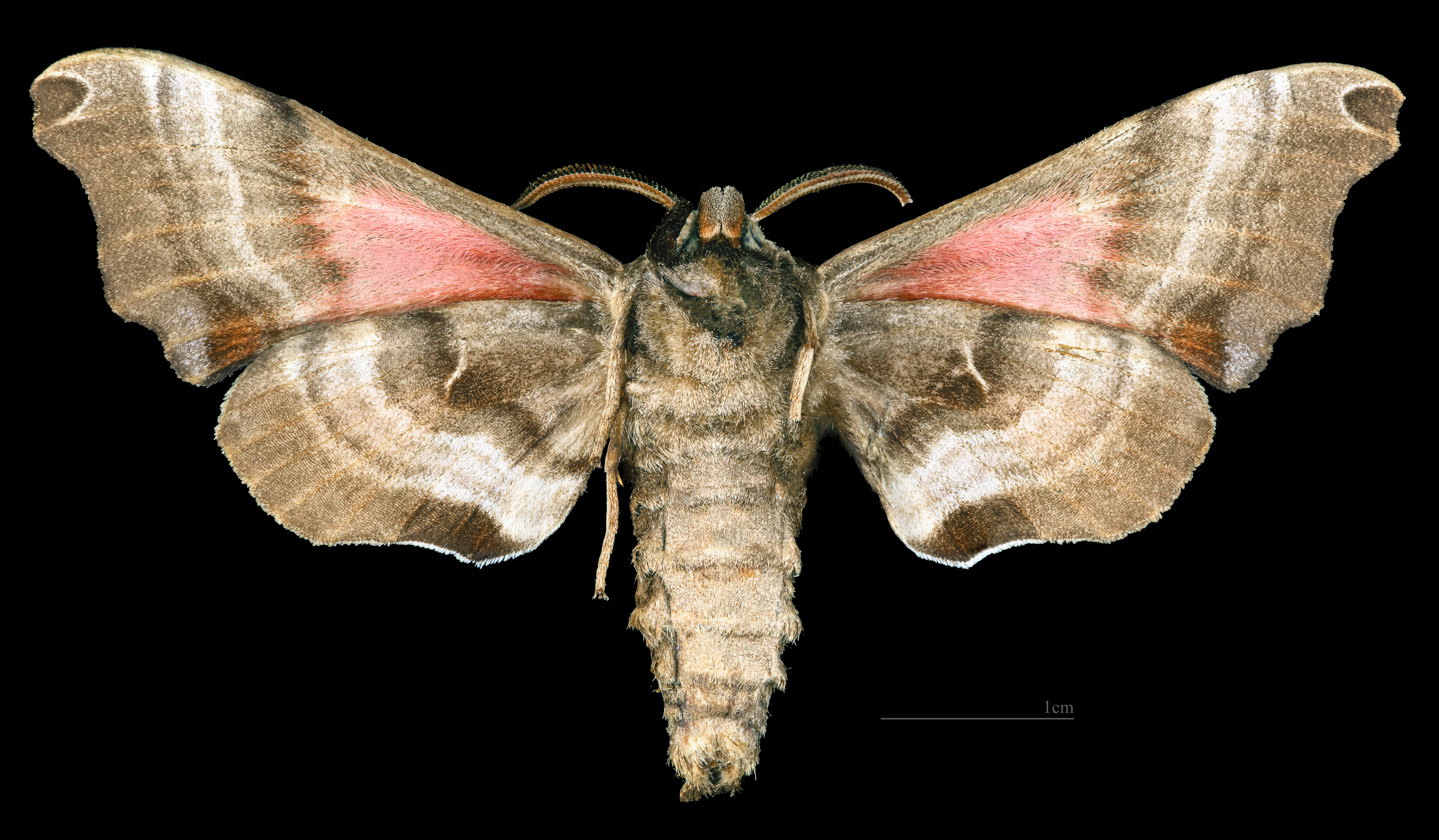
Smerinthus jamaicensis ♂ △

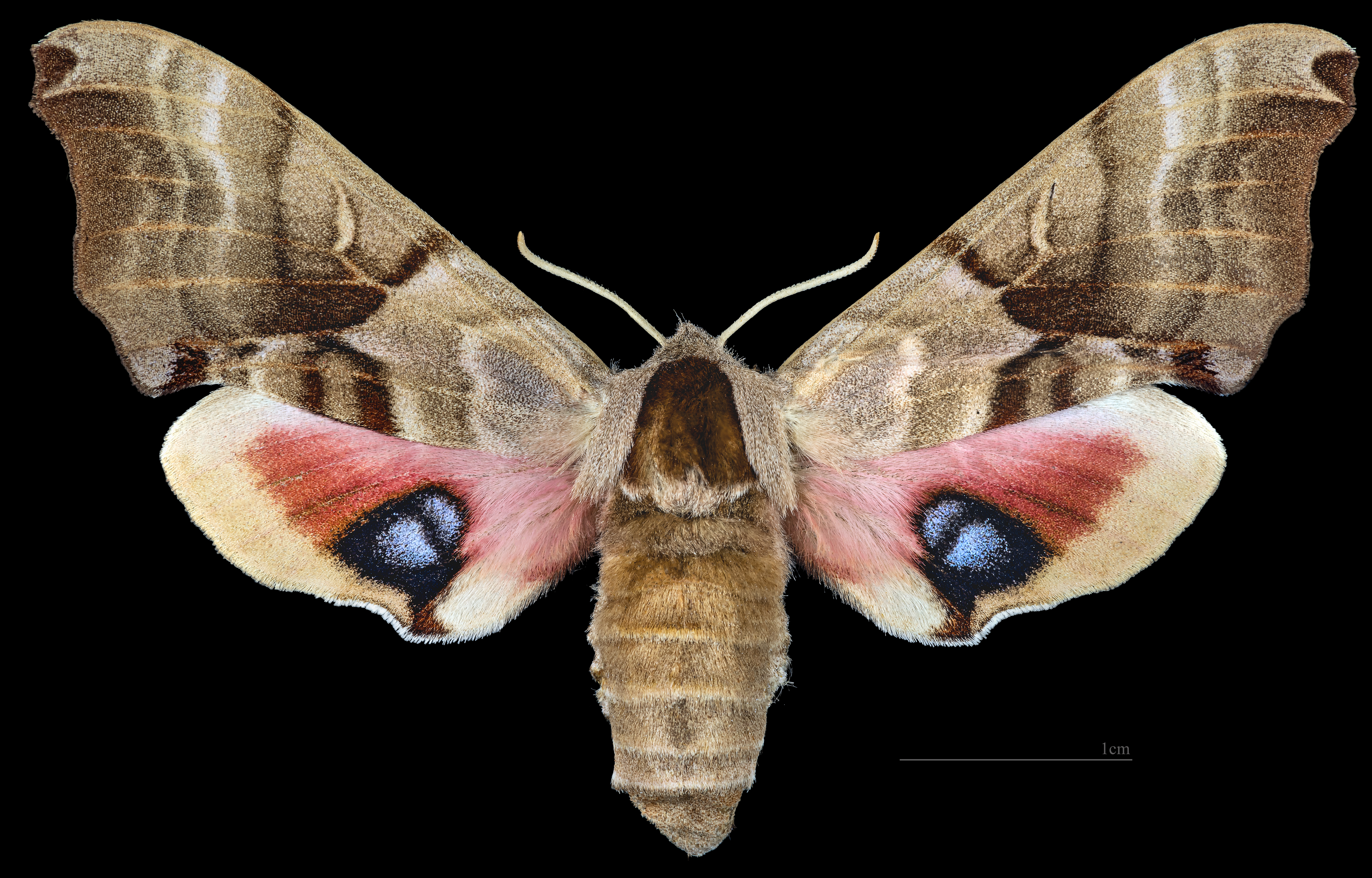
Smerinthus jamaicensis ♀ △

== See also ==
- Smerinthus cerisyi
- Smerinthus saliceti
