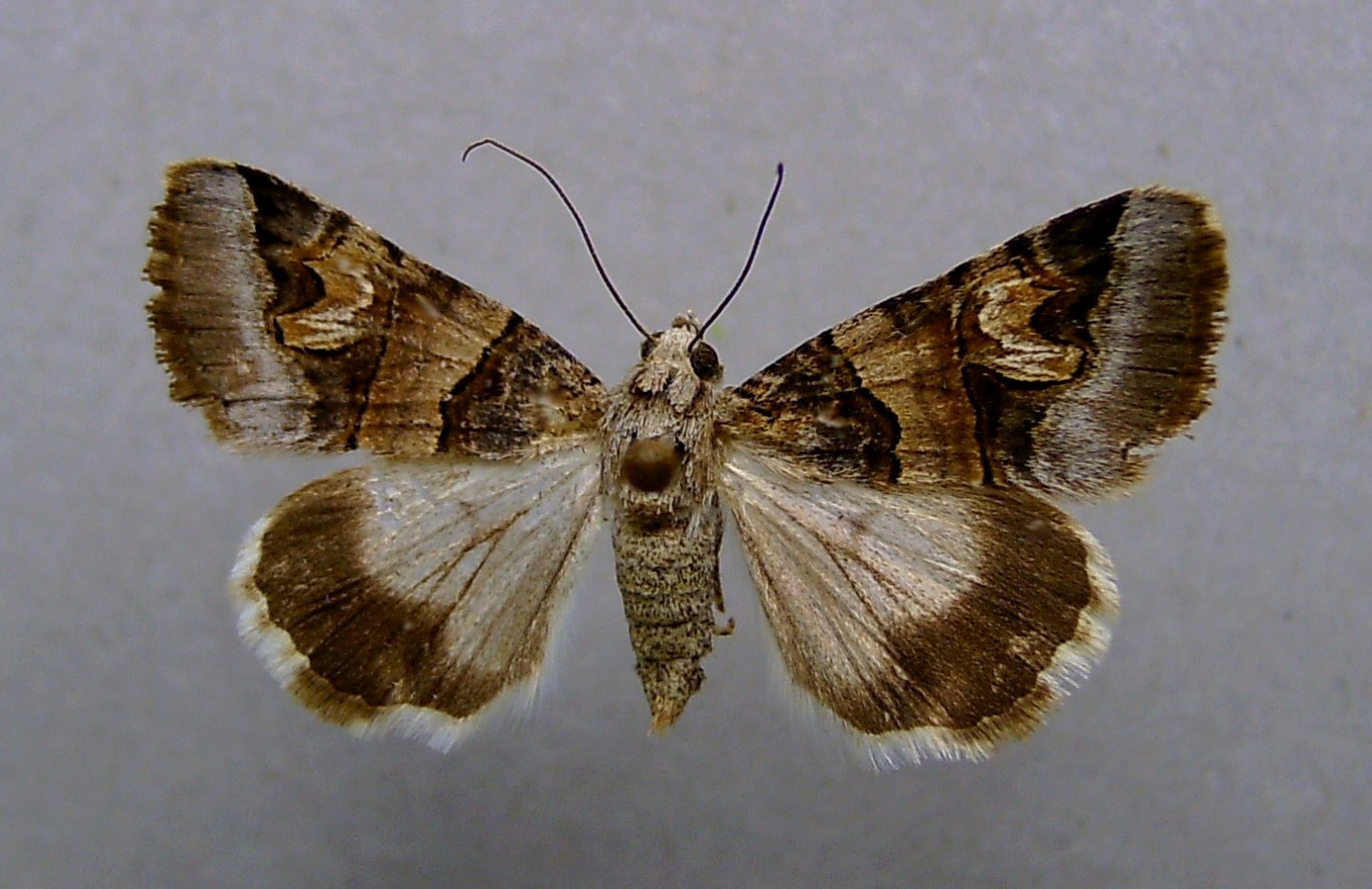

Scientific classification
- Domain: Eukaryota
- Kingdom: Animalia
- Phylum: Arthropoda
- Class: Insecta
- Order: Lepidoptera
- Superfamily: Noctuoidea
- Family: Erebidae
- Genus: Drasteria
- Species: D. cailino

Binomial name
- Drasteria cailino (Lefèbvre, 1827)

Synonyms
- Heliotis cailino Lefèbvre, 1827; Leucanitis caylino Lederer, 1857; Leucanitis cailino obscura Staudinger, 1901; Leucanitis cailino f. baigakumensis John, 1917; Aleucanitis cailino

= Drasteria cailino =

Species of moth

Drasteria cailino is a moth of the family Erebidae first described by Alexandre Louis Lefèbvre de Cérisy in 1827. It is found in southern Europe, the Near East and Middle East up to the western Himalayas in the east. In the Levant, several isolated populations are present in Lebanon, Syria and Israel.

There are two generations per year. Adults are on wing in from May to July and in early autumn.

The larvae feed on Salix viminalis and Rosa canina.

== Subspecies ==
- Drasteria cailino cailino
- Drasteria cailino medialba Wiltshire, 1961
- Drasteria cailino tropicalis Hacker, 1999 (Saudi Arabia, Yemen)
- Drasteria cailino orientalis Hacker, 1996 (Pakistan)
