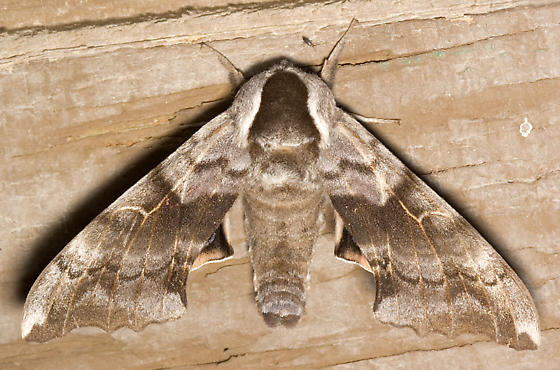

Scientific classification
- Kingdom: Animalia
- Phylum: Arthropoda
- Clade: Pancrustacea
- Class: Insecta
- Order: Lepidoptera
- Family: Sphingidae
- Genus: Smerinthus
- Species: S. cerisyi

Binomial name
- Smerinthus cerisyi Kirby, 1837

Synonyms
- Smerinthus vancouverensis Butler, 1876; Smerinthus cerisyi borealis Clark, 1929; Smerinthus cerisyi nigrescens Clark, 1919; Smerinthus cerisyi pallidulus (Edwards, 1875)

= Smerinthus cerisyi =

One-eyed sphinx

Species of moth

Smerinthus cerisyi, the one-eyed sphinx or Cerisy's sphinx, is a moth of the family Sphingidae. The species was first described by William Kirby who named the species in honor of Alexandre Louis Lefèbvre de Cérisy in 1837.

== Distribution ==
It is known from south-eastern Alaska, the southern parts of all Canadian provinces and in the northern border states of the United States south into northern Indiana, Pennsylvania and Ohio and along the west coast to southern California, eastward to the Rocky Mountains and into western New Mexico north to western North Dakota. It has also been recorded from Illinois and as far south as Missouri.

== Description ==
The wingspan is 60-90 mm and the hindwing has a blue eyespot with a black center. The species is univoltine (has a single generation per year) and adults can be found through much of the summer. The adult moths do not feed. The moths are nocturnal and are attracted to light.

The larvae feed on willow (Salix), poplar (Populus), pear (Pyrus communis), plum (Prunus), and snowberry (Symphoricarpos).

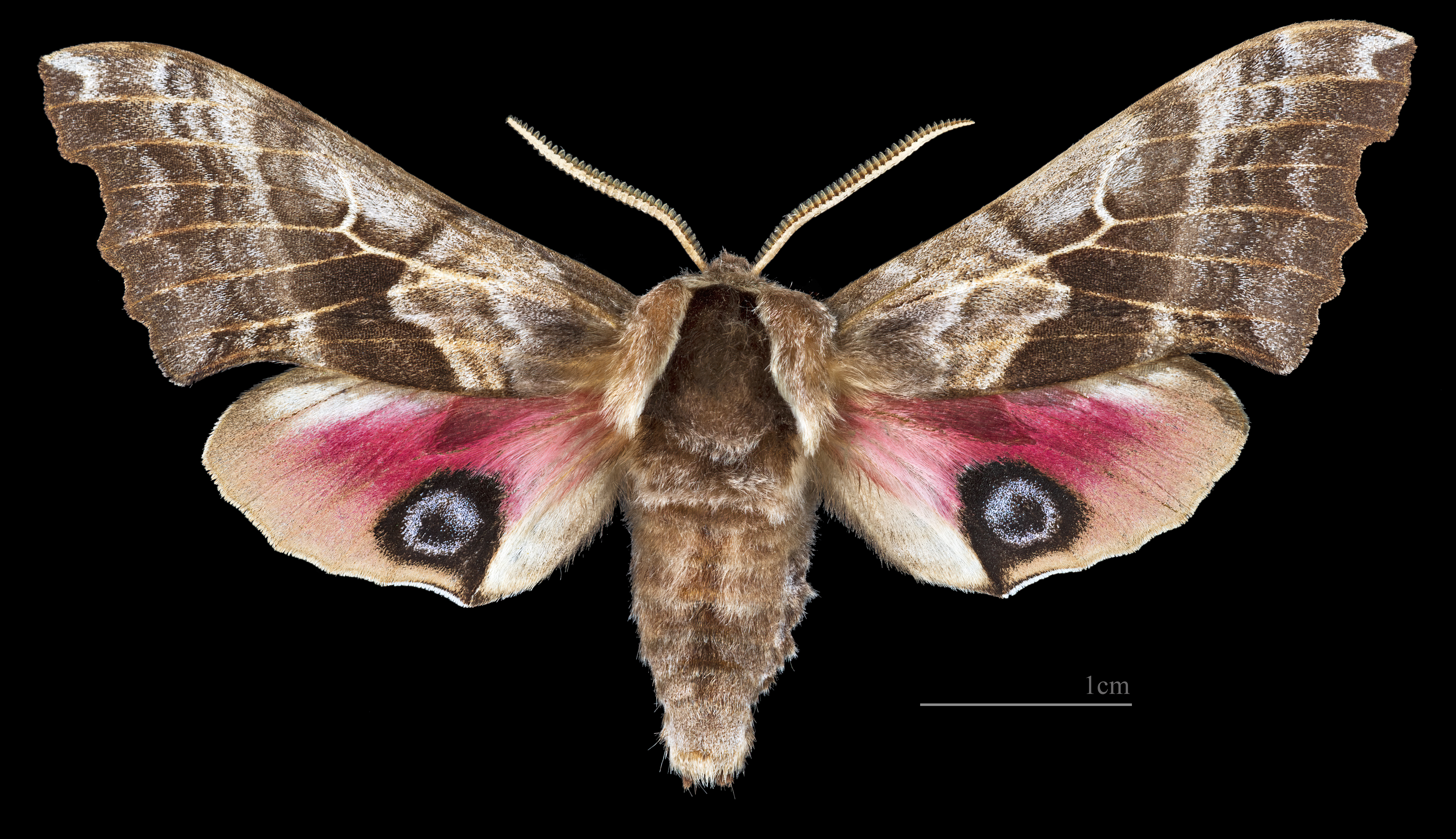
Male dorsal

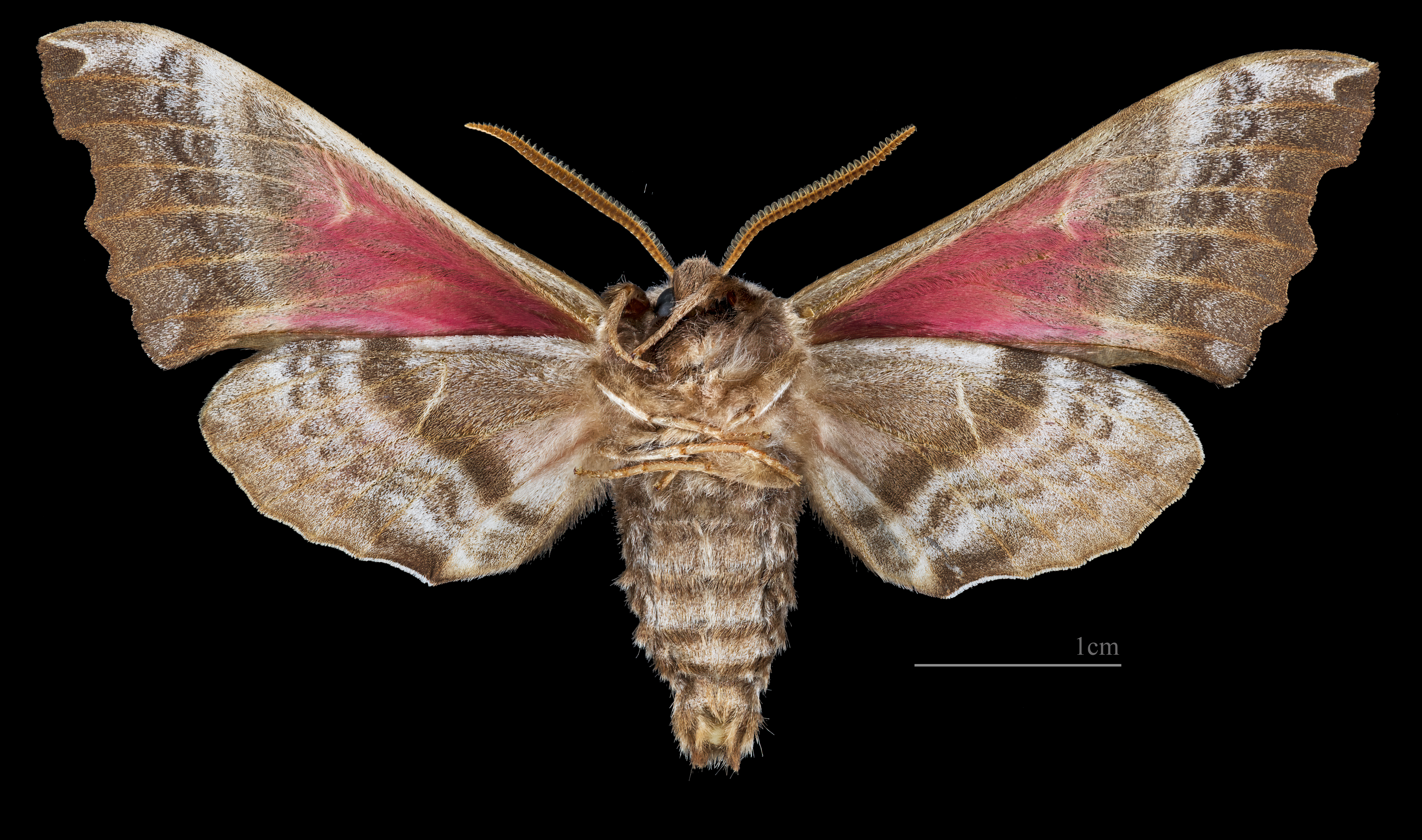
Male ventral
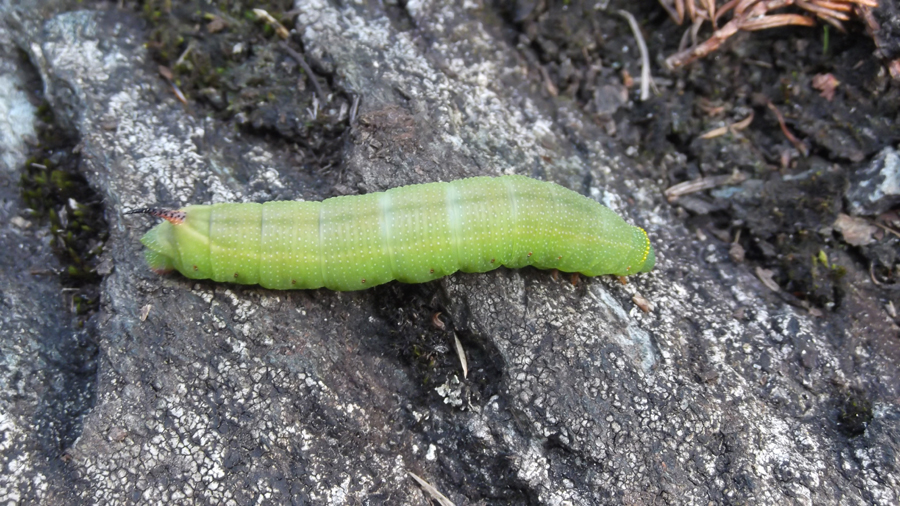
Caterpillar

== Taxonomy ==
Smerinthus ophthalmica, formerly listed as a synonym of Smerinthus cerisyi, is thought to be a valid species. In 2018, Smerinthus astarte was described as a separate species which was also formerly a synonym. It mostly replaces Smerinthus cerisyi in the west coast of the US.

== See also ==
- Smerinthus jamaicensis
- Smerinthus saliceti
- Smerinthus ocellata
