= Smerinthus visinskasi =

Scientific classification
- Kingdom: Animalia
- Phylum: Arthropoda
- Clade: Pancrustacea
- Class: Insecta
- Order: Lepidoptera
- Family: Sphingidae
- Genus: Smerinthus
- Species: S. visinskasi

Binomial name
- Smerinthus visinskasi Zolotuhin & Saldaitis, 2009

Species of moth

Smerinthus visinskasi is a species of moth of the family Sphingidae. It is known from north-western Kazakhstan.
