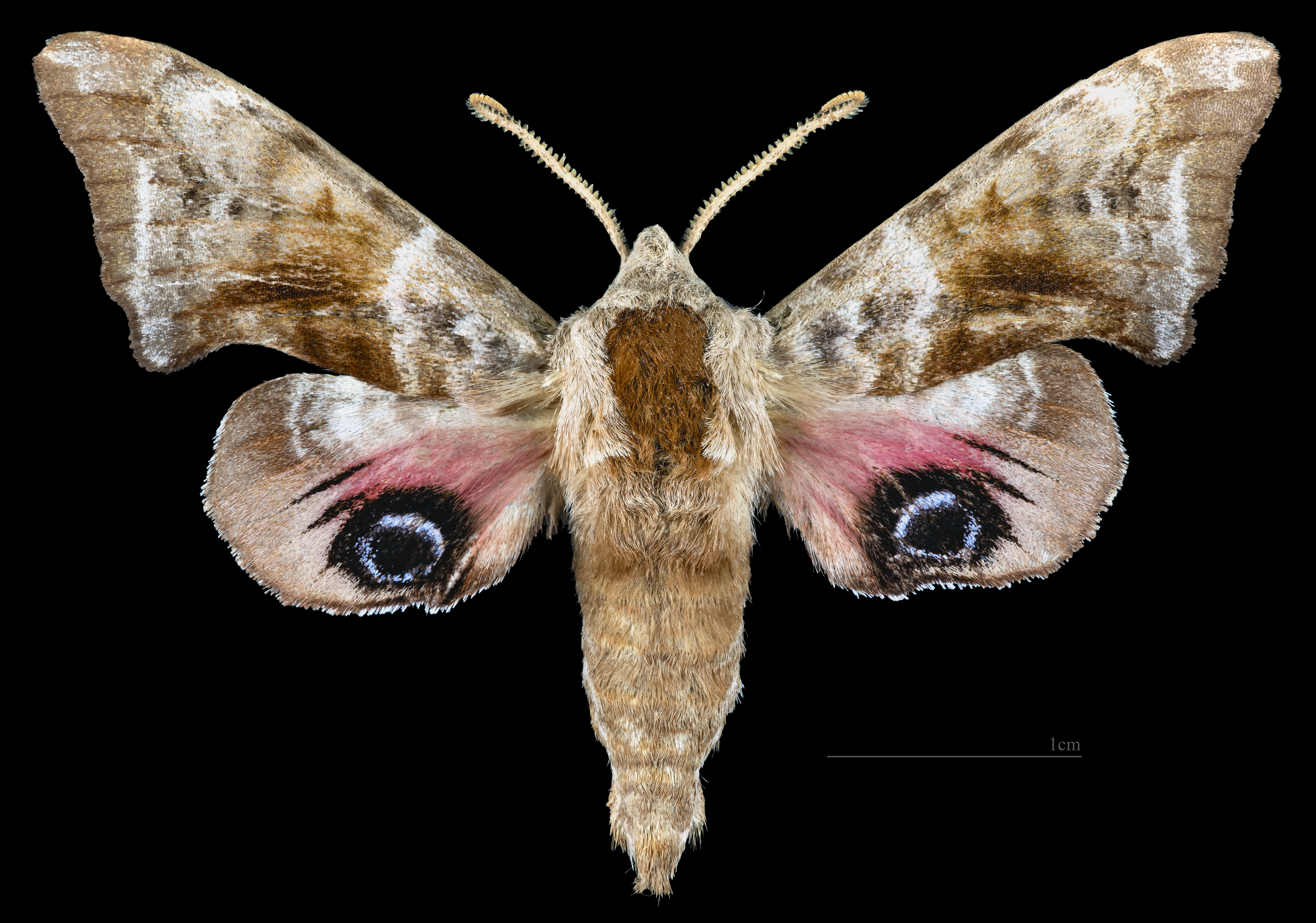
- Male dorsal
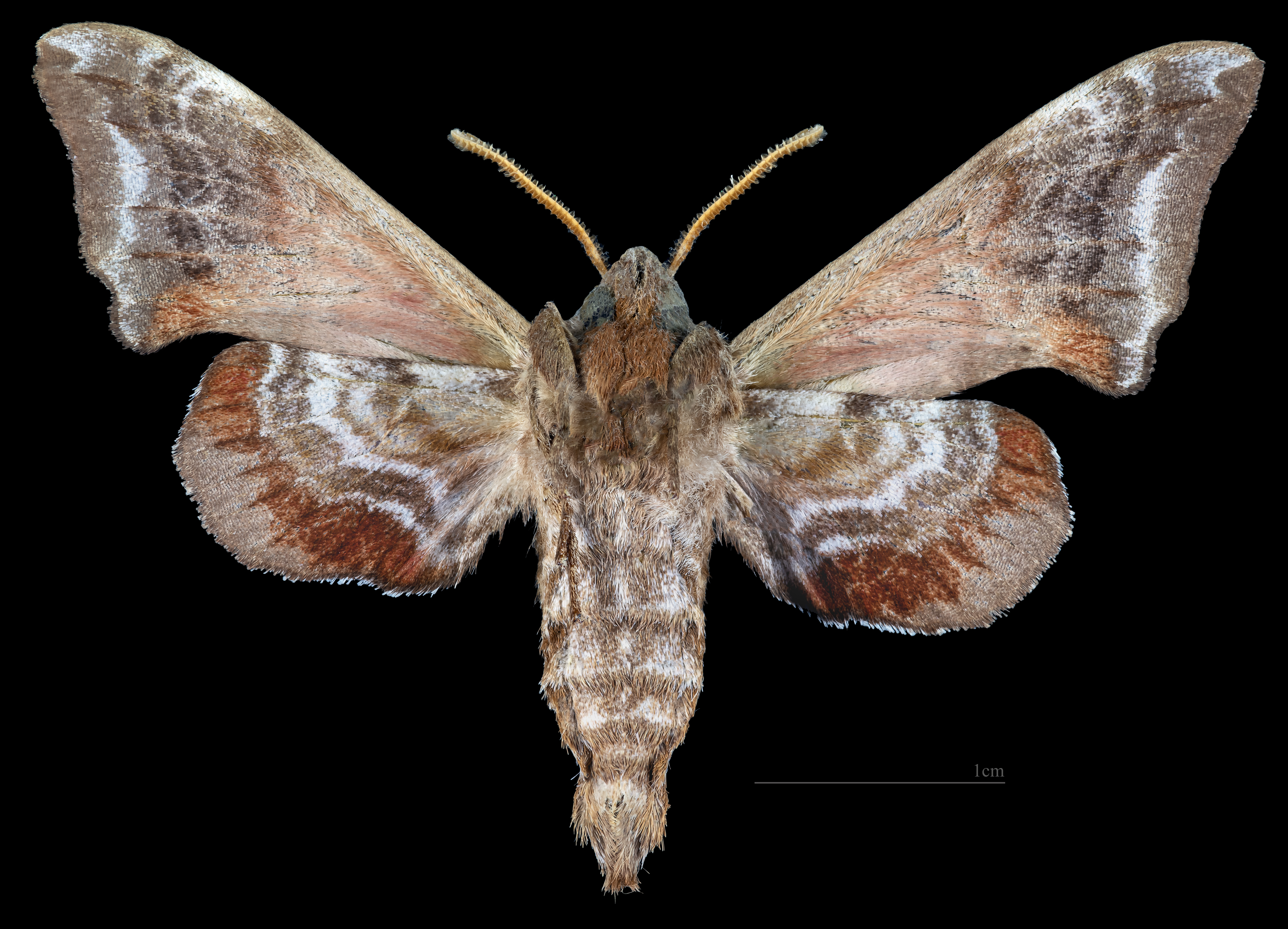
- Male ventral

Scientific classification
- Domain: Eukaryota
- Kingdom: Animalia
- Phylum: Arthropoda
- Class: Insecta
- Order: Lepidoptera
- Family: Sphingidae
- Genus: Smerinthus
- Species: S. tokyonis

Binomial name
- Smerinthus tokyonis Matsumura, 1921

= Smerinthus tokyonis =

Species of moth

Smerinthus tokyonis, the Japanese eyed hawkmoth, is a moth of the family Sphingidae. It was described by Shōnen Matsumura in 1921. It is known from Honshu and Shikoku in Japan.

Adults have been recorded in June.
