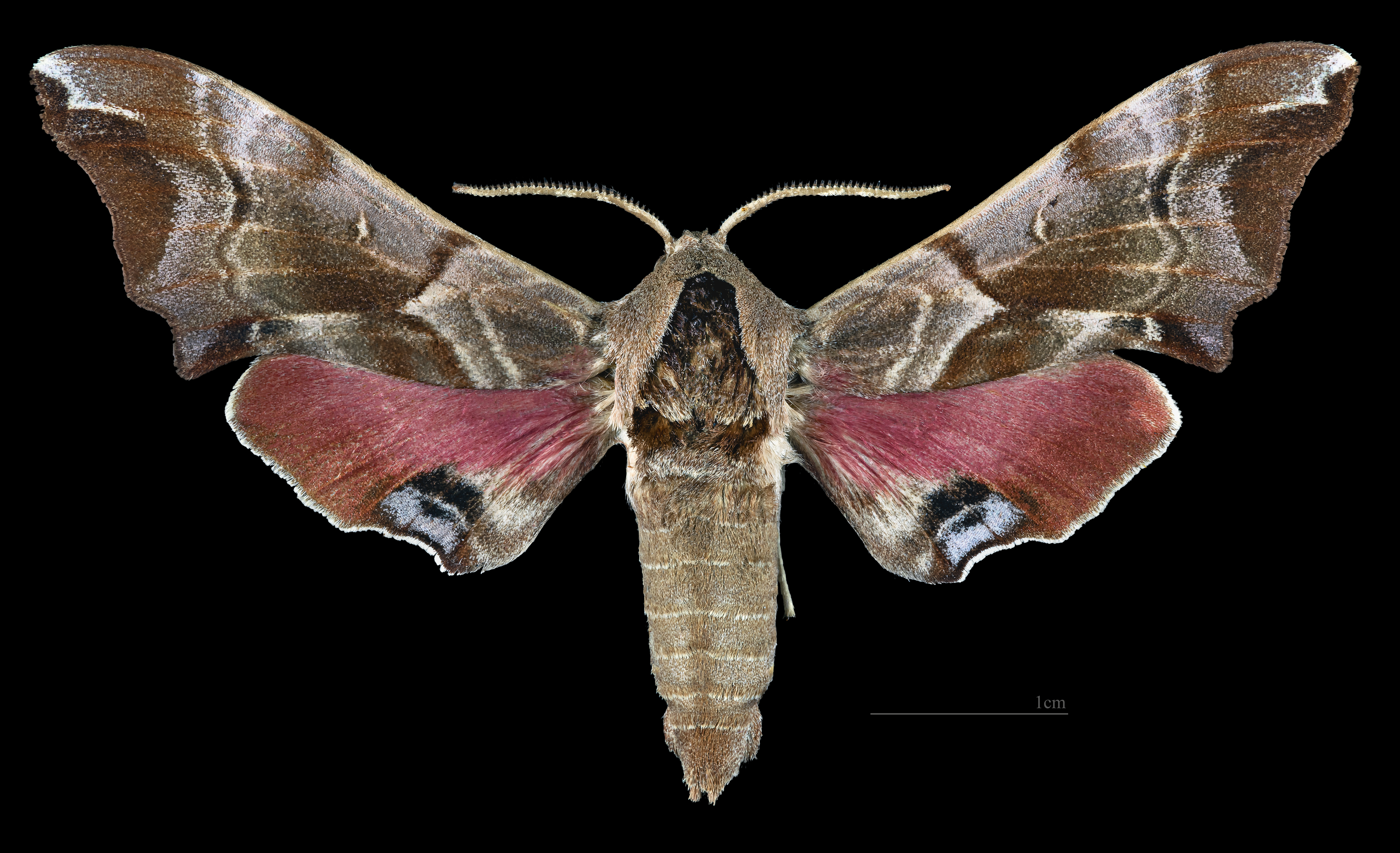
- Male dorsal
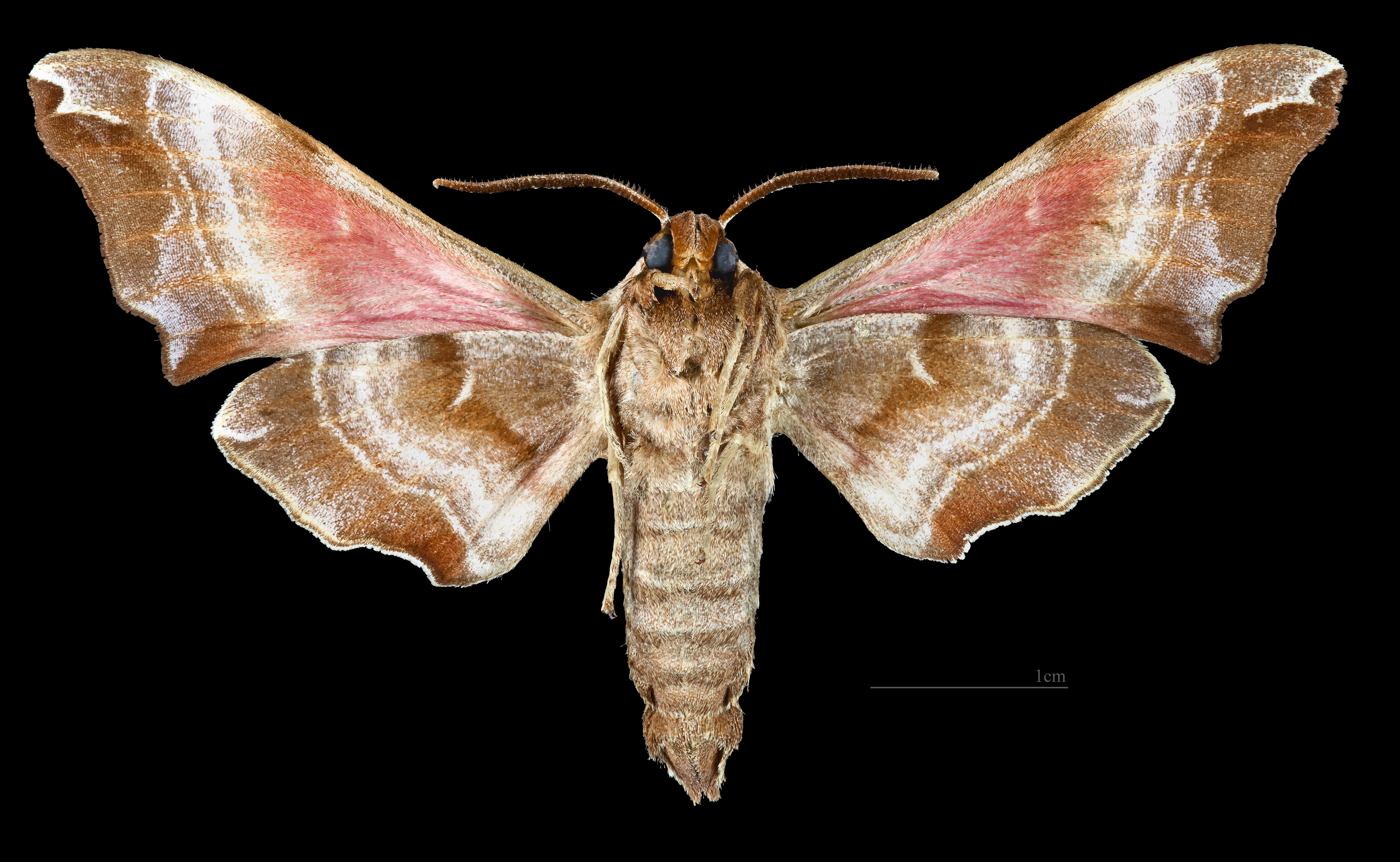
- Male ventral

Scientific classification
- Kingdom: Animalia
- Phylum: Arthropoda
- Clade: Pancrustacea
- Class: Insecta
- Order: Lepidoptera
- Family: Sphingidae
- Genus: Smerinthus
- Species: S. kindermannii

Binomial name
- Smerinthus kindermannii Lederer, 1857

Synonyms
- Smerinthus kindermanni var. orbata Grum-Grshimailo, 1890; Smerinthus kindermannii var. obsoleta Staudinger, 1901; Smerinthus kindermannii obscura (Closs, 1917); Smerinthus kindermannii meridionalis Gehlen, 1931

= Smerinthus kindermannii =

Species of moth

Smerinthus kindermannii, the southern eyed hawkmoth, is a species of moth of the family Sphingidae. It is found throughout the central Palaearctic Region, from Turkey, Cyprus and Lebanon, east through Iraq, Iran, Afghanistan and northern Pakistan to Kashmir. From there, north and north-east through Turkmenistan, Uzbekistan, Tajikistan, Kyrgyzstan and Kazakhstan, to north-western China (Xinjiang, Ningxia, Gansu). It has also been reported from Israel and Kuwait.

The wingspan is 70–80 mm.

The larvae feed on Salix and Populus species.

== Subspecies ==
- Smerinthus kindermannii kindermannii
- Smerinthus kindermannii gehleni Eitschberger & Lukhtanov, 1996 (India)
- Smerinthus kindermannii iliensis Eitschberger & Lukhtanov, 1996 (Kazakhstan)
- Smerinthus kindermannii obsoleta Staudinger, 1901 (China)
- Smerinthus kindermannii orbata Grum-Grshimailo, 1890 (Uzbekistan)
