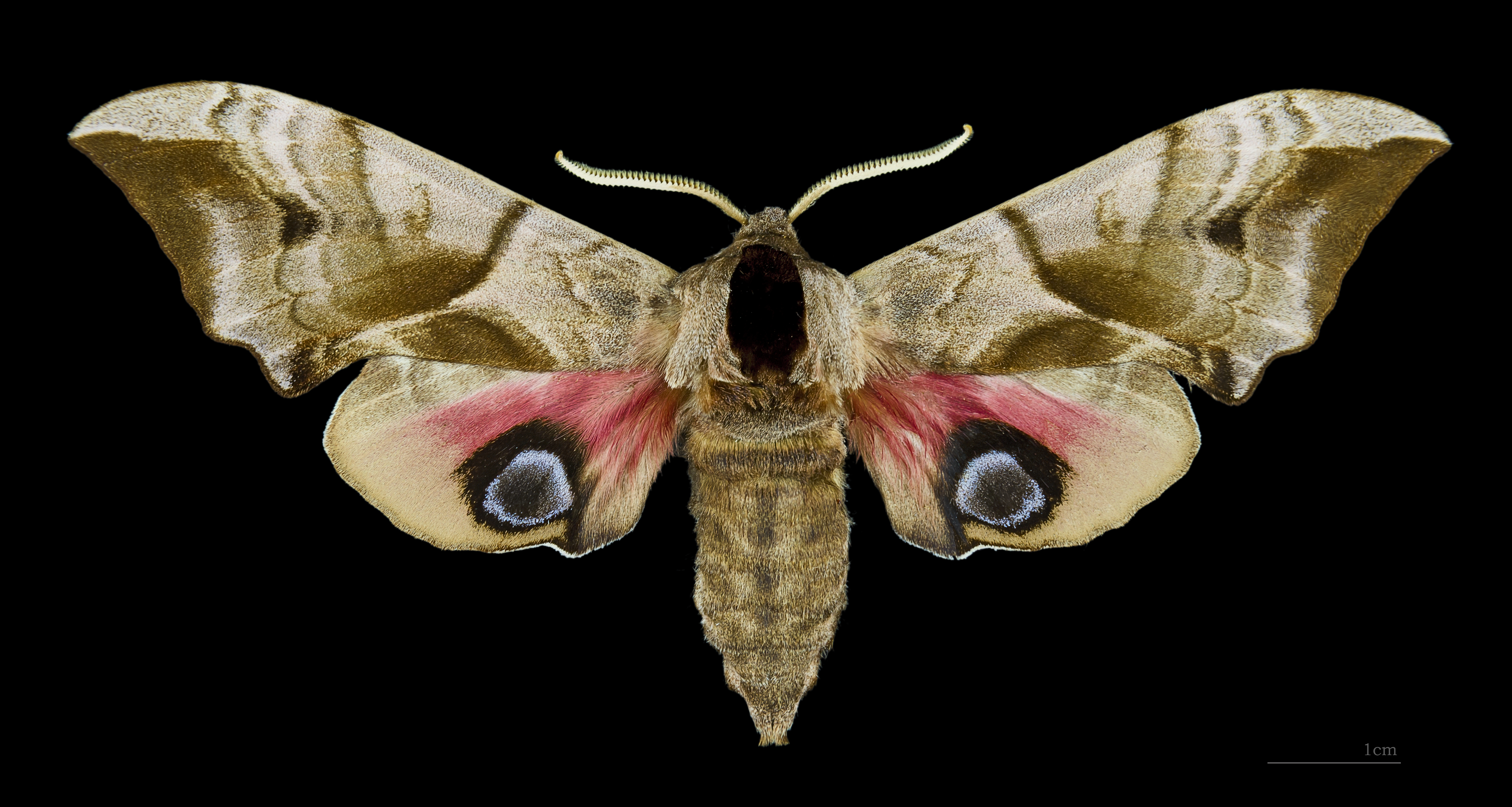
- Smerinthus ocellatus, type species for the genus

Scientific classification
- Domain: Eukaryota
- Kingdom: Animalia
- Phylum: Arthropoda
- Class: Insecta
- Order: Lepidoptera
- Family: Sphingidae
- Tribe: Smerinthini
- Genus: Smerinthus; Latreille, 1802

Synonyms
- Bebroptera Sodoffsky, 1837; Bellia Tutt, 1902; Bellinca Strand, 1943; Copismerinthus Grote, 1892; Daddia Tutt, 1902; Dilina Dalman, 1816; Eusmerinthus Grote, 1877; Merinthus Meigen, 1830; Nicholsonia Tutt, 1902; Niia Strand, 1943

= Smerinthus =

Genus of moths

Smerinthus is a Holarctic genus of hawkmoths in the family Sphingidae. It was described by Pierre André Latreille in 1802. Adults have conspicuous eyespots on the hindwings.

The pattern and coloration of the forewing typically resembles dried leaves rather than tree bark as in many other sphinx moths. While larvae feed on a variety of host plants, adults have reduced or absent mouthparts and do not feed at all.

== Species ==
- Smerinthus astarte Strecker, [1885]
- Smerinthus caecus Menetries, 1857
- Smerinthus cerisyi Kirby, 1837
- Smerinthus jamaicensis (Drury, 1773)
- Smerinthus kindermannii Lederer, 1853
- Smerinthus minor Mell, 1937
- Smerinthus ocellatus (Linnaeus, 1758)
- Smerinthus ophthalmica Boisduval, 1855
- Smerinthus planus Walker, 1856
- Smerinthus saliceti Boisduval, 1875
- Smerinthus szechuanus (Clark, 1938)
- Smerinthus tokyonis Matsumura, 1921
- Smerinthus visinskasi Zolotuhin & Saldaitis, 2009
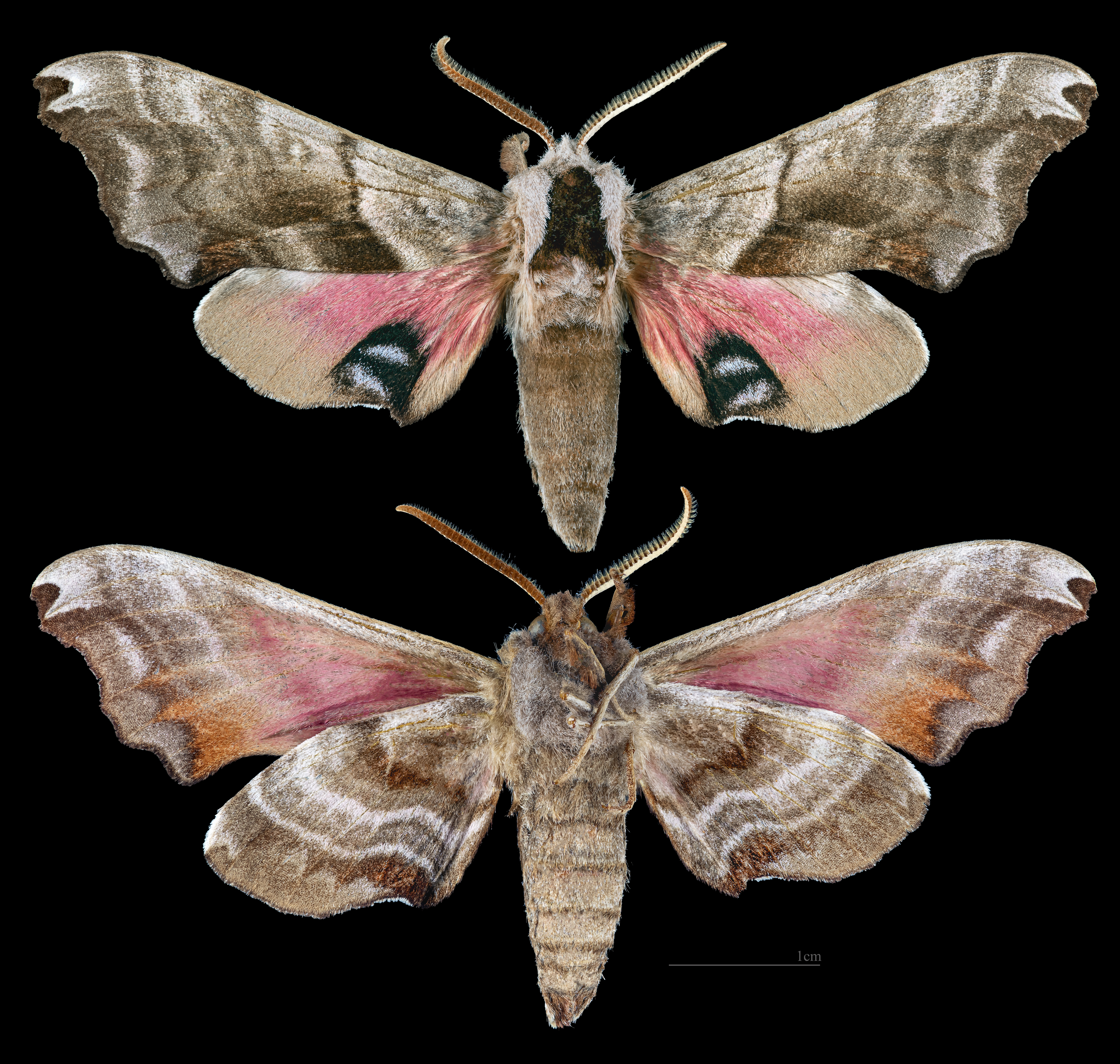
Smerinthus caecus

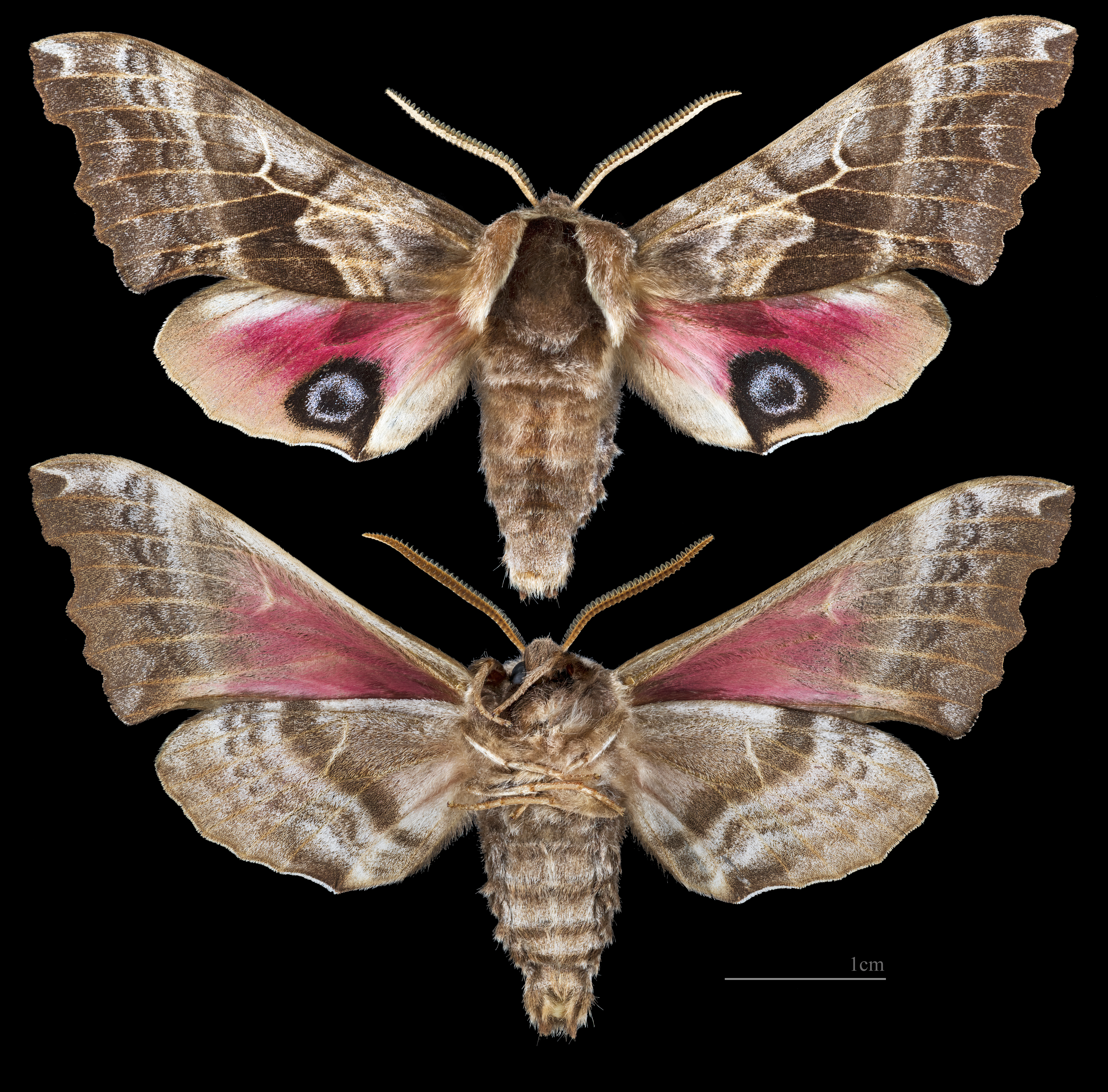
Smerinthus cerisyi

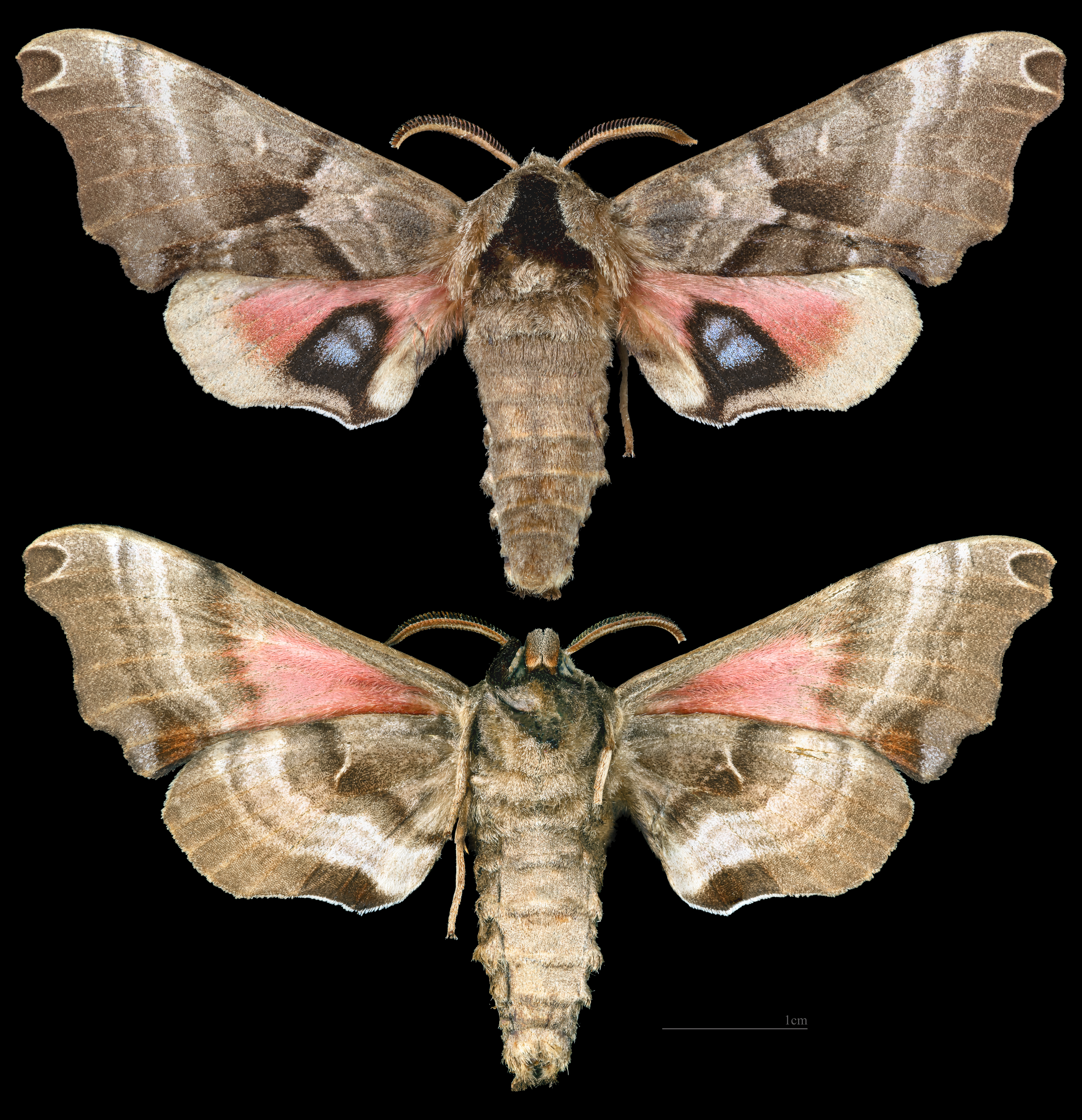
Smerinthus jamaicensis

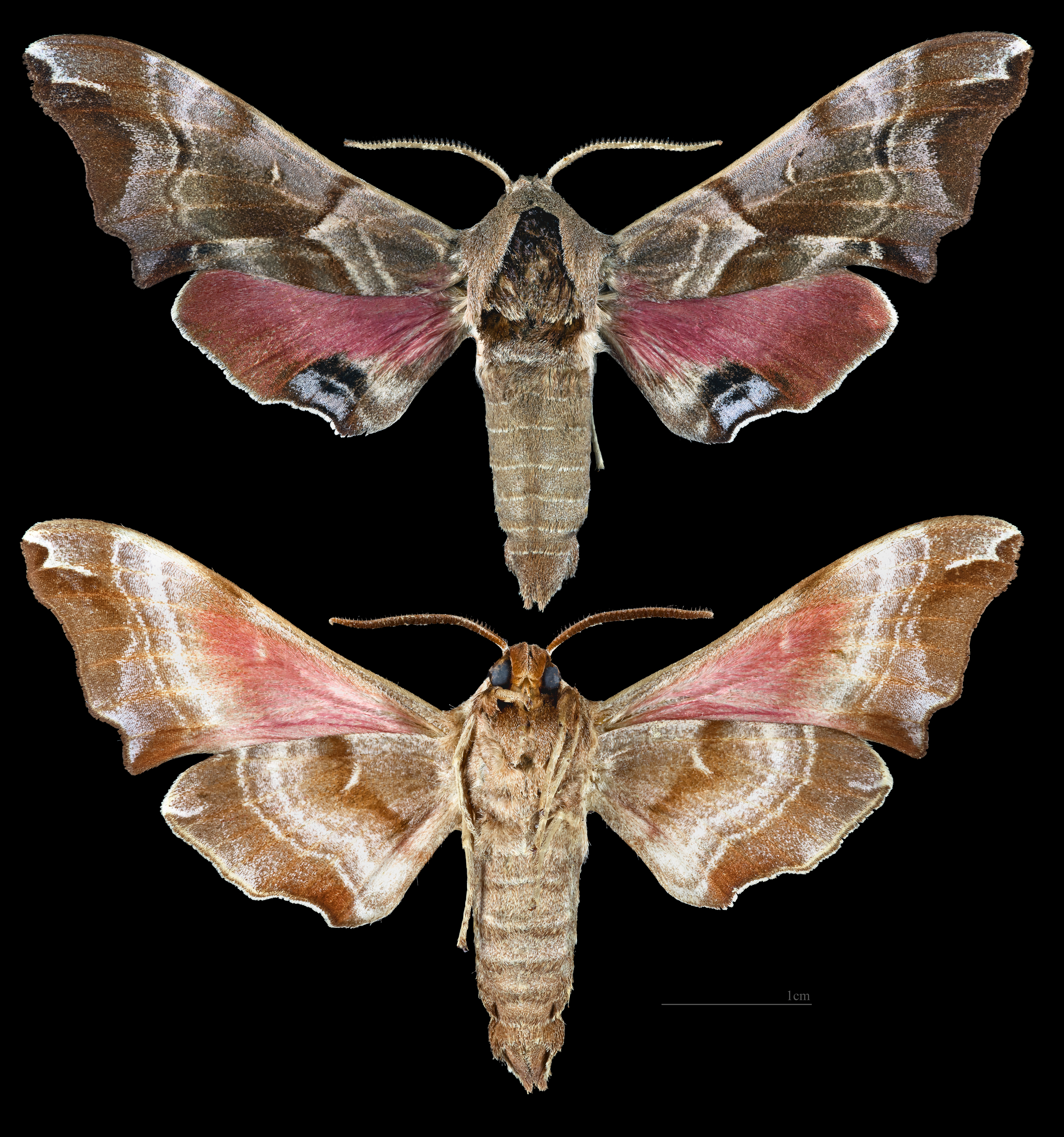
Smerinthus kindermannii

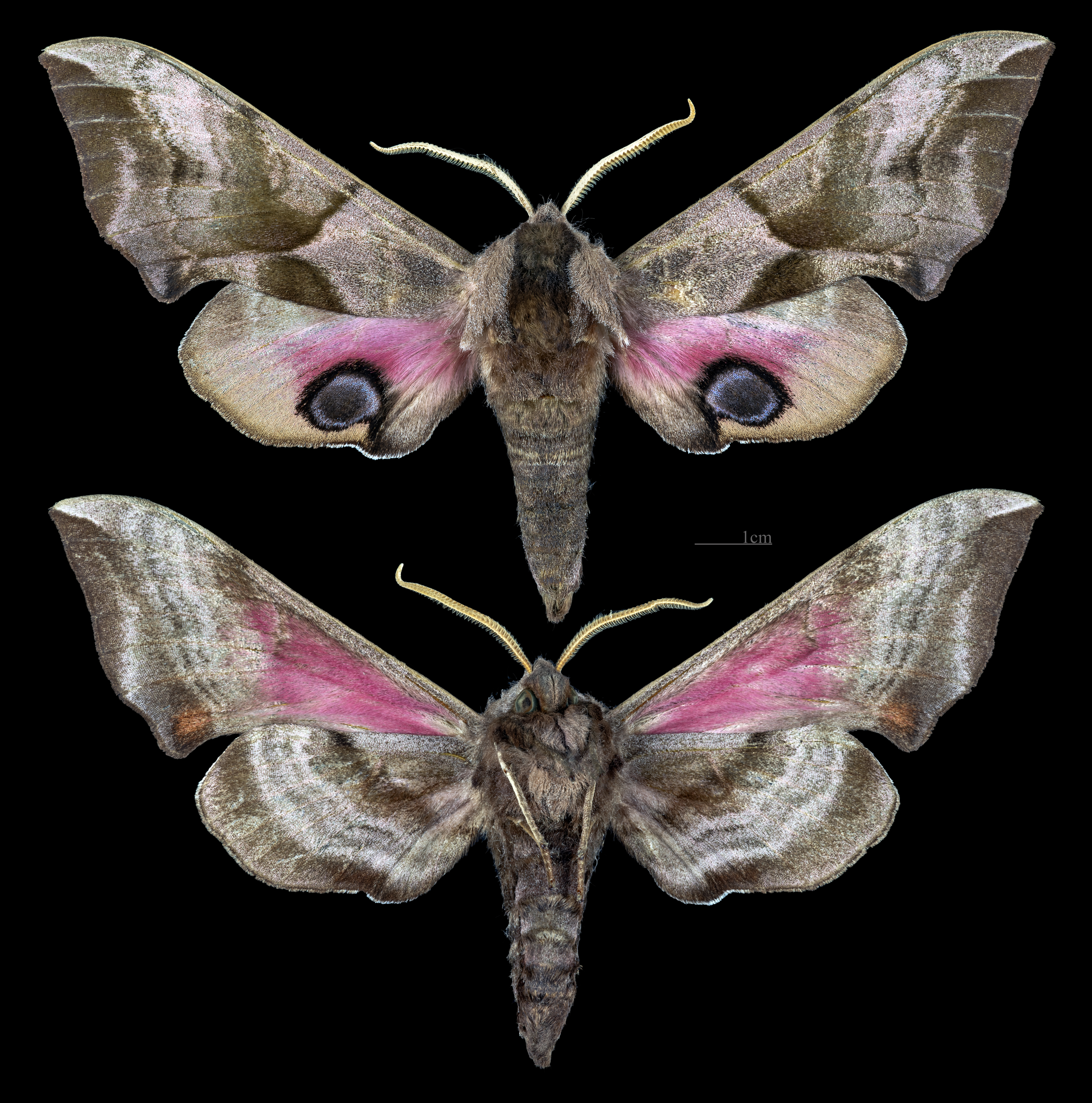
Smerinthus ocellatus

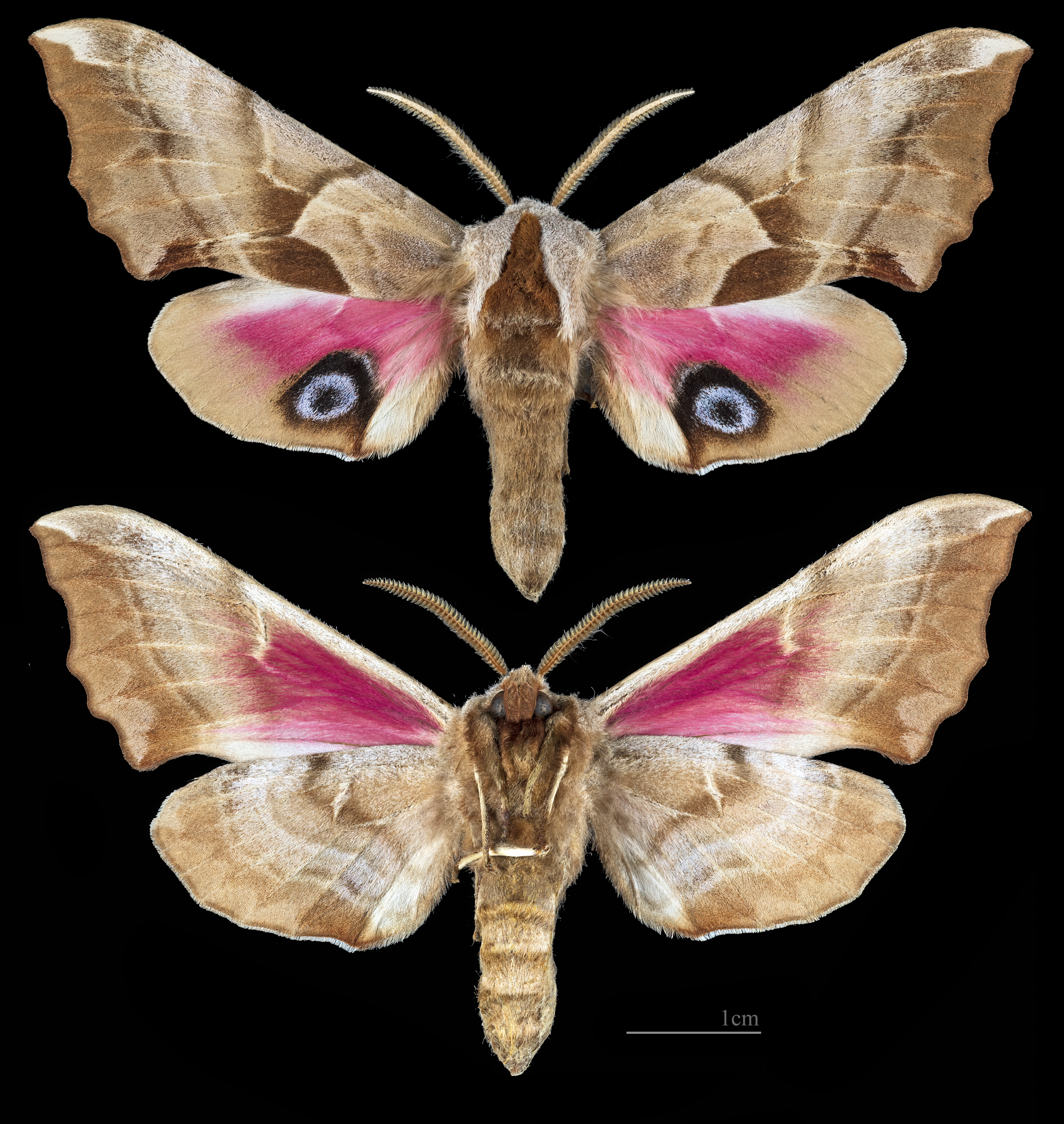
Smerinthus ophthalmica

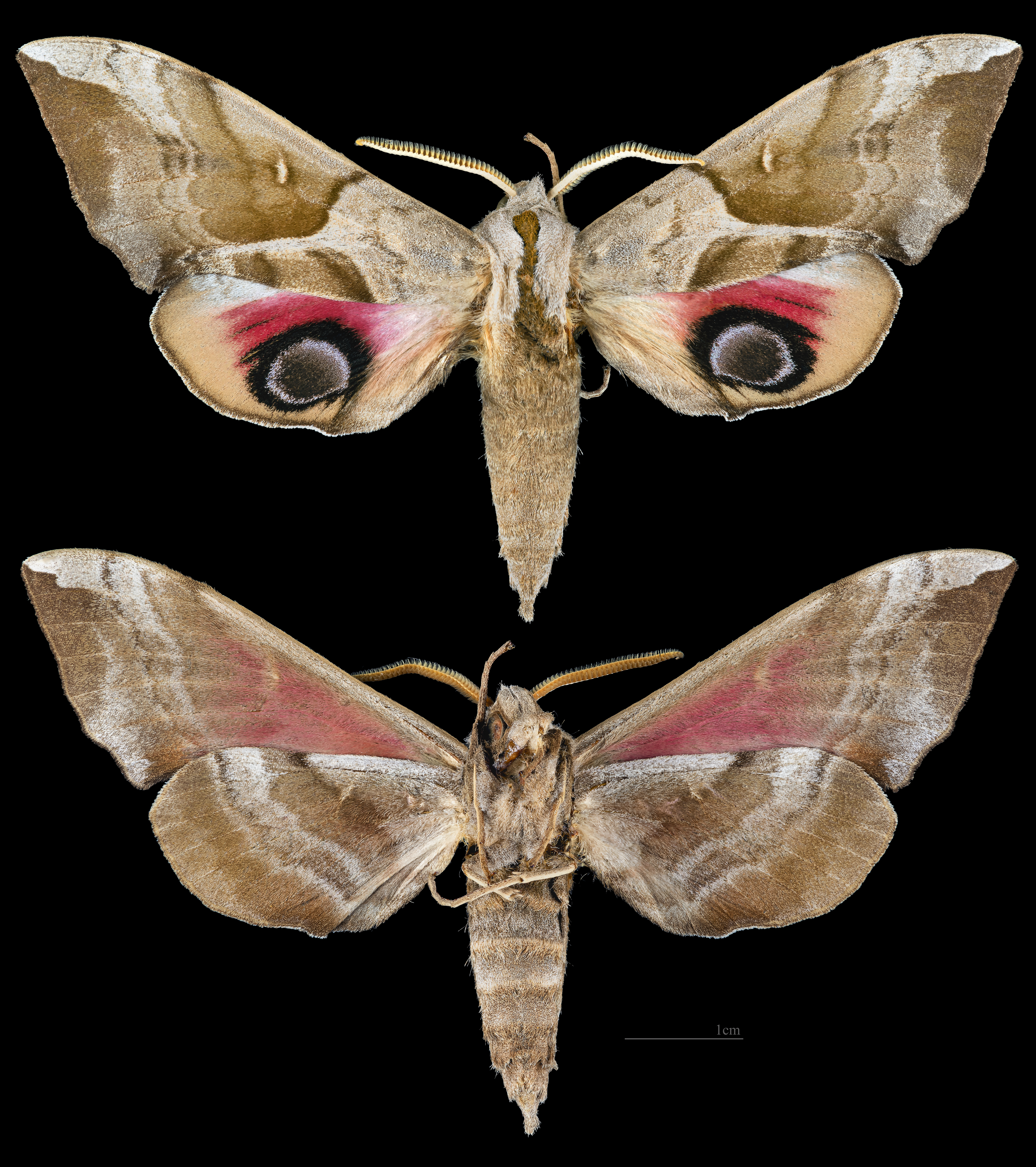
Smerinthus planus

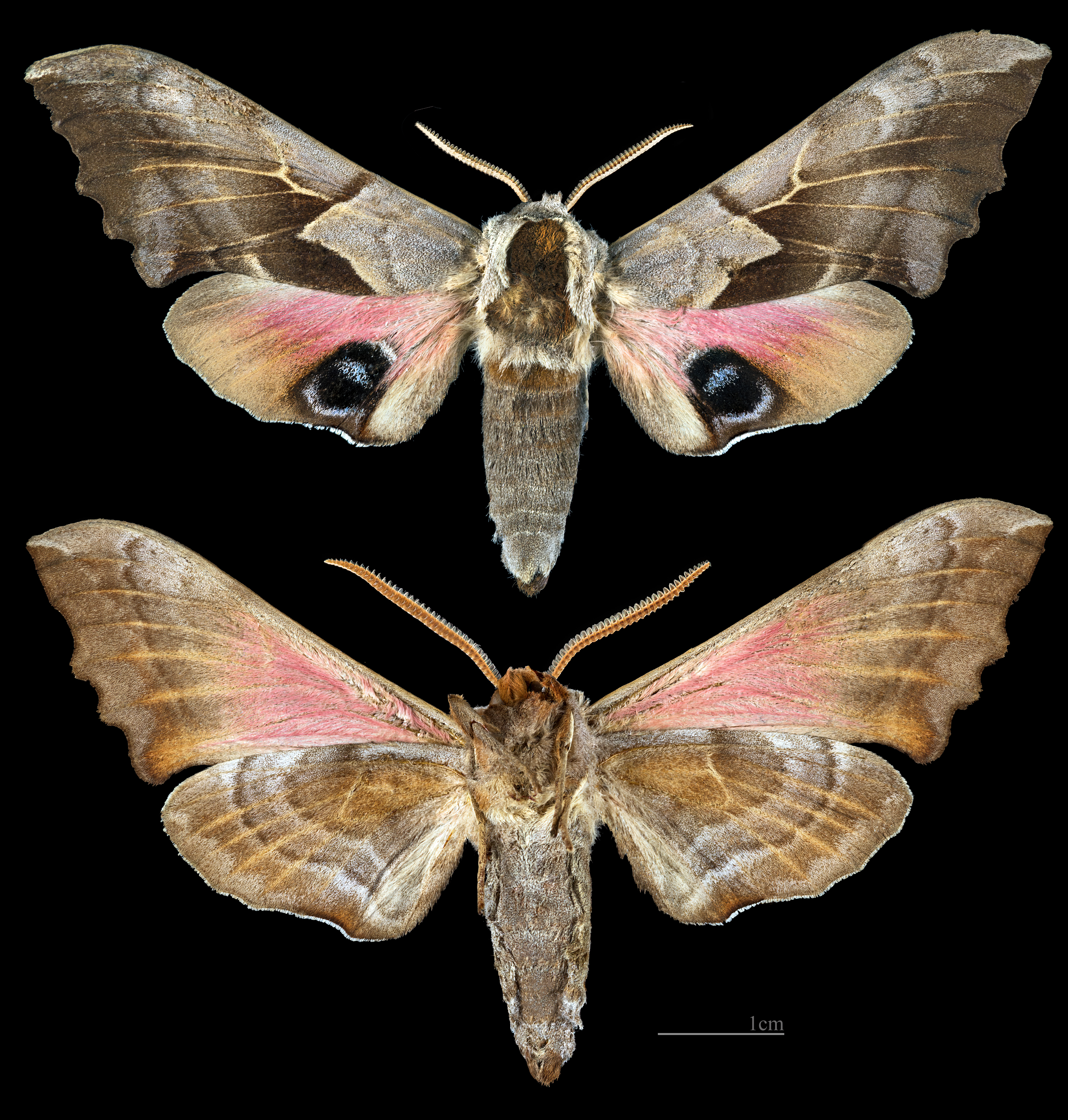
Smerinthus saliceti

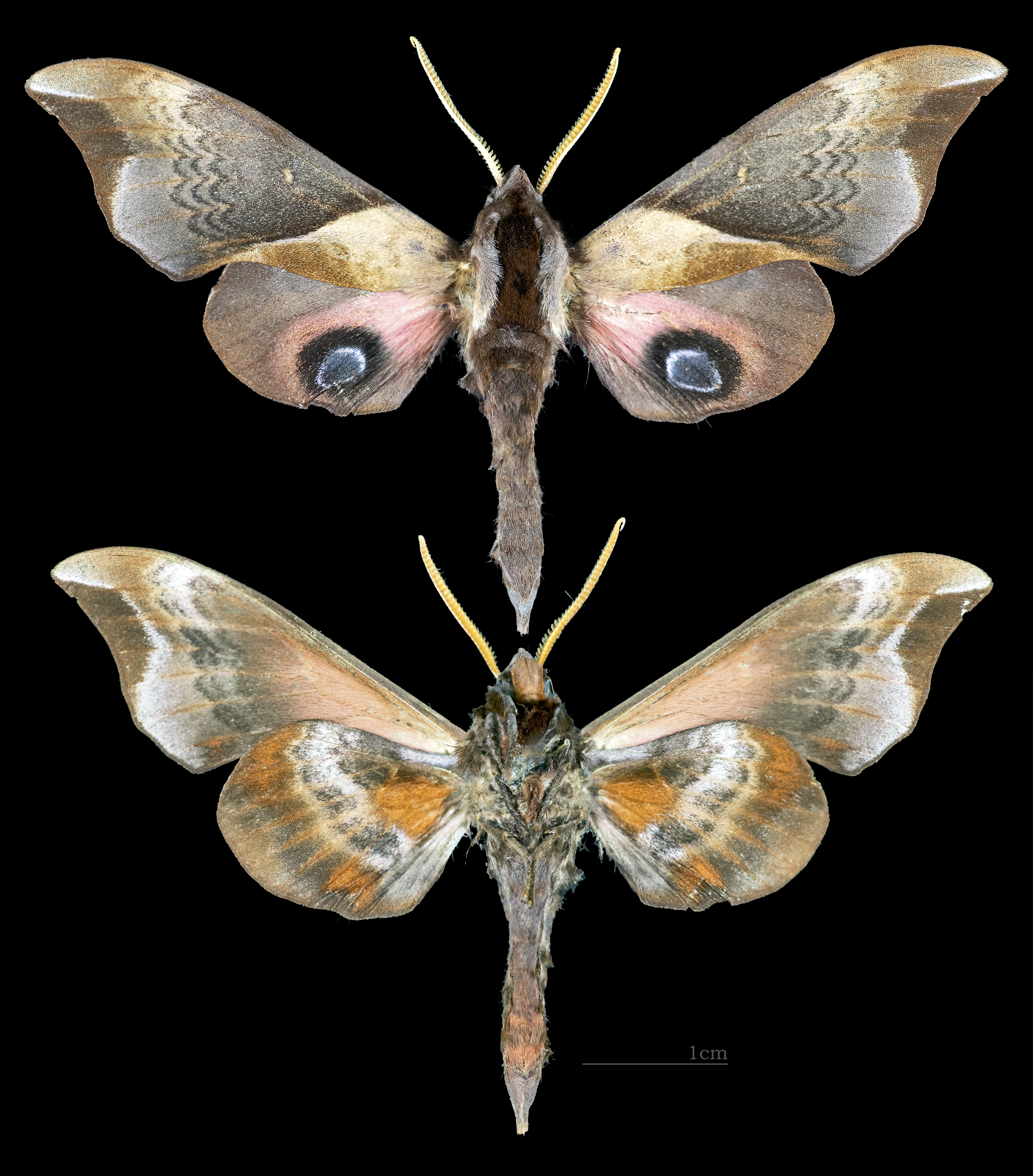
Smerinthus szechuanus

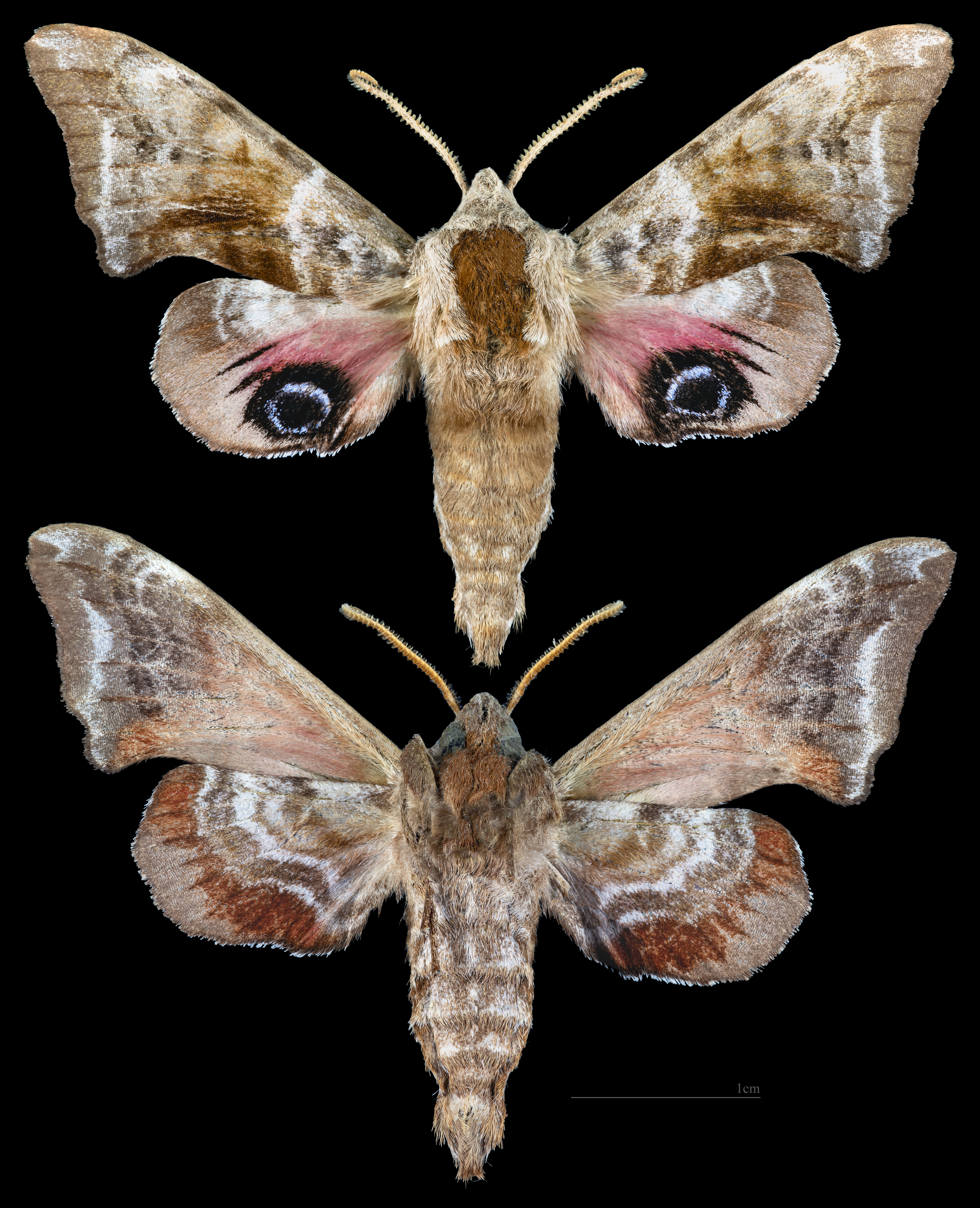
Smerinthus tokyonis

== Nomenclatural note ==
The name Smerinthus is apparently derived from the Greek feminine noun 'Merinthos', but has been Latinised with the masculine -us ending and is thus, according to the ICZN article 30.1.3, masculine. As the ICZN rules that species names that are adjectives should agree in gender with the genus name, the common use of Smerinthus ocellata for the widespread European species Smerinthus ocellatus is incorrect.
