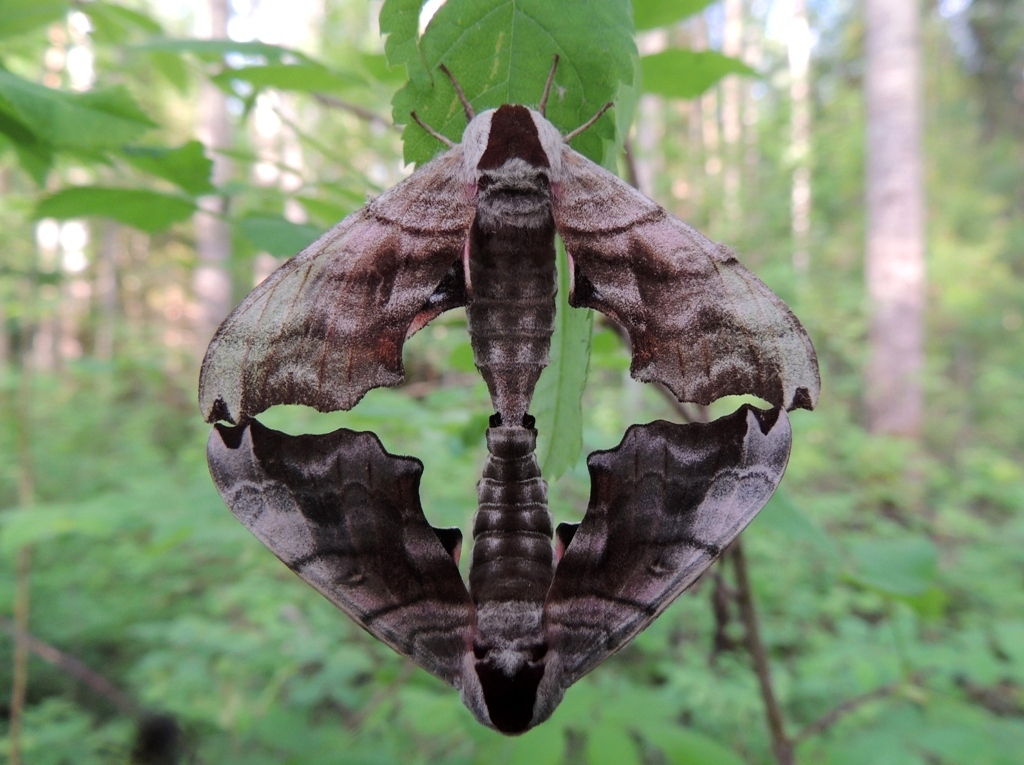
- Smerinthus caecus mating

Scientific classification
- Domain: Eukaryota
- Kingdom: Animalia
- Phylum: Arthropoda
- Class: Insecta
- Order: Lepidoptera
- Family: Sphingidae
- Genus: Smerinthus
- Species: S. caecus

Binomial name
- Smerinthus caecus Ménétriés, 1857

= Smerinthus caecus =

Northern eyed hawkmoth

Species of moth

Smerinthus caecus, the northern eyed hawkmoth, is a moth of the family Sphingidae. The species was first described by Édouard Ménétries in 1857.

== Description ==
The wingspan is 50–65 mm.

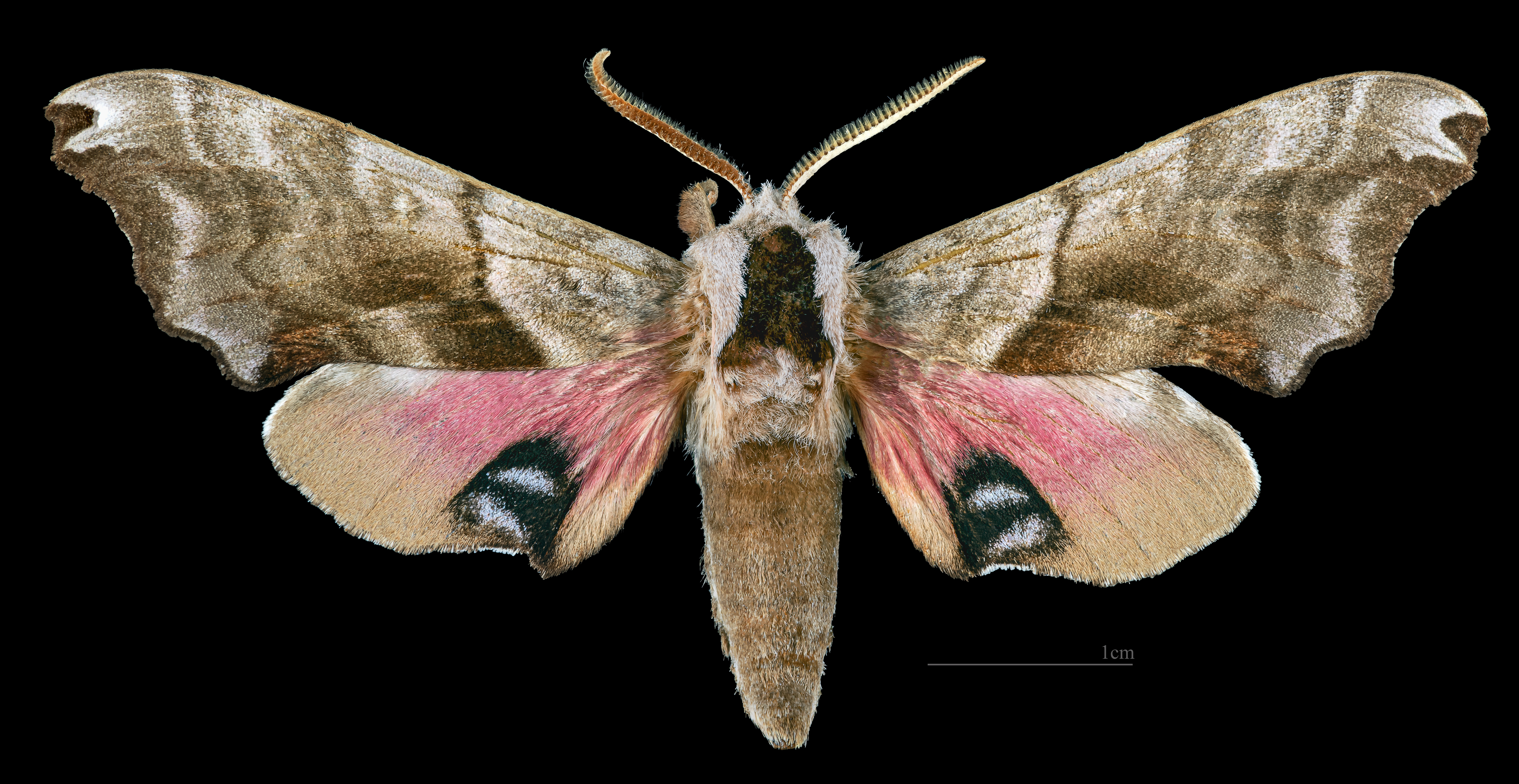
Male dorsal

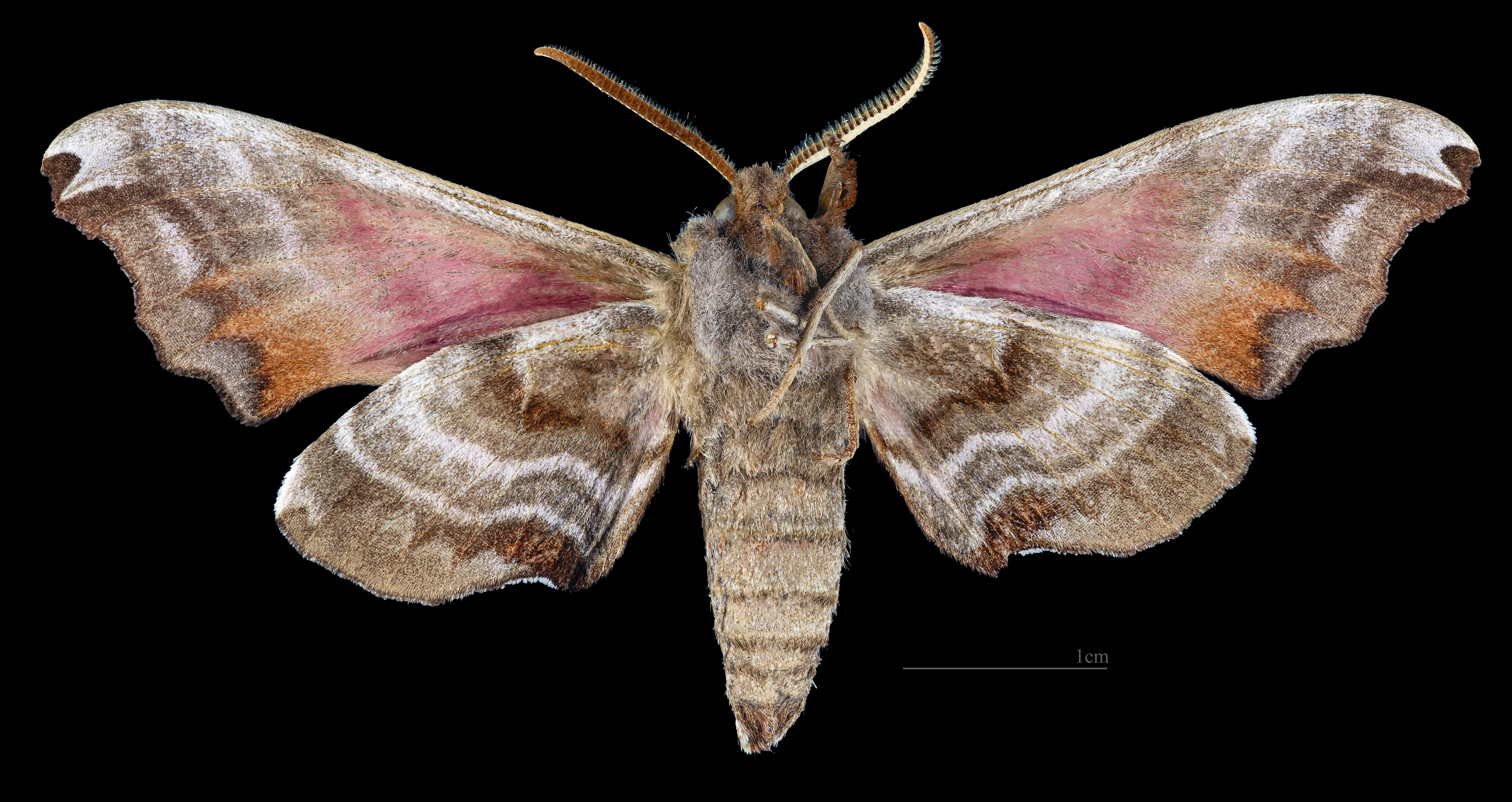
Male ventral

== Biology ==
Adults are on wing from end May/June to early July in one generation. There might be a partial second generation in August if the first adults emerge in May or early June.

The larvae feed on Salix and Populus species.
