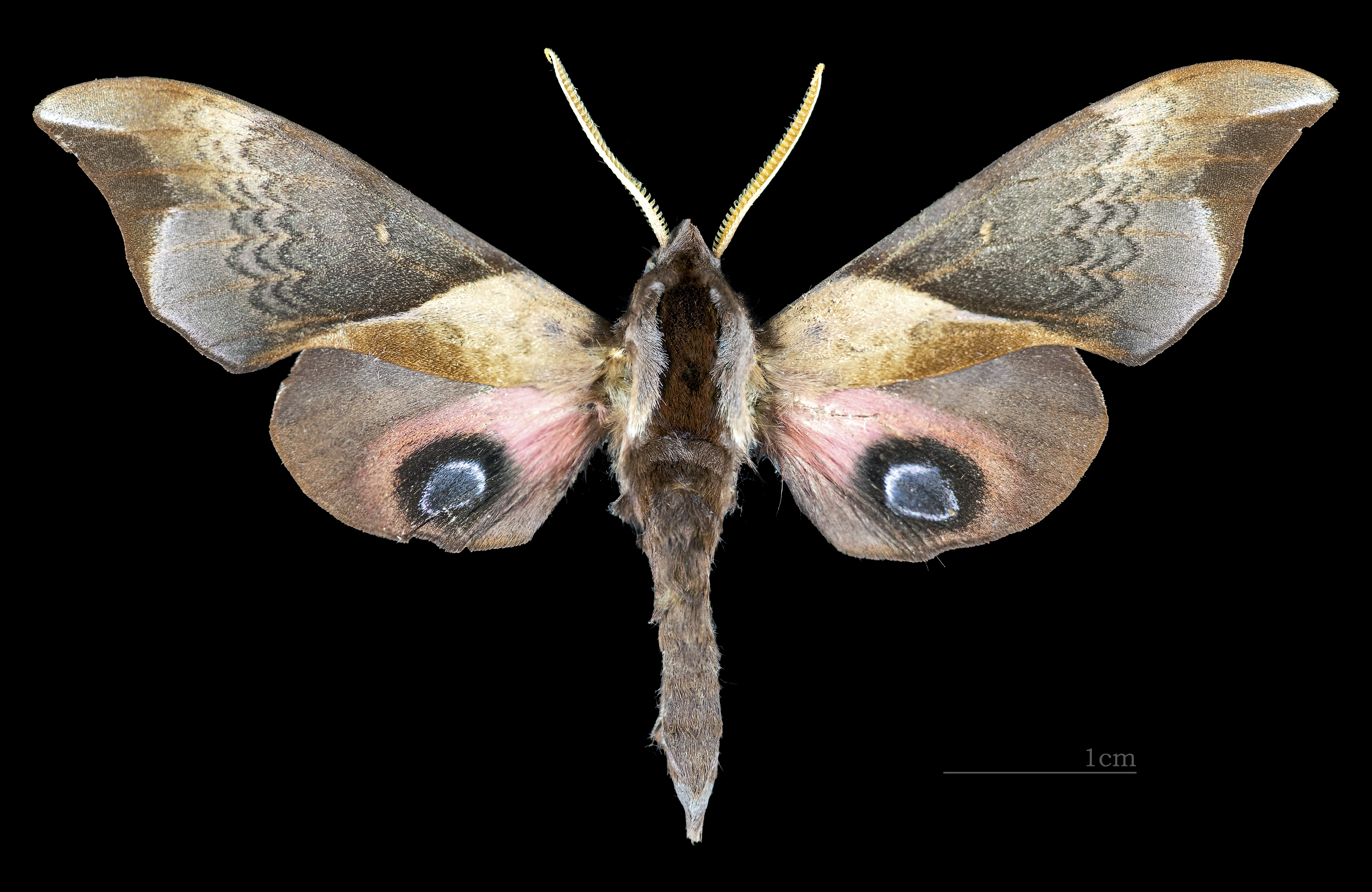
- Male dorsal
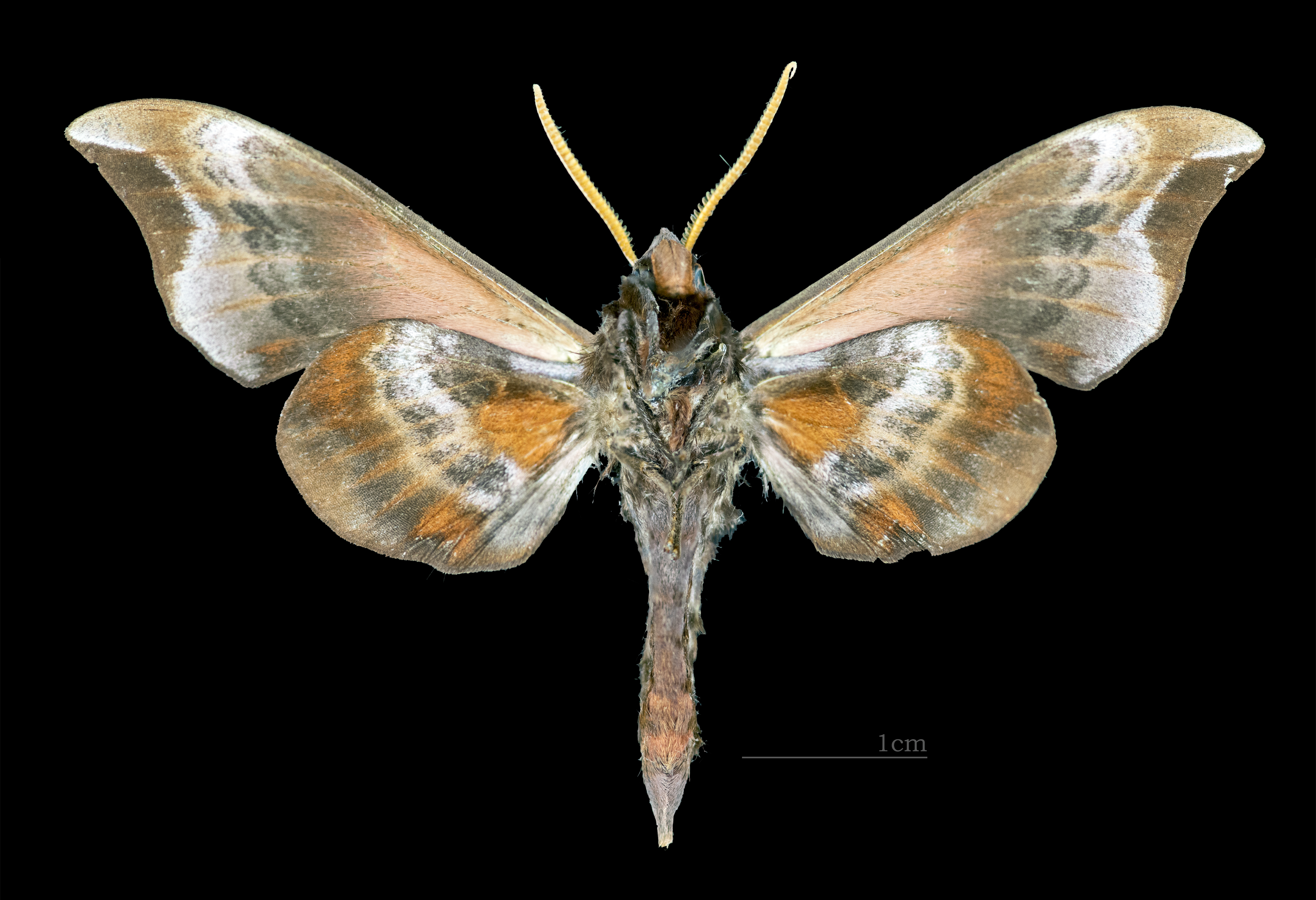
- Male ventral

Scientific classification
- Kingdom: Animalia
- Phylum: Arthropoda
- Class: Insecta
- Order: Lepidoptera
- Family: Sphingidae
- Genus: Smerinthus
- Species: S. szechuanus

Binomial name
- Smerinthus szechuanus (Clark, 1938)

Synonyms
- Anambulyx szechuanus Clark, 1938; Smerinthus litulinea Zhu & Wang, 1997

= Smerinthus szechuanus =

Species of moth

Smerinthus szechuanus, the Sichuan eyed hawkmoth, is a moth of the family Sphingidae. It was described by Benjamin Preston Clark in 1938. It is known from Hubei, Sichuan, Yunnan and Hunan in China.
