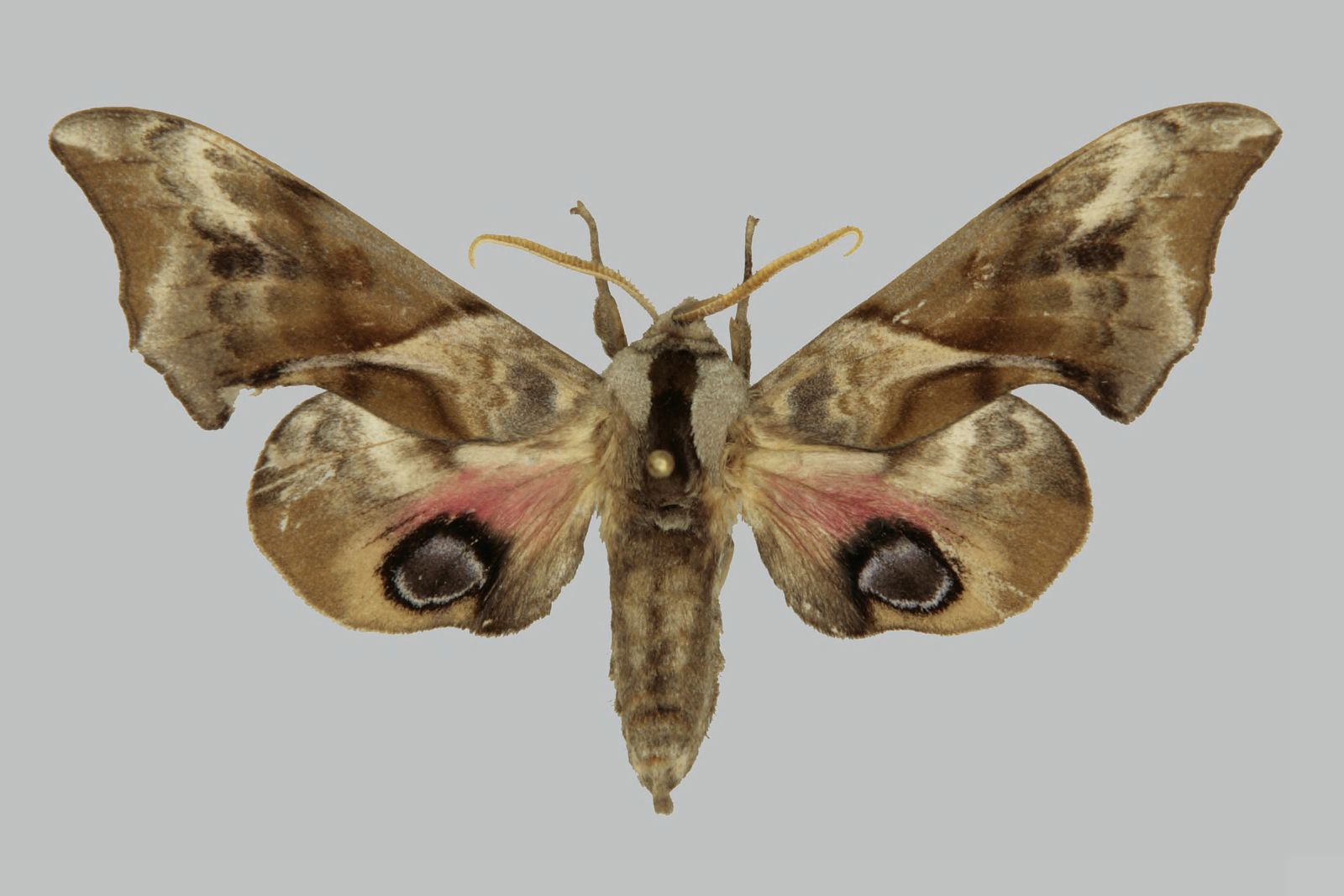

Scientific classification
- Domain: Eukaryota
- Kingdom: Animalia
- Phylum: Arthropoda
- Class: Insecta
- Order: Lepidoptera
- Family: Sphingidae
- Genus: Smerinthus
- Species: S. minor

Binomial name
- Smerinthus minor Mell, 1937

= Smerinthus minor =

Lesser eyed hawkmoth

Species of moth

Smerinthus minor, the lesser eyed hawkmoth, is a moth of the family Sphingidae. It was described by Rudolf Mell in 1937. It is a montane species found from the Taibai Shan area, western Qinling Mountains in Shaanxi, China eastwards along the Qinling to southern Shanxi and then north to just west of Beijing. It has also been recorded from the Miaofeng Mountains near Beijing and the Wuling Mountains in Hunan.

The wingspan is 70–80 mm. There is one generation per year with adults on wing from early June to early July.
