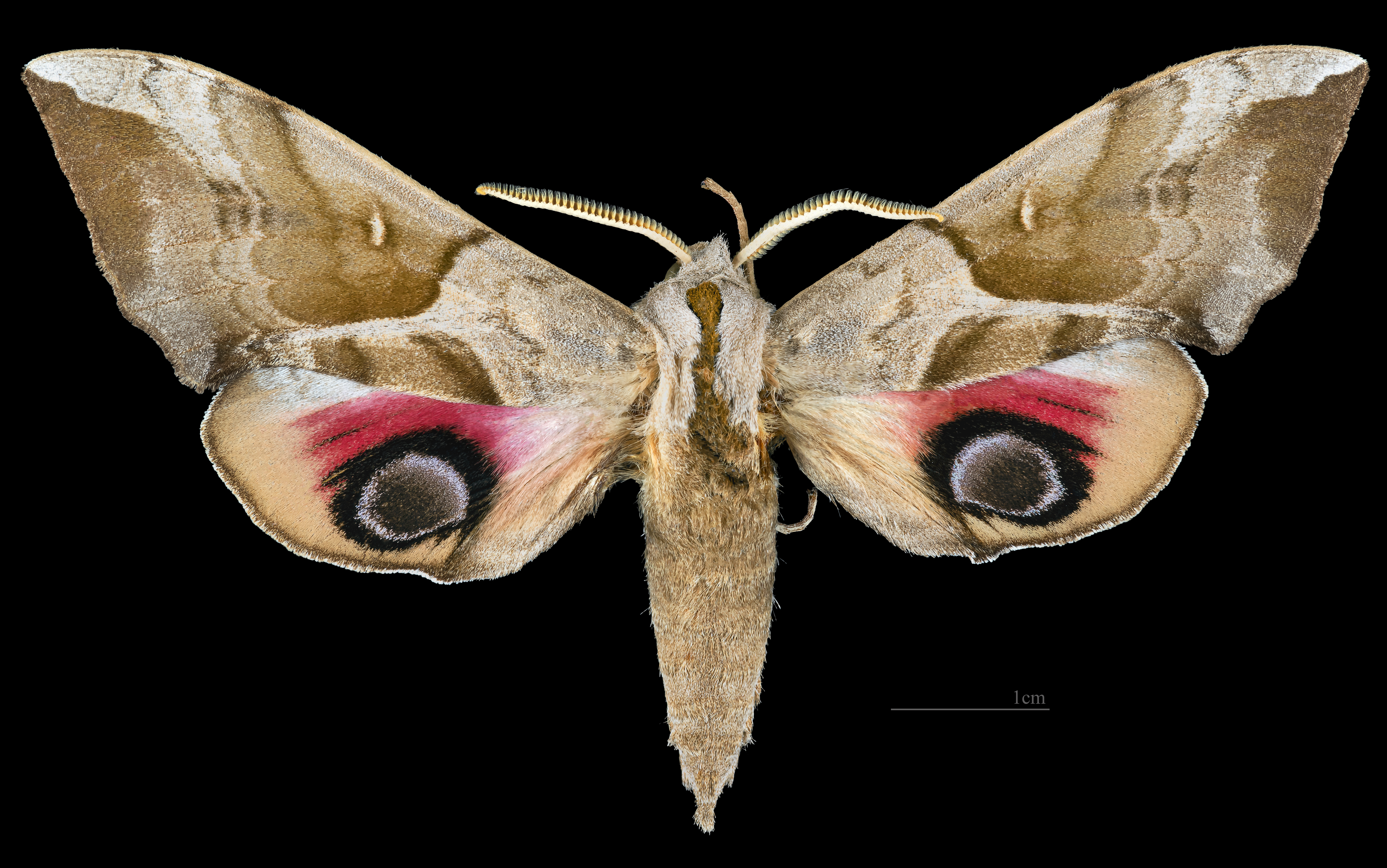
- Smerinthus planus male dorsal
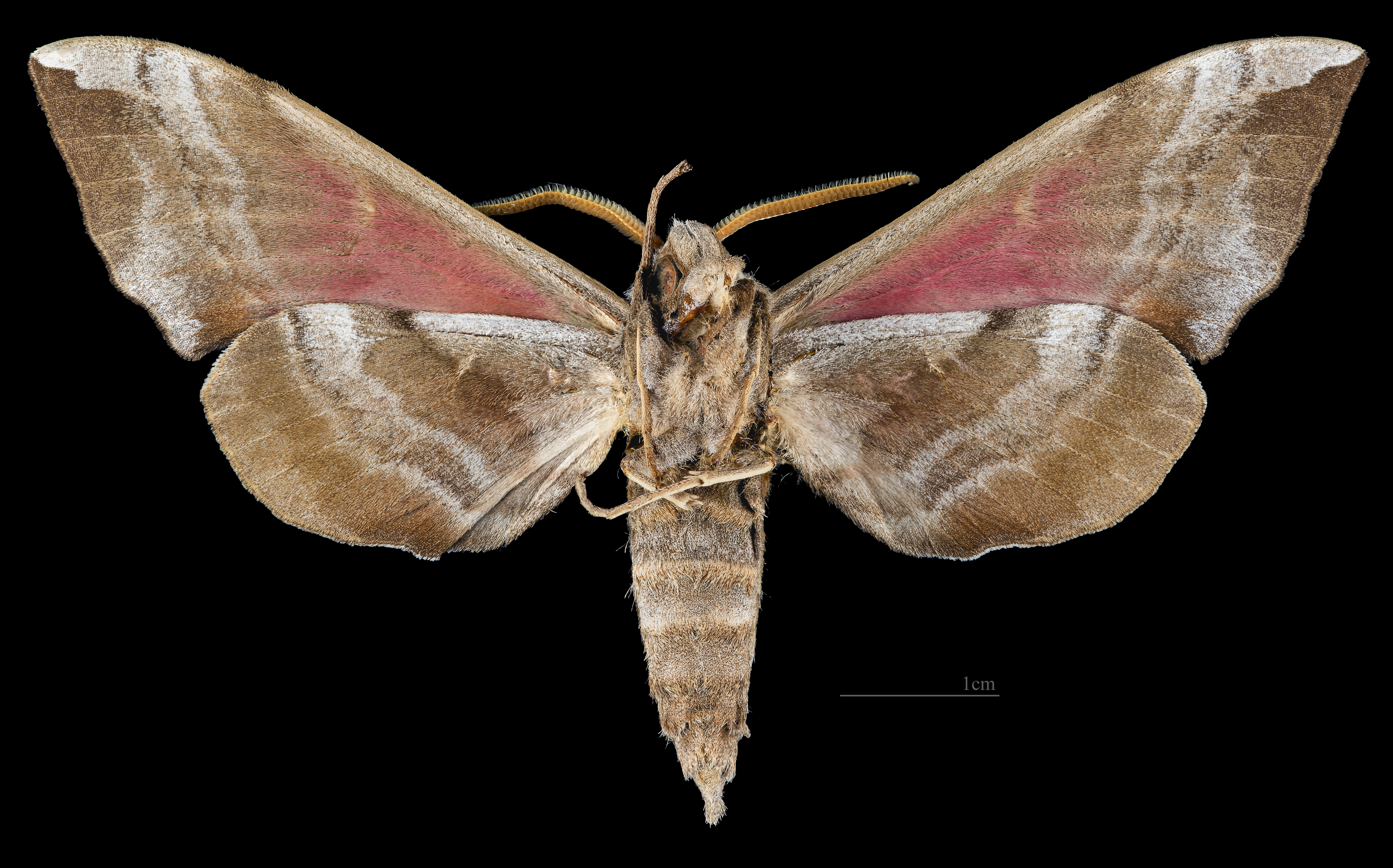
- Smerinthus planus male ventral

Scientific classification
- Kingdom: Animalia
- Phylum: Arthropoda
- Class: Insecta
- Order: Lepidoptera
- Family: Sphingidae
- Genus: Smerinthus
- Species: S. planus

Binomial name
- Smerinthus planus Walker, 1856

Synonyms
- Smerinthus argus Menetries, 1857; Smerinthus planus alticola Clark, 1922; Smerinthus planus chosensis (Matsumura, 1931); Smerinthus planus clarissimus (Mell, 1922); Smerinthus planus distinctus (Mell, 1922); Smerinthus planus juennanus Mell, 1922; Smerinthus planus kuangtungensis Mell, 1922; Smerinthus planus meridionalis Closs, 1917; Smerinthus planus unicolor (Matsumura, 1931)

= Smerinthus planus =

Oriental eyed hawkmoth

Species of moth

Smerinthus planus, the Oriental eyed hawkmoth, is a moth of the family Sphingidae. It was described by Francis Walker in 1856. It is found from northern Xinjiang across northern China, Mongolia and south-eastern Siberia to the Russian Far East and Japan, and then south through Korea and Taiwan to Hainan, Yunnan and eastern Tibet.

The wingspan is 70–100 mm. There are probably two generations per year in western China. Depending on latitude and weather, there are between one and four generations further east in China, with adults on wing between April and September.

The larvae feed on Populus and Salix species.
