= Alexandre Louis Lefèbvre de Cérisy =

French entomologist

Alexandre Louis Lefebvre de Cérisy (14 November 1798, Paris – 2 December 1867, le Bouchevilliers, near Gisors) was a French entomologist.

De Cérisy worked as clerk to a solicitor. It was Jean Baptiste Godart (1775-1825) who introduced him to entomology.

Of all insect orders, he was principally interested in Lepidoptera. Basing his studies on the use of the wing veins for the classification of Hymenoptera, he proposed in 1842, a similar system of classification (based on the veins of the wings) for butterflies. In 1829, he visited Egypt on a medical expedition. He traveled throughout Europe, sometimes accompanied by naturalists such as Achille Rémy Percheron (1797-1869) in Provence and Gabriel Bibron (1805-1848) in Sicily. He was at the founding meeting, February 29, 1832, of the Société entomologique de France.

Species of Lepidoptera named in honor of Cérisy are: Allancastria cerisyi (Godart, 1822) and Smerinthus cerisyi (Kirby, 1837).
