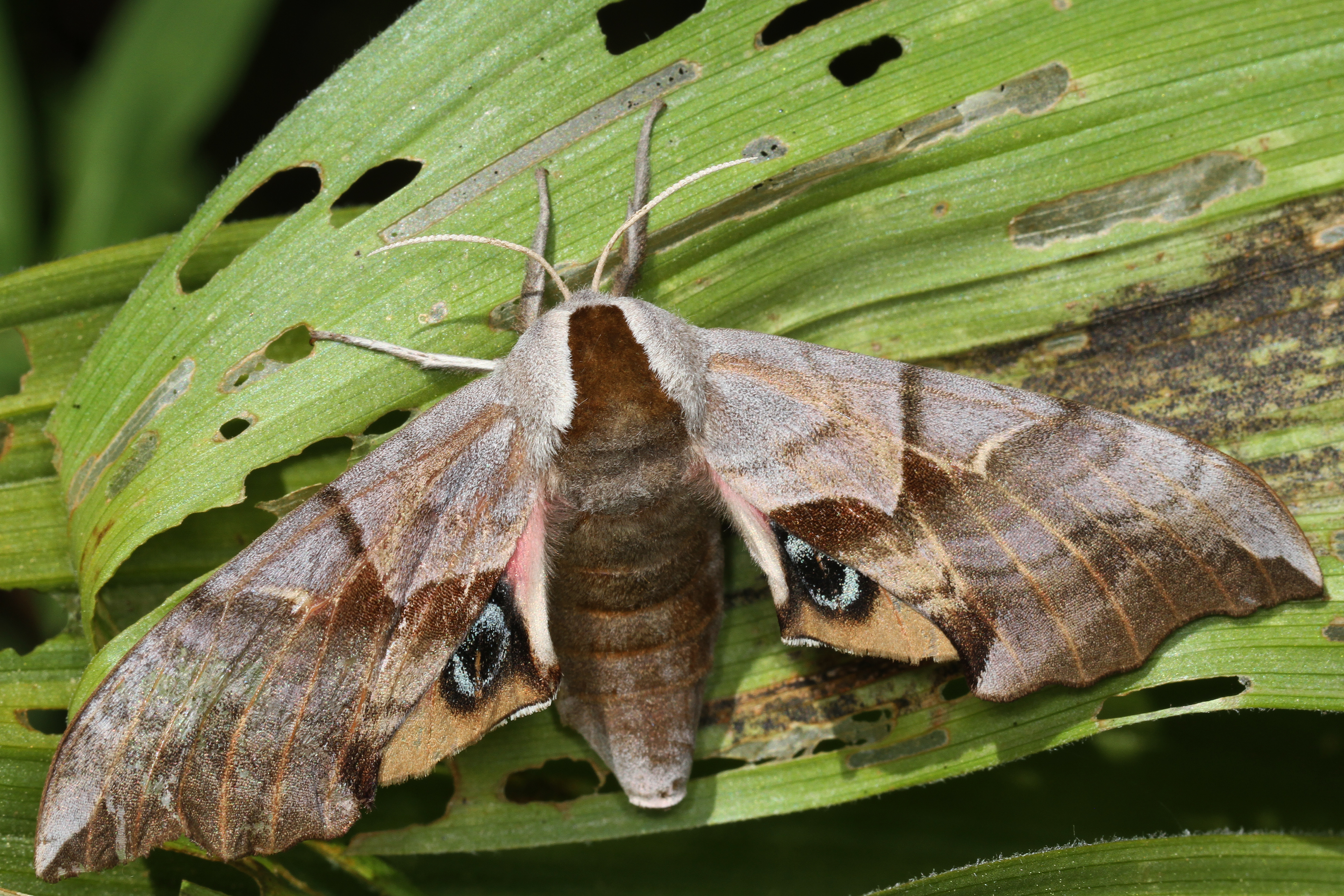

Scientific classification
- Domain: Eukaryota
- Kingdom: Animalia
- Phylum: Arthropoda
- Class: Insecta
- Order: Lepidoptera
- Family: Sphingidae
- Genus: Smerinthus
- Species: S. saliceti

Binomial name
- Smerinthus saliceti Boisduval, 1875

= Smerinthus saliceti =

Salicet sphinx

Species of moth

Smerinthus saliceti, the Salicet sphinx, is a moth of the family Sphingidae. The species was first described by Jean Baptiste Boisduval in 1875.

== Distribution ==
It is found in valleys and along streamsides from Mexico City north to western Texas,Arizona and extreme southern California.

== Gallery ==
The wingspan is 67–89 mm.

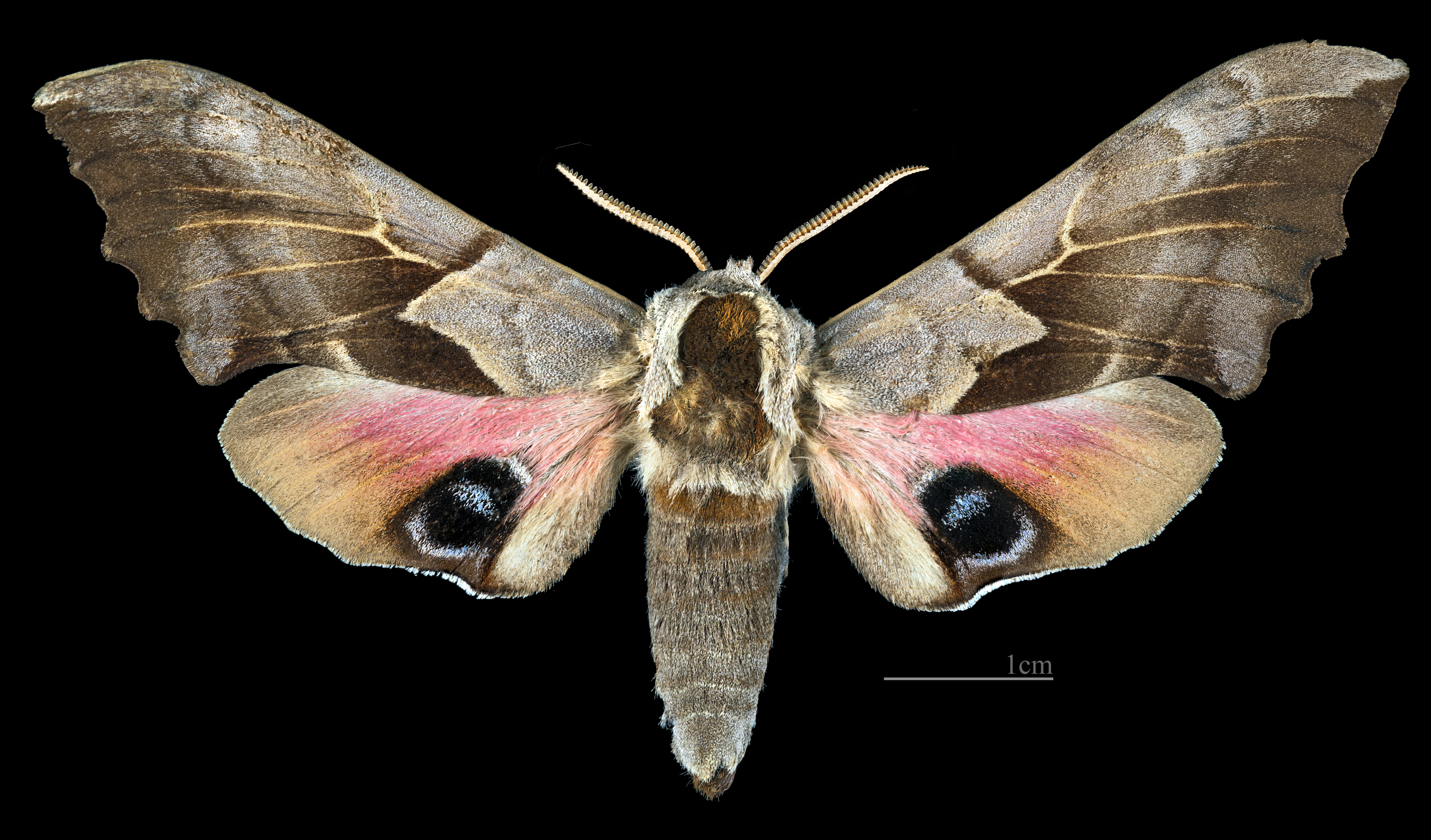
♂

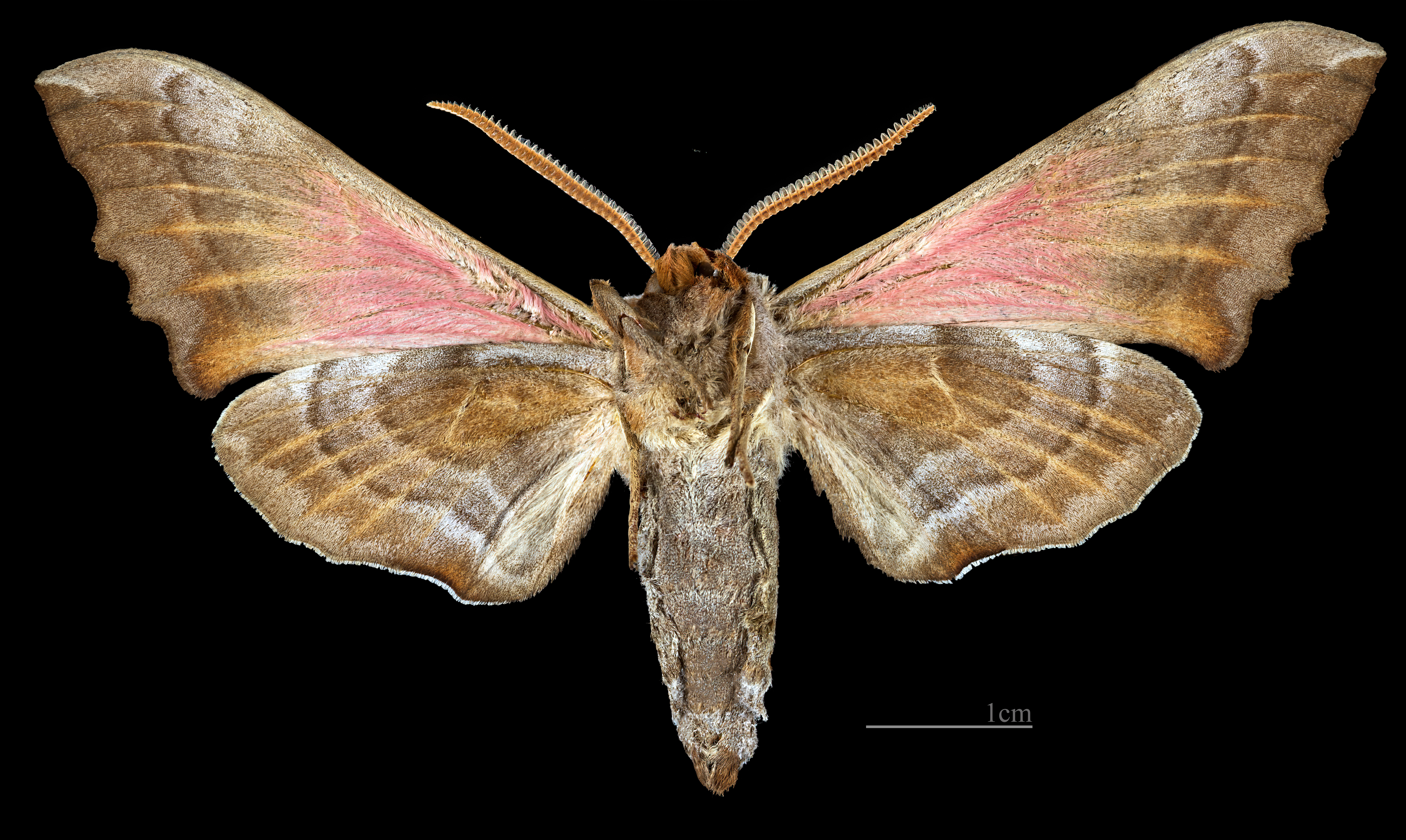
♂ △

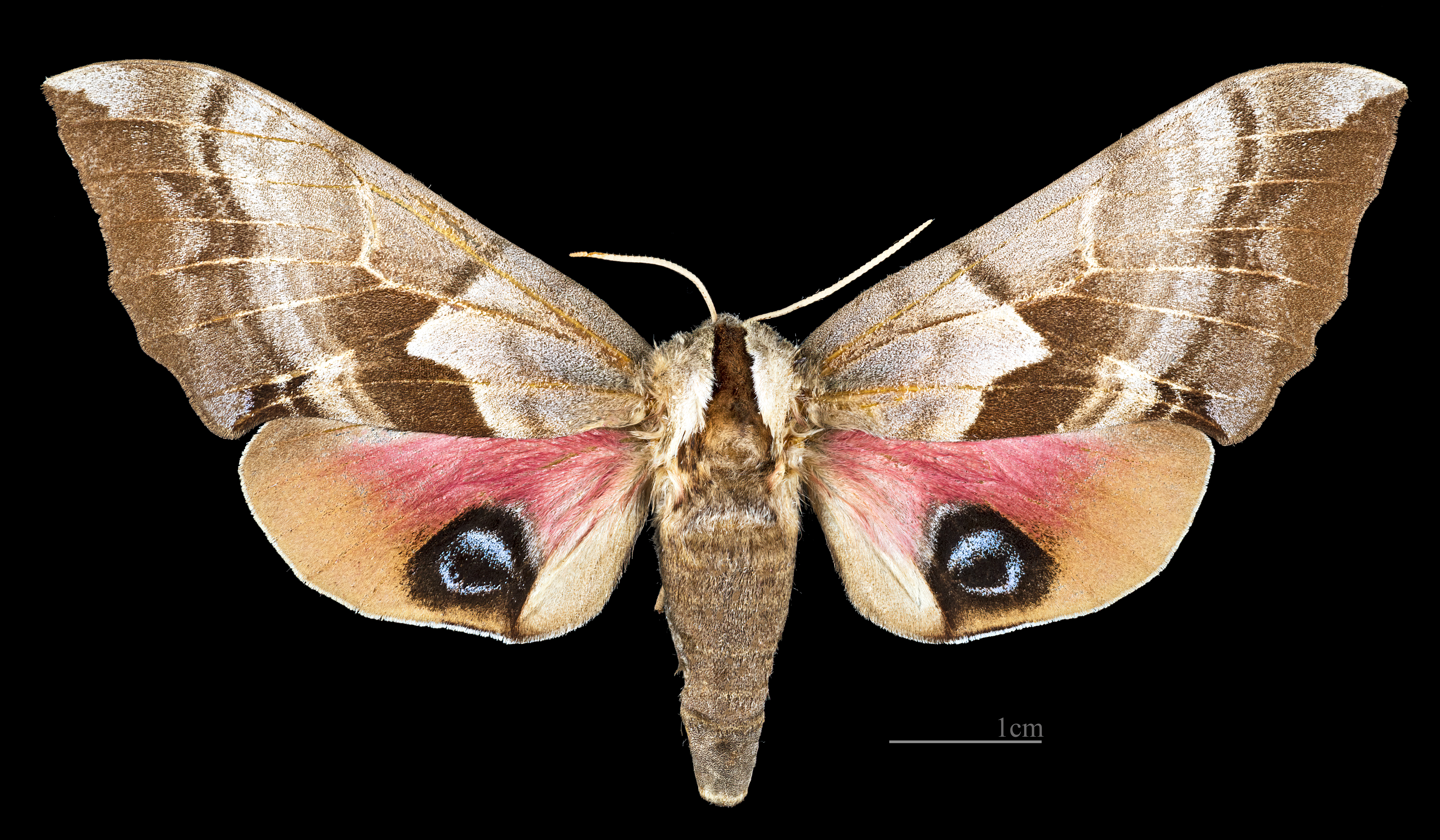
♀

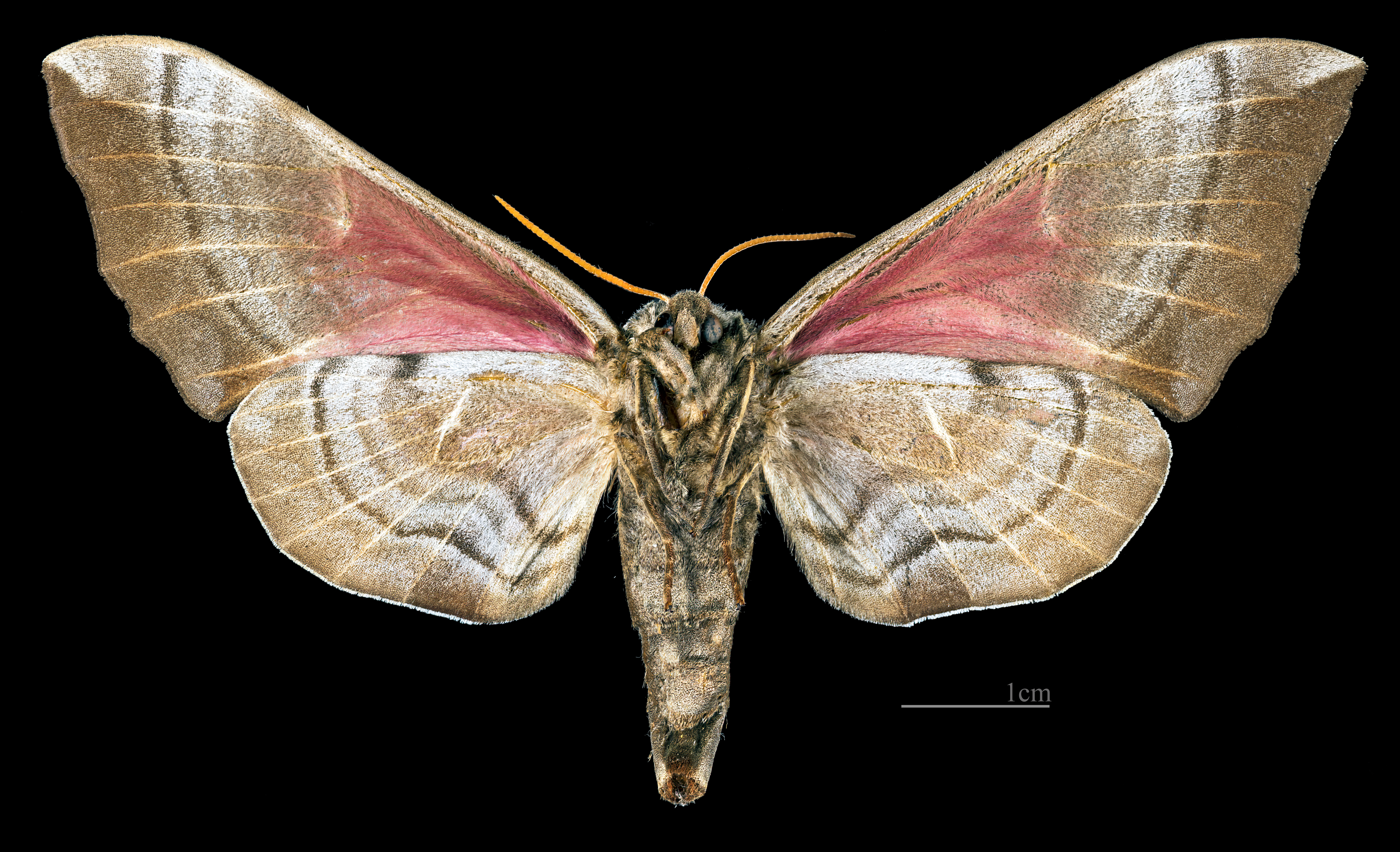
♀ △

== Biology ==
Adults are on wing from April to September, probably in two generations.
