= Kaliakra =

Cape in Bulgaria

- Southern Dobruja, Bulgaria
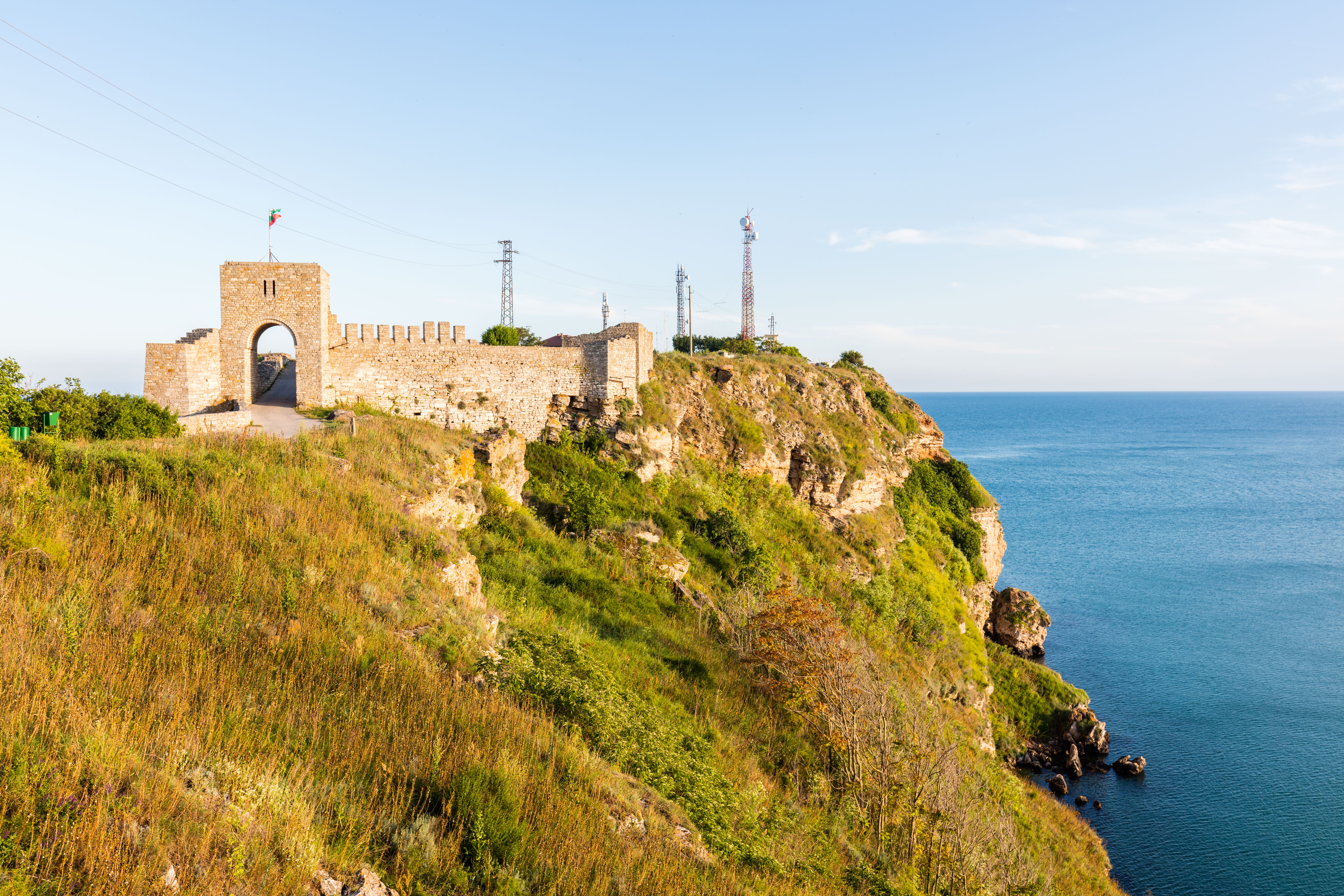
- The medieval fortress of Kaliakra

Site information
- Condition: ruin

Location
- Location within Bulgaria
- Coordinates: 43°22′N 28°28′E

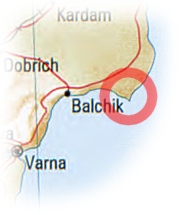
Location of Kaliakra

Kaliakra (Bulgarian: Калиакра) is a cape in the Southern Dobruja region of the northern Bulgarian Black Sea Coast, which ends with a long and narrow headland 12 kilometres (7 mi) east of Kavarna, 60 kilometres (37 mi) northeast of Varna and 65 kilometres (40 mi) southwest of Mangalia. The coast is steep with vertical cliffs reaching 70 metres (230 ft) down to the sea. Kaliakra is a nature reserve, where dolphins and cormorants can be observed. It sits on the Via Pontica, a major bird migration route from Africa into Eastern and Northern Europe. Many rare and migrant birds can be seen here in spring and autumn and, like much of this coastline, is home to several rare breeding birds (e.g. pied wheatear and a local race of European shag). The rest of the reserve also has unusual breeding birds; saker falcon, lesser grey shrike and a host of others.

It also features the remnants of the fortified walls, water-main, baths and residence of Despot Dobrotitsa in the short-lived Despotate of Dobruja's medieval capital. The Bolata Cove with a small sheltered beach lies just north at the mouth of a picturesque canyon, also part of the nature reserve.

== Name ==
The following names have been used for the headland and the fortress throughout their history:

- Thracian: Tirizis (Greek: Τίριζις)
- Latin: T(i)rissa
- Greek: Ἂκραι or Καλή Άκρα, Akrai or Kalē Akra
- Bulgarian: Нос Калиакра
- Italian: Capo Caliacra
- Turkish: Kaligra Burnu
- Romanian: Caliacra

The name "Kaliakra" is of Byzantine Greek origin. It is a combination of "καλός" ("beautiful") and "άκρα" ("headland" or "edge" or "extremity") and is traditionally translated as "Beautiful Headland".

== History ==
Kaliakra was the site of the naval Battle of Cape Kaliakra on 11 August 1791, part of the Russo-Turkish War (1787–1792).

The first modern lighthouse on Kaliakra was built in 1866 by the Compagnie des Phares de l’Empire Ottoman; the present one, a 10-metre (33 ft) cylindrical stone masonry tower with lantern and gallery, was erected in 1901, with focal plane height of 68 metres (223 ft) and a white flash (every 5 seconds); it also has a radio navigation emitter and a foghorn.

Near Kaliakra, there is a large mediumwave broadcasting facility, which never went into service as planned. As of 2009, several wind power facilities are under development in the vicinity. The area now has three championship golf courses designed by the legendary golfers Gary Player and Ian Woosnam.

== Ancient fortress ==
=== History ===
The earliest naval settlement dates back to the 4th century BC, when the area was inhabited by the Thracian tribe of Tiris and who gave the area its original name of Tirisis.

The ancient geographer Strabo, describing Kaliakra, stated that the capital of King Lisimachus, one of Alexander's generals and ruler of Thrace, was located here. According to rumor, he hid in the caves near the peninsula his innumerable treasure, reputedly captured on the campaigns against Persia. In the Hellenistic era, a second fortress wall was built inland, and in Roman times the Thracian fortress was expanded. In the years 341–342, round towers were completed, and there was already a city built up around the fortress. In the second half of the 4th century, a third fortification with 10 m walls, 2.90 m thick, was erected even farther from the end of the peninsula. During the archeological excavations made in the 20th century, the remains of ancient and early Christian necropolises were discovered on Kaliakra.

In the 5-6th century, according to Hierocele, the fortress (now known as Accra Castellium or simply Accra-cape) gained the importance of a fortified nucleus against the oncoming barbarian tribes and was one of the 15 cities in the province of Scythia. In 513, a battle ensued between Kaliakra and the Byzantine emperor Anastasius I. The settlement and fortress developed in the following centuries, but according to some researchers in the 7th century a decline occurred because the Slavs and Proto-Bulgarians showed no interest in settling this place. In 10th century sources, the area is variously listed as Tetrasida, Tetrasiada, Tetrisias, Trisa, Tirisa, or Tirista.

The earliest dated Western European map that mentions the modern name Kaliakra is that of the Italian Petrus Vesconta, from 1318. In other Italian maps and 14th-century writings, the peninsula is also described as Capo Calacria or Calacria. The German armored bearer Hans Schiltberger describes the peninsula as Kalacerca, derived from the "καλός" – beautiful / good and "τσέρκι" – a hoop, given the three walls of the Kaliakra fortress. The Bulgarian Navy of the First World War included a mine-clearing boat named "Kalatserka".

The heyday of Kaliakra was in the second half of the 14th century when it was the capital of the principality (despotate) of Carvun under the Bulgarian rulers Balik and Dobrotitsa. The despotate covered the northeastern Bulgarian lands, and was detached from the central government. Dobrotica is also called Dobrudzha, which is the Turkish pronunciation of its name. Written records speak of a powerful, medieval town where the ruler cut his own coins and turned the fortress into a church center. Today there are remains of the fortress walls on the tip of the headlands; some of the water supply, baths and the residence of the prince are still preserved. Kaliakra's despots were the first of the native rulers to begin building a navy. Dobrotica's galleys participated in successful combat operations in the Black Sea. In 1393 - 1394 the Carvun principality became one of the last Bulgarian possessions to fall under Ottoman rule.

In 1402, the Vlach voivode Mircea Stari took over the lands around Kaliakra, but later that year the area was again occupied by the Ottoman troops. In 1444, the knights of the Polish and Hungarian King Vladislav III Varnenczyk were stopped near Cape Kaliakra in their campaign against the Ottoman Empire. In the old Turkish lawmen, Kaliakra is mentioned as a port with a Kilagra or Celigra Burun customs.

On July 31, 1791, the largest naval battle in the Black Sea began off the coast of Kaliakra during the Russo-Turkish War of 1787–1792. The Russian squadron, led by Admiral Fyodor Ushakov, repeatedly defeated Hussein Pasha's superior Turkish armada, and helped end the war. A plaque with a bas-relief of the Russian Admiral was erected on the headland's tip. On August 10, 2006, the 215th anniversary of this victory, a monument to him was erected. The monument is a figure in full height and is located on a hill, where it is visible from the sea.

== Legends ==
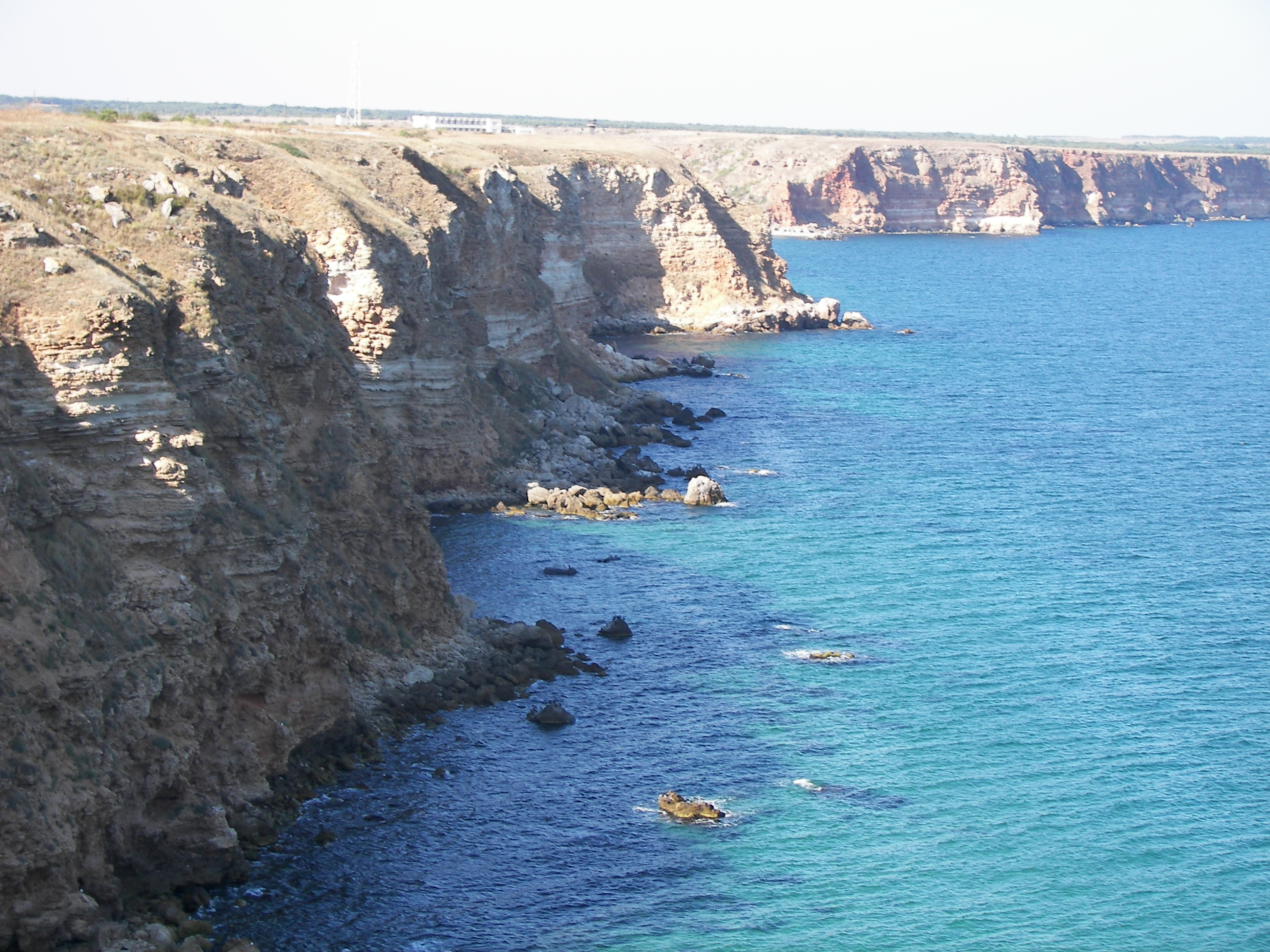
Rock beach

Probably the most popular legend about the place is one about 40 Bulgarian girls, who preferred to tie their hair together and jump into the Black Sea rather than face the prospect of being captured by the Ottomans. An obelisk dedicated to this legend is placed at the entrance to the cape, called The Gate of the 40 Maidens.

Another legend tells the story of Saint Nicholas, the patron of seamen, who was running away from the Ottomans when God made the earth under him longer and longer so he could escape, and the cape was formed this way. The saint was eventually captured and a chapel was built in 1993, symbolizing his grave. A dervish monastery is also said to have existed on the same place during Ottoman rule, which is thought to have preserved the relics of Muslim Bektashi saint Sarı Saltık.

A third legend is about Lysimachus, a successor of Alexander the Great, who seized the royal treasure and escaped to Kaliakra, dying in a major storm along with his whole fleet.

== Climate ==
Climate data for Kaliakra (2000-2013)
Month	Jan	Feb	Mar	Apr	May	Jun	Jul	Aug	Sep	Oct	Nov	Dec	Year
Mean daily maximum °C (°F)	5.2 (41.4)	5.6 (42.1)	8.9 (48.0)	13.2 (55.8)	20.5 (68.9)	24.6 (76.3)	27.5 (81.5)	27.8 (82.0)	23.2 (73.8)	17.8 (64.0)	12.7 (54.9)	7.7 (45.9)	16.2 (61.2)
Daily mean °C (°F)	2.7 (36.9)	3.1 (37.6)	6.3 (43.3)	10.6 (51.1)	17.3 (63.1)	21.6 (70.9)	24.3 (75.7)	24.6 (76.3)	20.3 (68.5)	15.1 (59.2)	10.3 (50.5)	5.2 (41.4)	13.5 (56.3)
Mean daily minimum °C (°F)	0.2 (32.4)	0.5 (32.9)	3.6 (38.5)	8.0 (46.4)	14.1 (57.4)	18.6 (65.5)	21.0 (69.8)	21.5 (70.7)	17.5 (63.5)	12.5 (54.5)	7.9 (46.2)	2.7 (36.9)	10.7 (51.3)
Mean monthly sunshine hours	90	100	159	211	302	331	354	322	215	151	100	78	2,413
Source: Stringmeteo.com

Kaliakra (2002-2012)

Climate chart (precipitation, max. and min. temperature)
J	F	M	A	M	J	J	A	S	O	N	D
34 5 0	30 6 1	25 9 4	22 13 8	24 21 14	36 25 19	34 28 21	20 28 22	61 23 18	57 18 13	29 13 8	52 8 3
- █ Average max. and min. temperatures in °C
- █ Precipitation totals in mm
Imperial conversion
J	F	M	A	M	J	J	A	S	O	N	D
1.3 41 32	1.2 43 34	1 48 39	0.9 55 46	0.9 70 57	1.4 77 66	1.3 82 70	0.8 82 72	2.4 73 64	2.2 64 55	1.1 55 46	2 46 37
- █ Average max. and min. temperatures in °F
- █ Precipitation totals in inches

== Honour ==
Kaliakra Glacier on Livingston Island in the South Shetland Islands, Antarctica is named after Kaliakra.

== Gallery ==
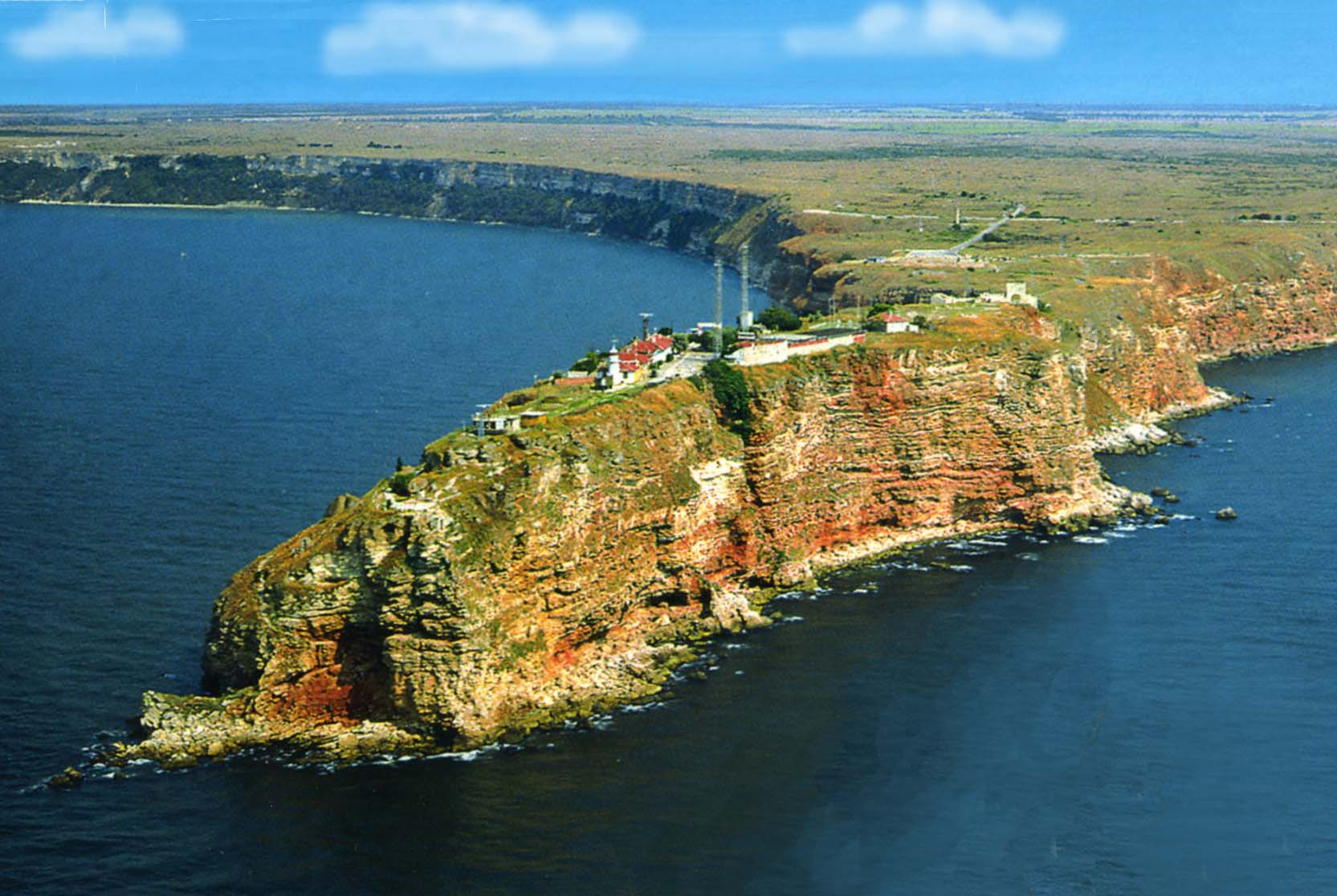

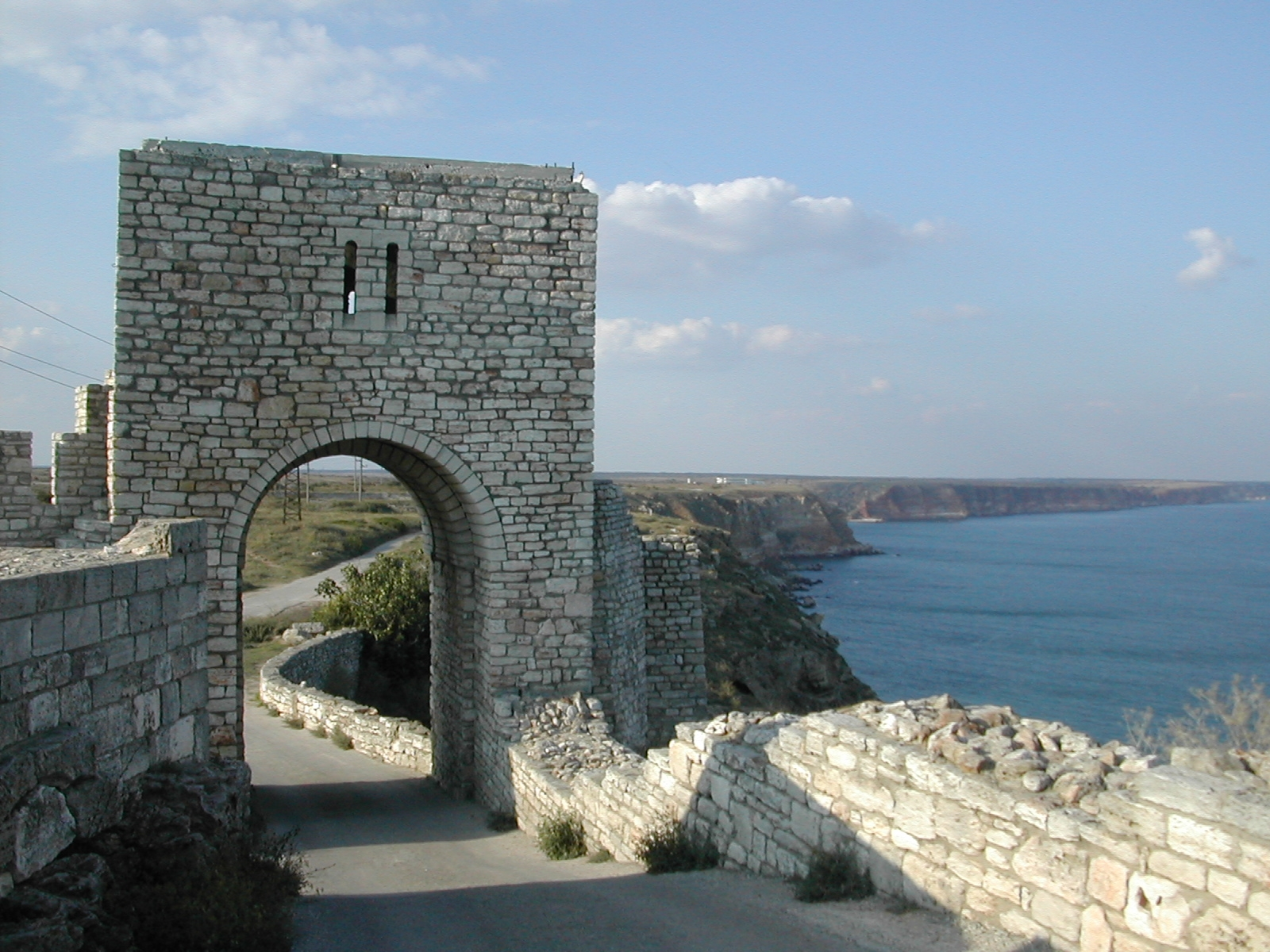

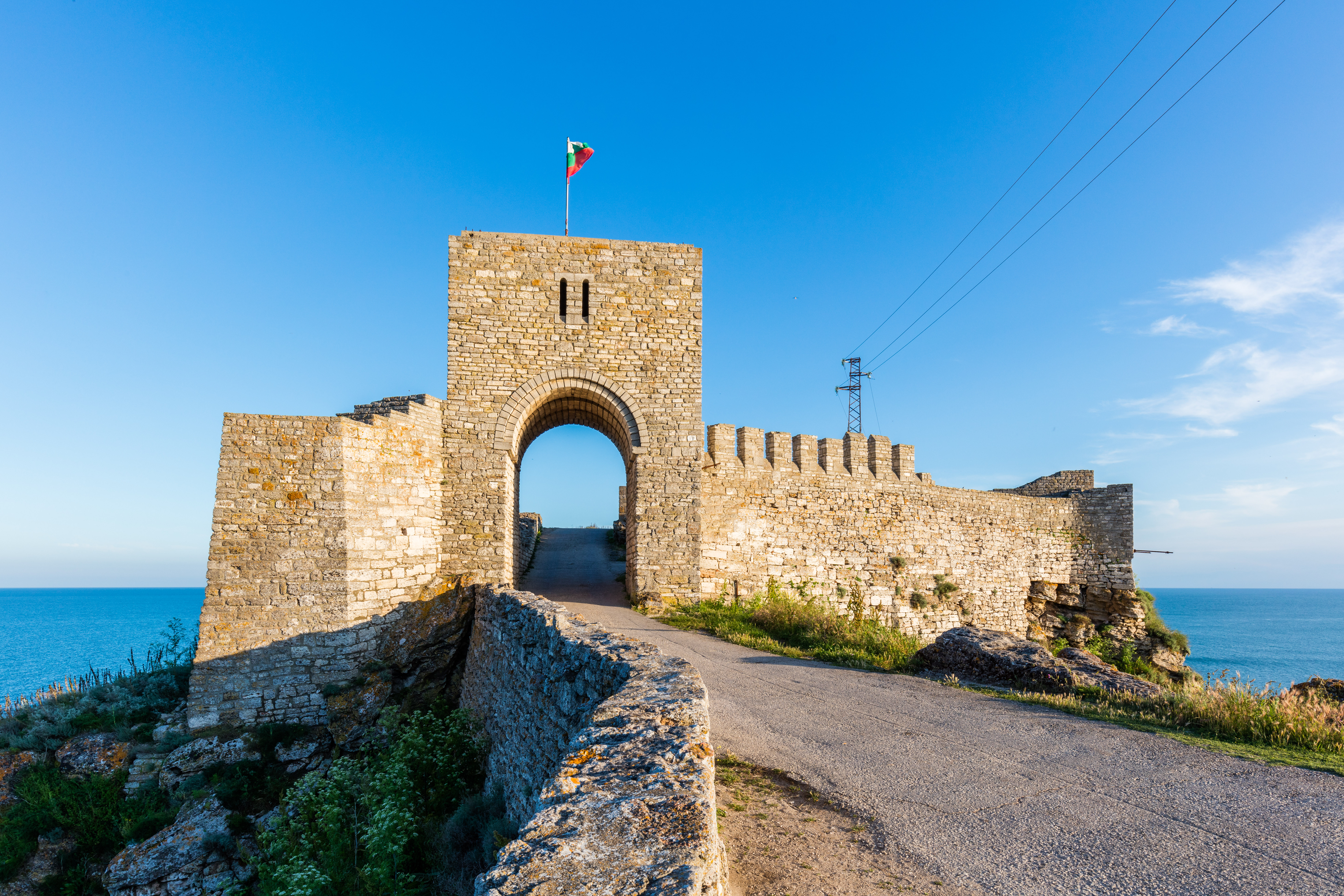

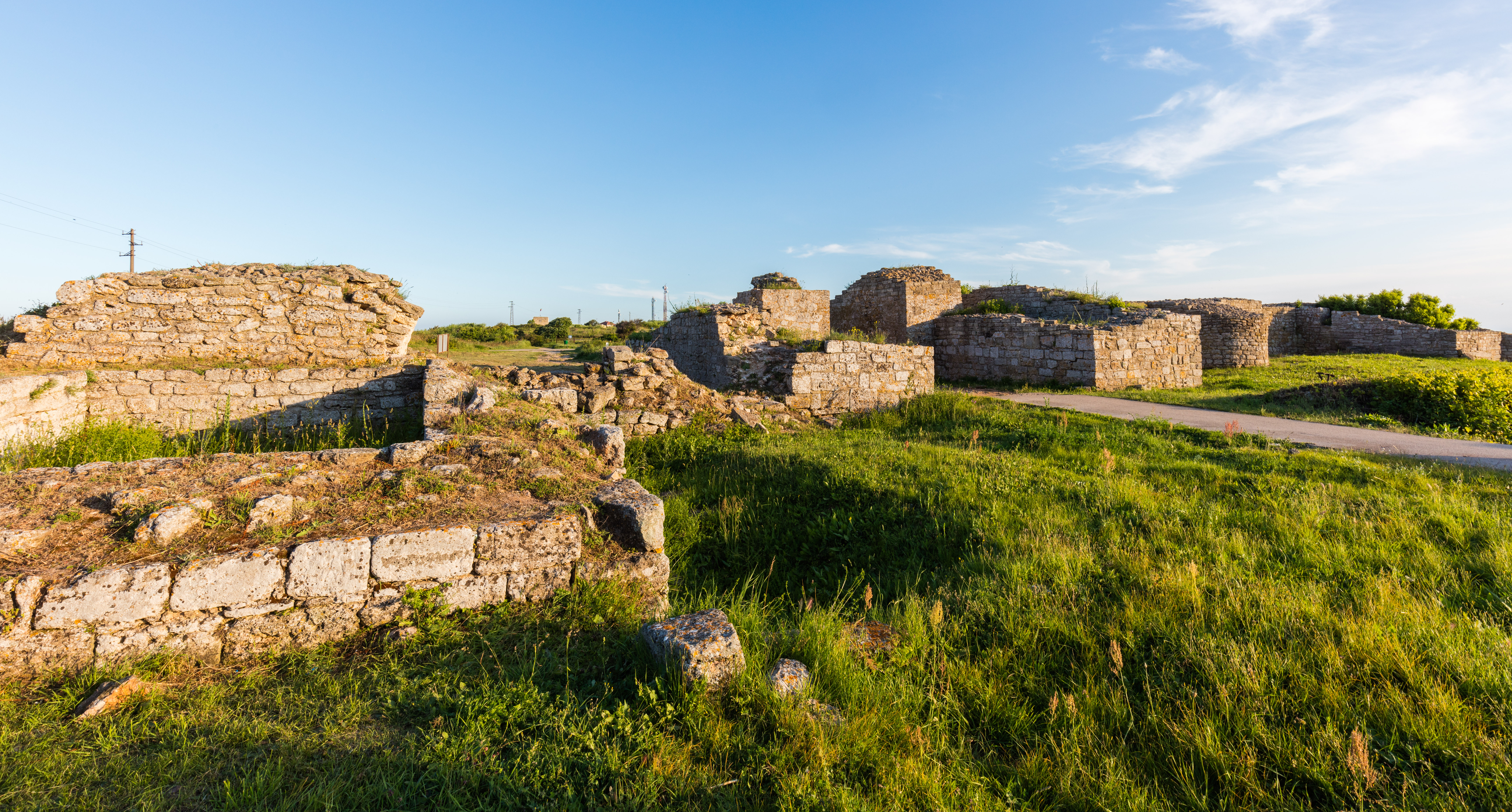

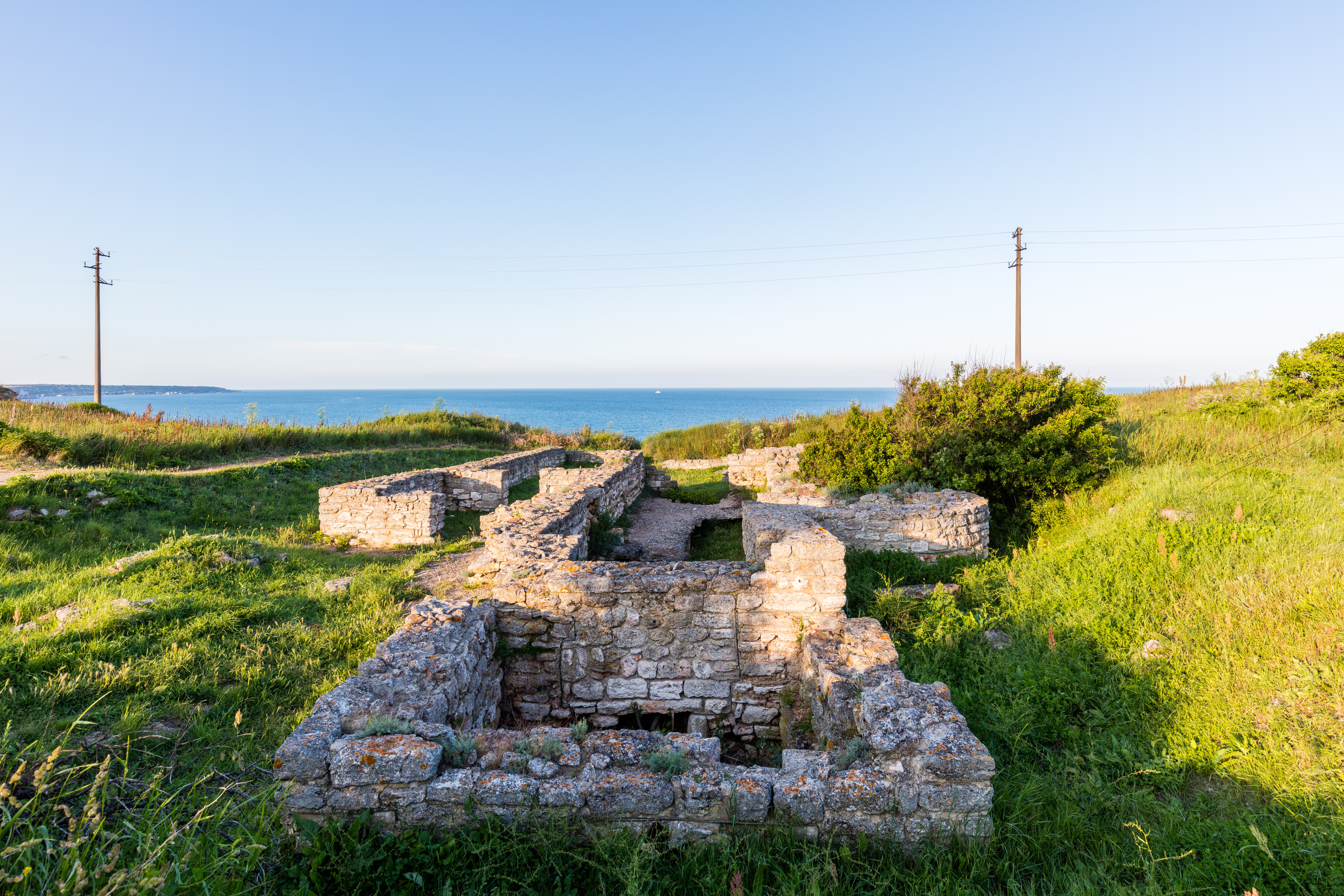

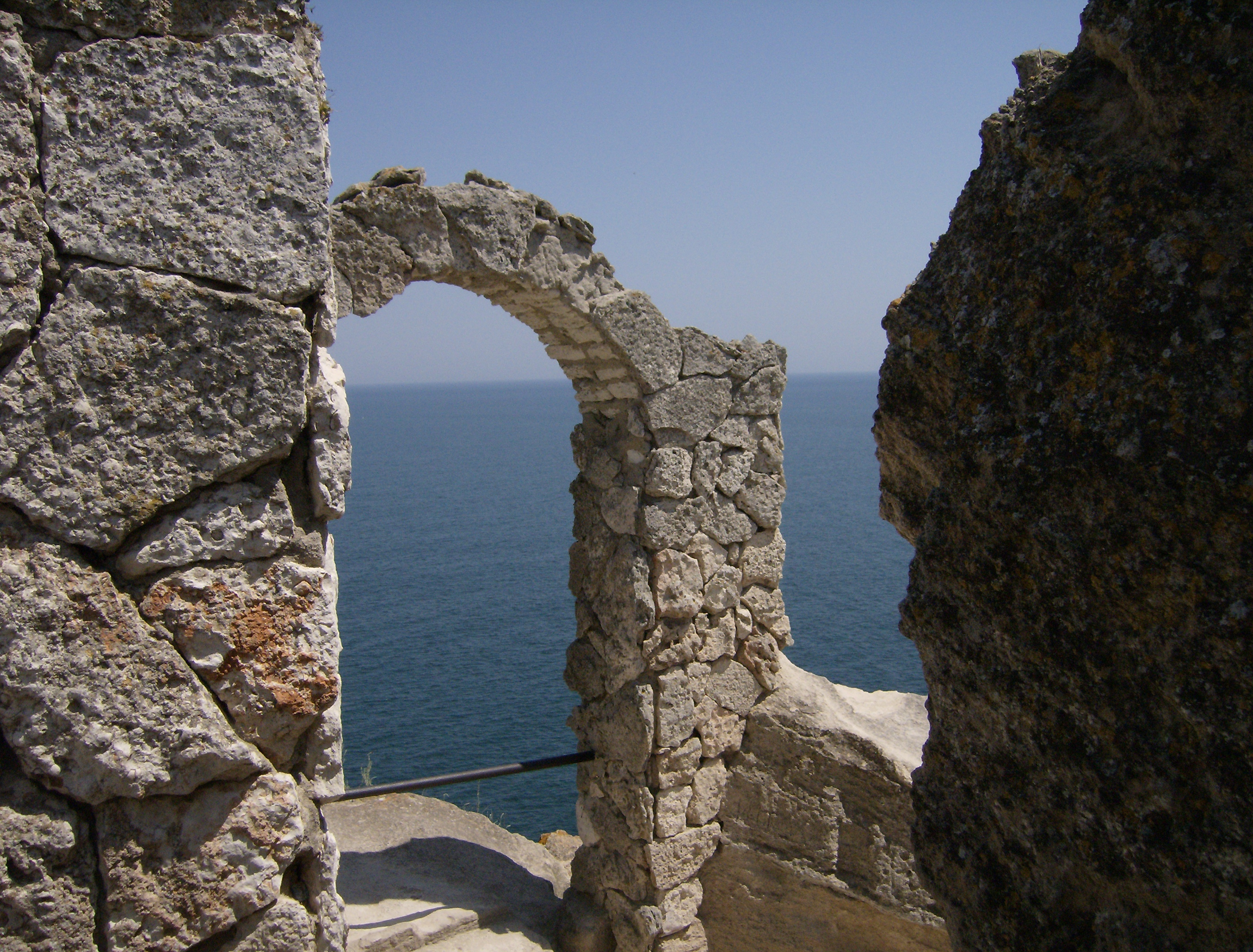

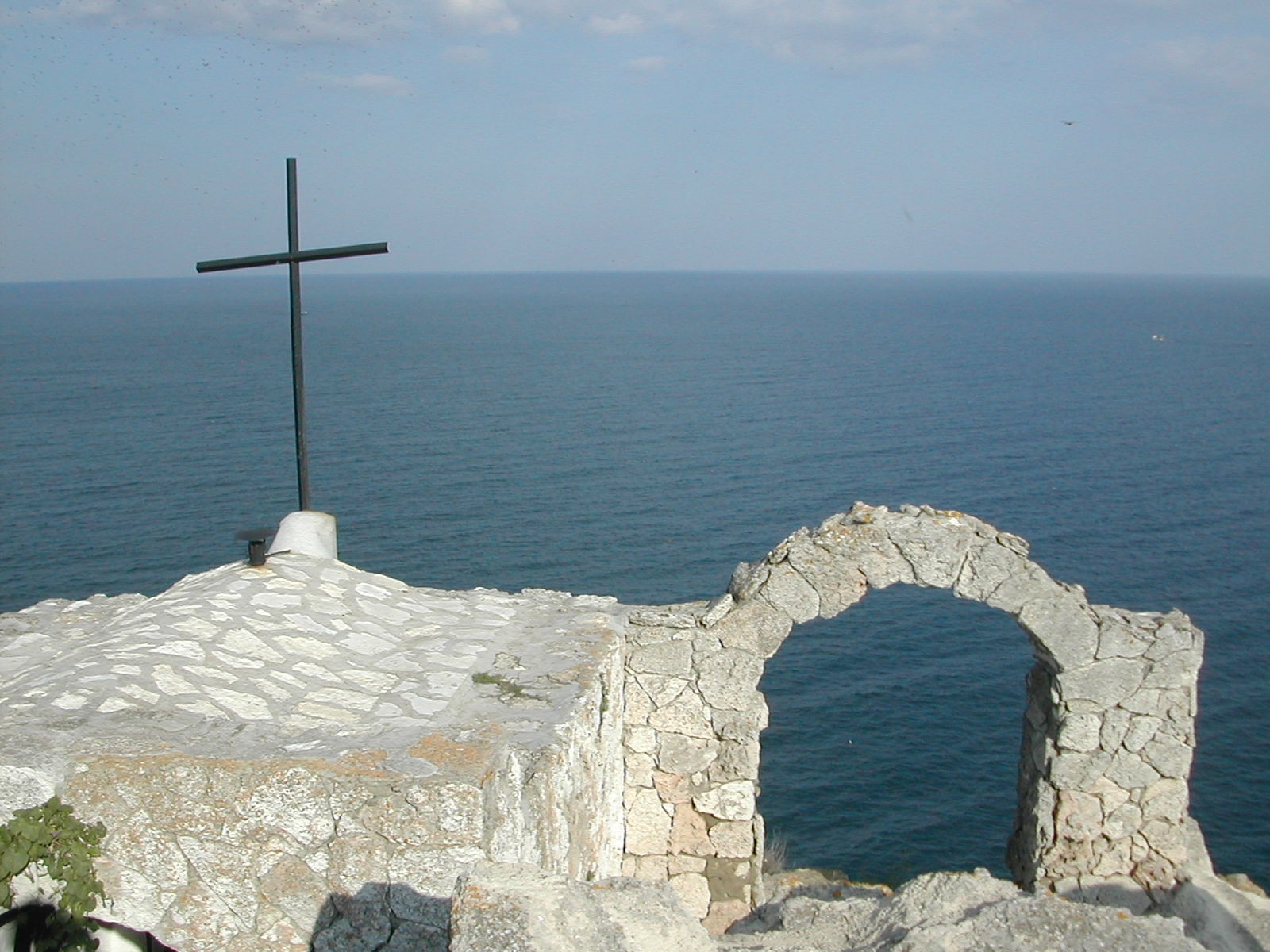

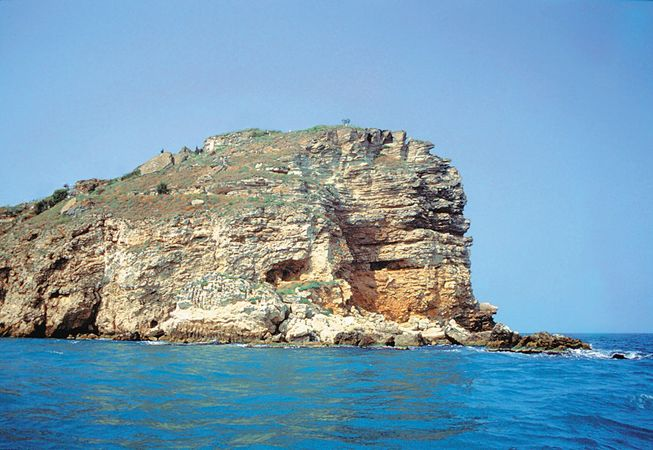

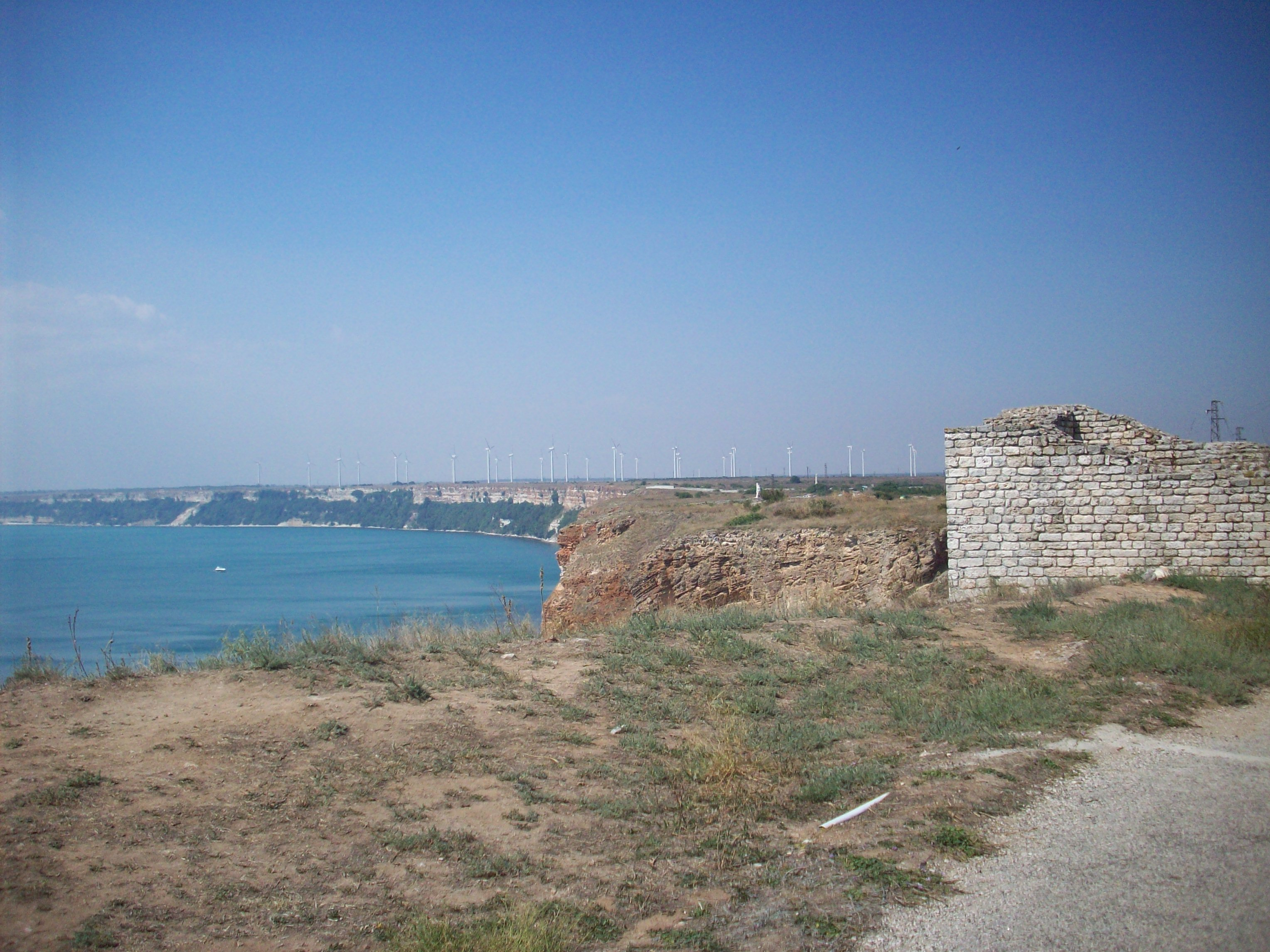

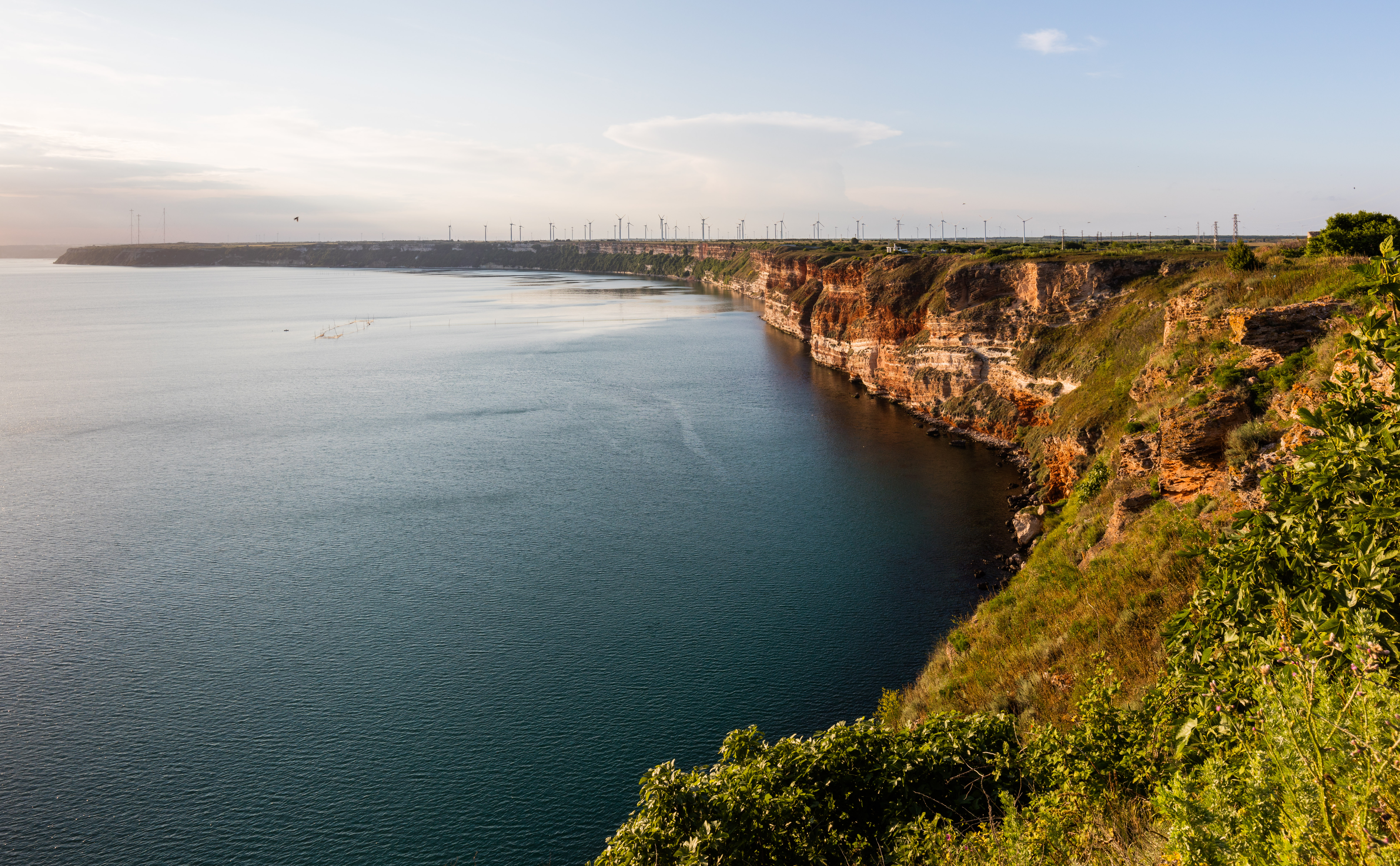

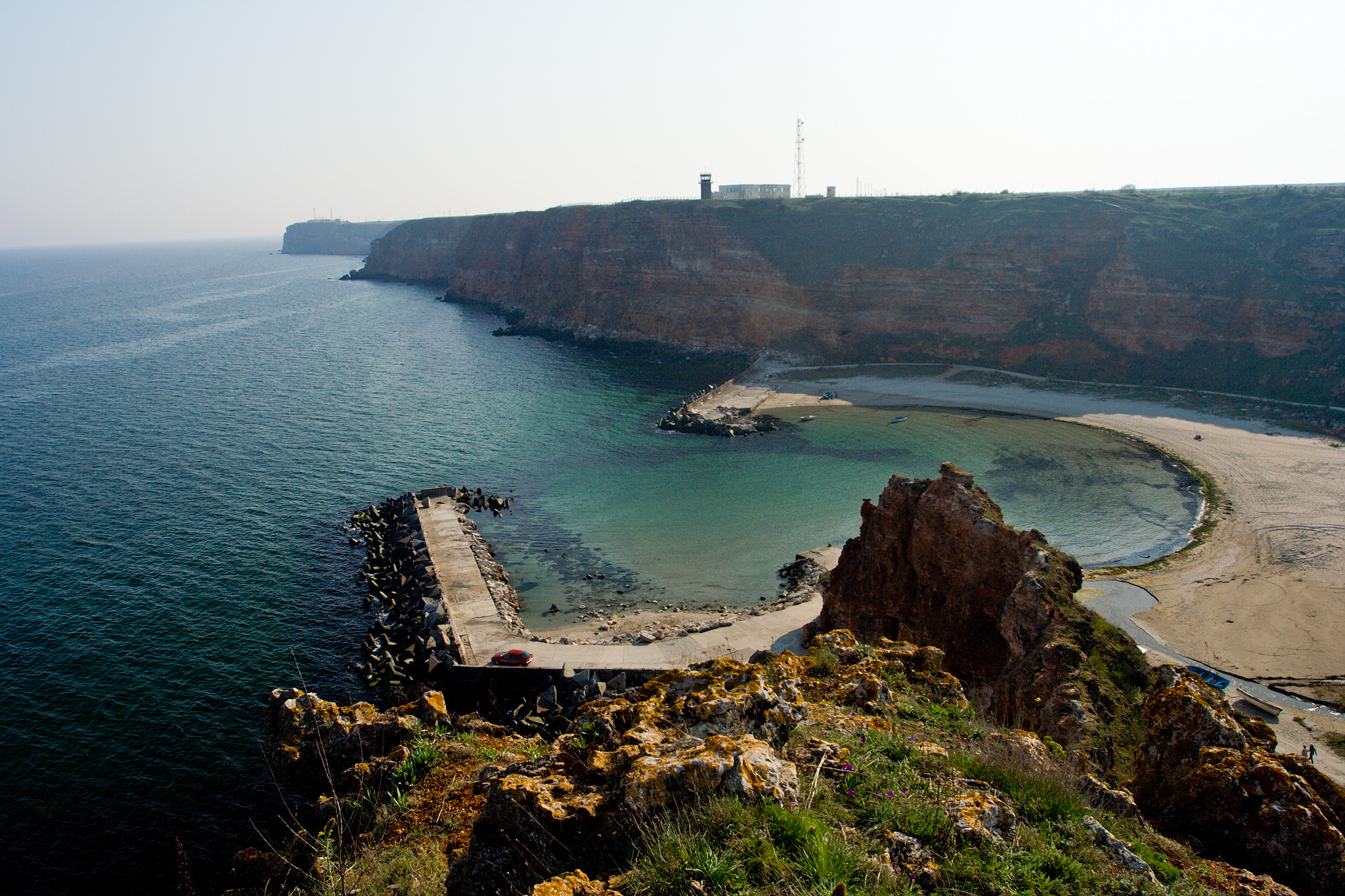

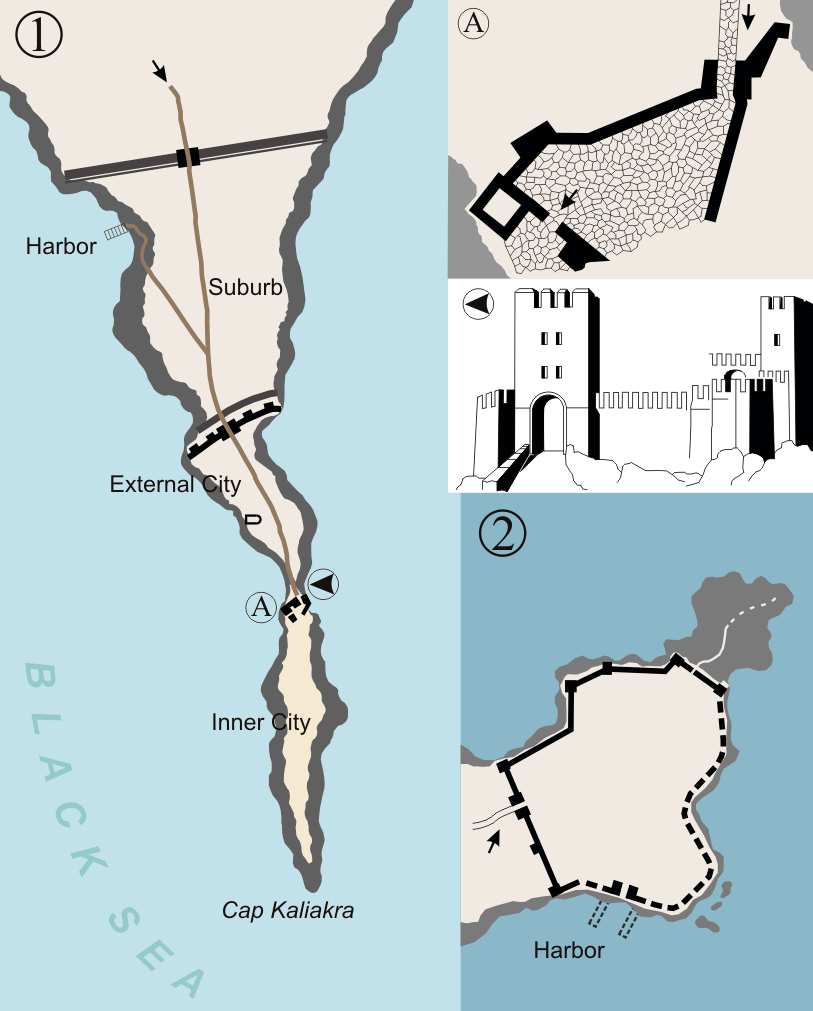

== See also ==
- Kaliakra transmitter
- Cape Emine
- Bulgarian Black Sea Coast
- Caliacra County
