= Turtle Mountain (Alberta) =

Mountain in Alberta, Canada

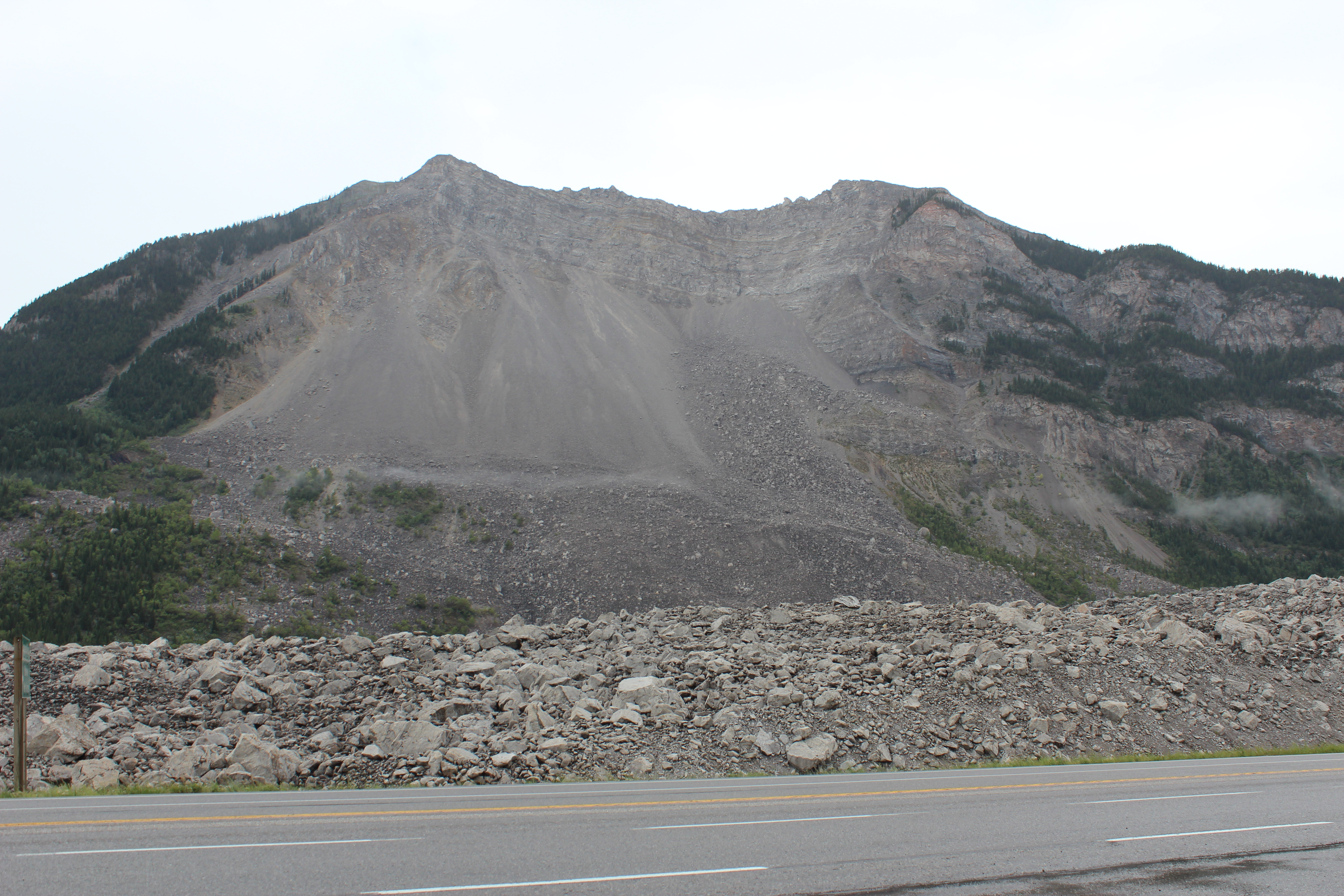
- Turtle Mountain

Highest point
- Elevation: 2,210 m (7,250 ft)
- Prominence: 518 m (1,699 ft)
- Coordinates: 49°34′37″N 114°24′44″W

Geography
- Location within Alberta
- Interactive map of Turtle Mountain
- Location: Alberta, Canada
- Parent range: Blairmore Range
- Topo map: NTS 82G9 Blairmore

Geology
- Mountain type: Limestone

Climbing
- Easiest route: Scramble

Turtle Mountain is a mountain in Alberta, Canada.

It is located in the Crowsnest River Valley and is part of the Blairmore Range of the Canadian Rockies. The headwaters of the Oldman River are found here.

== History ==
Local Indigenous peoples of the area, the Blackfoot and Ktunaxa, have oral traditions referring to the peak as "the mountain that moves."

The chemist B. D. Porritt was born in the area in 1884.

The mountain is most famous for the 1903 Frank Slide in which 30 million cubic metres (82 million tonnes) of limestone broke away from the top of the mountain, burying the East half of the town of Frank and killing about 70 to over 90 of the approximate 600 residents of the town. However, only 12 bodies were ever recovered. The mountain has been monitored since 1903 with the most recent project established in 2003.

== Geology ==
Turtle Mountain is an anticline of Paleozoic Rundle Group carbonates thrust over weaker Mesozoic clastics and coals. Summit fissures at the apex of the anticline likely allowed water to infiltrate and weaken the slightly-soluble carbonates within the mountain face, while the supporting underlying clastics were undermined by valley glaciation followed by erosion from the Crowsnest River.

== Turtle Mountain Monitoring Project & Field Laboratory ==
On April 29, 2003, at the ceremony commemorating the 100th anniversary of the Frank Slide, the Hon. Ralph Klein, Premier of Alberta, announced $1.1 million in funding for a monitoring program on Turtle Mountain.

Implementing the project required a collaborative effort between contractors, the Government of Alberta and universities. Initial stages of the state-of-the-art predictive monitoring system were designed and deployed by March 31, 2005. The Turtle Mountain Monitoring Project was administered by Emergency Management Alberta (EMA), with technical direction from the Energy Resources Conservation Board/Alberta Geological Survey (ERCB/AGS).

As of April 2, 2005, ERCB/AGS assumed responsibility for the long-term operation, maintenance and upgrading of the mountain-monitoring system, as well as facilitating research using the system. Since taking over the project, AGS has reviewed the near–real-time data stream from the sensor network installed on the south peak of Turtle Mountain. The data show corresponding trends between temperature and the slow, long-term creep of South Peak. The present project updates and modernizes some of the components of the more recent monitoring programs, as well as adding newer, more high-tech systems.

== See also ==
- Mountains of Alberta
