= Charles Lawrence Abernethy =

Scottish research physicist

Charles Lawrence Abernethy FRSE (1889–1969) was an American-born Scottish research physicist. He oversaw the creation of the gutta percha golf balls for the North British Rubber Company in Fountainbridge in west Edinburgh and made improvements to golf ball design. He was involved in a legal battle over patenting of golf balls in 1931.

== Life ==
He was born on 7 October 1889, in New York City as the son of Andrew Abernethy (1855–1933), a Scot working in New York, and his wife, Rachel Robertson. After an early education in New York the family returned to Andrew's native town of Clousta, Shetland Islands in 1899. He thereafter attended the Anderson Educational Institute, Lerwick. In 1905, Charles received a bursary to study science at Edinburgh University. He graduated BSc in 1909 and gained an MA(Hons) in 1911. His family moved to Edinburgh in 1914. He taught mathematics and physics at Skerry's College, Edinburgh for the academic year of 1914/15.

During the First World War, he was conscripted as a gunner with the Royal Engineers from 1915 to 1917. He was then transferred to the Royal Arsenal in Woolwich to work as a scientific advisor working on chemical weapons under Major Charles Howard Foulkes.

From 1919, he lectured in mathematics at Edinburgh University while also working at the North British Rubber Company in south-west Edinburgh. In 1922, he was elected as a Fellow of the Royal Society of Edinburgh. His proposers were Ralph Allan Sampson, Benjamin Dawson Porritt, Cargill Gilston Knott and George Alexander Carse. He was then living at Exnaboe on Craiglockhart Avenue in south-west Edinburgh. He later worked as the scientific advisor to Slazenger working on golf balls and tennis balls.

He died in Locharbriggs on 23 December 1969, aged 80.

== Family ==
He was married to Margaret Williamson (1897–1970) from Exnaboe in the Shetland Islands. Their son, Charles Lawrence Abernethy, stood unsuccessfully as a candidate for the Liberal Party for Edinburgh Pentlands in 1964.

His brother William Abernethy served with the Cameron Highlanders in the First World War and was killed on 25 September 1915.

== Publications ==
- X-Rays in the Rubber Industry (1922)
