= Samuel Gebo =

American businessman

Samuel Wilford Gebo (Americanization of the French “Gibeau”) (1862–1940) was an American entrepreneur influential in the early development of the U.S. state of Montana. Born in Canada in 1862, Gebo grew up near Ogdensburg, New York, and lived briefly in Minnesota before settling in Montana in the early 1890s.

Between 1895 and 1897, Sam Gebo's Clarks Fork Coal Company developed the Gebo Mine near present-day Fromberg (originally named Gebo) in Carbon County, Montana. In 1900 he and Butte businessman Henry Frank formed the Canadian American Coal and Coke Company and developed a lucrative coal mine at Frank, Alberta, Canada (the mine was damaged by the Frank Slide in 1903, but soon reopened and remained productive until 1918). After the death of Henry Frank in 1908, the Canadian American Coal and Coke Company was reorganized into the Canadian Consolidated Coal Company with Gebo as its managing director. Gebo also developed the Spring Creek Mine near Lewistown, Montana and the Owl Creek Coal Mine in Gebo, Wyoming. In 1910 Gebo purchased the Citizens’ Electric Company and the Spring Creek Power and Electric Company and merged them with the Lewistown Coal, Gas and Light Company.

Gebo built the large Director's house in Frank in 1901, and also built a 300-acre (1.2 km^{2}) ranch near Fromberg between 1904 and 1908. It included a large brick house and a 9,000 square foot barn (National Register of Historic Places #5000512; Jun 01, 2005). Under pressure from an indictment on federal land fraud charges in Wyoming, Gebo abruptly left for Guatemala (where he developed a marble quarry) in 1913, and his Fromberg ranch was put up for auction. Gebo retired to Seattle in 1927 with his second wife, and he died in 1940 at home from a gas-leak.
