= Henry Frank =

American politician and businessman

Henry L. Frank (c. 1851–1908) was an American politician and businessman based in Montana.

Frank was born in Ohio about 1851, and was of French descent. A self-made entrepreneur who invested in liquor distribution, real estate and mining, he also founded the Silver Bow Electric Light Company, was president of the Butte Water Company, and was the first chairman of the board of trustees of the Montana State School of Mines, a position held until his death.

Henry Frank also co-owned (with Sam Gebo) the Canadian-American Coal and Coke Company which operated a coal mine in the town of Frank, Alberta, Canada. He paid 30,000 for the property and the town was named after him. The mine owned by the company was damaged in the famous Frank Slide of 1903.

Henry Frank was twice mayor of Butte, Montana (1885 - 1887) and a member of the first and second Montana state legislatures representing Silver Bow County. A Democrat, he was the 1896 chairman for the State Central Committee and was elected the presidential elector for Montana. He was nearly nominated for the US Senate in 1901 during a dramatic overnight debate (a clock was smashed so that nomination could be completed before a midnight deadline), eventually supporting Paris Gibson. Henry Frank achieved the 33rd degree of Freemasonry and in 1905 became grand master of the Grand Lodge of Montana, and was also active in the Benevolent and Protective Order of Elks and Knights of Pythias lodges.

Henry L. Frank died under uncertain circumstances in 1908 at age 57 while visiting his mother in Cincinnati, Ohio. There is some suggestion that depression or mental illness contributed to his death.

== Bibliography ==
- Butte Miner August 18, 1908
- The Anaconda Standard August 18, 1908
