= B. D. Porritt =

Benjamin Dawson Porritt FRSE FIC FIP FIRI (26 January 1884 – 28 January 1940) was an early 20th century British chemist and academic author, specialising in the use of rubber. In authorship he is known as B. D. Porritt. He was a keen yachtsman and rugby player.

== Life ==
He was born on 26 January 1884 at Turtle Mountain in Alberta, Canada. He was the son of Herbert Thomas Porritt, from Armley, Yorkshire in Britain. His family returned to Britain soon after his birth and he was educated at Whitgift Grammar School in Croydon in London. In 1903 he entered University College, London studying Chemistry. He graduated BSc in 1906. He then proceeded to gain an MSc and began research with Sir William Ramsay and Sir Norman Collie.

Around 1909 he moved to Edinburgh as a chemist to the North British Rubber Company who had huge works in the Fountainbridge district (mainly making Wellington boots and rubber hot water bottles). He was promoted to Senior Chemist in 1912. In 1916 he became Research Superintendent.

In 1919 he was elected a Fellow of the Royal Society of Edinburgh. His proposers were Sir James Walker, Alexander Lauder, Sir Edmund Taylor Whittaker and Cargill Gilston Knott.

In 1920 he moved back to Croydon taking on the role of Director of the newly formed Research Association of the British Rubber and Tyre Manufacturers. He received the Colwyn Medal for services to Chemistry in 1938.

He remained in this post until his death at 23 Addiscombe Grove East Croydon on 28 January 1940, a few days after his 56th birthday.

== Family ==
He was married with two daughters.

== Publications ==
- The Chemistry of Rubber (1913)
- The Rubber Industry - Past and Present (1919)
- Rubber and Engineering (1925)
- Rubber and its Uses in Building Works (1926)
- Volatile Oxidation Products of Bolata (1927)
- Sound Absorption of Rubber Flooring (1932)
- Rubber: Physical and Chemical Properties (1935)
