= Anderson High School, Lerwick =

Coordinates: 60°09′16″N 1°09′51″W

Anderson High School
- Lerwick, Shetland, ZE1 0GR; Scotland

Information
- Motto: Dö weel and persevere
- Established: 1861
- Head teacher: Robin Calder
- Gender: Mixed
- Age: 11 to 18
- Enrolment: 700-800
- Website: http://www.anderson.shetland.sch.uk/

The Anderson High School (AHS) is a comprehensive secondary school in Lerwick, Shetland, Scotland. The AHS is the largest school in Shetland with around 67 staff and about 800-900 pupils from age 12 to 18.

Pupils transfer to the AHS from other schools throughout Shetland. Pupils are also transferred from junior high schools after S4 (age 16), leading to more pupils in S5 than in S4.

In 2005, the school was awarded Schools of Ambition status.

== History ==
=== Anderson Educational Institute ===
The school was founded as the Anderson Educational Institute by Arthur Anderson, a local entrepreneur and the co-founder of the Peninsular and Oriental Steam Navigation Company (currently P&O Ferries) and officially opened in 1862.

The institute building is situated at the Knab, a peninsula southeast of Lerwick and faces east overlooking the island of Bressay. The style of the building is relative to a French chateau and it had a north and south wing including a house for the headmaster. In 1902, a new central school (now Islesburgh Community Centre) opened and primary pupils moved to the building while the secondary pupils remained in the Anderson Education Institute, this increased the school roll and the headmaster's house was converted into classrooms and a playing field was added in the 1930s.

During World War II, the institute building was requisitioned as a military hospital and the pupils were taken to the central school. After the war, the roll grew to 202 in 1948 and temporary classrooms were erected in the school's grounds. The institute has two halls of residence: Bruce Hostel was built in 1914 which was situated north of the institute building, the Janet Courtney hostel was completed in 1939 and was also requisitioned for military use until 1947, this hostel was used as a halls of residence for the school until 2017 when the new school building was finished.

=== Anderson High School ===
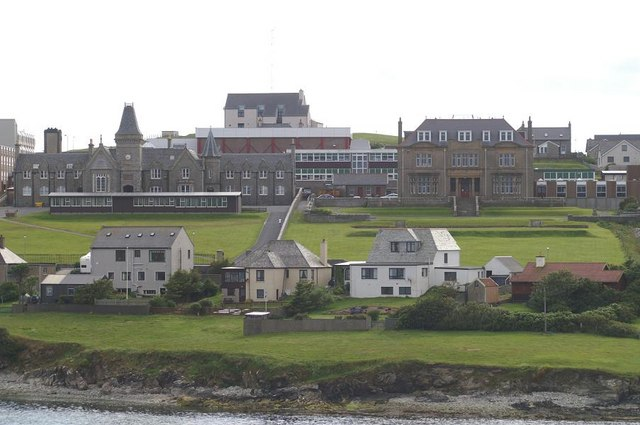
Anderson Education Institute (left), Bruce Hostel (right). 1960s school block and gym hall in the background

In 1970, the educational institute was renamed to the Anderson High School when they made a move to comprehensive education and at this time, there were over 350 pupils in the school. The school building was extended and there was a new school block in the back of the institute, a new gym hall and an assembly hall. In 1977, another gym hall and three large building blocks were added and so was a science block in 1993 and in 2005, a special needs department was built. The original institute building was the school's English department and it contained a school library on the ground floor.

The high school moved to a new location within Lerwick in late October 2017 after a two years of construction, the school building and a new halls of residence are situated north of the Clickimin Loch. The school building is a modern four storey building and can accommodate up to 1000 pupils.

The old school buildings were left abandoned since the pupils moved to the new high school. Demolitions for the buildings were due to begin in early 2020 but were delayed because of the coronavirus pandemic and will start demolishing the 1960s and 1970s school blocks from December 2020 to January 2021, there have been discussions on providing new residential areas in the old school grounds with the original institute, two halls of residence which are listed buildings and the science block where they will likely be used for community use.

=== Arrest and conviction of teacher ===
In 2019, Modern Studies teacher Kieran Malcolmson was arrested for engaging in sexual activity other than sexual intercourse with two students on two occasions between 2009 and 2018. He was convicted in May 2021 and was sentenced to 15 months in prison the following month. Upon appeal this sentence was reduced to 12 months in prison.

== Notable alumni ==
- Charles Lawrence Abernethy, physicist
- Marjolein Robertson, comedian
- Steven Robertson, actor
- Tavish Scott, politician
- Beatrice Wishart, politician
