= Kaliakra transmitter =

Coordinates: 43°23′10″N 28°25′30″E

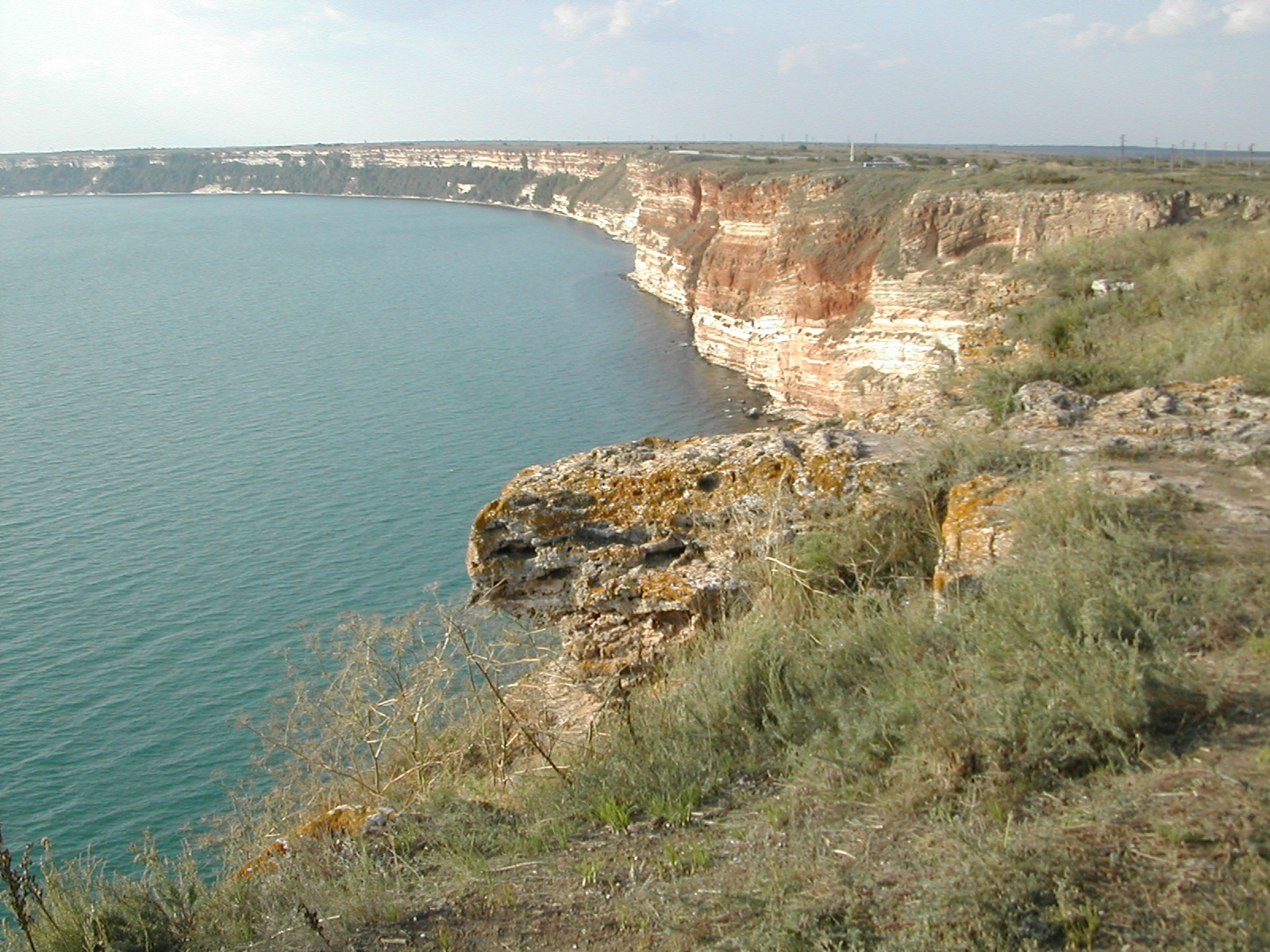
Cape Kaliakra (transmitter site at upper left)

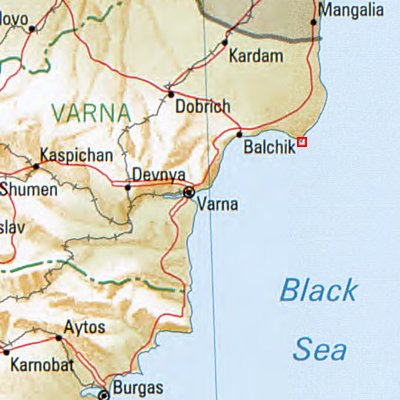
map (Cape Kaliakra marked with red box)

The Kaliakra transmitter was a huge facility for medium wave broadcasting in Bulgaria, which was built after 1988 by the former Soviet Union as a relay transmitter for Southeast Europe. After the collapse of communism in 1989, there was no need for the facility and work was stopped. At that time, nine of the planned 10 masts were already completed and work on the final mast had begun. Some masts were already equipped with cage antennas, while others remained bare.

All masts of the station were grounded guyed lattice masts with a triangular cross section, equipped with a cage antenna. Their height varied between 145 metres (476 ft) and 172 metres (564 ft). The masts could work as either a directional antenna with low pattern by using two masts or as a highly directional antenna by using eight masts.

The broadcasting company of Bulgaria had no interest in using the facility, as it already had several well-equipped high power medium wave broadcasting facilities in several parts of Bulgaria (e.g. in Vakarel, Pleven and Vidin). Foreign services were not interested in using the facility.

In 2001, the station was experimentally used for longwave broadcasting by the Bulgarian broadcasting company, apparently without good results (the company continues to operate its Blaw-Knox radiator at Vakarel). In 2005, FM broadcasting antennas were installed on two masts for use by Radio Varna on 98.2 MHz with 500 W ERP and by Darik Kaliakra on 99.3 MHz with 1 kW ERP.

8 of the 9 masts were dismantled in 2014.
