= Frank, Alberta =

Frank
- Former village
- Location within the Municipality of Crowsnest Pass Location within Alberta
- Coordinates: 49°36′04″N 114°24′22″W
- Country: Canada
- Province: Alberta
- Specialized municipality: Municipality of Crowsnest Pass
- Village: September 3, 1901
- Amalgamated: January 1, 1979

Government
  - Type: Unincorporated
  - Governing body: Municipality of Crowsnest Pass Council

Area (2021)
  - Land: 4.09 km^{2} (1.58 sq mi)

Population (2021)
  - Total: 147
  - Density: 35.9/km^{2} (93/sq mi)
- Time zone: UTC−06:00 (Alberta Time)

Frank is an urban community in the Rocky Mountains within the Municipality of Crowsnest Pass in southwest Alberta, Canada. It was formerly incorporated as a village prior to 1979 when it amalgamated with four other municipalities to form Crowsnest Pass.

== History ==
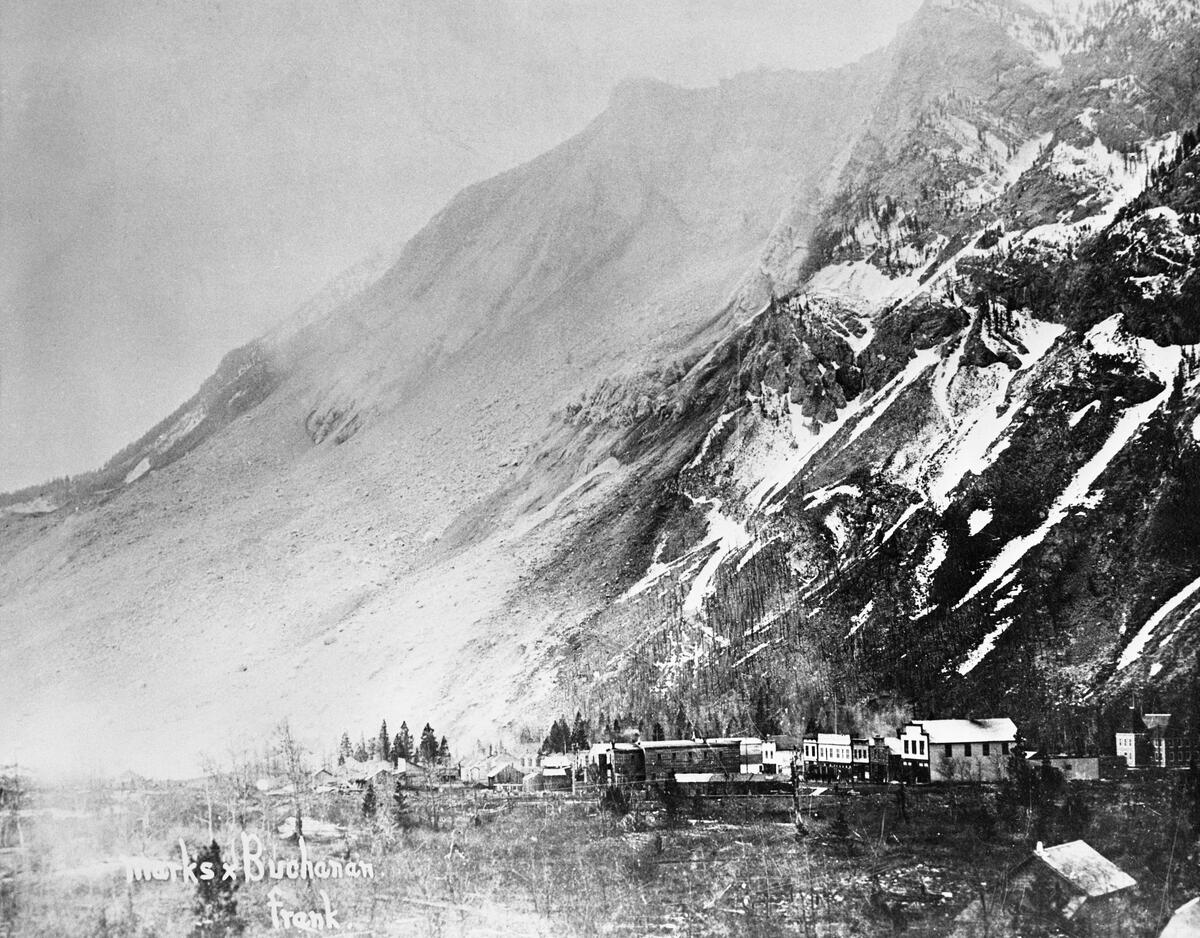
The Frank Slide in 1903

In 1901, American entrepreneurs Sam Gebo and Henry Frank developed the first of many coal mines in the Crowsnest Pass, in the base of Turtle Mountain. In May that year the first buildings were erected in the new community of Frank, located on flat land between the Canadian Pacific Railway tracks and the mine. The community was incorporated as the Village of Frank on September 3, 1901.

The community's grand opening on September 10, 1901 was an all-day event that included sporting competitions (with engraved medals for the victors), tours of the mine, a banquet, and a dance. Two special trains brought in the guests and the gourmet food (including a ton of ice cream). Henry Frank presided over the event, which was attended by the premier Frederick W. A. G. Haultain, his public works minister, and federal Minister of the Interior Clifford Sifton. Frank became the first incorporated village in the Crowsnest Pass and by 1903 served 1,000 people with two dozen businesses and services, a two-story brick school, and a regional post office.

The Frank Slide on April 29, 1903 destroyed much of the mine's infrastructure, several rural businesses, and seven houses on the outskirts of Frank, killing 70–90 people. However the mine reopened within weeks and the rail line was soon re-established through the slide path. Frank continued to boom, and in 1905–06 a new residential subdivision was developed north of the tracks to keep pace with mine production. A new zinc smelter and a new three-story hotel (Rocky Mountains Sanatorium) close to a cold sulphur spring were also constructed. A small zoo was built near the hotel.

However a period of decline soon followed. Due to market forces the zinc smelter never operated, and was converted to an ice skating arena. Fears of a second slide led to a government-ordered closure of the south townsite in 1911, and over the next several years its buildings were torn down or moved. The 1905 subdivision remained, but Frank ceased to be an important centre after the mine closed temporarily in 1912 and permanently in 1917. The sanatorium, converted to a military hospital in 1917, was torn down in 1928 after a period of abandonment. The post office was finally closed in 1968. On November 3, 1978, the Government of Alberta passed the Crowsnest Pass Municipal Unification Act, which led to the formal amalgamation of the Village of Frank with the Village of Bellevue, the Town of Blairmore, the Town of Coleman, and Improvement District (ID) No. 5 on January 1, 1979.

The Frank Slide was designated a Provincial Historical Resource in 1977, and in 1985, the provincial government opened a major interpretive centre in Frank that explains the Frank Slide and the coal mining history of the region. The site of the original Frank townsite is now an industrial park, and many of the historic buildings in the north subdivision are gone, including Gebo's stately mansion and the Catholic church blown down by wind in 1917. But there are a few houses that are over a hundred years old, and visitors can still see pieces of century-old wood-stave water pipes in Gold Creek, part of the foundation of the zinc plant (and the tunnel that connected it to its hilltop chimney), and an antique fire hydrant in the old closed townsite.

== Demographics ==
Population history of Frank

Year	Pop.	±%
1901	19	—
1906	1,178	+6100.0%
1911	806	−31.6%
1916	622	−22.8%
1921	401	−35.5%
1926	299	−25.4%
1931	268	−10.4%

Year	Pop.	±%
1936	258	−3.7%
1941	204	−20.9%
1946	194	−4.9%
1951	239	+23.2%
1956	221	−7.5%
1961	223	+0.9%
1966	178	−20.2%

Year	Pop.	±%
1971	224	+25.8%
1976	201	−10.3%
2001	131	−34.8%
2006	127	−3.1%
2011	112	−11.8%
2016	114	+1.8%
2021	147	+28.9%

Source: Statistics Canada

In the 2021 Census of Population conducted by Statistics Canada, Frank had a population of 147 living in 66 of its 73 total private dwellings, a change of 28.9% from its 2016 population of 114. With a land area of 4.09 km^{2} (1.58 sq mi), it had a population density of 35.9/km^{2} (93.1/sq mi) in 2021.

== See also ==
- List of communities in Alberta
- List of designated places in Alberta
- List of former urban municipalities in Alberta
