= Bolata =

Bolata cove залив Болата
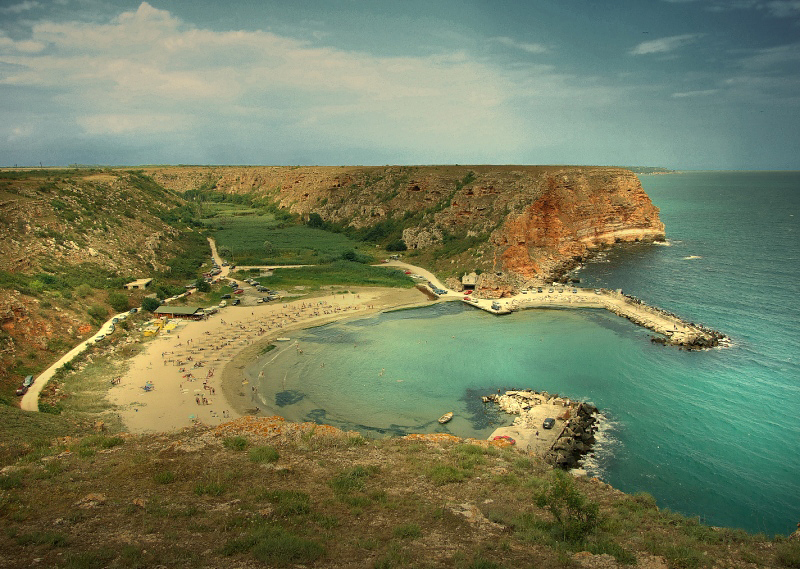
- Aerial view

- Location of Bolata cove
- Coordinates: 43°22′55″N 28°28′15″E
- Country: Bulgaria
- Provinces (Oblast): Dobrich
- Municipality (Obshtina): Kavarna

Government
- Time zone: UTC+2 (EET)
  - Summer (DST): UTC+3 (EEST)

Bolata (Bulgarian: Болата) is a small cove and Nature reserve located in the Northern Bulgarian Black Sea Coast.

Bolata is a locality located in the bay of the same name and is part of the Kaliakra Reserve. It is located in the northern part of the Bulgarian Black Sea coast near the village of Bulgarevo and near a former military station.

The area is a wetland of great importance for few rare plant and animal species. The sandy beach is of natural origin and is unique for scandalous shores in the Kaliakra area. A small river has created a narrow gorge and flows into the swamp "Bolata" (Lake Bolata) with an area of 23 ha, covered with a vast mass of reeds. The limestone rocks in the area should be red in color, creating iron oxides in the clay that fill their cracks. The bay is part of the Natura 2000 Kaliakra Complex protected area.

== Bolata Cove ==
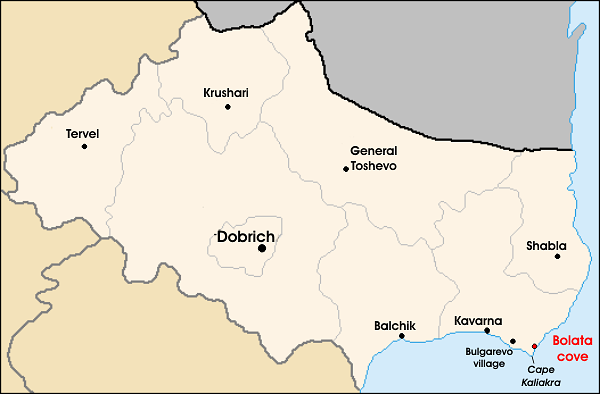
Bolata within Dobrich Province

Bolata cove is located at the northern rocky coastline of the Bulgarian seaside. It is 3 km to the north of the Kaliakra headland. The nearest settlements are Bulgarevo village in about 5 km distance and the town of Kavarna in 13 km to the west.

The place represents a small cove with a semi-circular shape, featuring a sandy beach. All this is between a brick-colored high cliffs at the end of a rocky canyon. There is a very small river flowing into the sea.

This is the only approachable place where the sea can be reached for kilometers of cliffs spread out northwards and southwards.

== History ==
In the caves around are found remnants of an ancient settlement dated as far back as 4th century B.C. In the area of Bolata was also found a Maltese cross which testify to the foreign trade relation of the Second Bulgarian Empire with the Republic of Venice and Genoa.

During the communist regime, on the right side of the canyon above the cove, there was built a top secret base. That's why few people knew about the place. There is some talk about a telephone cable that started from here and through the cove and sea connected leaders of Bulgaria and Soviet Union. The semi-abandoned buildings and a watch-tower can be seen nowadays on the plateau around Bolata.

== The Reserve ==
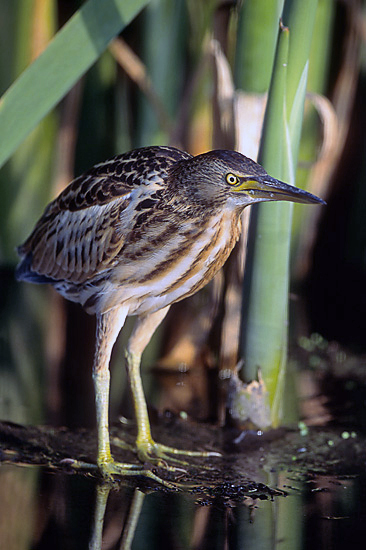
Little bittern (Ixobrychus minutus)

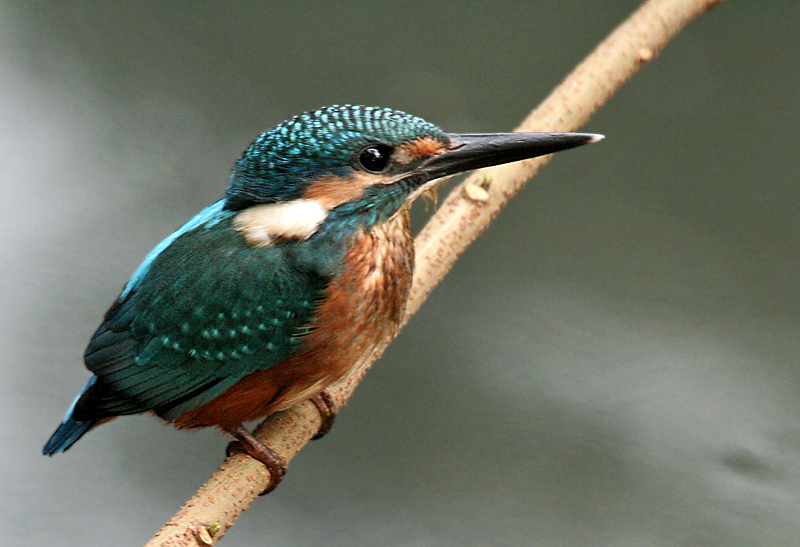
Common kingfisher (Alcedo atthis)

In the sky of Bolata cove passes the so-called Via Pontica one of the main roads (north to south) of the migratory birds. Bolata is the only reserve in Bulgaria that includes sea area in its territory. Many interesting species make their nests here. Among them are:

- Little bittern (Ixobrychus minutus)
- Little grebe (Tachybaptus ruficollis)
- Common kingfisher (Alcedo atthis)
- Mallard (Anas platyrhynchos)
- Tufted duck (Aythya fuligula)
- Grey heron (Ardea cinerea)

In the area of Kaliakra and Bolata can be often seen short-beaked common dolphin (Delphinus delphis).

Of the herbaceous species, common ginger, bulbous meadow, common reed, other cereals, and others are found. Characteristic of the area are shrubs, cup-tufts, fights, jasmine shrubs and more.

Several species of amphibians and reptiles are found, such as protected species of Syrian garlic, brown toad, spiked turtle.

Above the lake passes Via Pontica, one of the largest airways of migratory birds throughout Europe. Therefore, nesting or passing waterfowl can be observed in the bay - a small water bull, a small diver, a tern, a large cormorant, a river tern, a white-tailed duck and other species of ducks and geese.

Cracks and niches are important habitats for bats and steppe mammals, which are typical for the area, white-bellied white-tooth, small white-tooth, common gray voles and more. Plain dolphin can be observed in the waters near the bay

=== Culture and tourism ===
Remains of an ancient settlement and evidence of life dating back to 400 BC have been found in the caves of Bolata, as well as the Maltese Cross - a testimony to the trade of the Second Bulgarian Kingdom with Venice and Genoa. Also discovered are stone circles, sacrificial stones, rock caves - dwellings. The beach is also widely known as a dive site. A steep path to the north ascends to the top of the rock wall, offering a view of the entire gorge.

Today the beach is popular with locals and tourists alike. It has sand and warm, clean water. Behind the beach, however, the remnants of a once-public establishment and public toilet (still used today) spoil the experience. Humans have left junk in the area, which can harm the beach.

=== Gallery ===
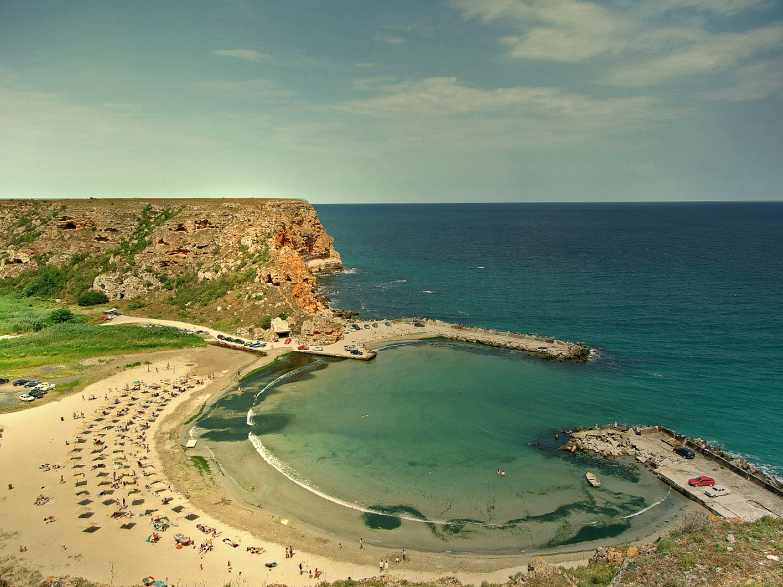
Bolata beach

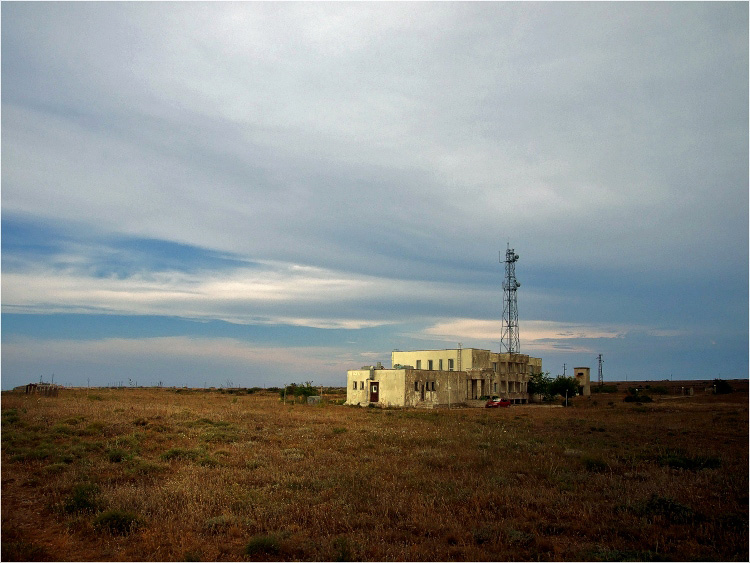
the ex-secret base

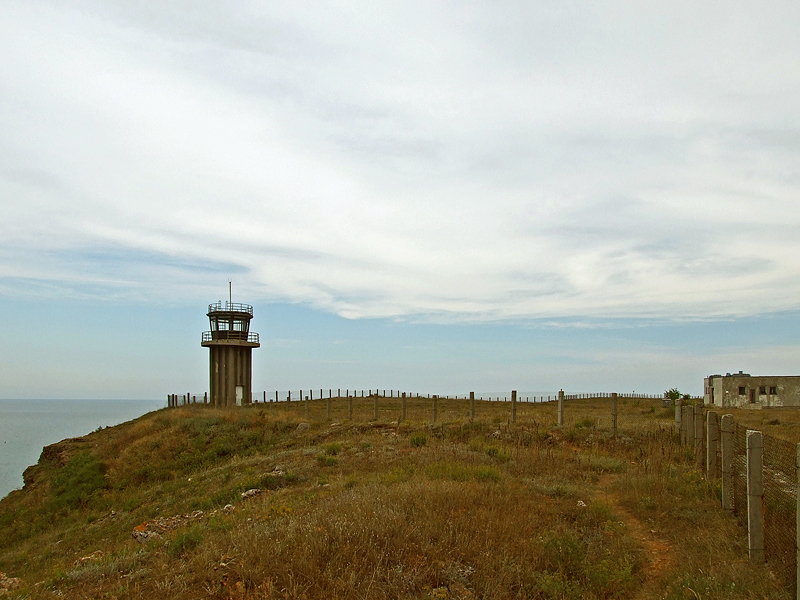
the watch-tower on the edge of the plateau

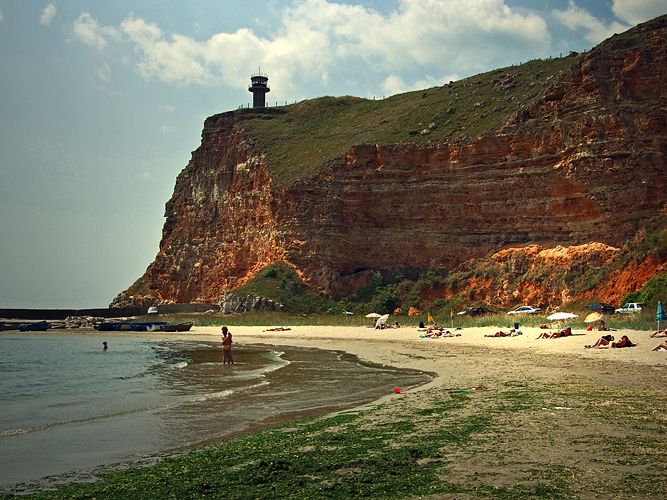
