= Battle River—Crowfoot =

Federal electoral district in Alberta, Canada

Alberta electoral district
- Interactive map of riding boundaries from the 2025 federal election

Federal electoral district
- Legislature: House of Commons
MP
Pierre Poilievre
Conservative
- District created: 2013
- First contested: 2015
- Last contested: 2025 by-election
- District webpage: profile, map

Demographics
- Population (2021): 107,979
- Electors (2019): 81,123
- Area (km²): 51,977.75
- Pop. density (per km²): 2.1
- Census division(s): Division No. 5, Division No. 7, Division No. 10, Division No. 11
- Census subdivision(s): Acadia No. 34, Acme, Alliance, Amisk, Bawlf, Bashaw, Beaver County, Big Valley, Bittern Lake, Camrose, Camrose County, Carbon, Castor, Chauvin, Consort, Coronation, Czar, Daysland, Delia, Donalda, Drumheller, Edberg, Edgerton, Flagstaff County, Forestburg, Halkirk, Hanna, Hay Lakes, Heisler, Holden, Hughenden, Irma, Killam, Kneehill County, Linden, Lougheed, Morrin, Munson, Oyen, Paintearth County No. 18, Provost, Provost No. 52, Rochon Sands, Rosalind, Ryley, Special Area No. 2, Special Area No. 3, Special Area No. 4, Starland County, Stettler, Stettler County No. 6, Three Hills, Tofield, Trochu, Veteran, Viking, Wainwright, Wainwright No. 61, White Sands, Youngstown

Battle River—Crowfoot is a federal electoral district in Alberta. It covers a large portion of rural east-central Alberta, and has been represented in the House of Commons of Canada since 2015.

Battle River—Crowfoot and its predecessor ridings have a long history of being among the most heavily conservative ridings in the country. Candidates from right-wing parties have consistently secured over three-fourths of the vote since the 1970s.

== Geography ==
Battle River—Crowfoot is a rural riding, located in east-central Alberta. Its largest city is Camrose. It stretches from the Highway 14 corridor in the north to the Red Deer River and beyond in the south. The riding stretches from the Saskatchewan border in the east to the Highway 56 corridor in the west.

The riding contains the municipal districts of Beaver County, Wainwright No. 61, Camrose County, Flagstaff County, Provost No. 52, Stettler County No. 6, Paintearth County No. 18, Kneehill County, Starland County, Acadia No. 34, Special Areas No. 2, 3 and 4, all of the cities towns and villages enclosed in those municipal districts, plus the Town of Drumheller.

== Demographics ==
According to the 2021 Canadian census, 2023 representation order

Racial groups: 88.5% White, 5.3% Indigenous, 2.8% Filipino
Languages: 90.0% English, 4.1% German, 1.3% Tagalog, 1.2% French
Religions: 58.7% Christian (16.7% Catholic, 9.2% United Church, 6.4% Lutheran, 2.5% Anglican, 1.6% Baptist, 1.3% Pentecostal, 1.2% Anabaptist, 19.8% Other), 39.9% None
Median income: $41,200 (2020)
Average income: $51,650 (2020)

== History ==
Battle River—Crowfoot was created by the 2012 federal electoral boundaries redistribution and was legally defined in the 2013 representation order. It came into effect upon the call of the 2015 Canadian federal election. It was created out of parts of the electoral districts of Crowfoot, Vegreville—Wainwright, Medicine Hat and Wetaskiwin. At the time of its creation, the riding contained the municipal districts of Beaver County, Wainwright No. 61, Camrose County, Flagstaff County, Provost No. 52, Stettler County No. 6, Paintearth County No. 18, Starland County, Acadia No. 34, Special Areas No. 2, 3 and 4, Leduc County east of Highway 21, the northern half of Kneehill County (including Three Hills and Trochu), all of the cities towns and villages enclosed in those municipal districts, plus the Town of Drumheller.

Following the 2022 Canadian federal electoral redistribution, the riding gained the remainder of Kneehill County, including the villages of Linden, Acme and Carbon from Bow River, and lost all of its territory in Leduc County to Leduc—Wetaskiwin.

=== Electoral history ===
Even by the standards of rural Alberta, Battle River—Crowfoot is a heavily conservative area. The riding and its predecessors, Acadia, Battle River, Battle River—Camrose, Camrose, and Crowfoot, have been represented by right-leaning MPs for all but two years since 1935, and the major right-wing party of the day has usually won here in massive landslides.

Since the 1990s, the major right-wing party of the day has won by some of the largest margins ever recorded in Canadian politics, with other parties lucky to get 30 percent of the vote between them. The Conservative Party of Canada has kept this tradition going since its formation in 2003. Its candidates in what is now Battle River—Crowfoot have consistently secured some of the largest vote shares and largest margins of victory in the country.

| Year | Party | Candidate | Vote share | Margin | Vote share rank | Margin rank |
|---|---|---|---|---|---|---|
| 2025 by-election | Conservative | Pierre Poilievre | 80.9% | 71.1% | —N/a | |
| 2025 | Conservative | Damien Kurek | 82.8% | 71.1% | 2nd | 2nd |
| 2021 | Conservative | Damien Kurek | 71.3% | 61.5% | 3rd | 2nd |
| 2019 | Conservative | Damien Kurek | 85.5% | 80.4% | 1st | 1st |
| 2015 | Conservative | Kevin Sorenson | 80.1% | 71.5% | 2nd (Note: Ranked 1st among right of centre party candidates.) | 2nd |
| 2011 | Conservative | Kevin Sorenson | 84.0% | 74.8% | 1st | 1st |
| 2008 | Conservative | Kevin Sorenson | 82.0% | 74.1% | 1st | 1st |
| 2006 | Conservative | Kevin Sorenson | 82.6% | 75.2% | 1st | 1st |
| 2004 | Conservative | Kevin Sorenson | 80.2% | 72.5% | 1st | 1st |
| 2000 | Alliance | Kevin Sorenson | 70.6% | 56.4% | 13th | 14th |
| 1997 | Reform | Jack Ramsay | 71.0% | 55.5% | 5th | 6th |

(Results before 2015 are for Crowfoot)

Its first member, Kevin Sorenson, was first elected for Crowfoot in 2000 with 70 percent of the vote–the only time that he garnered less than 80 percent of the vote. He was succeeded by Damien Kurek, won in 2019 with more than 85% of the vote. He was reelected in 2021 with 70 percent of the vote, the lowest vote share for the Conservatives or their predecessors in two decades. Even then, no other candidate managed even 10 percent of the vote.

In 2025, Kurek announced his intention to resign to provide a vacancy which could allow Conservative leader Pierre Poilievre a chance to run in Battle River—Crowfoot, which triggered a by-election. Poilievre had lost his bid for reelection in his old riding of Carleton, and sought to return to the House by running in a safe riding. Kurek subsequently resigned on June 17. As expected, Poilievre won the August 18 by-election handily with almost 81 percent of the vote; no other candidate cleared 10 percent.

== Members of Parliament ==
This riding has elected the following members of the House of Commons of Canada:

| Parliament | Years | Member | Party |
|---|---|---|---|
Battle River—Crowfoot; Riding created from Crowfoot, Vegreville—Wainwright, Medicine Hat and Wetaskiwin
| 42nd | 2015–2019 | Kevin Sorenson | Conservative |
| 43rd | 2019–2021 | Damien Kurek | Conservative |
| 44th | 2021–2025 | Damien Kurek | Conservative |
| 45th | 2025–2025 | Damien Kurek | Conservative |
| 45th | 2025–present | Pierre Poilievre | Conservative |

== Election results ==
Graph of election results in Battle River—Crowfoot (minor parties that never got 2% of the vote or didn't run consistently are omitted)

=== 2023 representation order ===
Canadian federal by-election, August 18, 2025 Resignation of Damien Kurek
| Party | Candidate | Votes | % | ±% |
|---|---|---|---|---|
| Conservative | Pierre Poilievre | 41,308 | 80.86 | -1.98 |
| Independent | Bonnie Critchley | 5,018 | 9.82 | – |
| Liberal | Darcy Spady | 2,095 | 4.10 | -7.57 |
| New Democratic | Katherine Swampy | 1,061 | 2.08 | -1.10 |
| United | Grant Abraham | 757 | 1.48 | – |
| People's | Jonathan Bridges | 138 | 0.27 | -1.31 |
| Green | Ashley MacDonald | 116 | 0.23 | -0.50 |
| Libertarian | Michael Harris | 103 | 0.20 | – |
| Christian Heritage | Jeff Willerton | 92 | 0.18 | – |
| Independent | Sarah Spanier | 49 | 0.10 | – |
| Marijuana | Kenneth Kirk | 40 | 0.08 | – |
| Centrist | Ahmed Hassan | 15 | 0.03 | – |
| Independent | Bert William Westergard | 11 | 0.02 | – |
| Independent | Breccan Zimmer | 11 | 0.02 | – |
| Independent | Dillon Anderson | 10 | 0.02 | – |
| Independent | Nicole Betts | 7 | 0.01 | – |
| Independent | Nickolas Meuters-Murphy | 7 | 0.01 | – |
| Independent | Diane Prentice | 7 | 0.01 | – |
| Independent | Glen Armstrong | 6 | 0.01 | – |
| Independent | Caitlyn Baker | 6 | 0.01 | – |
| Independent | Lisa Parsons | 6 | 0.01 | – |
| Independent | Jason Buzzell | 5 | 0.01 | – |
| Independent | Jenny Cartwright | 5 | 0.01 | – |
| Independent | Deborah Chalmers | 5 | 0.01 | – |
| Independent | William Grant | 5 | 0.01 | – |
| Independent | Paul Jones | 5 | 0.01 | – |
| Independent | Brennen Perry | 5 | 0.01 | – |
| Independent | Anthony Perullo | 5 | 0.01 | – |
| Independent | Myles René Laurent St. Pierre | 5 | 0.01 | – |
| Independent | Fraser Anderson | 4 | 0.01 | – |
| Independent | Rebecca Boyce | 4 | 0.01 | – |
| Independent | Pierre Gauthier | 4 | 0.01 | – |
| Independent | Preston Hoff | 4 | 0.01 | – |
| Independent | Mark Ruthenberg | 4 | 0.01 | – |
| Independent | Ceilidh Stewart | 4 | 0.01 | – |
| Independent | Danica Boe | 3 | 0.01 | – |
| Independent | Aaron Bowles | 3 | 0.01 | – |
| Independent | Sarah Burke | 3 | 0.01 | – |
| Independent | David Cherniak | 3 | 0.01 | – |
| Independent | John Dale | 3 | 0.01 | – |
| Independent | Emily Goose | 3 | 0.01 | – |
| Independent | Corey Hales | 3 | 0.01 | – |
| Independent | Grace Pender | 3 | 0.01 | – |
| Independent | Noah Reid | 3 | 0.01 | – |
| Independent | David Sader | 3 | 0.01 | – |
| Independent | Molly Sun | 3 | 0.01 | – |
| Independent | Nicola Zoghbi | 3 | 0.01 | – |
| Independent | Alex Banks | 2 | 0.00 | – |
| Independent | Stacy Lynn Billingsley | 2 | 0.00 | – |
| Independent | Marten Borch | 2 | 0.00 | – |
| Independent | Jakeb Brown | 2 | 0.00 | – |
| Independent | Annelies Cooper | 2 | 0.00 | – |
| Independent | Hannah DeWolfe | 2 | 0.00 | – |
| Independent | Elizabeth Dupuis | 2 | 0.00 | – |
| Independent | Kenneth Durham | 2 | 0.00 | – |
| Independent | Michael Dyck | 2 | 0.00 | – |
| Independent | Katherine Dyson | 2 | 0.00 | – |
| Independent | Michael Louis Fitzgerald | 2 | 0.00 | – |
| Independent | Daniel Gagnon | 2 | 0.00 | – |
| Independent | Kerri Hildebrandt | 2 | 0.00 | – |
| Independent | Elsie Kipp | 2 | 0.00 | – |
| Independent | Chris Kowalchuk | 2 | 0.00 | – |
| Independent | Johnson Hon Wa Lee | 2 | 0.00 | – |
| Independent | Maria Light | 2 | 0.00 | – |
| Independent | Derek Adam MacKay | 2 | 0.00 | – |
| Independent | Jeffrey McLean | 2 | 0.00 | – |
| Independent | Riley Moss | 2 | 0.00 | – |
| Independent | Kimberley Nugent | 2 | 0.00 | – |
| Independent | Alexander Panchuk | 2 | 0.00 | – |
| Independent | Yagya Parihar | 2 | 0.00 | – |
| Independent | Samuel Pignedoli | 2 | 0.00 | – |
| Independent | Lorant Polya | 2 | 0.00 | – |
| Independent | Jayson Roy | 2 | 0.00 | – |
| Independent | Adam Smith | 2 | 0.00 | – |
| Independent | Patrick Strzalkowski | 2 | 0.00 | – |
| Independent | Callan Wassenaar | 2 | 0.00 | – |
| Independent | Jeremy Wedel | 2 | 0.00 | – |
| Independent | Hazel Westwood | 2 | 0.00 | – |
| Independent | Nicholas Ashmore | 1 | 0.00 | – |
| Independent | Michael Bednarski | 1 | 0.00 | – |
| Independent | Lilia Boisvert | 1 | 0.00 | – |
| Independent | Alain Bourgault | 1 | 0.00 | – |
| Independent | Eva Bowering | 1 | 0.00 | – |
| Independent | Joshua Brauner | 1 | 0.00 | – |
| Independent | Alexandre Brochu | 1 | 0.00 | – |
| Independent | Chun Chen | 1 | 0.00 | – |
| Independent | Shawn Clendining | 1 | 0.00 | – |
| Independent | Lindsay Elaine Shyla Colosimo | 1 | 0.00 | – |
| Independent | Dylan Colquhoun | 1 | 0.00 | – |
| Independent | Jayson Cowan | 1 | 0.00 | – |
| Independent | Michael Davis | 1 | 0.00 | – |
| Independent | Geneviève Dorval | 1 | 0.00 | – |
| Independent | Jordan Drew | 1 | 0.00 | – |
| Independent | Murray Dunham | 1 | 0.00 | – |
| Independent | Eric Duong | 1 | 0.00 | – |
| Independent | Mark Eccleston | 1 | 0.00 | – |
| Independent | Jeremy Edwards | 1 | 0.00 | – |
| Independent | Allison Fanjoy | 1 | 0.00 | – |
| Independent | Gabriel Finn | 1 | 0.00 | – |
| Independent | Hubert Fischer | 1 | 0.00 | – |
| Independent | Matthew Gillies | 1 | 0.00 | – |
| Independent | Peter Gorman | 1 | 0.00 | – |
| Independent | Jacqueline Grabowski | 1 | 0.00 | – |
| Independent | Andrew Guenther | 1 | 0.00 | – |
| Independent | Blake Hamilton | 1 | 0.00 | – |
| Independent | Jason Hodgson | 1 | 0.00 | – |
| Independent | Dakota Hourie | 1 | 0.00 | – |
| Independent | Uneeb Islam | 1 | 0.00 | – |
| Independent | Michael Jones | 1 | 0.00 | – |
| Independent | Richard Kenkel | 1 | 0.00 | – |
| Independent | Madison Kennedy | 1 | 0.00 | – |
| Independent | Abraham Lau | 1 | 0.00 | – |
| Independent | Charles Lemieux | 1 | 0.00 | – |
| Independent | Robert Marsden | 1 | 0.00 | – |
| Independent | Agnieszka Marszalek | 1 | 0.00 | – |
| Independent | Geoffrey Meens | 1 | 0.00 | – |
| Independent | Sophia Nguyen | 1 | 0.00 | – |
| Independent | Pascal Noël | 1 | 0.00 | – |
| Independent | Steve Oates | 1 | 0.00 | – |
| Independent | Lény Painchaud | 1 | 0.00 | – |
| Independent | Lanna Palsson | 1 | 0.00 | – |
| Independent | Céline Paquin | 1 | 0.00 | – |
| Independent | Meagan Roberge | 1 | 0.00 | – |
| Independent | Melanie Roberge | 1 | 0.00 | – |
| Independent | Mark Russell | 1 | 0.00 | – |
| Independent | Kayll Schaefer | 1 | 0.00 | – |
| Independent | Hakim Sheriff | 1 | 0.00 | – |
| Independent | Eric Shorten | 1 | 0.00 | – |
| Independent | Bradley Stewart | 1 | 0.00 | – |
| Independent | Mário Stocco | 1 | 0.00 | – |
| Independent | Faith Tabladillo | 1 | 0.00 | – |
| Independent | Alex Vallée | 1 | 0.00 | – |
| Independent | Dennis Vanmeer | 1 | 0.00 | – |
| Independent | Bryan Wang | 1 | 0.00 | – |
| Independent | Joshua Wong | 1 | 0.00 | – |
| Independent | Yao ZhangLi | 1 | 0.00 | – |
| Independent | David Zhu | 1 | 0.00 | – |
| Independent | Barry Zukewich | 1 | 0.00 | – |
| Independent | Marthalee Aykroyd | 0 | 0.00 | – |
| Independent | Line Bélanger | 0 | 0.00 | – |
| Independent | Michel Bélanger | 0 | 0.00 | – |
| Independent | Jeani Boudreault | 0 | 0.00 | – |
| Independent | Jeffery Brazeau | 0 | 0.00 | – |
| Independent | Bo Cai | 0 | 0.00 | – |
| Independent | Cameron Campos | 0 | 0.00 | – |
| Independent | Nicolas Champagne | 0 | 0.00 | – |
| Independent | Jaël Champagne Gareau | 0 | 0.00 | – |
| Independent | Claude Cordon Pichilla | 0 | 0.00 | – |
| Independent | Tristan Dell | 0 | 0.00 | – |
| Independent | Gerrit Dogger | 0 | 0.00 | – |
| Independent | Abel Erazo-Ibarra | 0 | 0.00 | – |
| Independent | Tracy Farber | 0 | 0.00 | – |
| Independent | Brian Farrenkopf | 0 | 0.00 | – |
| Independent | Thomas Fitzgerald | 0 | 0.00 | – |
| Independent | Connor Fullerton | 0 | 0.00 | – |
| Independent | Jordan Gerrard | 0 | 0.00 | – |
| Independent | Eric Gilmour | 0 | 0.00 | – |
| Independent | Laurie Goble | 0 | 0.00 | – |
| Independent | David Patrick Greene | 0 | 0.00 | – |
| Independent | Nicolette Gross | 0 | 0.00 | – |
| Independent | Kathleen Gudmundsson | 0 | 0.00 | – |
| Independent | Richard Haley | 0 | 0.00 | – |
| Independent | Kazimir Haykowsky | 0 | 0.00 | – |
| Independent | Iriella Hicks | 0 | 0.00 | – |
| Independent | Loren Hicks | 0 | 0.00 | – |
| Independent | Seyed Hosseini Lavasani | 0 | 0.00 | – |
| Independent | Glendyn Howse | 0 | 0.00 | – |
| Independent | Ryan Huard | 0 | 0.00 | – |
| Independent | Jack Jean-Louis | 0 | 0.00 | – |
| Independent | Derek Jouppi | 0 | 0.00 | – |
| Independent | Erich Jurgens | 0 | 0.00 | – |
| Independent | Elza Kephart | 0 | 0.00 | – |
| Independent | Dannielle Konkle | 0 | 0.00 | – |
| Independent | Solomon Krygier-Paine | 0 | 0.00 | – |
| Independent | Andrew Kulas | 0 | 0.00 | – |
| Independent | Samuel Lafontaine | 0 | 0.00 | – |
| Independent | Alain Lamontagne | 0 | 0.00 | – |
| Independent | Eric Laverdure | 0 | 0.00 | – |
| Independent | Jocelyn LeBlanc-Courchaine | 0 | 0.00 | – |
| Independent | Alexander Lein | 0 | 0.00 | – |
| Independent | Renée Lemieux | 0 | 0.00 | – |
| Independent | Jeffrey Leroux | 0 | 0.00 | – |
| Independent | Litma Kai Ching Leung | 0 | 0.00 | – |
| Independent | Cedric Ludlow | 0 | 0.00 | – |
| Independent | Jennifer Margaret Mackenzie-Miller | 0 | 0.00 | – |
| Independent | Nicolas Maltais | 0 | 0.00 | – |
| Independent | Kevin Manzano | 0 | 0.00 | – |
| Independent | Eric March | 0 | 0.00 | – |
| Independent | Devin McManus | 0 | 0.00 | – |
| Independent | Robert Melting Tallow | 0 | 0.00 | – |
| Independent | Joanne L Metters | 0 | 0.00 | – |
| Independent | Nicholas Mew | 0 | 0.00 | – |
| Independent | Mark Moutter | 0 | 0.00 | – |
| Independent | Rob Mumford | 0 | 0.00 | – |
| Independent | Molly Munn | 0 | 0.00 | – |
| Independent | Sam Nabi | 0 | 0.00 | – |
| Independent | John Francis O'Flynn | 0 | 0.00 | – |
| Independent | Clifford Pine | 0 | 0.00 | – |
| Independent | Brian Ramchandar | 0 | 0.00 | – |
| Independent | Spencer Rocchi | 0 | 0.00 | – |
| Independent | Wallace Richard Rowat | 0 | 0.00 | – |
| Independent | Barry Rueger | 0 | 0.00 | – |
| Independent | Chris Scrimes | 0 | 0.00 | – |
| Independent | Charles Douglas Sleep | 0 | 0.00 | – |
| Independent | Julie St-Amand | 0 | 0.00 | – |
| Independent | Pascal St-Amand | 0 | 0.00 | – |
| Independent | Andi Sweet | 0 | 0.00 | – |
| Independent | Corinne Unrau | 0 | 0.00 | – |
| Independent | Tyson Warner | 0 | 0.00 | – |
| Independent | Simon John Edwin Wedel | 0 | 0.00 | – |
| Independent | Michaiah Williams | 0 | 0.00 | – |
| Independent | Brian Wishart | 0 | 0.00 | – |
| Independent | Michael Wisniewski | 0 | 0.00 | – |
| Independent | Belinda Christine Young | 0 | 0.00 | – |
| Total valid votes | | 51,085 | 99.59 | – |
| Total rejected ballots | | 211 | 0.41 | -0.19 |
| Turnout | | 51,296 | 59.83 | -16.66 |
| Eligible voters | | 85,736 | – | |
| Conservative hold | | Swing | | – |
Source: Elections Canada

2025 Canadian federal election
| Party | Candidate | Votes | % | ±% | Expenditures |
|---|---|---|---|---|---|
| Conservative | Damien Kurek | 53,684 | 82.84 | +11.55 | $91,654.90 |
| Liberal | Brent Sutton | 7,566 | 11.67 | +7.38 | $3,126.03 |
| New Democratic | James MacKay | 2,061 | 3.18 | –6.52 | none listed |
| People's | Jonathan Bridges | 1,022 | 1.58 | –7.69 | $4.50 |
| Green | Douglas Gook | 474 | 0.73 | –0.21 | none listed |
| Total valid votes/expense limit | | 64,807 | 99.40 | – | $159,014.07 |
| Total rejected ballots | | 391 | 0.60 | +0.16 | |
| Turnout | | 65,198 | 74.45 | +2.67 | |
| Eligible voters | | 87,578 | | | |
| Conservative hold | | Swing | | +9.47 | |
Source: Elections Canada

2021 federal election redistributed results
| Party | Vote | % |
|---|---|---|
| Conservative | 42,531 | 71.38 |
| New Democratic | 5,782 | 9.70 |
| People's | 5,556 | 9.33 |
| Liberal | 2,536 | 4.26 |
| Maverick | 2,440 | 4.10 |
| Green | 545 | 0.91 |
| Veterans Coalition | 176 | 0.30 |
| Christian Heritage | 15 | 0.03 |
| Total valid votes | 59,581 | 98.56 |
| Rejected ballots | 262 | 0.44 |
| Registered voters/ estimated turnout | 83,685 | 71.51 |

=== 2013 representation order ===
2021 Canadian federal election
| Party | Candidate | Votes | % | ±% | Expenditures |
|---|---|---|---|---|---|
| Conservative | Damien Kurek | 41,819 | 71.29 | –14.20 | $97,164.96 |
| New Democratic | Tonya Ratushniak | 5,761 | 9.82 | +4.71 | $1,764.29 |
| People's | Dennis Trepanier | 5,440 | 9.27 | +6.67 | $1,916.25 |
| Liberal | Leah Diane McLeod | 2,515 | 4.29 | +0.19 | $2,023.58 |
| Maverick | Jeff Golka | 2,393 | 4.08 | – | $28,982.24 |
| Green | Daniel Brisbin | 554 | 0.94 | –1.77 | $234.04 |
| Veterans Coalition | John Irwin | 178 | 0.30 | – | none listed |
| Total valid votes/expense limit | | 58,660 | 99.56 | – | $135,622.71 |
| Total rejected ballots | | 260 | 0.44 | –0.12 | |
| Turnout | | 58,920 | 71.77 | –3.66 | |
| Eligible voters | | 82,090 | | | |
| Conservative hold | | Swing | | –9.45 | |
Source: Elections Canada

2019 Canadian federal election
| Party | Candidate | Votes | % | ±% | Expenditures |
|---|---|---|---|---|---|
| Conservative | Damien Kurek | 53,309 | 85.49 | +4.58 | $56,911.61 |
| New Democratic | Natasha Fryzuk | 3,185 | 5.11 | –1.43 | none listed |
| Liberal | Dianne Clarke | 2,557 | 4.10 | –5.27 | none listed |
| Green | Geordie Nelson | 1,689 | 2.71 | –0.47 | $2,467.23 |
| People's | David A. Michaud | 1,620 | 2.60 | – | none listed |
| Total valid votes/expense limit | | 62,360 | 99.44 | – | $132,092.34 |
| Total rejected ballots | | 352 | 0.56 | +0.29 | |
| Turnout | | 62,712 | 75.43 | +3.34 | |
| Eligible voters | | 83,139 | | | |
| Conservative hold | | Swing | | +3.01 | |
Source: Elections Canada

2015 Canadian federal election
| Party | Candidate | Votes | % | ±% | Expenditures |
|---|---|---|---|---|---|
| Conservative | Kevin Sorenson | 47,552 | 80.91 | –2.18 | $39,101.55 |
| Liberal | Andy Kowalski | 5,505 | 9.37 | +7.21 | $1,133.54 |
| New Democratic | Katherine Swampy | 3,844 | 6.54 | –3.30 | $9,738.25 |
| Green | Gary Kelly | 1,868 | 3.18 | –0.72 | $419.14 |
| Total valid votes/expense limit | | 58,769 | 99.73 | – | $264,066.87 |
| Total rejected ballots | | 160 | 0.27 | – | |
| Turnout | | 58,929 | 72.09 | – | |
| Eligible voters | | 81,746 | | | |
| Conservative notional hold | | Swing | | –4.70 | |
This riding was created from parts of Crowfoot and Vegreville—Wainwright, both of which elected Conservative candidates in the 2011 election. Kevin Sorenson was the incumbent from Crowfoot. Changes are based on redistributed results.
Source: Elections Canada

2011 federal election redistributed results
| Party | Vote | % |
|---|---|---|
| Conservative | 39,646 | 83.09 |
| New Democratic | 4,694 | 9.84 |
| Green | 1,859 | 3.90 |
| Liberal | 1,027 | 2.15 |
| Others | 486 | 1.02 |

2021 Canadian federal election
| Party | Candidate | Votes | % |
|---|---|---|---|
| Conservative | Damien Kurek | 2,447 | 50.70 |
| New Democratic | Tonya Ratushniak | 756 | 15.67 |
| People's | Dennis Trepanier | 444 | 9.20 |
| Green | Daniel Brisbin | 399 | 8.27 |
| Liberal | Lean Diane McLeod | 354 | 7.34 |
| Maverick | Jeff Golka | 290 | 6.01 |
| Veterans Coalition | John Irwin | 136 | 2.82 |
| Total votes | | 4,826 | 100 |
Source: Student Vote Canada

2019 Canadian federal election
| Party | Candidate | Votes | % |
|---|---|---|---|
| Conservative | Damien Kurek | 3,681 | 67.48 |
| New Democratic | Natashan Fryzuk | 604 | 11.07 |
| Green | Geordie Nelson | 401 | 7.35 |
| Liberal | Dianne Clarke | 401 | 7.35 |
| People's | David A. Michaud | 368 | 6.75 |
| Total votes | | 5,455 | 100 |
Source: Student Vote Canada

== Student Vote results ==
2025 Canadian federal election
| Party | Candidate | Votes | % |
|---|---|---|---|
| Conservative | Damien Kurek | 2,830 | 67.59 |
| Liberal | Brent Sutton | 461 | 11.01 |
| New Democratic | James MacKay | 336 | 8.02 |
| Green | Douglas Gook | 381 | 7.59 |
| People's | Jonathan Bridges | 242 | 5.78 |
| Total votes | | 4,187 | 100 |
Source: Student Vote Canada

== Towns / villages / cities in Battle River—Crowfoot ==
- Acadia Valley
- Acme
- Alliance
- Amisk
- Bashaw
- Bawlf
- Big Valley
- Bittern Lake
- Botha
- Camrose
- Castor
- Cereal
- Chauvin
- Consort
- Coronation
- Czar
- Daysland
- Delia
- Drumheller
- Edberg
- Edgerton
- Empress
- Ferintosh
- Forestburg
- Gadsby
- Galahad
- Halkirk
- Hanna
- Hardisty
- Hay Lakes
- Heisler
- Holden
- Hughenden
- Irma
- Killam
- Lougheed
- Morrin
- Munson
- New Norway
- Oyen
- Provost
- Rosalind
- Round Hill
- Rumsey
- Ryley
- Sedgewick
- Stettler
- Strome
- Three Hills
- Tofield
- Trochu
- Veteran
- Viking
- Wainwright
- Youngstown

== See also ==
- List of Canadian electoral districts
- Historical federal electoral districts of Canada

== Notes ==
Parliament of Canada
| Preceded by Regina—Qu'Appelle | Constituency represented by the leader of the Opposition; 2025–present | Incumbent |
