= Alberta Highway 13 =

Highway in Alberta

Highway 13

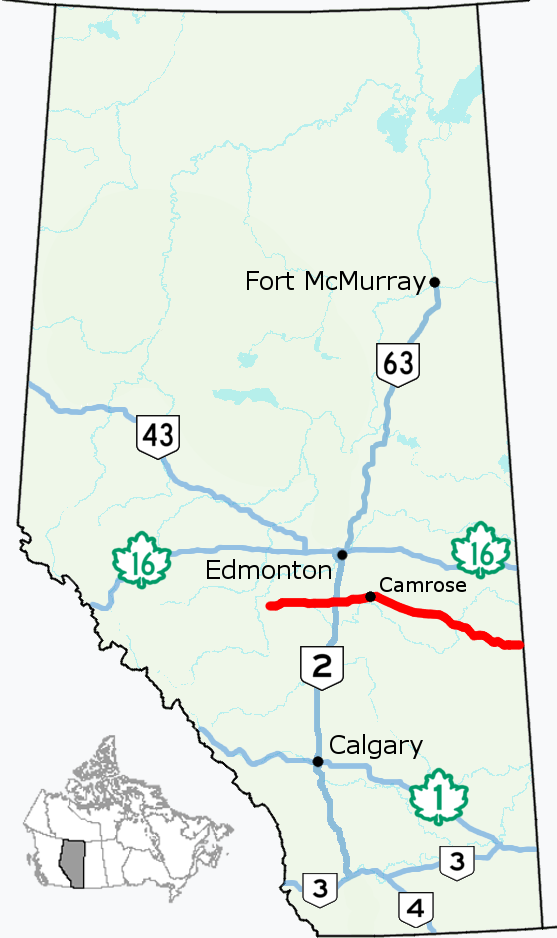
- Highway 13 highlighted in red

Route information
- Maintained by Alberta Transportation, the City of Wetaskiwin, and the City of Camrose
- Length: 366.0 km (227.4 mi)

Major junctions
- West end: Range Road 74 near Alder Flats
- Highway 22 near Alder Flats; Highway 20 near Winfield; Highway 2 near Wetaskiwin; Highway 2A in Wetaskiwin; Highway 21 near Camrose; Highway 26 in Camrose; Highway 56 near Camrose; Highway 36 in Killam; Highway 41 near Czar
- East end: Highway 14 near Hayter at the Saskatchewan border

Location
- Country: Canada
- Province: Alberta
- Specialized and rural municipalities: Wetaskiwin No. 10 County, Camrose County, Flagstaff County, Provost No. 52 M.D.
- Major cities: Wetaskiwin, Camrose
- Towns: Daysland, Killam, Sedgewick, Hardisty, Provost
- Villages: Bittern Lake, Bawlf, Lougheed, Amisk, Hughenden

Highway system
- Alberta Numbered Highway Network; List; Former
← Highway 12	→ Highway 14

Highway 13 is an east–west highway through central Alberta. It runs from Alder Flats, 7 km (4 mi) west of Highway 22, to the Alberta-Saskatchewan border, where it becomes Saskatchewan Highway 14. Highway 13 is about 366 kilometres (227 mi) long. East of the City of Wetaskiwin, it generally parallels the Canadian Pacific Kansas City Prairie North Line.

== Route description ==
From the west, Highway 13 begins at Alder Flats before intersecting Highway 22. It continues east, passing south of Buck Lake and Winfield before crossing Highway 20. The highway then passes south of Battle Lake, the headwaters of the Battle River, before crossing the river between Highway 20 and Westerose. The Battle River drains approximately 30,000 km² of central Alberta and Saskatchewan and is the largest tributary of the North Saskatchewan River; it was named after battles between Cree and Blackfoot peoples along its banks. The highway continues south of Pigeon Lake, passing through the hamlets of Westerose and Falun prior to intersecting Highway 2 (Queen Elizabeth II Highway), approximately 51 km (32 mi) south of Edmonton.

East of Highway 2, Highway 13 enters Wetaskiwin as 40 Avenue and turns north along Highway 2A (56 Street). At the north side of Wetaskiwin, it turns east and passes north of Gwynne through Bittern Lake. After crossing Highway 21, it enters Camrose as 48 Avenue.

East of Camrose, Highway 13 travels generally southeast, passing by Ohaton, Bawlf, Daysland and Strome prior to an intersection with Highway 36 (Veterans Memorial Highway) in Killam. The highway continues southeast passing by Sedgewick, Lougheed, and Hardisty. East of Hardisty, it crosses the Battle River a second time. Hardisty is home to a major crude oil terminal that can store up to 16 million barrels and handles approximately 3.5 million barrels per day, served by several major pipelines including the Enbridge Mainline and the Athabasca Pipeline. The highway continues past Amisk and Hughenden, crossing Highway 41 north of Czar. The road travels by Metiskow, through Provost, and by Hayter. Upon entering Saskatchewan, Highway 13 continues as Saskatchewan Highway 14 to Saskatoon.

== History ==
The section of Highway 13 from Wetaskiwin to Winfield was originally designated as Highway 19, but was renumbered in the late 1960s. Highway 13 was extended further west to Alder Flats in c. 1979 when Highway 612 was renumbered, coinciding with the commissioning of Highway 22 north of Cremona.

== Major intersections ==
From west to east:

Rural/specialized municipality	Location	km	mi	Destinations	Notes
County of Wetaskiwin No. 10	Alder Flats	0.0	0.0	Range Road 74 / Township Road 460	Western terminus
County of Wetaskiwin No. 10		6.5	4.0	Highway 22 – Drayton Valley, Rocky Mountain House	
County of Wetaskiwin No. 10		11.3	7.0	Range Road 63 – Buck Lake	
County of Wetaskiwin No. 10		20.6	12.8	Highway 761 north	
County of Wetaskiwin No. 10	Winfield	39.1	24.3	UAR 175 north	
County of Wetaskiwin No. 10		39.9	24.8	Highway 20 – Breton, Rimbey	
County of Wetaskiwin No. 10		59.3	36.8	Crosses Battle River	
County of Wetaskiwin No. 10		63.7	39.6	Highway 771 – Pigeon Lake Provincial Park	
County of Wetaskiwin No. 10	Village at Pigeon Lake	66.9	41.6	Range Road 11 – Norris Beach	
County of Wetaskiwin No. 10	Westerose	69.7	43.3	Highway 13A east – Ma-Me-O Beach	
County of Wetaskiwin No. 10		74.6	46.4	Highway 13A west – Ma-Me-O Beach	
County of Wetaskiwin No. 10	Falun	82.0	51.0	Highway 795 – Calmar	
County of Wetaskiwin No. 10		92.3	57.4	Highway 2 – Edmonton, Red Deer, Calgary	Interchange; Highway 2 exit 295
City of Wetaskiwin		109.5	68.0	56 Street (Highway 2A south) – Ponoka 40 Avenue (Highway 613 east)	West end of Highway 2A concurrency; former Highway 13A east
City of Wetaskiwin		112.7	70.0	Highway 2A north – Leduc, Edmonton	East end of Highway 2A concurrency
City of Wetaskiwin		114.3	71.0	Highway 814 north / 47 Street – Beaumont	Former Highway 13A west; passes Wetaskiwin Hospital
County of Wetaskiwin No. 10		124.9	77.6	Highway 822	
County of Wetaskiwin No. 10	Gwynne	126.0	78.3	UAR 189 south	
Camrose County	Bittern Lake	136.0	84.5		
Camrose County	Ervick	143.4	89.1	Highway 21 – Edmonton, Three Hills	Roundabout
City of Camrose		149.8	93.1	68 Street (Highway 13A east) – Thru Traffic	Bypass route
City of Camrose		151.8	94.3	51 Street (Highway 833 north)	
City of Camrose		153.7	95.5	Highway 26 east – Viking	
City of Camrose		155.9	96.9	Highway 13A west (Camrose Drive) – Thru Traffic	Bypass route
Camrose County		160.8	99.9	Highway 56 – Tofield, Stettler	Roundabout; former Highway 834 north
Camrose County	Ohaton	164.4	102.2	Range Road 192 – Round Hill	
Camrose County	Bawlf	180.3	112.0	Highway 854 – Ryley, Rosalind	
Flagstaff County	Daysland	194.5	120.9	Highway 855 north – Holden	West end of Highway 855 concurrency
Flagstaff County		196.2	121.9	Highway 855 south – Heisler, Forestburg	East end of Highway 855 concurrency
Flagstaff County	Strome	209.0	129.9	Highway 856 south – Forestburg	
Flagstaff County	Killam	223.7	139.0	Highway 36 – Viking, Castor	
Flagstaff County	Sedgewick	234.3	145.6	Highway 869 north	
Flagstaff County	Lougheed	246.5	153.2	Highway 870 north – Kinsella	
Flagstaff County		257.7	160.1	Highway 872 south – Coronation	
Flagstaff County	Hardisty	263.6	163.8	Highway 881 north – Irma	
Flagstaff County		265.6	165.0	Crosses Battle River	
M.D. of Provost No. 52	Amisk	284.4	176.7	Highway 884 south – Veteran	
M.D. of Provost No. 52	Hughenden	294.1	182.7	Highway 603 west / UAR 86 east	
M.D. of Provost No. 52		305.1	189.6	Highway 41 – Czar, Consort, Wainwright	
M.D. of Provost No. 52		320.4	199.1	UAR 87 south – Metiskow	
M.D. of Provost No. 52		332.9	206.9	Range Road 41 – Cadogan	Former UAR 108 south
M.D. of Provost No. 52	Provost	348.0	216.2	Highway 899 north – Ribstone; Highway 600 west – Cadogan	West end of Highway 899 concurrency
M.D. of Provost No. 52	Provost	349.6	217.2	Highway 899 south – Bodo	East end of Highway 899 concurrency
M.D. of Provost No. 52	Hayter	358.6	222.8		
M.D. of Provost No. 52		366.0	227.4	Highway 14 east – Macklin, Saskatoon	Continuation into Saskatchewan
1.000 mi = 1.609 km; 1.000 km = 0.621 mi: Concurrency terminus; Route transition

== Highway 13A ==
Alberta Provincial Highway No. 13A is the designation of the following two current and one former alternate routes of Highway 13.

Ma-Me-O Beach

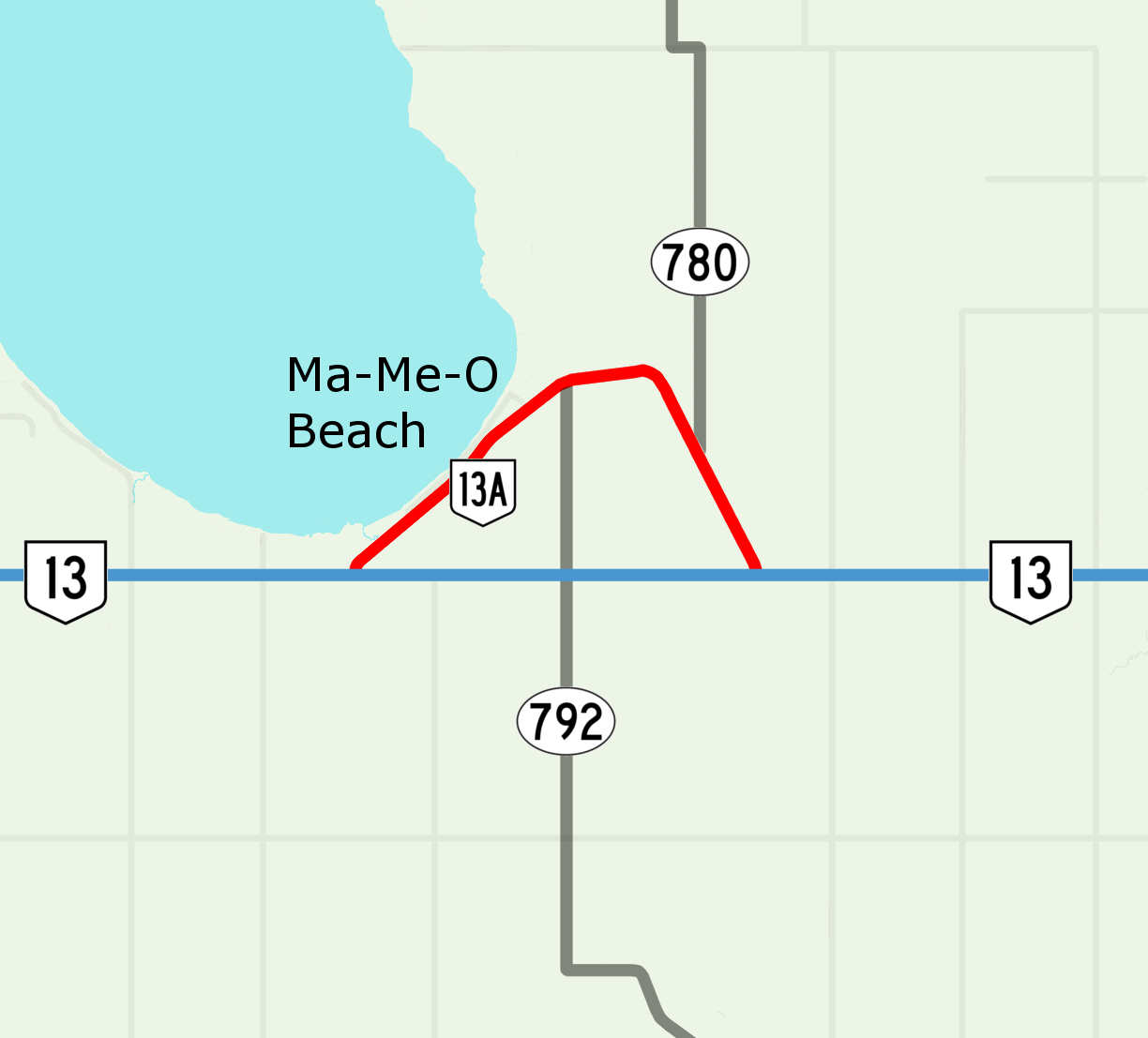
Highway 13A in Ma-Me-O Beach

Highway 13A
- Location: Ma-Me-O Beach
- Length: 7.4 km (4.6 mi)

From 2.0 km (1.2 mi) east of Westerose to 5.6 km (3.5 mi) west of Falun, the first segment of Highway 13A travels 7.4 km (4.6 mi) through Pigeon Lake Indian Reserve 138A. It provides access to the Summer Village of Ma-Me-O Beach on the southern shore of Pigeon Lake. This segment, which runs north of Highway 13, formed the original Highway 13 alignment prior to it being realigned to bypass the Indian reserve and summer village to the south in the 2000s.

Pigeon Lake covers 96.7 square kilometres (37.3 sq mi) and has a maximum depth of 9.1 m. Pigeon Lake Indian Reserve 138A was established in 1896 on the southeast shore of the lake for members of the Ermineskin, Louis Bull, Samson, and Montana bands, providing access to fishing and trapping. In 1923, 180 acres were removed from the reserve and subdivided for public sale to form Ma-Me-O Beach, whose name derives from the Cree wapiski-mimew, meaning "white pigeon." The community was incorporated as a summer village in 1948.

Camrose

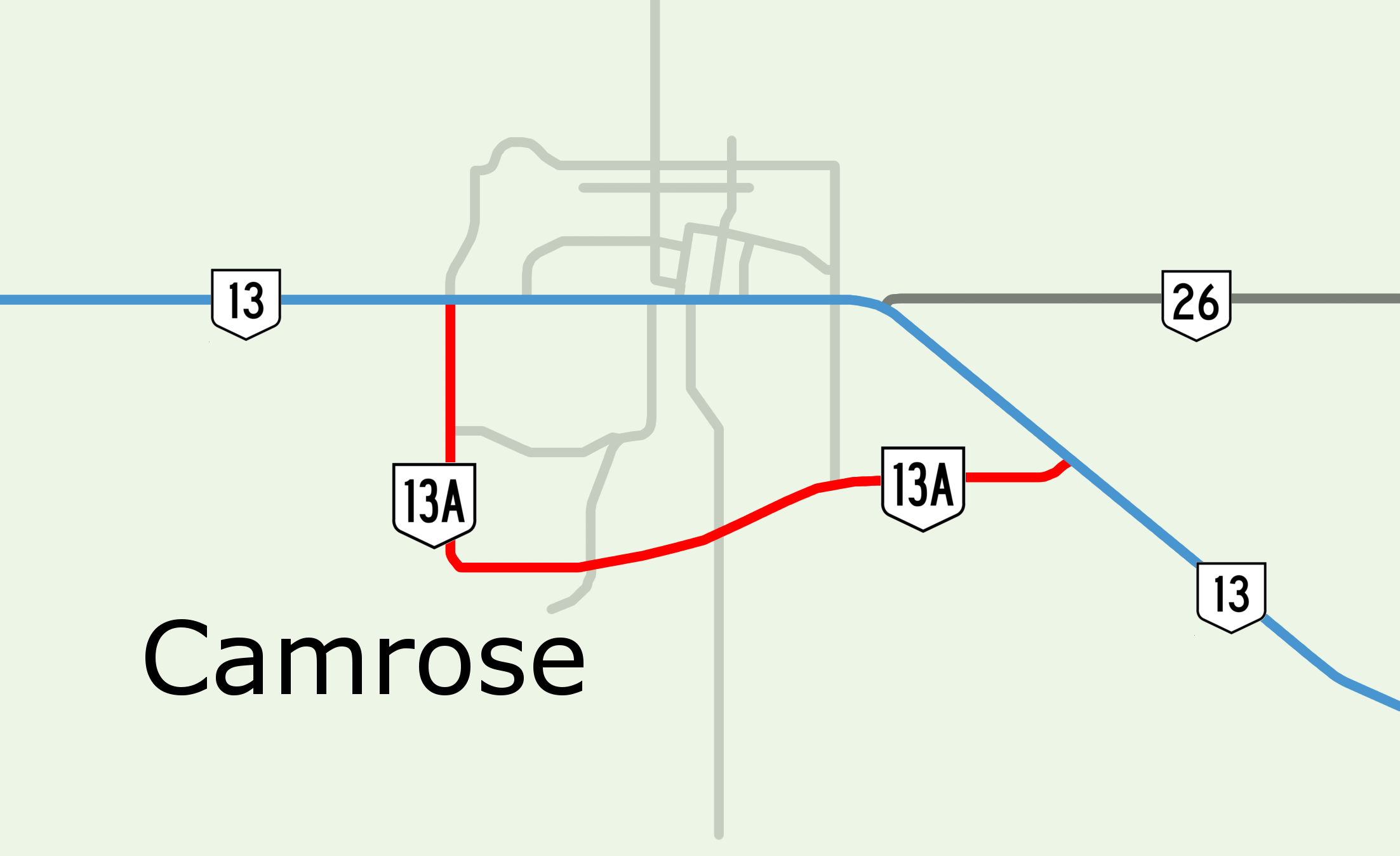
Highway 13A in Camrose

Highway 13A (68 Street, Camrose Drive)
- Location: Camrose
- Length: 8.2 km (5.1 mi)

The second segment of Highway 13A is a southern bypass of Camrose and is 8 km (5.0 mi) in length. Commissioned in 1989, the route follows 68 Street south from Highway 13 (48 Avenue) for 2.4 km (1.5 mi) and then turns east and becoming Camrose Drive, reconnecting with Highway 13 on the eastern ends of Camrose. Highway 13A serves as the main dangerous goods route through Camrose, as dangerous good are prohibited on Highway 13 (48 Avenue) through the centre of the city, and is maintained by the City of Camrose.

Wetaskiwin

Highway 13A is a former alternate route of Highway 13 through Wetaskiwin. From the present Highway 13 (west) / Highway 2A intersection, Highway 13A used to proceed east along 40 Avenue for 1.6 km (0.99 mi), then turned north and followed 47 Street for 3.2 km (2.0 mi) and reconnected with Highway 13 at the present-day Highway 13 / Highway 814 intersection. The route was decommissioned in mid-1980s.

== Construction and improvements ==
Alberta Transportation's 2023 and 2024 provincial construction programs included several projects on Highway 13. A widening project for the highway was in planning and engineering as of 2024. A roundabout at the intersection of Highway 13 and Highway 56, east of Camrose, was in design in both years.

Several sections were identified for repaving. A 20 km section between 1 km east of Highway 761 and Highway 20 was in design in 2023 and moved to construction in 2024. Additional segments in design included 16 km between 2 km east of Highway 814 and 2 km west of Bittern Lake, 2 km between Highway 2A and Highway 814 in Wetaskiwin, and 16 km between Highway 899 and 16 km east of Provost. A replacement cattlepass 4 km west of Camrose was also in design as of 2023.
