= Metiskow =

- Hamlet
- Location of Metiskow Metiskow (Canada)
- Coordinates: 52°24′31″N 110°38′00″W
- Country: Canada
- Province: Alberta
- Region: Central Alberta
- Census division: 7
- Municipal district: Municipal District of Provost No. 52

Government
  - Type: Unincorporated
  - Governing body: Municipal District of Provost No. 52 Council

Population (1991)
  - Total: 65
- Time zone: UTC−06:00 (Alberta Time)
- Area codes: 403, 587, 825

Metiskow (/məˈtɪskoʊ/) is a hamlet in central Alberta, Canada, within the Municipal District of Provost No. 52. It is located 2 kilometres (1.2 mi) southwest of Highway 13, approximately 105 kilometres (65 mi) southwest of Lloydminster. The name is derived from metosi-skaw (Cree for 'many trees').

== Demographics ==
Population history of Metiskow
Year	Pop.	±%
1941	92	—
1951	95	+3.3%
1956	98	+3.2%
1961	99	+1.0%
1966	72	−27.3%
1971	66	−8.3%
1976	99	+50.0%
1981	85	−14.1%
1986	93	+9.4%
1991	65	−30.1%
Source: Statistics Canada

Metiskow recorded a population of 65 in the 1991 Census of Population conducted by Statistics Canada.

== See also ==
- List of communities in Alberta
- List of hamlets in Alberta
