= Hayter, Alberta =

Hayter
- Hamlet
- Location of Hayter Hayter (Canada)
- Coordinates: 52°21′23″N 110°06′28″W
- Country: Canada
- Province: Alberta
- Region: Central Alberta
- Census division: 7
- Municipal district: Municipal District of Provost No. 52

Government
  - Type: Unincorporated
  - Governing body: Municipal District of Provost No. 52 Council

Area (2021)
  - Land: 0.7 km^{2} (0.27 sq mi)

Population (2021)
  - Total: 84
  - Density: 120.8/km^{2} (313/sq mi)
- Time zone: UTC−06:00 (Alberta Time)
- Area codes: 403, 587, 825

Hayter is a hamlet in central Alberta, Canada within the Municipal District of Provost No. 52. It is located 0.6 kilometres (0.37 mi) south of Highway 13, approximately 103 kilometres (64 mi) south of Lloydminster. It was founded in 1909 and named after the president of CP Hotels.

== Demographics ==
In the 2021 Census of Population conducted by Statistics Canada, Hayter had a population of 84 living in 41 of its 47 total private dwellings, a change of −5.6% from its 2016 population of 89. With a land area of 0.7 km^{2} (0.27 sq mi), it had a population density of 120.0/km^{2} (310.8/sq mi) in 2021.

As a designated place in the 2016 Census of Population conducted by Statistics Canada, Hayter had a population of 89 living in 36 of its 47 total private dwellings, a change of −13.6% from its 2011 population of 103. With a land area of 0.7 km^{2} (0.27 sq mi), it had a population density of 127.1/km^{2} (329.3/sq mi) in 2016.

== See also ==
- List of communities in Alberta
- List of designated places in Alberta
- List of hamlets in Alberta
