= Hughenden =

Hughenden may refer to:

- Hughenden, Queensland, a town in Australia
- Hughenden, Alberta, a village in central Alberta, Canada
- Hughenden Valley, a village in Buckinghamshire, England
- Hughenden Manor, a mansion in High Wycombe, Buckinghamshire, England, home of Benjamin Disraeli
- Hughenden, Glasgow, a rugby stadium in Glasgow and former home of the Glasgow Warriors
