= Alder Flats =

- Hamlet
- Nickname: the Gem of Alberta
- Location of Alder Flats Alder Flats (Canada)
- Coordinates: 52°55′59″N 114°57′25″W
- Country: Canada
- Province: Alberta
- Region: Central Alberta
- Census division: 11
- Municipal district: County of Wetaskiwin No. 10

Government
  - Type: Unincorporated
  - Governing body: County of Wetaskiwin No. 10 Council

Area (2021)
  - Land: 1.85 km^{2} (0.71 sq mi)

Population (2021)
  - Total: 137
  - Density: 74.2/km^{2} (192/sq mi)
- Time zone: UTC−06:00 (Alberta Time)
- Area codes: 780, 587, 825

Alder Flats is a hamlet in central Alberta, Canada within the County of Wetaskiwin No. 10. It is located 8 kilometres (5.0 mi) west of Highway 22 at the western terminus of Highway 13, approximately 120 kilometres (75 mi) southwest of Edmonton.

== Demographics ==
Population history of Alder Flats
Year	Pop.	±%
1951	62	—
1956	369	+495.2%
1961	121	−67.2%
1966	118	−2.5%
1971	133	+12.7%
1976	94	−29.3%
1981	106	+12.8%
1986	111	+4.7%
1991	115	+3.6%
1991A	116	+0.9%
1996	139	+19.8%
2001	133	−4.3%
2006	148	+11.3%
2011	152	+2.7%
2016	167	+9.9%
2021	137	−18.0%
Source: Statistics Canada

In the 2021 Census of Population conducted by Statistics Canada, Alder Flats had a population of 137 living in 58 of its 69 total private dwellings, a change of −18% from its 2016 population of 167. With a land area of 1.85 km^{2} (0.71 sq mi), it had a population density of 74.1/km^{2} (191.8/sq mi) in 2021.

As a designated place in the 2016 Census of Population conducted by Statistics Canada, Alder Flats had a population of 167 living in 60 of its 70 total private dwellings, a change of 9.9% from its 2011 population of 152. With a land area of 1.85 km^{2} (0.71 sq mi), it had a population density of 90.3/km^{2} (233.8/sq mi) in 2016.

== See also ==
- List of communities in Alberta
- List of designated places in Alberta
- List of hamlets in Alberta
