= Killam, Alberta =

Killam
- Town
- Town of Killam
- Wide shot of Killam, Alberta
- Motto: Life without compromise
- Location within Alberta
- Coordinates: 52°47′26″N 111°51′20″W
- Country: Canada
- Province: Alberta
- Region: Central Alberta
- Census division: 7
- Municipal district: Flagstaff County
- Incorporated
  - Village: December 29, 1906
  - Town: May 1, 1965

Government
  - Mayor: Richard Krys
  - Governing body: Killam Town Council

Area (2021)
  - Land: 6.4 km^{2} (2.5 sq mi)
- Elevation: 680 m (2,230 ft)

Population (2021)
  - Total: 918
  - Density: 143.5/km^{2} (372/sq mi)
- Time zone: UTC−06:00 (Alberta Time)
- Area code: -1+780
- Highways: Highway 13; Highway 36
- Waterways: Wavy Lake; Iron Creek
- Website: Official website

Killam is a town in central Alberta, Canada in Flagstaff County, east of Camrose at the junction of Highway 13 and Veterans Memorial Highway, Highway 36.

== Demographics ==
In the 2021 Census of Population conducted by Statistics Canada, the Town of Killam had a population of 918 living in 398 of its 442 total private dwellings, a change of −7.2% from its 2016 population of 989. With a land area of 6.4 km^{2} (2.5 sq mi), it had a population density of 143.4/km^{2} (371.5/sq mi) in 2021.

In the 2016 Census of Population conducted by Statistics Canada, the Town of Killam recorded a population of 989 living in 380 of its 415 total private dwellings, a 0.8% change from its 2011 population of 981. With a land area of 6.75 km^{2} (2.61 sq mi), it had a population density of 146.5/km^{2} (379.5/sq mi) in 2016.

== Government ==
As of 2025 the mayor was Lester Fee.

== Notable people ==
- Kevin Martin, curling Olympic gold medalist
- Damien Kurek, Canadian Member of Parliament
- Bill Peters, NHL coach

== See also ==
- List of communities in Alberta
- List of towns in Alberta
