= Gwynne, Alberta =

Gwynne: Rodberg's Crossing, Rodberg's Flat (1902); Diana (1902-1905)
- Hamlet
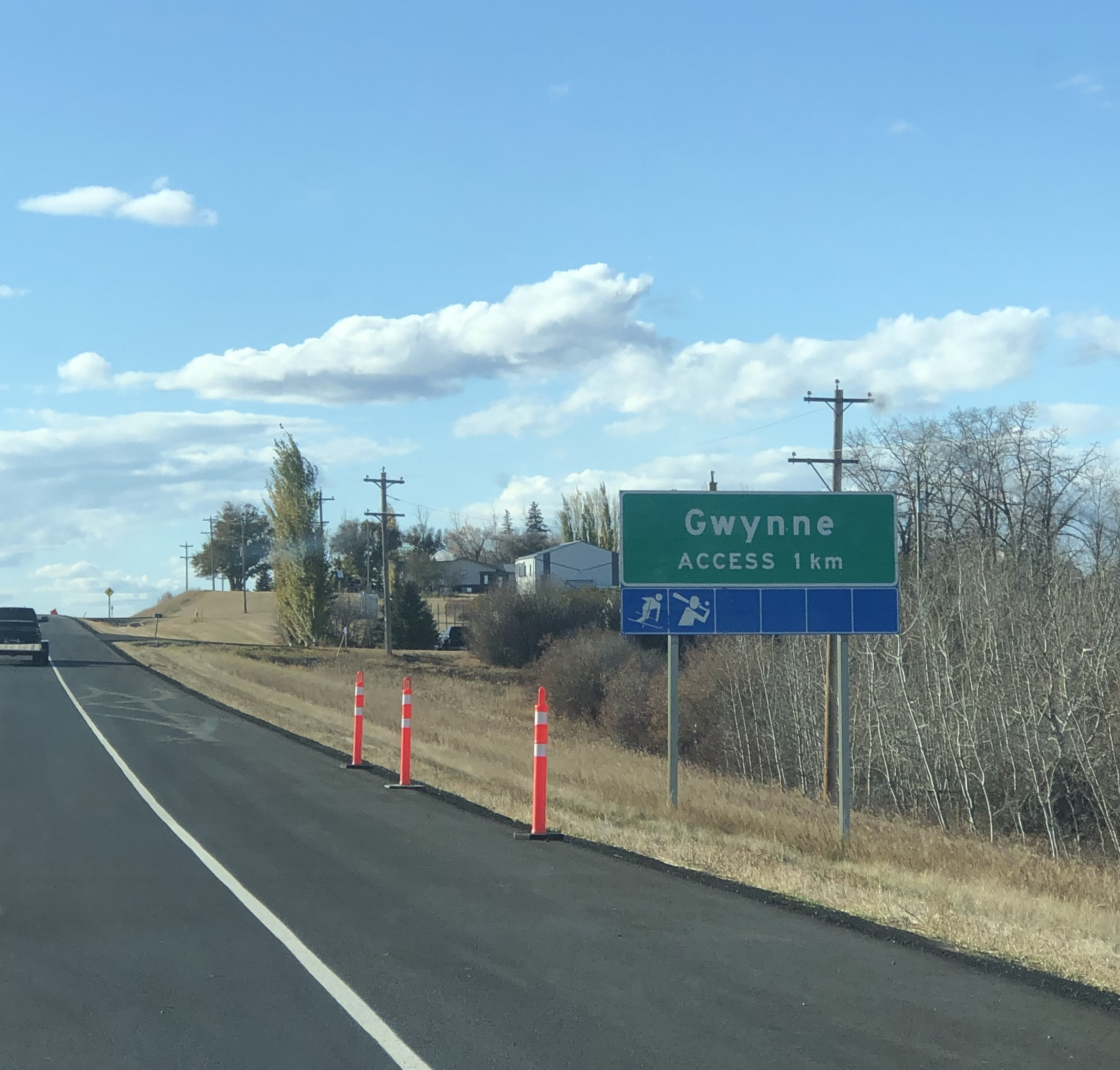

- Location within County of Wetaskiwin Location within Alberta
- Coordinates: 52°59′12″N 113°11′56″W
- Country: Canada
- Province: Alberta
- Region: Central Alberta
- Census division: No. 11
- Municipal district: County of Wetaskiwin No. 10
- Settled: 1902
- Named for: Julia Maude Schreiber (née Gwynne)

Area (2021)
  - Land: 0.5 km^{2} (0.19 sq mi)

Population (2021)
  - Total: 93
  - Density: 185.4/km^{2} (480/sq mi)
- Time zone: UTC−06:00 (Alberta Time)
- Postal code: T0C 1L0
- Area codes: 780
- Highways: Highway 13

Gwynne is a hamlet in central Alberta, Canada within the County of Wetaskiwin No. 10. It is located on Highway 13, approximately 11 kilometres (6.8 mi) east of Wetaskiwin.

== History ==
In 1902, pioneer homesteader Charles Rodberg (known in his native Belgium as Chevalier Charles Rodberg de Walden) opened a store and post office along the railway and the area was known as Rodberg's Crossing, or Rodberg's Flat. Later the area was known as Diana, after his eldest child, and the Post Office was called the Diana Post Office. When the CPR arrived in 1905 the community was renamed to honor the wife of a railway official. Julia Maude Schreiber (née Gwynne) was the second wife of Sir Collingwood Schreiber (1831-1908), a railway builder, former chief engineer of the CPR and former federal deputy minister of railways and canals. Julia was president of the Ottawa Ladies' golf club and vice-regent of the Daughters of the Empire in Ottawa. It is doubtful that she ever set foot in the hamlet named after her.

== Climate ==
The Köppen Climate Classification subtype for this climate is "Dfb" (Warm Summer Continental Climate).

Climate data for Gwynne, Alberta
Month	Jan	Feb	Mar	Apr	May	Jun	Jul	Aug	Sep	Oct	Nov	Dec	Year
Record high °C (°F)	9.0 (48.2)	14.0 (57.2)	25.0 (77.0)	28.5 (83.3)	31.1 (88.0)	33.0 (91.4)	34.5 (94.1)	35.0 (95.0)	34.0 (93.2)	29.5 (85.1)	21.7 (71.1)	18.0 (64.4)	35.0 (95.0)
Mean daily maximum °C (°F)	−6.6 (20.1)	−3.2 (26.2)	1.9 (35.4)	11.2 (52.2)	17.5 (63.5)	21.0 (69.8)	23.2 (73.8)	22.9 (73.2)	17.6 (63.7)	10.7 (51.3)	0.2 (32.4)	−4.8 (23.4)	9.3 (48.7)
Daily mean °C (°F)	−12.4 (9.7)	−9.5 (14.9)	−4 (25)	4.3 (39.7)	10.3 (50.5)	14.2 (57.6)	16.3 (61.3)	15.3 (59.5)	10.3 (50.5)	3.9 (39.0)	−5.2 (22.6)	−10.4 (13.3)	2.4 (36.3)
Mean daily minimum °C (°F)	−18 (0)	−15.8 (3.6)	−9.9 (14.2)	−2.6 (27.3)	3.0 (37.4)	7.4 (45.3)	9.4 (48.9)	8.2 (46.8)	3.0 (37.4)	−2.9 (26.8)	−10.5 (13.1)	−16 (3)	−3.7 (25.3)
Record low °C (°F)	−46.0 (−50.8)	−43.5 (−46.3)	−39 (−38)	−29.5 (−21.1)	−8.0 (17.6)	−2.5 (27.5)	−0.6 (30.9)	−3.0 (26.6)	−9.5 (14.9)	−26.0 (−14.8)	−34.5 (−30.1)	−46.1 (−51.0)	−46.1 (−51.0)
Average precipitation mm (inches)	22.5 (0.89)	14.0 (0.55)	21.6 (0.85)	29.8 (1.17)	52.9 (2.08)	76.3 (3.00)	101.9 (4.01)	60.1 (2.37)	44.2 (1.74)	21.5 (0.85)	17.1 (0.67)	14.6 (0.57)	476.6 (18.76)
Average rainfall mm (inches)	1.5 (0.06)	0.7 (0.03)	1.7 (0.07)	19.5 (0.77)	49.0 (1.93)	76.3 (3.00)	101.9 (4.01)	60.1 (2.37)	43.2 (1.70)	12.5 (0.49)	2.4 (0.09)	0.9 (0.04)	369.8 (14.56)
Average snowfall cm (inches)	21.0 (8.3)	13.0 (5.1)	20.0 (7.9)	10.0 (3.9)	4.0 (1.6)	0.0 (0.0)	0.0 (0.0)	0.0 (0.0)	1.0 (0.4)	9.0 (3.5)	15.0 (5.9)	14.0 (5.5)	107.0 (42.1)
Source: Environment Canada

== Demographics ==
Population history of Gwynne
Year	Pop.	±%
1941	77	—
1951	65	−15.6%
1956	86	+32.3%
1961	109	+26.7%
1966	75	−31.2%
1971	70	−6.7%
1976	67	−4.3%
1981	97	+44.8%
1986	118	+21.6%
1991	124	+5.1%
1996	127	+2.4%
2001	130	+2.4%
2006	97	−25.4%
2011	88	−9.3%
2016	73	−17.0%
2021	93	+27.4%
Source: Statistics Canada

In the 2021 Census of Population conducted by Statistics Canada, Gwynne had a population of 93 living in 41 of its 42 total private dwellings, a change of 27.4% from its 2016 population of 73. With a land area of 0.5 km^{2} (0.19 sq mi), it had a population density of 186.0/km^{2} (481.7/sq mi) in 2021.

As a designated place in the 2016 Census of Population conducted by Statistics Canada, Gwynne had a population of 73 living in 31 of its 32 total private dwellings, a change of −17% from its 2011 population of 88. With a land area of 0.52 km^{2} (0.20 sq mi), it had a population density of 140.4/km^{2} (363.6/sq mi) in 2016.

== See also ==
- List of communities in Alberta
- List of designated places in Alberta
- List of hamlets in Alberta
