= Cadogan, Alberta =

Cadogan
- Hamlet
- Location of Cadogan Cadogan (Canada)
- Coordinates: 52°19′09″N 110°26′55″W
- Country: Canada
- Province: Alberta
- Region: Central Alberta
- Census division: 7
- Municipal district: Municipal District of Provost No. 52

Government
  - Type: Unincorporated
  - Governing body: Municipal District of Provost No. 52 Council

Area (2021)
  - Land: 0.64 km^{2} (0.25 sq mi)

Population (2021)
  - Total: 108
  - Density: 168.1/km^{2} (435/sq mi)
- Time zone: UTC−06:00 (Alberta Time)
- Area codes: 403, 587, 825

Cadogan is a hamlet in central Alberta, Canada within the Municipal District of Provost No. 52. Previously an incorporated municipality, Cadogan dissolved from village status on January 1, 1946 to become part of the Municipal District of Hillcrest No. 362.

Cadogan is located 9 kilometres (5.6 mi) south of Highway 13, approximately 110 kilometres (68 mi) southwest of Lloydminster.

== Demographics ==
Population history of Cadogan
Year	Pop.	±%
1901		—
1906		—
1911		—
1916		—
1921	106	—
1926	116	+9.4%
1931	128	+10.3%
1936	84	−34.4%
1941	99	+17.9%
1946		—
1951		—
1956		—
1961		—
1966		—
1971		—
1976		—
1981		—
1986		—
1991		—
1996		—
2001		—
2006		—
2011	112	—
2016	113	+0.9%
2021	108	−4.4%
Source: Statistics Canada

In the 2021 Census of Population conducted by Statistics Canada, Cadogan had a population of 108 living in 47 of its 54 total private dwellings, a change of −4.4% from its 2016 population of 113. With a land area of 0.64 km^{2} (0.25 sq mi), it had a population density of 168.8/km^{2} (437.1/sq mi) in 2021.

As a designated place in the 2016 Census of Population conducted by Statistics Canada, Cadogan had a population of 113 living in 47 of its 53 total private dwellings, a change of 0.9% from its 2011 population of 112. With a land area of 0.64 km^{2} (0.25 sq mi), it had a population density of 176.6/km^{2} (457.3/sq mi) in 2016.

== See also ==
- List of communities in Alberta
- List of designated places in Alberta
- List of former urban municipalities in Alberta
- List of hamlets in Alberta
