= Provost, Alberta =

Provost
- Town
- Town of Provost
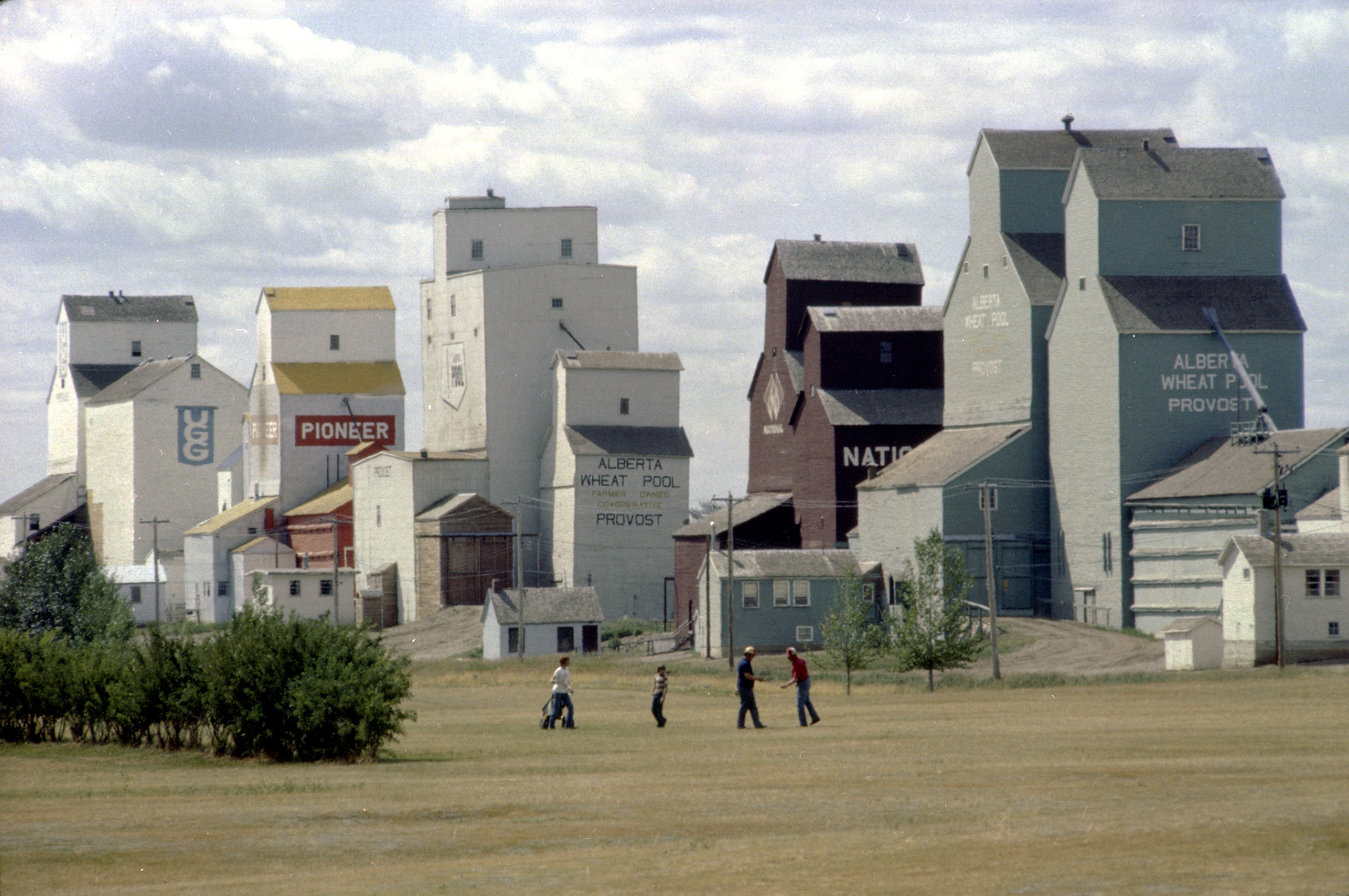
- Grain elevators, circa 1980

- Location of Provost in Alberta
- Coordinates: 52°21′14″N 110°16′07″W
- Country: Canada
- Province: Alberta
- Region: Central Alberta
- Census division: 7
- Municipal district: Municipal District of Provost No. 52
- Incorporated
  - Village: January 20, 1910
  - Town: December 29, 1952

Government
  - Mayor: Peggy McFadden
  - Governing body: Provost Town Council

Area (2021)
  - Land: 4.75 km^{2} (1.83 sq mi)
- Elevation: 668 m (2,192 ft)

Population (2021)
  - Total: 1,900
  - Density: 400.1/km^{2} (1,036/sq mi)
- Time zone: UTC−06:00 (Alberta Time)
- Postal code: T0B 3S0
- Area codes: +1-780, +1-587
- Highways: Highway 13; Highway 899
- Waterway: Gillespie Lake
- Website: Official website

Provost (/ˈproʊvoʊst/) is a town in central Alberta, Canada. It is located at the junction of Highway 13 and Highway 899, 19 km (12 mi) west of the Alberta-Saskatchewan border.

== History ==
The town was originally named "Lakeview" but renamed by the Canadian Pacific Railway Land Department in 1907; the first train to the town was in 1910. Post office established in 1908, and in the same year the original Methodist Church was built, followed by the Anglican Church. Another Church, the largest rural neo-gothic church in Alberta, would be built in 1922.

A white supremacist event, called an “Aryan Fest” by the Church of Jesus Christ Christian-Aryan Nations, took place at a farm nearby, on September 8 and 9, 1990. The event was a national scandal due to its brutality and made the headlines and made into court with the "Kane v. Church of Jesus Christ Christian-Aryan Nations (No. 3) (1992), 18 CHRR D/268" legal initiative.

== Demographics ==
In the 2021 Census of Population conducted by Statistics Canada, the Town of Provost had a population of 1,900 living in 764 of its 862 total private dwellings, a change of −4.9% from its 2016 population of 1,998. With a land area of 4.75 km^{2} (1.83 sq mi), it had a population density of 400.0/km^{2} (1,036.0/sq mi) in 2021.

In the 2016 Census of Population conducted by Statistics Canada, the Town of Provost recorded a population of 1,998 living in 779 of its 843 total private dwellings, a −2.1% change from its 2011 population of 2,041. With a land area of 4.72 km^{2} (1.82 sq mi), it had a population density of 423.3/km^{2} (1,096.4/sq mi) in 2016.

== Economy ==
The economic bases of Provost are agriculture and oilfield.

== Education ==
There are two schools in Provost: Provost Public and St. Thomas Aquinas. Provost Public School has a student population of about 400 and is part of the Buffalo Trail Regional Division No. 28. St. Thomas Aquinas School has approximately 246 students and is part of the East Central Alberta Catholic Schools Regional Division No. 16.

== Media ==
The local newspaper that covers the town is The Provost News. The East Central Alberta Review also regularly covers the town and its surrounding areas.

== Notable people ==
- Mary Borgstrom, potter and artist.
- Lance Bouma, professional hockey player.
- Curtis Glencross, professional hockey player.
- Don C. Laubman, commander Canadian Forces Europe.
- Norm Ullman, former professional hockey player.

== See also ==
- List of communities in Alberta
- List of towns in Alberta
