= Strome, Alberta =

Strome
- Hamlet
- Hamlet of Strome
- Location of Strome in Alberta
- Coordinates: 52°48′28″N 112°03′36″W
- Country: Canada
- Province: Alberta
- Region: Central Alberta
- Census Division: No. 7
- Municipal district: Flagstaff County
- Settled: 1905
- Incorporated (village): February 3, 1910
- Dissolved: January 1, 2016

Government
  - Governing body: Flagstaff County Council

Area (2021)
  - Land: 0.91 km^{2} (0.35 sq mi)
- Elevation: 693 m (2,274 ft)

Population (2021)
  - Total: 232
  - Density: 254.2/km^{2} (658/sq mi)
- Time zone: UTC−06:00 (Alberta Time)
- Postal code span: T0B 4H0
- Area code: +1-780
- Highways: Highway 13; Highway 856
- Website: Official website

Strome is a hamlet in central Alberta, Canada, within Flagstaff County. It is located on Highway 13, approximately 58 km (36 mi) east of Camrose and 150 km (93 mi) south-east of Edmonton.

== Toponymy ==
According to some sources, Strome was named after Stromeferry, a village in the Scottish Highlands. It may also have been named after a Swedish family who settled 23 km (14 mi) from the area by the early 20th century.

== History ==
=== Founding: 1900–1910 ===
Farmers began to settle in the district containing Strome in the early 20th century. Strome subsequently developed as a service centre for farming families.

One of its earliest services was its post office, which opened in July 1905 with the identifier Knollton. The post office was named for its first postmaster, Max Knoll. The community and its post office changed names to Strome twelve months later.

Strome's population began to grow rapidly in 1906, after the Canadian Pacific Railway (CPR) surveyed the area's suitability for inclusion along its Daysland to Hardisty line. Strome School opened in 1908, and the CPR established a station in Strome in 1909. On February 3, 1910, Strome was incorporated as a village by the Government of Alberta.

=== Development: 1911–1929 ===
By 1911, Strome contained several commercial operations, including a hotel and two lumber yards. It also received a grain mill, built by the Strome Milling and Grain Company, which was unusual for a community of Strome's size at the time.

Following the outbreak of the First World War in 1914, men from Strome and surrounding areas enlisted to fight for Canada. In honour of fifteen locals who died in action, Strome residents constructed a Memorial Hall in 1920, which also became the area's community hall and theatre. The original Memorial Hall building would be replaced in 1934, following fire damage.

=== Great Depression and the rest of the 20th century: 1930–2000 ===
Strome's Pioneer grain elevator, photographed in August 2013 shortly before demolition.

Throughout the 1930s, Alberta experienced economic setbacks due to the Great Depression; the mass drought of the Dust Bowl also stunted crop yields. Strome residents were relatively shielded from their full effects, as farms only experienced difficult years in 1933 and 1937. Nonetheless, although families were able to feed themselves, their crops commanded poor prices on the open market.

Strome received electricity in the 1950s, and paved roads connecting the village to Highway 13. The locality depopulated in the 1960s as land prices reached a new high, prompting some farmers to sell their acres; families also relocated to larger surrounding settlements. Strome's population stood at around 230 in 1976.

Passenger rail services to Strome ended by 1980, though freight services remained active. Richardson Pioneer opened a grain elevator in Strome in 1983, at a cost of $1.8 million. In 1986, the locality's community hall become home to the Sodbusters Archives Museum, dedicated to preserving the history of the Canadian prairies. Strome's population reached an estimated 265 by the end of the decade.

=== Early 21st century: 2001–2015 ===
View of Strome from intersection of 50 Ave and 50 St, November 2015.

In 2010, Flagstaff County considered closing Strome School due to declining enrolment. The plan was discontinued after parents protested.

The school remained open for another two years, until Flagstaff County suggested combining grades to improve the school's financial viability. Parents chose to move their children to other schools in October 2012, and Strome School finally closed. The building was demolished, though its baseball diamonds and playground were not.

Richardson Pioneer decided to close Strome's grain elevator in 2013, citing unsustainable costs of maintenance. It was demolished that year. Strome's last remaining grain elevator is an abandoned Alberta Wheat Pool structure.

=== Hamlet of Strome: 2016–present ===
The Village of Strome dissolved to become the Hamlet of Strome on January 1, 2016.

In 2023, the local Eshpeter family launched an annual charitable baseball tournament, Swinging for the STARS, to fundraise for the Shock Trauma Air Rescue Service. The tournament takes place on the former Strome School's baseball diamond.

In March 2026, Flagstaff County considered an offer from Battle River School Division to purchase the Strome School site. If accepted, the county would assume the site's upkeep, benefiting groups that utilize the hamlet's baseball diamonds.

== Demographics ==
In the 2021 Census of Population conducted by Statistics Canada, Strome had a population of 232 living in 112 of its 127 total private dwellings, a change of −10.8% from its 2016 population of 260. With a land area of 0.91 km^{2} (0.35 sq mi), it had a population density of 254.9/km^{2} (660.3/sq mi) in 2021.

As a designated place in the 2016 Census of Population conducted by Statistics Canada, Strome had a population of 260 living in 113 of its 123 total private dwellings, a 14% change from its 2011 population of 228. With a land area of 0.92 km^{2} (0.36 sq mi), it had a population density of 282.6/km^{2} (732.0/sq mi) in 2016.

== Places of interest ==
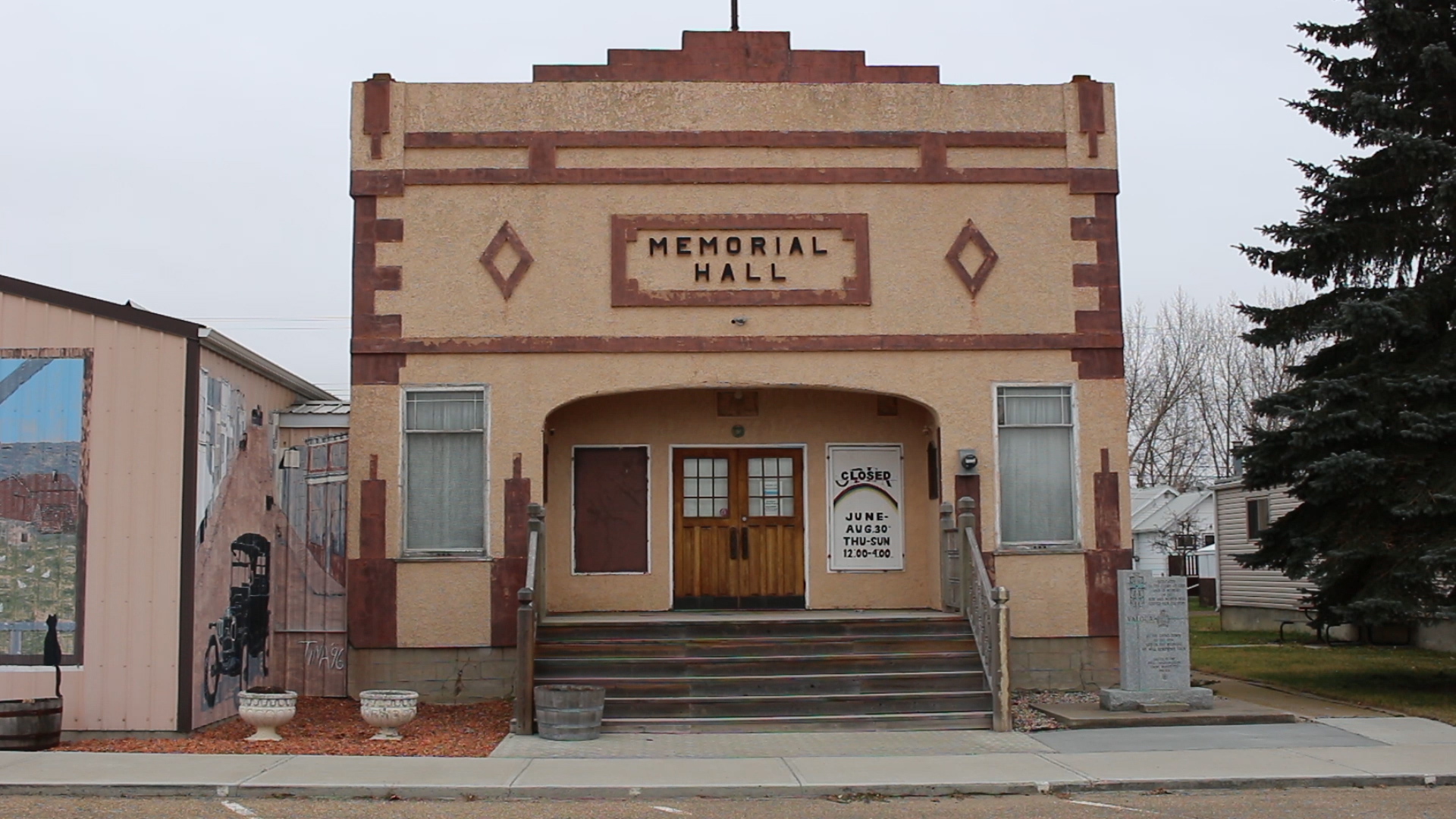
Memorial Hall, photographed in November 2015.

=== Strome Memorial Hall and Sodbusters Archive Museum ===
Strome Memorial Hall was founded in 1920 to honour Strome's war dead and double as a community hall. The building, which was replaced in 1935 following a fire, is also home to Strome's Sodbusters Archive Museum.

Memorial Hall was entered into the Canadian Register of Historic Places on May 4, 2012.

=== St. Peter's Church ===
The district's Catholic congregation opened St. Peter's Church in 1909, 15 km (9.3 mi) south of Strome's townsite. An attached cemetery began operating in 1911, which remains accessible to the public. The church received a new building in 1927, though its attendance numbers dwindled throughout the rest of the 20th century.

St. Peter's Church was designated a historical resource by Flagstaff County in 2013, and the building remains in occasional use for special services.

== Cemeteries ==
=== Rosevale Cemetery ===
Around 1905, early settlers from the Kyle and Seward families donated land to become a non-denominational graveyard, Rosevale Cemetery, around 4 km (2.5 mi) south of Strome. It is also known as Strome Village Cemetery.

=== Our Lady of Fatima Catholic Cemetery ===
Parishioners opened a Catholic church and cemetery within Strome's townsite in 1908. Originally dedicated to St. Joseph, it received a larger building in 1949, which was named Our Lady of Fatima Catholic Church. Though the church is no longer active as of 2026, Our Lady of Fatima Cemetery is presently maintained by the Archdiocese of Edmonton.

== See also ==
- List of communities in Alberta
- List of former urban municipalities in Alberta
- List of hamlets in Alberta
