= Hardisty, Alberta =

Town in Alberta, Canada

Hardisty
- Town
- Town of Hardisty
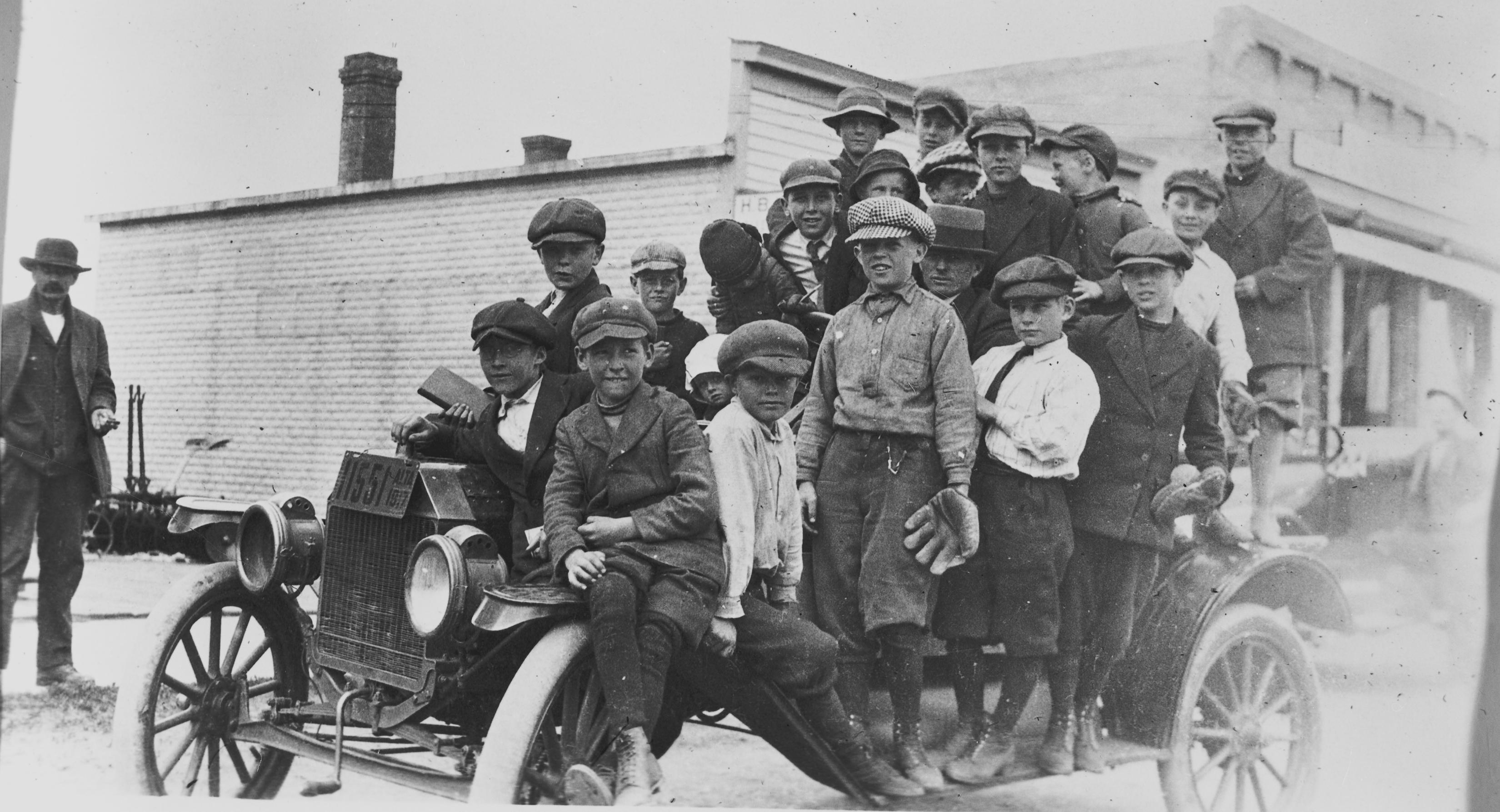
- Hardisty Boys' Baseball Team

- Location of Hardisty in Alberta
- Coordinates: 52°40′30.2″N 111°18′12.4″W
- Country: Canada
- Province: Alberta
- Region: Central Alberta
- Census division: 7
- Municipal district: Flagstaff County
- Incorporated
  - Village: December 11, 1906
  - Town: November 9, 1910
- Founded by: Canadian Pacific Railway
- Named after: Richard Hardisty

Government
  - Mayor: Brett Baumgartner
  - Governing body: Hardisty Town Council
  - MP: Pierre Poilievre
  - MLA: Jackie Lovely

Area (2021)
  - Land: 4.5 km^{2} (1.7 sq mi)
- Elevation: 615 m (2,018 ft)

Population (2021)
  - Total: 548
  - Density: 121.7/km^{2} (315/sq mi)
- Time zone: UTC−06:00 (Alberta Time)
- Postal code span: T0B 1V0
- Area code: 780
- Highways: Highway 13; Highway 881
- Waterway: Battle River
- Website: hardisty.ca

Hardisty is a town in Flagstaff County in east-central Alberta, Canada. It is approximately 111 kilometres (69 mi) from the Saskatchewan border, near the crossroads of Highway 13 and Highway 881, in the Battle River Valley. Hardisty is mainly known as a pivotal petroleum industry hub where petroleum products such as Western Canada Select blended crude oil and Hardisty heavy oil are produced and traded.

== History ==
Hardisty got its early local prominence by being the site of a railway station on an important CPR rail-line. The Town of Hardisty was named after Senator Richard Hardisty. It began in 1906 as a hamlet and railway centre, and officially became a town in 1911.

The first people known to have lived in the Battle River Valley were the native First Nations. This country was the wintering grounds for thousands of buffalo, moose, elk, and deer, which attracted these people to the area. The area was in contention between Cree and Blackfoot, hence the name of the nearby Battle River.

The Town of Hardisty owes its existence to the Canadian Pacific Railway. About 1904 the surveyors laid out the railroad line coming through the area. It was built from Wetaskiwin through Camrose, Daysland, Strome and Lougheed and joined with the CPR line coming west from Saskatoon (through Hayter), to form the CPR's short-line from Winnipeg to Edmonton. Railway officials decided to locate a divisional point at Hardisty because of the good water supply from the nearby Battle River. Hardisty was a trading centre as early as 1904.

In 1906 Hardisty had grown to a hamlet. It became a boom town by 1906, due to the influx of workers who were building the CPR. By the fall of 1906, the rail line reached Hardisty from Daysland. Then began the task of building the bridge, a task that took about three years.

Settlers also began arriving in large numbers. During 1906 to 1907, Hardisty was referred to as a tent town because people lived in tents until lumber could be hauled in. Business places sprang up overnight and, as with many towns, they were built along the railroad track running through the community.

== Demographics ==
In the 2021 Census of Population conducted by Statistics Canada, the Town of Hardisty had a population of 548 living in 247 of its 382 total private dwellings, a change of −1.1% from its 2016 population of 554. With a land area of 4.5 km^{2} (1.7 sq mi), it had a population density of 121.8/km^{2} (315.4/sq mi) in 2021.

In the 2016 Census of Population conducted by Statistics Canada, the Town of Hardisty recorded a population of 554 living in 254 of its 401 total private dwellings, a −13.3% change from its 2011 population of 639. With a land area of 5.13 km^{2} (1.98 sq mi), it had a population density of 108.0/km^{2} (279.7/sq mi) in 2016.

== Economy ==
The main industries in and around Hardisty are petroleum and farming. There is a large petroleum "tank farm" near Hardisty, which is also a nexus of oil pipelines. The oil industry in Hardisty focuses primarily on transport rather than oil processing or collection. Some of the petroleum companies are: Gibson Energy, Enbridge, TC Energy, Cenovus/Husky Energy and many others.

Hardisty is the start of the proposed Keystone XL Pipeline, which is intended to transport synthetic crude oil, blended crude oil from the Athabasca oil sands to refineries in the United States.

== Attractions ==
Hardisty Lake Park is located within the town limits and has camping, swimming, boating, trout fishing, golfing, baseball diamonds, rodeos and sporting events. Hardisty also has a soccer field, a curling rink, a hockey rink, and cross-country skiing. The Hardisty area is also known for upland game, geese, duck, mule deer and whitetail deer hunting.

== Education ==
Hardisty's school is named Allan Johnstone School, and teaches kindergarten and Grades 1 to 9. This school was shut down in 2020 with students now needing to attend schools in neighbouring areas. High school students (Grades 10 to 12), are taken by bus to Sedgewick. There is also a playschool in Hardisty.

== Television ==
Paperny Films taped the reality television show The Week The Women Went in Hardisty from June 2 to June 9, 2007. It aired on CBC in Canada for eight consecutive weeks starting January 21, 2008. The show explored what happens when all the women in an ordinary Canadian town disappear for a week and leave the men and children to cope on their own.

== See also ==
- List of communities in Alberta
- List of towns in Alberta
- Hardisty Airport
- List of oil pipelines
