= List of villages in Alberta =

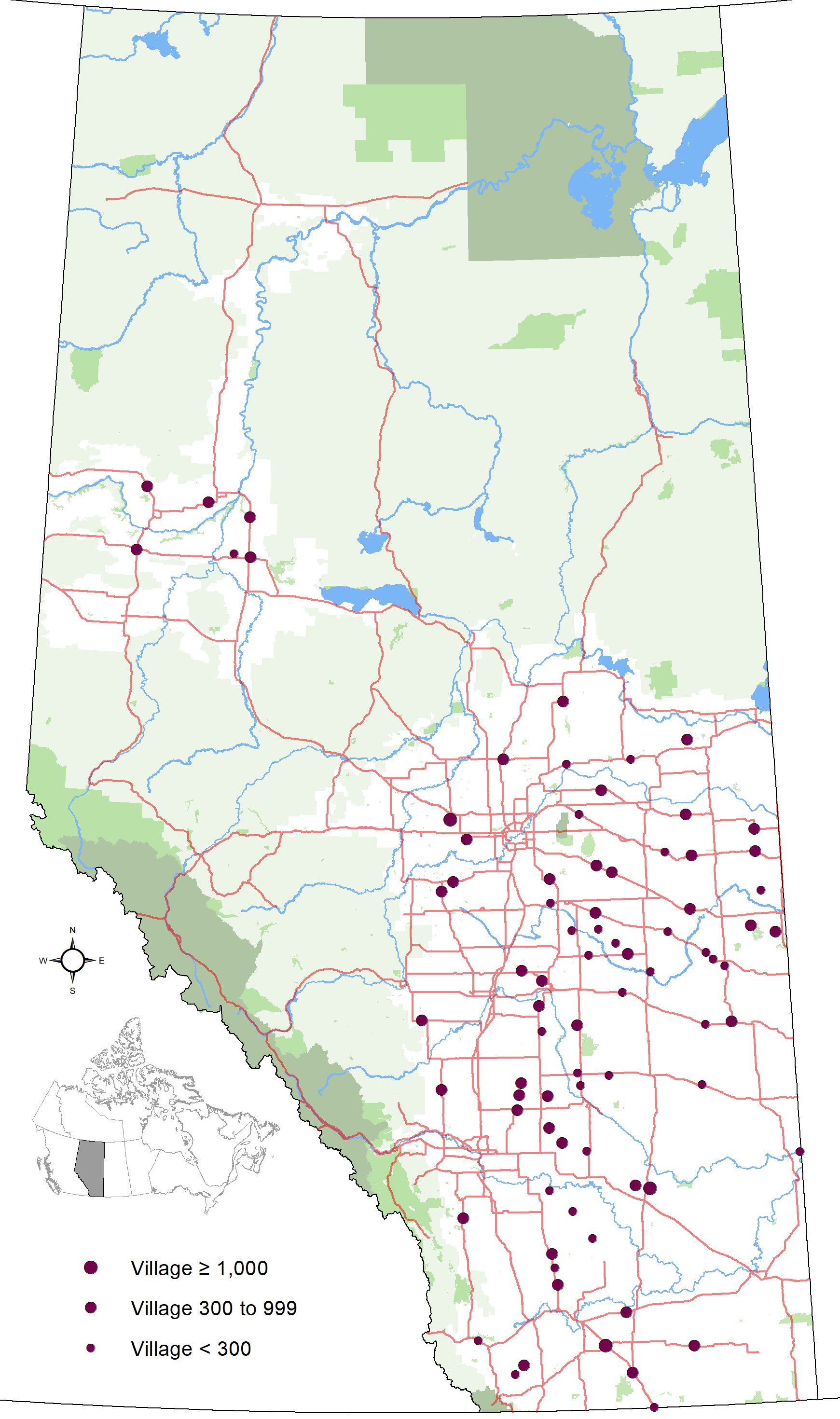
Distribution of Alberta's 80 villages as of 2024

A village is an urban municipality status type used in the Canadian province of Alberta. Alberta villages are created when communities with populations of at least 300 people, where a majority of their buildings are on parcels of land smaller than 1,850 m^{2}, apply to Alberta Municipal Affairs for village status under the authority of the Municipal Government Act. Applications for village status are approved via orders in council made by the Lieutenant Governor in Council under recommendation from the Minister of Municipal Affairs.

As of 2026, Alberta had 78 villages that had a cumulative population of 32,191 in the 2021 Census of Population. Alberta's largest and smallest villages are Stirling and Edberg with population counts of 1,164 and 126.

When a village's population reaches or exceeds 1,000 people, the council may request a change to town status, but the change in incorporated status is not mandatory. Villages with populations less than 300, whether their populations have declined below 300 or they were incorporated as villages prior to the minimum 300 population requirement, are permitted to retain village status.

Village governance is delivered by 318 elected village officials (78 mayors and 240 councillors) throughout the province.

== Administration ==
Pursuant to Part 5, Division 1 of the Municipal Government Act (MGA), each municipality created under the authority of the MGA is governed by a council. As a requirement of the MGA, a village council consists of three councillors by default, one of which is the village's chief elected official (CEO) or mayor. A village council may consist of a higher number if council passes a bylaw altering its size. For the 2017–2021 term, 36 villages had a council of three, 1 had a council of four, and 44 had a council of five.

Village councils are governed by a mayor and typically an even number of councillors that are elected by popular vote, resulting in a total odd number of councillors to avoid tie votes on council matters. All council members are elected under the provisions of the Local Authorities Election Act (LAEA). Mayoral or councillor candidates are required to be residents of their municipality for a minimum of six consecutive months prior to nomination day. The last municipal election was October 18, 2021.

Alberta Municipal Affairs, a ministry of the Cabinet of Alberta, is charged with coordination of all levels of local government.

Administrative duties of villages include public safety, roads, water service, drainage and waste collection, as well as coordination of infrastructure with provincial and regional authorities (including road construction, education, and health).

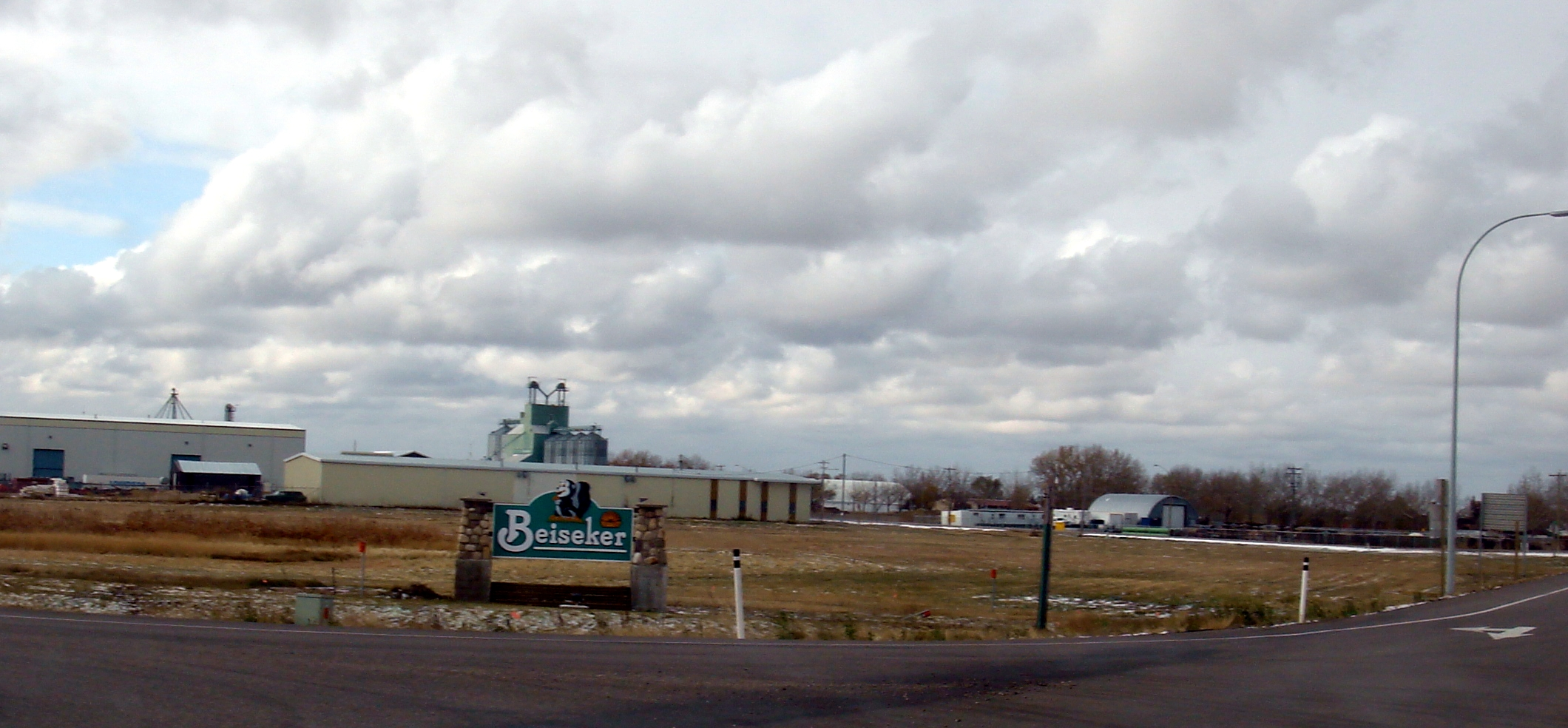
Beiseker

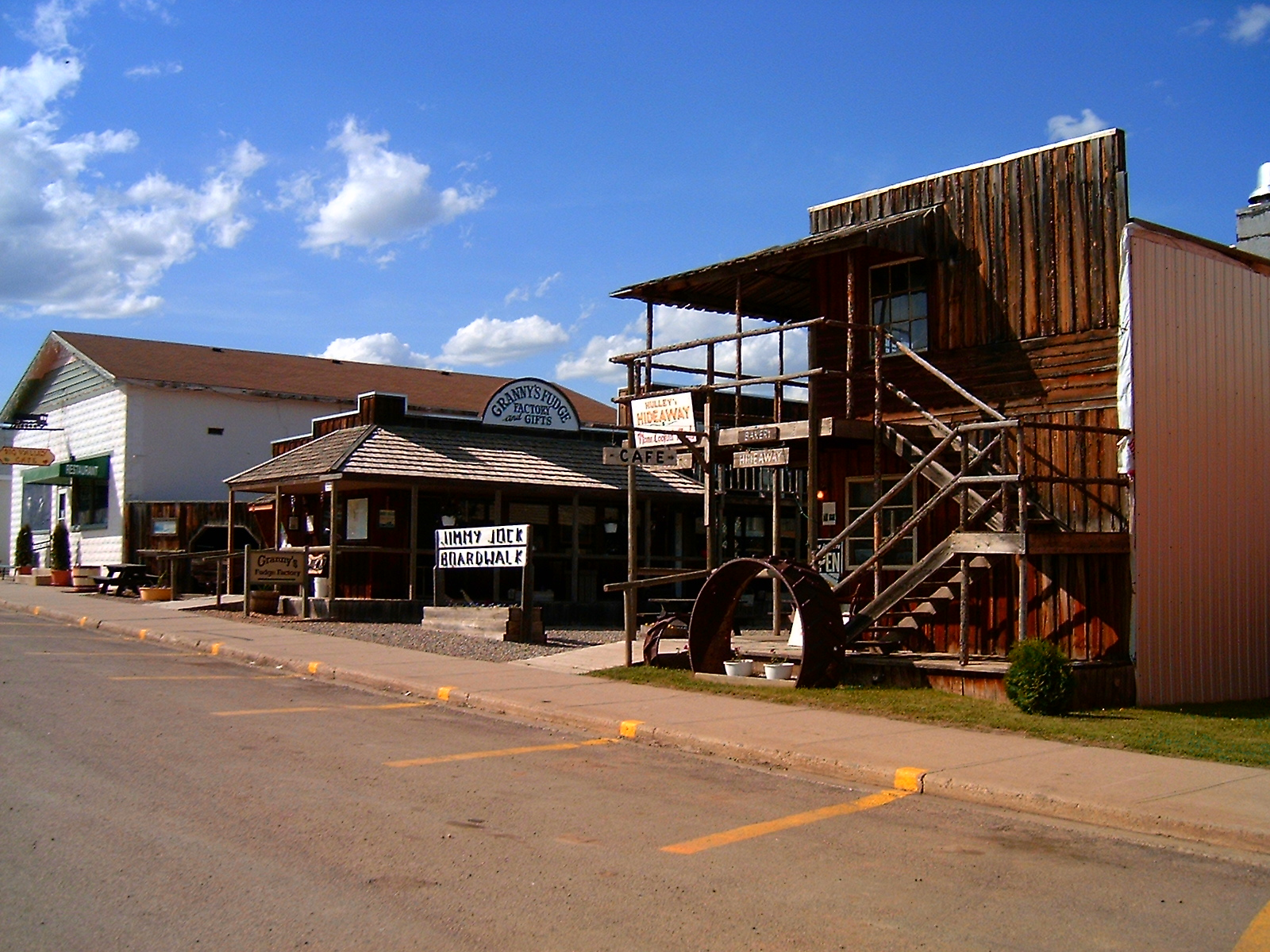
Big Valley

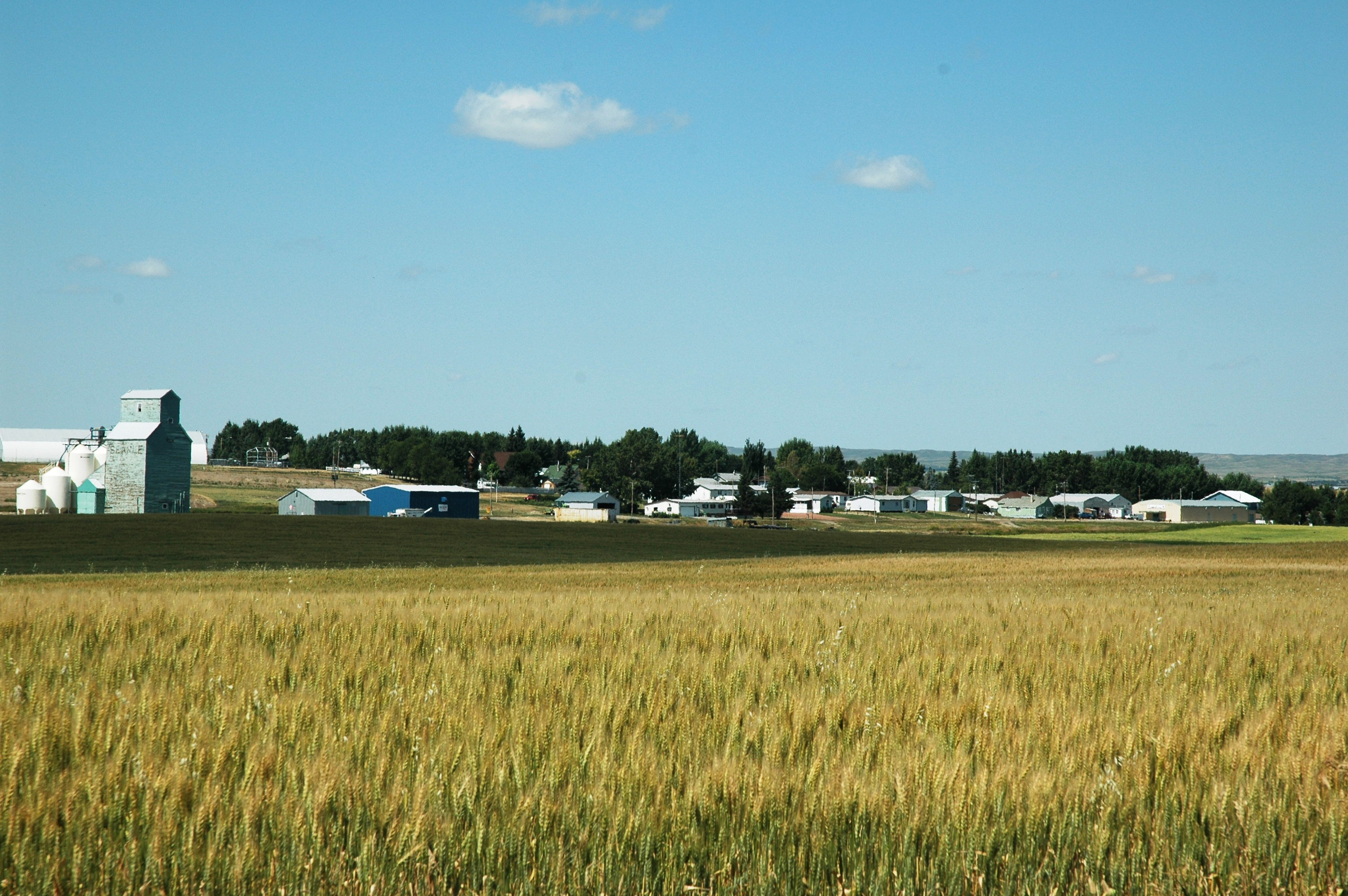
Milo

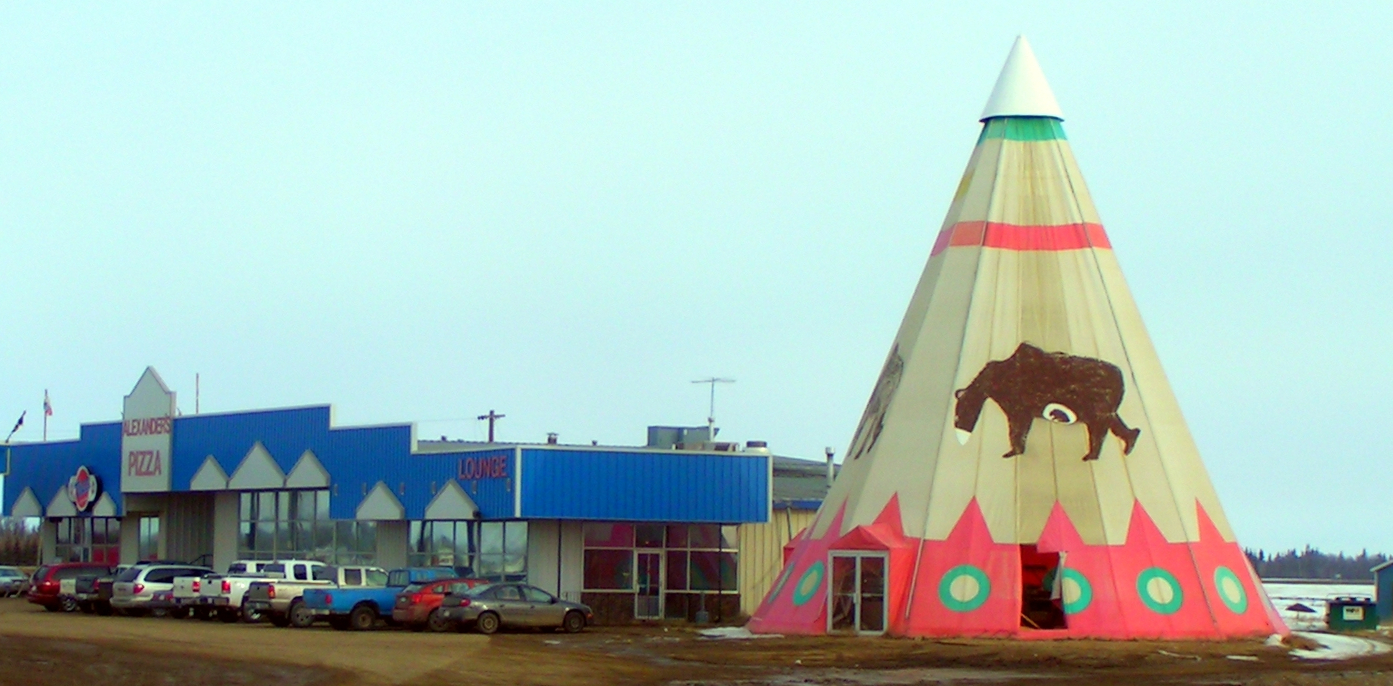
Rycroft

== List ==
List of villages in Alberta
Name	Rural municipality	Incorporation date (village)	2021 Census of Population				
Name	Rural municipality	Incorporation date (village)	Population (2021)	Population (2016)	Change	Land area (km²)	Population density (/km²)
Acme	Kneehill County	July 7, 1910	606	653	−7.2%	2.49	243.4
Alberta Beach	Lac Ste. Anne County	January 1, 1999	864	1,018	−15.1%	2.02	427.7
Alix	Lacombe County	June 3, 1907	774	734	+5.4%	3.11	248.9
Alliance	Flagstaff County	August 26, 1918	166	159	+4.4%	0.62	267.7
Amisk	Provost No. 52, MD of	January 1, 1956	219	204	+7.4%	0.76	288.2
Andrew	Lamont County	June 24, 1930	366	425	−13.9%	1.18	310.2
Arrowwood	Vulcan County	May 13, 1926	188	207	−9.2%	0.75	250.7
Barnwell	Taber, MD of	January 1, 1980	978	947	+3.3%	1.5	652.0
Barons	Lethbridge County	May 6, 1910	313	341	−8.2%	0.81	386.4
Bawlf	Camrose County	October 12, 1906	412	422	−2.4%	0.89	462.9
Beiseker	Rocky View County	February 23, 1921	754	819	−7.9%	2.85	264.6
Berwyn	Peace No. 135, MD of	November 28, 1936	577	538	+7.2%	1.57	367.5
Big Valley	Stettler No. 6, County of	March 9, 1942	331	346	−4.3%	1.86	178.0
Bittern Lake (Note: Bittern Lake was formerly known as Rosenroll prior to December 16, 1911.)	Camrose County	November 2, 1904	216	220	−1.8%	6.57	32.9
Boyle	Athabasca County	December 31, 1953	825	845	−2.4%	7.12	115.9
Breton	Brazeau County	January 1, 1957	567	574	−1.2%	1.72	329.7
Carbon	Kneehill County	November 18, 1912	492	454	+8.4%	1.99	247.2
Carmangay	Vulcan County	March 4, 1936	269	242	+11.2%	1.8	149.4
Champion	Vulcan County	May 27, 1911	351	317	+10.7%	0.88	398.9
Chauvin	Wainwright No. 61, MD of	December 30, 1912	304	335	−9.3%	2.22	136.9
Chipman	Lamont County	October 21, 1913	246	274	−10.2%	9.6	25.6
Clive	Lacombe County	January 9, 1912	775	715	+8.4%	2.17	357.1
Clyde	Westlock County	January 28, 1914	415	430	−3.5%	1.28	324.2
Consort	Special Area No. 4	September 23, 1912	644	729	−11.7%	3.02	213.2
Coutts	Warner No. 5, County of	January 1, 1960	224	245	−8.6%	1.18	189.8
Cowley	Pincher Creek No. 9, MD of	August 16, 1906	216	209	+3.3%	1.36	158.8
Cremona	Mountain View County	January 1, 1955	437	444	−1.6%	1.93	226.4
Czar	Provost No. 52, MD of	November 12, 1917	248	202	+22.8%	1.12	221.4
Delburne	Red Deer County	January 17, 1913	919	892	+3.0%	3.79	242.5
Delia (Note: Delia was formerly known as Highland prior to December 9, 1915.)	Starland County	July 20, 1914	152	216	−29.6%	1.33	114.3
Donalda	Stettler No. 6, County of	December 30, 1912	226	219	+3.2%	0.97	233.0
Donnelly	Smoky River No. 130, MD of	January 1, 1956	338	359	−5.8%	1.26	268.3
Duchess	Newell, County of	May 12, 1921	1,053	1,085	−2.9%	1.93	545.6
Edberg	Camrose County	February 4, 1930	126	151	−16.6%	0.35	360.0
Edgerton	Wainwright No. 61, MD of	September 11, 1917	385	384	+0.3%	2.01	191.5
Elnora	Red Deer County	July 22, 1929	288	298	−3.4%	1.5	192.0
Empress	Special Area No. 2	February 5, 1914	148	135	+9.6%	1.58	93.7
Foremost	Forty Mile No. 8, County of	December 31, 1950	630	541	+16.5%	2.13	295.8
Forestburg	Flagstaff County	August 21, 1919	807	880	−8.3%	4.04	199.8
Girouxville	Smoky River No. 130, MD of	December 31, 1951	278	219	+26.9%	0.66	421.2
Glendon	Bonnyville No. 87, MD of	January 1, 1956	338	493	−31.4%	1.99	169.8
Glenwood	Cardston County	January 1, 1961	272	316	−13.9%	1.37	198.5
Hay Lakes (Note: Hay Lakes was formerly known as Hay Lake prior to January 1, 1932.)	Camrose County	April 17, 1928	456	495	−7.9%	0.59	772.9
Heisler	Flagstaff County	January 1, 1961	135	160	−15.6%	0.63	214.3
Hill Spring	Cardston County	January 1, 1961	168	162	+3.7%	0.96	175.0
Hines Creek	Clear Hills County	December 31, 1951	335	346	−3.2%	4.88	68.6
Holden	Beaver County	April 14, 1909	338	350	−3.4%	1.55	218.1
Hughenden	Provost No. 52, MD of	December 27, 1917	213	243	−12.3%	0.78	273.1
Hussar	Wheatland County	April 20, 1928	187	193	−3.1%	1	187.0
Innisfree	Minburn No. 27, County of	March 11, 1911	193	220	−12.3%	1.01	191.1
Irma	Wainwright No. 61, MD of	May 30, 1912	477	521	−8.4%	1.32	361.4
Kitscoty	Vermilion River, County of	March 22, 1911	852	925	−7.9%	1.51	564.2
Linden	Kneehill County	January 1, 1964	704	828	−15.0%	2.55	276.1
Lomond	Vulcan County	February 16, 1916	178	166	+7.2%	1.19	149.6
Longview	Foothills County	January 1, 1964	297	307	−3.3%	1.1	270.0
Lougheed	Flagstaff County	November 7, 1911	225	256	−12.1%	2	112.5
Mannville	Minburn No. 27, County of	December 29, 1906	765	828	−7.6%	1.64	466.5
Marwayne	Vermilion River, County of	December 31, 1952	543	564	−3.7%	1.6	339.4
Milo	Vulcan County	May 7, 1931	136	91	+49.5%	0.96	141.7
Morrin	Starland County	April 16, 1920	205	240	−14.6%	0.67	306.0
Munson	Starland County	May 5, 1911	170	192	−11.5%	2.56	66.4
Myrnam	Two Hills No. 21, County of	August 22, 1930	257	339	−24.2%	2.75	93.5
Nampa	Northern Sunrise County	January 1, 1958	367	364	+0.8%	1.69	217.2
Paradise Valley	Vermilion River, County of	January 1, 1964	153	179	−14.5%	0.63	242.9
Rockyford	Wheatland County	March 28, 1919	395	316	+25.0%	1.04	379.8
Rosalind	Camrose County	January 1, 1966	162	188	−13.8%	0.62	261.3
Rosemary	Newell, County of	December 31, 1951	370	396	−6.6%	0.59	627.1
Rycroft	Spirit River No. 133, MD of	March 15, 1944	550	612	−10.1%	1.85	297.3
Ryley (Note: Ryley was also known as Equity in 1909.)	Beaver County	April 2, 1910	484	483	+0.2%	2.53	191.3
Spring Lake (Note: Spring Lake was formerly known as Edmonton Beach prior to January 1, 1999.)	Parkland County	January 1, 1999	711	699	+1.7%	2.28	311.8
Standard	Wheatland County	April 29, 1922	353	353	0.0%	2.34	150.9
Stirling	Warner No. 5, County of	September 3, 1901	1,164	978	+19.0%	2.7	431.1
Veteran	Special Area No. 4	June 30, 1914	214	207	+3.4%	0.84	254.8
Vilna	Smoky Lake County	June 23, 1923	268	290	−7.6%	0.96	279.2
Warburg	Leduc County	December 31, 1953	676	766	−11.7%	2.56	264.1
Warner	Warner No. 5, County of	November 12, 1908	364	373	−2.4%	1.16	313.8
Waskatenau	Smoky Lake County	May 19, 1932	247	186	+32.8%	0.59	418.6
Youngstown	Special Area No. 3	December 31, 1936	171	154	+11.0%	1.11	154.1
Total villages	—	—	32,191	33,176	−3.0%	143.71	224.0

== Village status eligibility ==
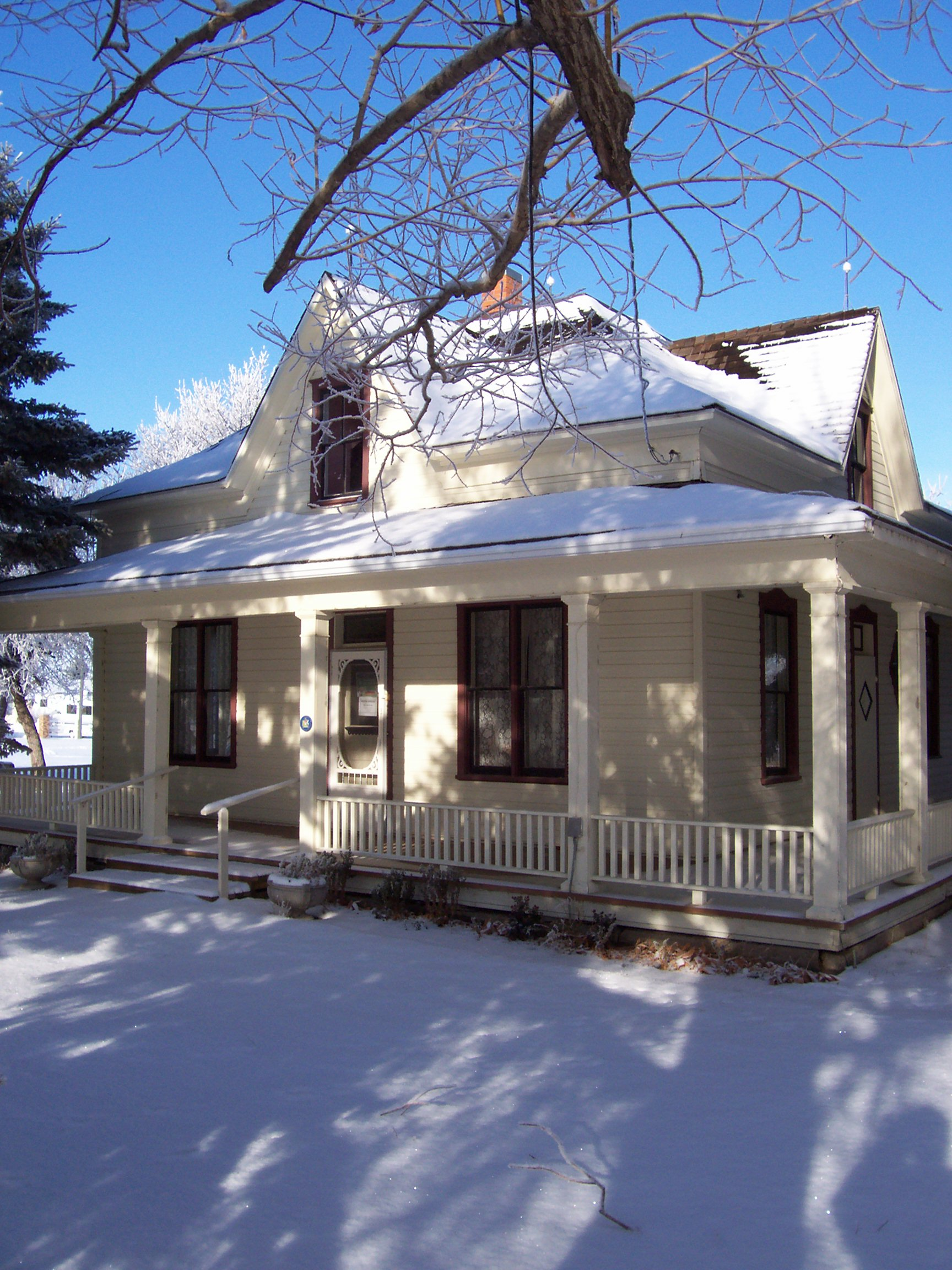
Stirling is Alberta's largest village by population

Numerous Alberta hamlets meet the minimum population requirement for village status eligibility.

== Town status eligibility ==
The villages of Stirling and Duchess are currently eligible for town status having populations of 1,164 and 1,053.

== Former villages ==
Of Alberta's 106 former urban municipalities, 85 of them were former villages prior to being dissolved, annexed, or amalgamated.

Former village	Original name	Dissolution date
Albert Park		August 1, 1935
Alderson	Carlstadt	January 31, 1936
Bellevue		January 1, 1979
Bellis		January 1, 1946
Blackie		August 31, 1997
Bow City		April 17, 1918
Burdett		January 1, 2003
Cadogan		January 1, 1946
Caroline		January 1, 2025
Cayley		June 1, 1996
Cereal		January 1, 2021
Chinook		April 1, 1977
Clairmont		January 1, 1946
Cluny		September 15, 1995
Commerce	Coalgate	May 13, 1926
Compeer		December 31, 1936
Craigmyle		January 1, 1972
Crescent Heights		January 1, 1911
Derwent		September 1, 2010
Dewberry		January 1, 2021
Drinnan		April 1, 1957
Dunmore		February 4, 1919
Eaglesham		December 31, 1996
East Calgary		July 17, 1919
Enchant		February 1, 1945
Entwistle		December 31, 2000
Erskine		May 10, 1946
Evansburg		June 30, 1998
Evarts		May 27, 1916
Ferintosh		January 1, 2020
Fort Assiniboine		December 31, 1991
Frank		January 1, 1979
Gadsby		February 1, 2020
Galahad		January 1, 2016
Grassy Lake		July 1, 1996
Grouard		January 15, 1944
Hairy Hill		December 31, 1996
Halkirk		January 1, 2025
Hythe		July 1, 2021
Islay		March 15, 1944
Jenner		June 25, 1943
Kinuso		September 1, 2009
Langdon		January 1, 1946
Lavoy		April 30, 1999
Lille		
Lundbreck		April 30, 1906
Minburn		July 1, 2015
Mirror		January 1, 2004
Monarch		December 31, 1938
Monitor		January 1, 1946
Mountain View		September 9, 1915
New Norway		November 1, 2012
New Sarepta		September 1, 2010
Newcastle		May 21, 1931
North Edmonton		July 22, 1912
North Red Deer		December 31, 1947
Ohaton		January 1, 1946
Pincher City		May 3, 1932
Plamondon		May 1, 2002
Port Cornwall		September 11, 1917
Radway		December 31, 1996
Ranfurly		January 1, 1946
Retlaw		March 1, 1939
Richdale		June 2, 1931
Riverside		
Rosebud		January 1, 1946
Rouleauville		
Rumsey		April 1, 1995
Sangudo		September 16, 2007
Stafford		January 1, 1913
Strome		January 1, 2016
Suffield		January 1, 1930
Swalwell		January 1, 1946
Thorhild		April 1, 2009
Tilley		August 31, 2013
Tollerton		January 26, 1918
Torrington		December 31, 1997
Wabamun		January 1, 2021
Walsh		May 4, 1925
Wanham		December 31, 1999
Warspite		June 1, 2000
West Edmonton	Calder	April 5, 1917
Wildwood		December 31, 1990
Willingdon		September 1, 2017

== See also ==
- List of census divisions of Alberta
- List of cities in Alberta
- List of communities in Alberta
- List of hamlets in Alberta
- List of municipal districts in Alberta
- List of municipalities in Alberta
- List of summer villages in Alberta
- List of towns in Alberta
