= Lougheed, Alberta =

Lougheed
- Village
- Village of Lougheed
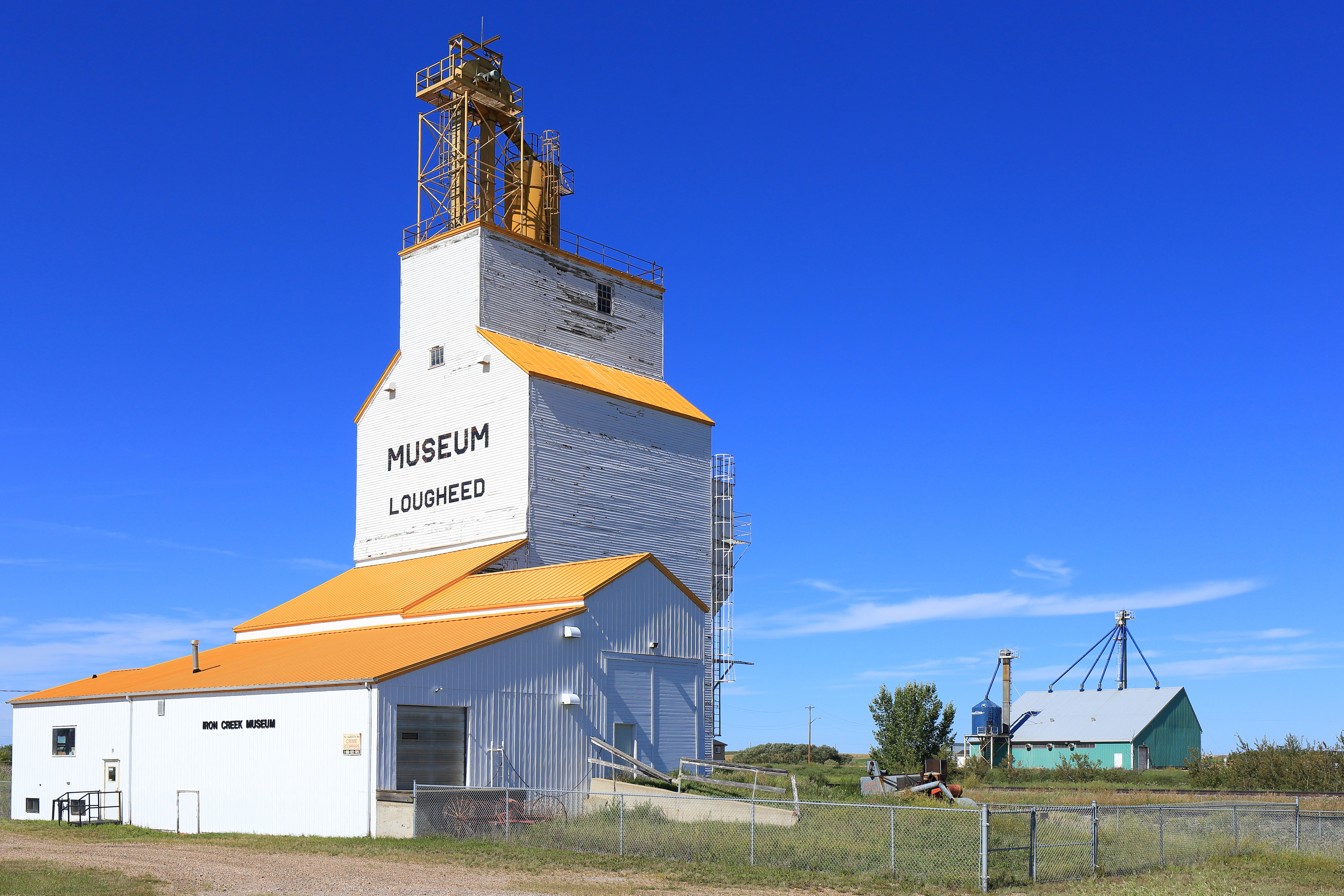

- Location within Alberta
- Coordinates: 52°44′47″N 111°32′47″W
- Country: Canada
- Province: Alberta
- Region: Central Alberta
- Census Division: No. 7
- Municipal district: Flagstaff County
- Incorporated
  - Village: November 7, 1911
- Founded by: Canadian Pacific Railway
- Named after: Sir James Lougheed

Government
  - Mayor: Tristin Johnson
  - Governing body: Lougheed Village Council

Area (2021)
  - Land: 2 km^{2} (0.77 sq mi)
- Elevation: 660 m (2,170 ft)

Population (2021)
  - Total: 225
  - Density: 112.5/km^{2} (291/sq mi)
- Time zone: UTC−06:00 (Alberta Time)
- Highways: 13; 870
- Website: www.villageoflougheed.com

Lougheed is a village in central Alberta, Canada. It is 94 km south-east of Camrose, along Highway 13. The village was named after Sir James Lougheed, an Alberta senator from 1889 to 1925.

== Demographics ==
In the 2021 Census of Population conducted by Statistics Canada, the Village of Lougheed had a population of 225 living in 95 of its 117 total private dwellings, a change of −12.1% from its 2016 population of 256. With a land area of 2 km^{2} (0.77 sq mi), it had a population density of 112.5/km^{2} (291.4/sq mi) in 2021.

In the 2016 Census of Population conducted by Statistics Canada, the Village of Lougheed recorded a population of 256 living in 108 of its 118 total private dwellings, a 9.9% change from its 2011 population of 233. With a land area of 2.1 km^{2} (0.81 sq mi), it had a population density of 121.9/km^{2} (315.7/sq mi) in 2016.

The Village of Lougheed's 2013 municipal census counted a population of 273, a 7.5% change from its 2010 municipal census population of 254.

== See also ==
- List of communities in Alberta
- List of villages in Alberta
