= Bittern Lake =

Bittern Lake Rosenroll (1904–1911)
- Village
- Village of Bittern Lake
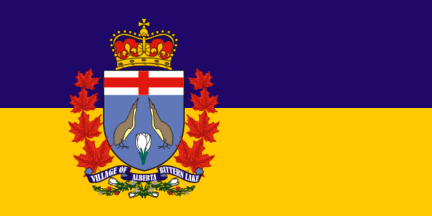
- Flag

- Location in Alberta
- Coordinates: 53°00′16.3″N 113°03′32.5″W
- Country: Canada
- Province: Alberta
- Region: Central Alberta
- Census division: 10
- Municipal district: Camrose County
- Incorporated
  - Village: November 21, 1904 (as Rosenroll)
  - Name change: December 16, 1911

Government
  - Mayor: Charlie Debnam (acting)
  - Governing body: Bittern Lake Village Council

Area (2021)
  - Land: 6.57 km^{2} (2.54 sq mi)
- Elevation: 862 m (2,828 ft)

Population (2021)
  - Total: 216
  - Density: 32.9/km^{2} (85/sq mi)
- Time zone: UTC−06:00 (Alberta Time)
- Postal code: T0C 0L0
- Highways: Highway 13
- Waterway: Bittern Lake
- Website: Official website

Bittern Lake, originally named Rosenroll, is a village in central Alberta, Canada. It is located between Camrose and Wetaskiwin, on Highway 13. The first post office opened in the home of Ernest Roper in 1899. It was known as the Village of Rosenroll between 1904 and 1911. The present name comes from Cree Indians in the area, on account of bittern near the lake.

The lake itself is not accessible by road, and is not recommended for boating or fishing due to its high counts of alkali and its shallow waters. Locals enjoy the scenic walking trails around the lake as well as observing the native birds that nest in the area. The nearest shopping is in Camrose, Alberta.

== Demographics ==
In the 2021 Census of Population conducted by Statistics Canada, the Village of Bittern Lake had a population of 216 living in 83 of its 84 total private dwellings, a change of −1.8% from its 2016 population of 220. With a land area of 6.57 km^{2} (2.54 sq mi), it had a population density of 32.9/km^{2} (85.2/sq mi) in 2021.

In the 2016 Census of Population conducted by Statistics Canada, the Village of Bittern Lake recorded a population of 220 living in 86 of its 88 total private dwellings, a −1.8% change from its 2011 population of 224. With a land area of 6.57 km^{2} (2.54 sq mi), it had a population density of 33.5/km^{2} (86.7/sq mi) in 2016.

== See also ==
- List of communities in Alberta
- List of villages in Alberta
