= Edberg, Alberta =

Edberg
- Village
- Village of Edberg
- Location in Alberta
- Coordinates: 52.78429°N 112.78582°W
- Country: Canada
- Province: Alberta
- Region: Central Alberta
- Census division: 10
- Municipal district: Camrose County
- Incorporated
  - Village: February 4, 1930

Government
  - Mayor: Ian Daykin
  - Governing body: Edberg Village Council
  - Deputy Mayor: Jacquie Boulet
  - Councilor: David Butt

Area (2021)
  - Land: 0.35 km^{2} (0.14 sq mi)
- Elevation: 758 m (2,487 ft)

Population (2021)
  - Total: 126
  - Density: 356.1/km^{2} (922/sq mi)
- Time zone: UTC−06:00 (Alberta Time)
- Highways: Highway 56
- Waterway: Driedmeat Lake
- Website: Official website

Edberg is a village in central Alberta, Canada. It is approximately 31 km (19 mi) south of Camrose.

Johan Edstrom, an early postmaster, named the village after himself.

== Demographics ==
In the 2021 Census of Population conducted by Statistics Canada, the Village of Edberg had a population of 126 living in 58 of its 67 total private dwellings, a change of −16.6% from its 2016 population of 151. With a land area of 0.35 km^{2} (0.14 sq mi), it had a population density of 360.0/km^{2} (932.4/sq mi) in 2021.

In the 2016 Census of Population conducted by Statistics Canada, the Village of Edberg recorded a population of 151 living in 61 of its 65 total private dwellings, a −10.1% change from its 2011 population of 168. With a land area of 0.35 km^{2} (0.14 sq mi), it had a population density of 431.4/km^{2} (1,117.4/sq mi) in 2016.

== Notable people ==
- Aritha Van Herk - Canadian writer, critic, editor, public intellectual, and university professor

== See also ==
- List of communities in Alberta
- List of villages in Alberta
