= Heisler, Alberta =

Heisler
- Village
- Village of Heisler
- Location within Alberta
- Coordinates: 52°40′13″N 112°13′13″W
- Country: Canada
- Province: Alberta
- Region: Central Alberta
- Census Division: No. 7
- Incorporated
  - Village: July 27, 1920
  - Dissolution: March 29, 1938
  - Village: January 1, 1961

Government
  - Mayor: Brandon Martz
  - Governing body: Heisler Village Council

Area (2021)
  - Land: 0.63 km^{2} (0.24 sq mi)
- Elevation: 725 m (2,379 ft)

Population (2021)
  - Total: 135
  - Density: 214.4/km^{2} (555/sq mi)
- Time zone: UTC−06:00 (Alberta Time)
- Highways: 855
- Website: www.villageofheisler.ca

Heisler /ˈhaɪzlər/ is a village in central Alberta, Canada. It is 23 km south of Daysland and 20 km north of Forestburg.

The community has the name of Martin Heisler, the original owner of the land. It is the home of Canada's largest baseball glove—a sculpture and roadside attraction.

== Demographics ==
In the 2021 Census of Population conducted by Statistics Canada, the Village of Heisler had a population of 135 living in 68 of its 79 total private dwellings, a change of −15.6% from its 2016 population of 160. With a land area of 0.63 km^{2} (0.24 sq mi), it had a population density of 214.3/km^{2} (555.0/sq mi) in 2021.

In the 2016 Census of Population conducted by Statistics Canada, the Village of Heisler recorded a population of 160 living in 74 of its 87 total private dwellings, a 6% change from its 2011 population of 151. With a land area of 0.64 km^{2} (0.25 sq mi), it had a population density of 250.0/km^{2} (647.5/sq mi) in 2016.

== See also ==
- List of communities in Alberta
- List of villages in Alberta
