= Hughenden, Alberta =

Hughenden
- Village
- Village of Hughenden
- Location within Alberta
- Coordinates: 52°30′39″N 110°58′11″W
- Country: Canada
- Province: Alberta
- Region: Central Alberta
- Census Division: No. 7
- Municipal district: Municipal District of Provost No. 52
- Incorporated
  - Village: December 27, 1917

Government
  - Mayor: Shelby Gill
  - Governing body: Hughenden Village Council

Area (2021)
  - Land: 0.78 km^{2} (0.30 sq mi)
- Elevation: 690 m (2,260 ft)

Population (2021)
  - Total: 213
  - Density: 272.5/km^{2} (706/sq mi)
- Time zone: UTC−06:00 (Alberta Time)
- Highways: 13
- Website: Official website

Hughenden /hjuːˈɛndən/ is a village in central Alberta, Canada. It is located 49 km south of Wainwright, in the Municipal District of Provost No. 52, along Highway 13.

The community takes its name from the Hughenden Manor, home of Benjamin Disraeli.

== Demographics ==
In the 2021 Census of Population conducted by Statistics Canada, the Village of Hughenden had a population of 213 living in 97 of its 112 total private dwellings, a change of −12.3% from its 2016 population of 243. With a land area of 0.78 km^{2} (0.30 sq mi), it had a population density of 273.1/km^{2} (707.3/sq mi) in 2021.

In the 2016 Census of Population conducted by Statistics Canada, the Village of Hughenden recorded a population of 243 living in 101 of its 117 total private dwellings, a 5.7% change from its 2011 population of 230. With a land area of 0.78 km^{2} (0.30 sq mi), it had a population density of 311.5/km^{2} (806.9/sq mi) in 2016.

The Village of Hughenden's 2012 municipal census counted a population of 258, a 0.3% decrease over its 2008 municipal census population of 266.

== See also ==
- List of communities in Alberta
- List of francophone communities in Alberta
- List of villages in Alberta
