= Municipal District of Provost No. 52 =

Municipal district in Alberta, Canada

- Municipal district
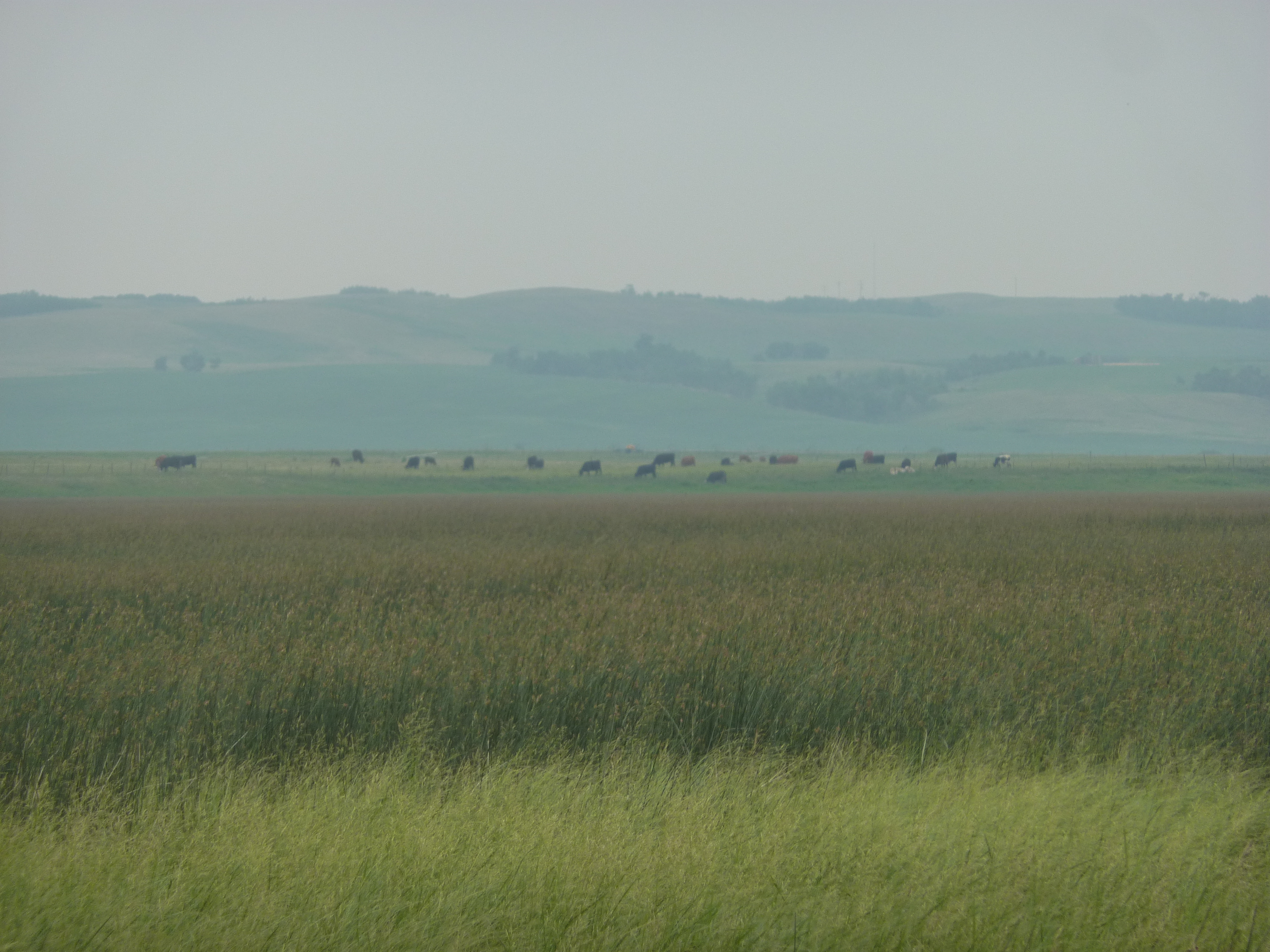
- Pasture in the MD of Provost No. 52

- Location within Alberta
- Country: Canada
- Province: Alberta
- Region: Central Alberta
- Census division: 7
- Established: 1943
- Incorporated: 1943

Government
  - Reeve: Allan Murray
  - Governing body: MD of Provost Council
  - Administrative office: Provost

Area (2021)
  - Land: 3,571.12 km^{2} (1,378.82 sq mi)

Population (2021)
  - Total: 2,071
  - Density: 0.6/km^{2} (1.6/sq mi)
- Time zone: UTC−06:00 (Alberta Time)
- Website: mdprovost.ca

The Municipal District of Provost No. 52 is a municipal district (MD) in east-central Alberta, Canada, on the Alberta/Saskatchewan border. Located in Census Division No. 7, its municipal office is located in the Town of Provost.

== History ==
The MD of Provost No. 52 was established in 1943 through the amalgamation of the MD of Hillcrest No. 362 and the MD of Sifton No. 391.

== Geography ==
=== Communities and localities ===
The following urban municipalities are surrounded by the MD of Provost No. 52.

Cities

- none

Towns

- Provost

Villages

- Amisk
- Czar
- Hughenden

Summer villages

- none

The following hamlets are located within the MD of Provost No. 52.

Hamlets

- Bodo
- Cadogan
- Hayter
- Metiskow

The following localities are located within the MD of Provost No. 52.

Localities

- Airways
- Battle Ridge
- Buffalo View
- Cairns
- Cousins
- Craigmillar
- Green Glade
- Kessler
- Lakesend
- Neutral Hills
- Nilrem
- Rosenheim
- Rosyth

== Demographics ==
In the 2021 Census of Population conducted by Statistics Canada, the MD of Provost No. 52 had a population of 2,071 living in 851 of its 969 total private dwellings, a change of −6.1% from its 2016 population of 2,205. With a land area of 3,571.12 km^{2} (1,378.82 sq mi), it had a population density of 0.6/km^{2} (1.5/sq mi) in 2021.

In the 2016 Census of Population conducted by Statistics Canada, the MD of Provost No. 52 had a population of 2,205 living in 825 of its 930 total private dwellings, a −3.6% change from its 2011 population of 2,288. With a land area of 3,628.39 km^{2} (1,400.93 sq mi), it had a population density of 0.6/km^{2} (1.6/sq mi) in 2016.

== See also ==
- List of communities in Alberta
- List of municipal districts in Alberta
