= Division No. 7, Alberta =

Census division in Canada

Coordinates: 52.72°N 111.72°W

Division No. 7
- Census division in Alberta
- Country: Canada
- Province: Alberta

Area
  - Total: 19,210 km^{2} (7,420 sq mi)

Population (2021)
  - Total: 40,684
  - Density: 2.118/km^{2} (5.485/sq mi)

Division No. 7 is a census division in Alberta, Canada. It is located in the southeast corner of central Alberta and its largest urban community is the Town of Wainwright.

== Census subdivisions ==
The following census subdivisions (municipalities or municipal equivalents) are located within Alberta's Division No. 7.

- Towns
  - Castor
  - Coronation
  - Daysland
  - Hardisty
  - Killam
  - Provost
  - Sedgewick
  - Stettler
  - Wainwright
- Villages
  - Alliance
  - Amisk
  - Big Valley
  - Chauvin
  - Czar
  - Donalda
  - Edgerton
  - Forestburg
  - Heisler
  - Hughenden
  - Irma
  - Lougheed
- Summer villages
  - Rochon Sands
  - White Sands
- Municipal districts
  - Flagstaff County
  - Paintearth No. 18, County of
  - Provost No. 52, M.D. of
  - Stettler No. 6, County of
  - Wainwright No. 61, M.D. of

== Demographics ==
Historical population
Year	Pop.	±%
1991	39,694	—
1996	41,169	+3.7%
2001	40,407	−1.9%
2006	39,909	−1.2%
2011	40,232	+0.8%
2016	41,574	+3.3%
2021	40,684	−2.1%

In the 2021 Census of Population conducted by Statistics Canada, Division No. 7 had a population of 40,684 living in 16,112 of its 18,726 total private dwellings, a change of −2.1% from its 2016 population of 41,574. With a land area of 18,909.66 km^{2} (7,301.06 sq mi), it had a population density of 2.2/km^{2} (5.6/sq mi) in 2021.

== See also ==
- List of census divisions of Alberta
- List of communities in Alberta
