= Bardo, Alberta =

Locality in Alberta, Canada

Bardo
- Settlement
- Location of Bardo in Alberta
- Coordinates: 53.30014°N 112.68522°W
- Country: Canada
- Province: Alberta
- Region: Central Alberta
- Census division: Division No. 10, Alberta
- County: Beaver County
- Time zone: MDT
- Highways: Alberta Highway 834

Bardo is a locality in Alberta, Canada. The site is accessible via Range Road 192, two roads removed from Alberta Highway 834. It is situated 8 km from Tofield, 10 km from Kingman, and 14 km from Miquelon Lake Provincial Park.

== Toponymy ==
The name was selected by Norwegian residents of the settlement after Bardu Municipality (historically known as Bardo).

== Topography ==
Bardo is situated upon gently rolling hills with some slopes. Most of the area's soil is suitable for arable farming, although areas contain natural salt deposits.

== History ==
=== Pre-settlement ===
Bardo, as part of the Beaver Hills plain region, served as a hunting ground and rest stop for Indigenous peoples for up to 10,000 years before permanent settlement began. Members of the Nakota, Cree, Salteaux, and Blackfoot were among the groups who hunted and accessed water in the area.

=== Founding and development: 1894–1910 ===
Settlement began in 1894, primarily by Norwegian immigrants living in Crookston, Minnesota. In its first year, the locality had 44 residents. In 1895, influential local preacher Reverend Bersvend Anderson formed a Lutheran assembly that would, by 1974, hold the distinction of being the oldest continuing Evangelical Lutheran Church of Canada congregation. In 1896, local families hired an American-born tutor to provide education for children.

In 1898, a post office began serving the community under the name Northern, after English-speaking residents objected to the initial proposed name of 'Norden'. The community built a one-room schoolhouse named Bardo School, so called because a later wave of settlers hailed from Bardo in Norway. It was also known as Anderson School, after Bersvend Anderson.

The community also established Bardo Cemetery in 1898, and a general store named the Bardo Store followed in 1902, prompting the Northern post office to change its name to match in 1904. By this time, Bardo had a population of at least 113. Bardo Church was built for the area's Lutheran congregation in 1908.

In February 1910, the Grand Trunk Pacific Railway (GTPR) opened a railway station in Bardo as part of the Tofield–Calgary line. The line's opening was attended by Premier Alexander Rutherford, who took a train journey through Bardo. 1910 also saw the establishment of a two-room building for Anderson School, and telephone lines provided by Alberta Government Telephones.

=== Rest of 20th century: 1911–2000 ===
Bardo post office closed in October 1914, as mail service through nearby Tofield became more convenient. The original Bardo Church burned down in 1921 after suffering a lightning strike, and the community built a second the following year. The community received electricity in 1928. After Anderson School closed in 1959, some residents formed the Bardo Recreation Association to purchase the building and repurpose it into a community hall.

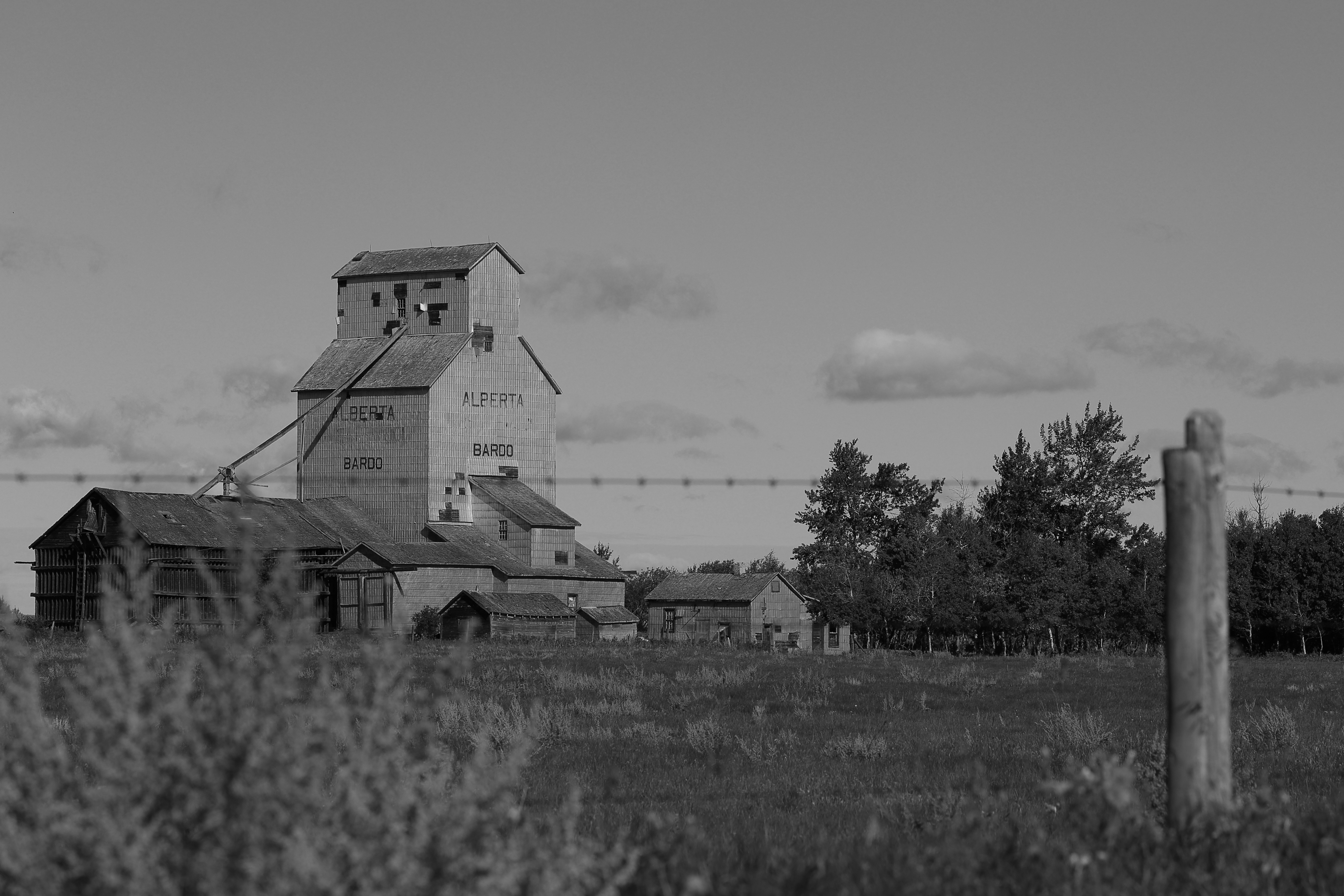
Bardo's disused grain elevator, photographed in 2015.

Passenger railway services to the locality ended in the mid-1960s due to falling demand. Bardo Church burned down again in 1965, again due to a lightning strike; the church subsequently moved to Tofield. By 1969, Bardo's sole remaining "active service", according to Agriculture and Agri-Food Canada, was its Alberta Wheat Pool-operated grain elevator. Bardo received freight rail services to facilitate shipments from the elevator until 1978, when the line was discontinued and its railway tracks removed.

On July 20, 1980, Bardo hosted a reunion for Anderson School, which was attended by over 500 people; of these, 14 were former teachers and 225 were former students. A memorial cairn honouring some of Bardo's earliest settlers was installed near the original townsite in 1989. The Bardo Recreation Association organized a committee in 1993 to compile the history of Bardo for the locality's impending centennial. The finished book, Bardo Centennial History, 1894-1994, was published the next year, featuring forewords from Ed Stelmach and Don Mazankowski.

=== 21st century: 2001–present ===
The Alberta Electric System Operator announced plans in 2015 to increase the transmission capacity of Bardo's substation and its associated transmission lines.

In April 2026, Bardo Recreation Centre received funding from Beaver County to update the building's water and plumbing systems.

== Places of interest ==
As of 2026, Bardo Recreation Centre remains under the management of Bardo Recreation Association. Bardo Cemetery and the Bardo Memorial Cairn can be visited near the original townsite.

== Notable residents ==
- Chester Ronning – teacher and diplomat who lived in Bardo between 1907 and 1913 and attended its school
