= Bawlf =

- Village
- Village of Bawlf
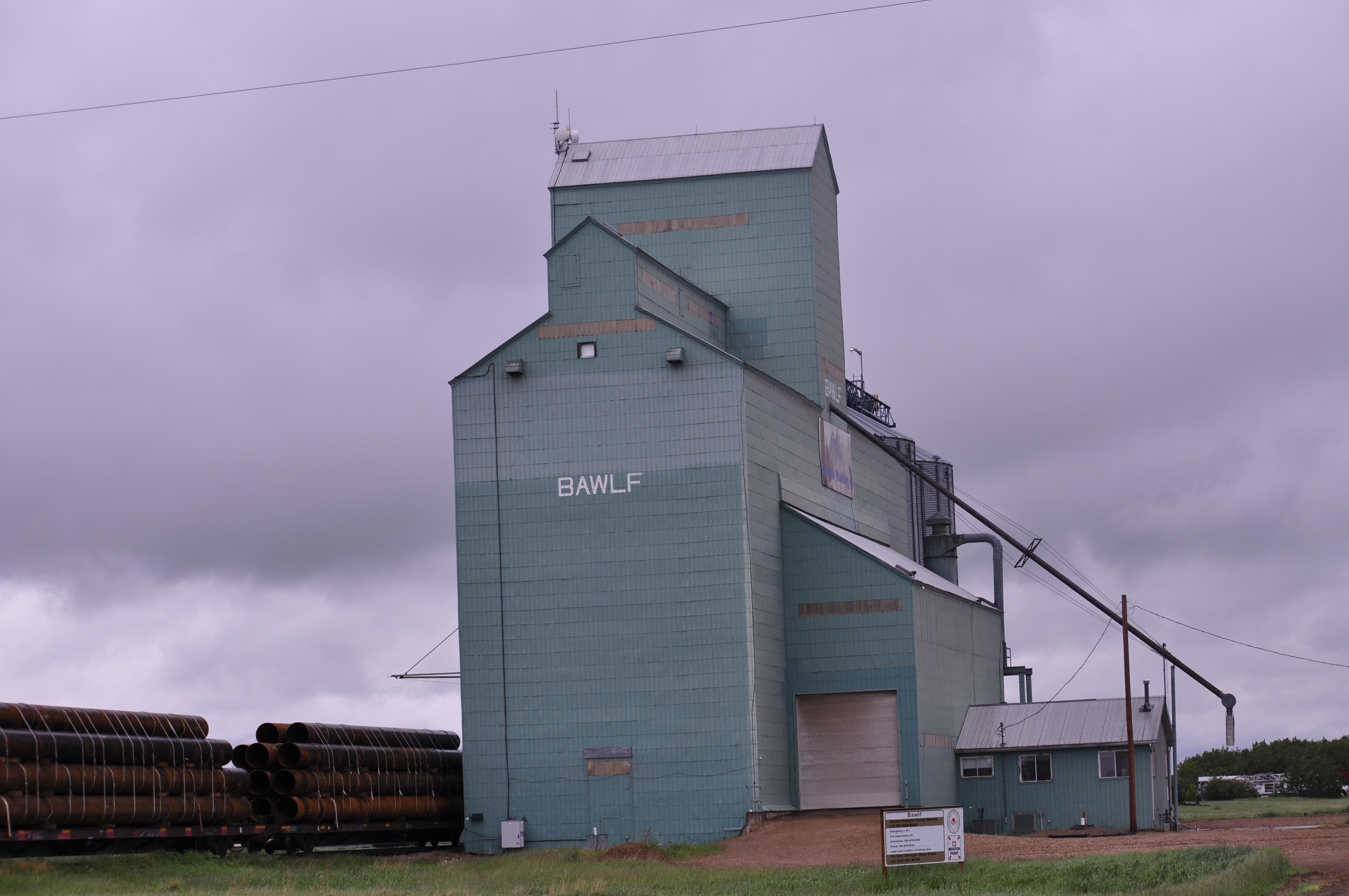
- Bawlf grain elevator on the outskirts of the village along Alberta Highway 13, 2013

- Location within Alberta
- Coordinates: 52°55′03″N 112°27′58″W
- Country: Canada
- Province: Alberta
- Region: Central Alberta
- Census division: 10
- Municipal district: Camrose County
- Founded: 1905
- Incorporated
  - Village: October 12, 1906

Government
  - Mayor: John DeMerchant
  - Governing body: Bawlf Village Council

Area (2021)
  - Land: 0.89 km^{2} (0.34 sq mi)
- Elevation: 708 m (2,323 ft)

Population (2021)
  - Total: 412
  - Density: 462.9/km^{2} (1,199/sq mi)
- Time zone: UTC−06:00 (Alberta Time)
- Highways: Highway 13; Highway 854
- Website: Official website

Bawlf /ˈbɔːlf/ is a village in Alberta, Canada located 25 kilometres (16 mi) east-southeast of Camrose. Founded in 1905 as a stop on the Canadian Pacific Railway line, it was named after Nicholas Bawlf, who was then president of the Winnipeg Grain Exchange.

== History ==
The settlement of Bawlf was a results of the Canadian Pacific Railway's route through the prairies, with the original survey for the community taking place in 1905 on land owned by Gilbert Hansen. The first train to arrive to the community would occur in 1906, and regular passenger and freight service between Edmonton and Winnipeg would begin by 1909. The Village of Bawlf would be incorporated by the Province of Alberta on October 12, 1906, however an overseer would administer the community until 1908 when the first village council was elected. The first elected council consisted of R. H. Anderson, P. O. Paulson, and Edwin C. Hardy. In 1913 a fire would destroy five places of business.

The Village of Bawlf would erect a curling facility in 1937 with a $250 donation from Joe Ohman and $175 loan from the Village Council, the building was surplused by the Town of Camrose, cut up and relocated to Bawlf. A new curling building was constructed in 1955-56 for $8,642 and subsequently rented to the Alberta Wheat Pool for 7 years until it was finally opened for curling in 1962, and later the next year an artificial ice machine was added.

== Geography ==
Nearby communities include Daysland, Rosalind, Ohaton, Kelsey and Camrose.

== Demographics ==
In the 2021 Census of Population conducted by Statistics Canada, the Village of Bawlf had a population of 412 living in 164 of its 176 total private dwellings, a change of −2.4% from its 2016 population of 422. With a land area of 0.89 km^{2} (0.34 sq mi), it had a population density of 462.9/km^{2} (1,199.0/sq mi) in 2021.

In the 2016 Census of Population conducted by Statistics Canada, the Village of Bawlf recorded a population of 422 living in 165 of its 175 total private dwellings, a 4.7% change from its 2011 population of 403. With a land area of 0.89 km^{2} (0.34 sq mi), it had a population density of 474.2/km^{2} (1,228.1/sq mi) in 2016.

== Government ==
The village is served by a five-member council and is administered by a village chief administrative officer.

== Education ==
Bawlf School, located in the village of Bawlf, is a K-12 school that serves a population of approximately 350 students. Students in high school come from Bawlf as well as neighbouring communities, including Round Hill and Rosalind. Bawlf School is well known for its academic and athletic achievements. It has won a number of regional and provincial championships in volleyball, basketball, and other sports. Bawlf School has been ranked among the top schools in Alberta for its high achievement at the high school level, according to the Fraser Institute Report Card on Alberta's High Schools.

== See also ==
- List of communities in Alberta
- List of villages in Alberta
