= Poe, Alberta =

Locality in Alberta, Canada

Poe
- Settlement
- Location of Poe in Alberta
- Coordinates: 53.259444°N 112.333333°W
- Country: Canada
- Province: Alberta
- Region: Central Alberta
- Census division: Division No. 10, Alberta
- County: Beaver County
- Time zone: MDT
- Highways: Alberta Highway 14

Poe is a locality in central Alberta in Beaver County, located on Highway 14, 42 kilometres (26 mi) northeast of Camrose.

== Toponymy ==
Poe is named for American novelist Edgar Allan Poe. Its name derives from a station established by the Grand Trunk Pacific Railway (GTPR) in 1909, as part of a route colloquially known as the "alphabet line". The railway line earned its moniker due to the GTPR's practice of "more or less" naming each station in alphabetical order, repeating the alphabet twice across Alberta. Poe's station came before Ryley, Shonts, and Tofield.

== History ==
=== Founding and early development: 1909–1929 ===
In 1909, the GTPR established a railway station named Poe along its main line between Winnipeg and Edmonton. The Walsh Land Company began selling surrounding land the following year, claiming to have sold 200 lots by July 1910 to a mix of investors and settlers.

A grain elevator was soon installed to serve farms appearing in the area. The settlement also received a post office in 1912, which operated out of a general store, followed by Poe School in 1916.

=== Rest of 20th century: 1930–2000 ===
The arrival of a decade-long drought known as the Dust Bowl in the 1930s effectively curbed Poe's early growth, though it was recognized as a locality for mapping purposes by the Government of Alberta in 1950.

Following steady depopulation in the area, Poe School closed in 1952, and current students were transferred to schools in Holden and Ryley. The building sat dormant until 1955, when a group of locals convened as the Poe Community Club; they purchased the facility for a dollar and converted it into a community centre.

Poe's post office closed permanently in August 1964. In 1972, the Poe Community Club disbanded, and the former Poe School building once again fell into disuse. By 1978, the land that hosted the original Poe townsite was privately owned by one farming operation, though official records continued to use the Poe toponym as a shorthand for the vicinity.

=== 21st century: 2001–present ===
In 2011, the Canadian National Railway (now the owner of the railway connection through Poe) decided to close a temporary access road it had established for the settlement. This road represented the only form of vehicle access to Poe; furthermore, its status as an unofficial road had complicated the ability of emergency services to locate the settlement. Beaver County's council subsequently voted to construct its own road into Poe.

In its 2024 municipal development plan, Beaver County described Poe as a "former community" that the county had recognized as a hamlet "at one time". The plan ruled out allowing any "further [non-agricultural] development" in Poe for the foreseeable future.

== Services ==
The Canadian National Railway tracks through Poe are still in use for freight services as of 2026. A detachment in Tofield provides RCMP services to Poe.

=== Places of interest ===
As of 2023, Poe's disused grain elevator still stands in the original townsite.

== Demographics ==
Poe's population was recorded as 16 by the 1981 Canadian census, and 15 by the 1986 Canadian census.

== Gallery ==
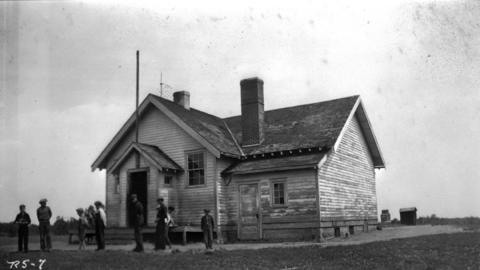
Poe School, shortly after its construction in 1916

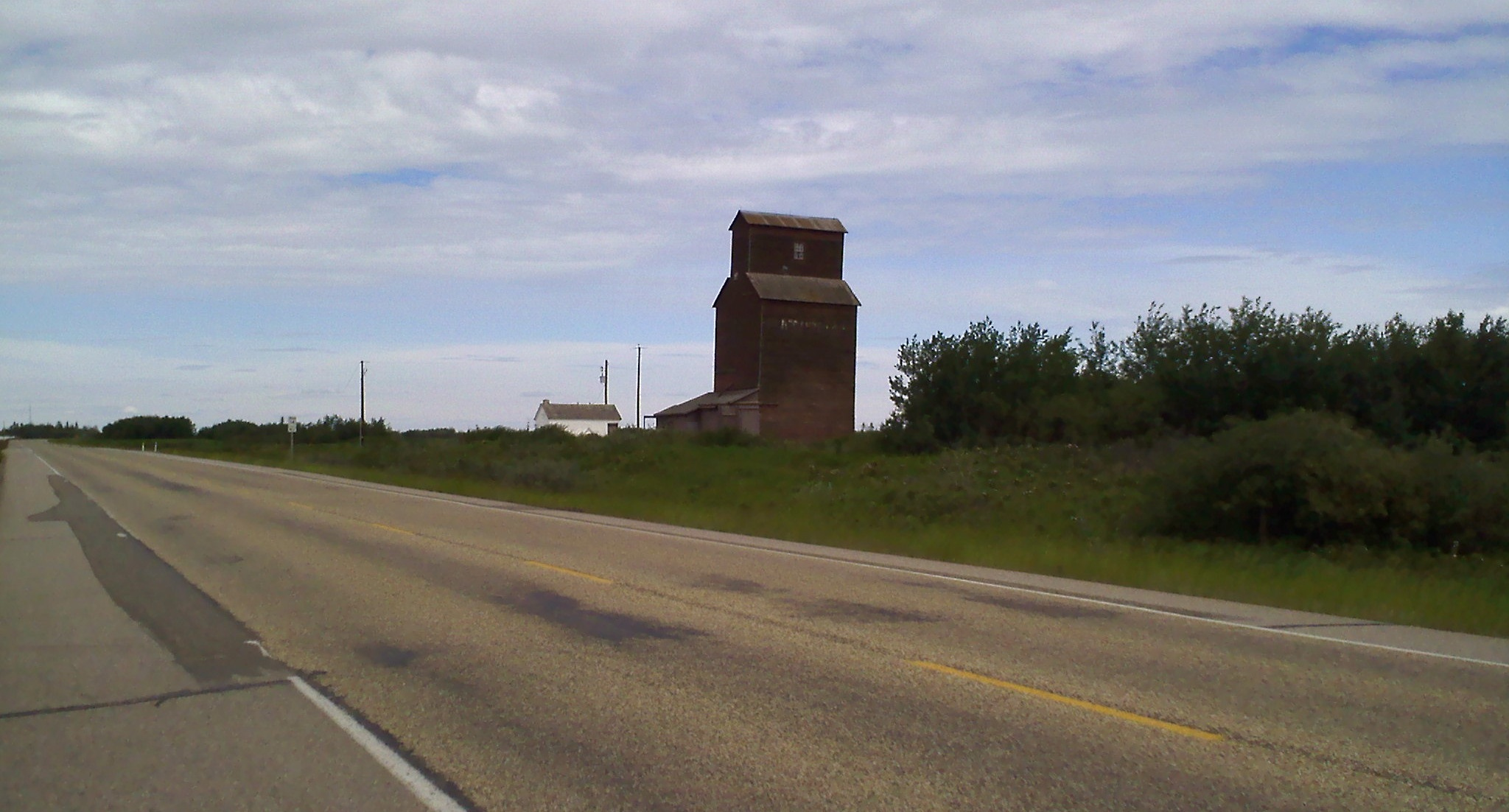
Poe's grain elevator, photographed in 2010

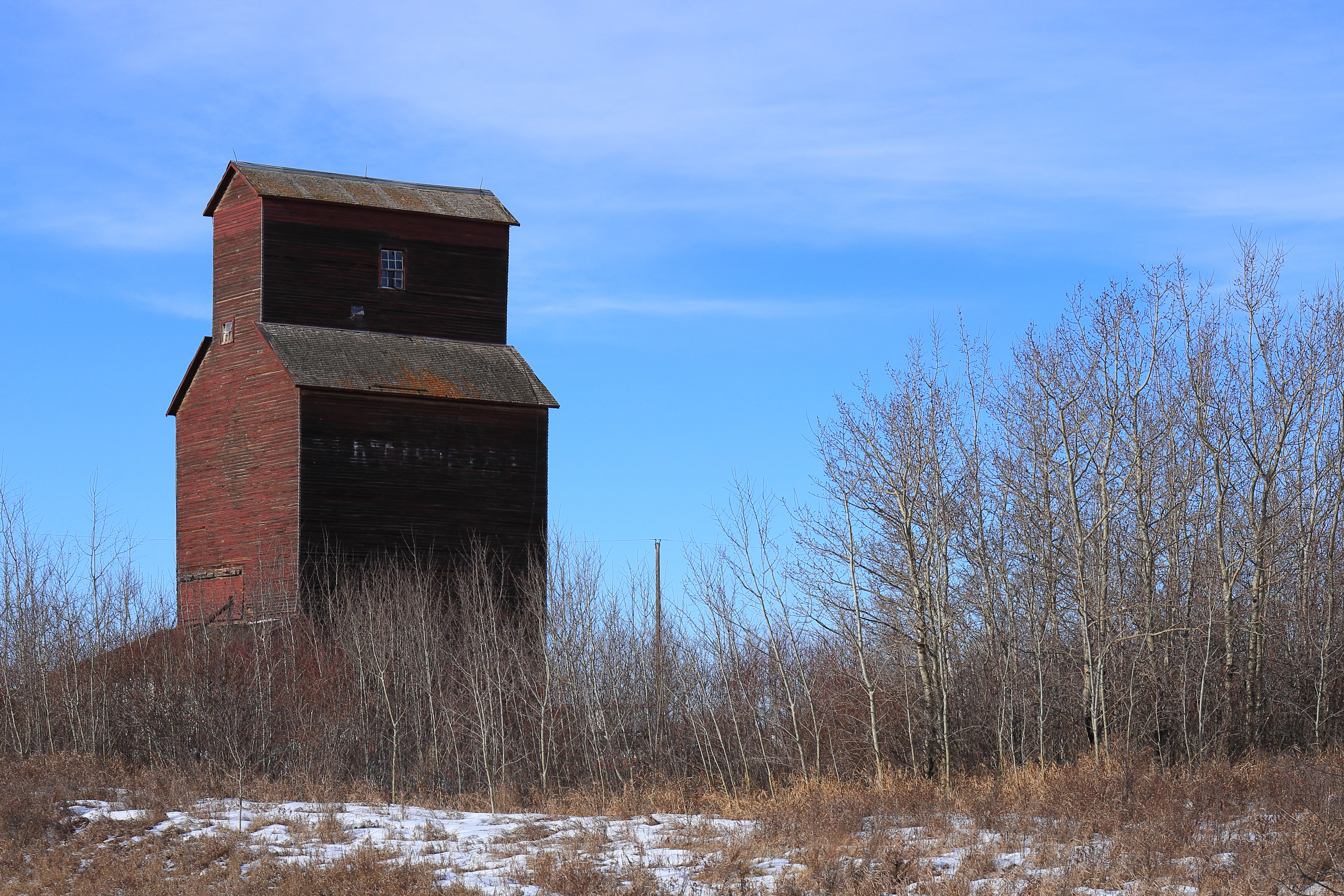
Grain elevator, photographed in 2016
