= Dodds, Alberta =

Dodds
- Settlement
- Location of Dodds in Alberta
- Coordinates: 53°13′50″N 112°32′28″W
- Country: Canada
- Province: Alberta
- Region: Southern Alberta
- Census division: Division No. 2, Alberta
- County: Beaver County
- Time zone: UTC−7 (MST)
  - Summer (DST): UTC−6 (MDT)
- Highways: Alberta Highway 834

Dodds is an unincorporated community in central Alberta in Beaver County, accessible via roads connected to Highway 834. The location of its original site lies 14 km (8.7 mi) from Tofield.

== Toponymy ==
Dodds is named for Dodds Lake, a lake in Red Deer County. The lake itself was named for John Dodd, an early homesteader who settled in Alberta around the year 1887.

== History ==
=== Founding: 1900–1919 ===
Permanent settlement began in the Dodds area in the early 20th century. Coal was discovered in the area shortly before 1908, when the Dodds Coal Mine was founded. The next year, Standard School was built to serve the growing community, and the Canadian Northern Railway established a Dodds railway siding.

In the decades following the introduction of rail connections, Dodds received a general store, a blacksmith, and a cobbler. The first iteration of a Dodds post office operated between October 1913 and May 1918.

=== Rest of the 20th century: 1920–2000 ===
Although Dodds' primarily agrarian economy suffered during the 1920s (and the subsequent Dust Bowl of the 1930s), the decade also saw the introduction of new coal mining operations, including Black Nugget Mine. The industry's expansion brought an influx of workers and job openings to Dodds. A second iteration of a Dodds post office opened in May 1927, and the settlement received two grain elevators by the end of the decade.

By the early 1950s, however, demand for coal had begun to fall in favour of oil and gas. The Standard School closed in 1955, and its building was transferred to Ryley to become part of the school complex there. After a fire in 1955 wrought $80,000 in damages to Black Nugget Mine, the operation closed in 1956. It was converted into a public park and campsite, Black Nugget Lake Campground, by Beaver County.

Passenger rail services to Dodds ended in the early 1960s. Dodds' post office closed for the second and final time in September 1965; by 1969, active commercial services in Dodds consisted of two grain elevators.

In mid-1974, Calgary Power announced plans to introduce a coal-fired power plant between Dodds and Round Hill. Fearing that the plant would pollute water and agricultural land in the area, farmers organized into the Round Hill-Dodds Agriculture Protective Association and lobbied the provincial government to reject Calgary Power's proposal. Some residents who believed the project would bring jobs to the area formed a competing Shaw Community Association. The provincial government ultimately rejected Calgary Power's proposal in July 1976.

Both of Dodds' grain elevators closed in March 1981.

=== 21st century: 2001–present ===
The Dodds Coal Mine "ran dry" in the 2000s, prompting the operation to expand. The original mine was converted into a golf course, Coal Creek Golf Resort, in 2012.

In its 2024 municipal plan, Beaver County described Dodds as a "former community" that had previously been recognized as a hamlet. The plan further stipulated that no new non-agricultural developments would be permitted in Dodds for the foreseeable future.

== Services and amenities ==
=== Commercial activities ===
As of 2026, Dodds Coal Mine remains operational.

=== Recreation ===
Coal Creek Golf Resort, which also runs an RV park, stands on the site of the original Dodds Coal Mine. A campsite, Buzzard Gulch Campground, also operates near Dodds. Black Nugget Lake Park contains a camp site as well, alongside Black Nugget Lake Observatory.

== In media ==
- The Round Hill-Dodds Agriculture Protective Association's efforts to prevent the installation of a power plant near Dodds in the 1970s inspired a play by Rudy Wiebe and Paul Thompson, Far As the Eye Can See (1971).

== Notable residents ==
- Dorothy Roberts (1916–2010), nurse and the first woman to be elected to Westlock Town Council; Roberts served one term between October 1971 and September 1974
