= Alberta Highway 834 =

Highway in Alberta, Canada

Highway 834
- Highway 834 highlighted in red and Highway 834A highlighted in blue
- Highway 834

Route information
- Maintained by the Ministry of Transportation and Economic Corridors
- Length: 77.1 km (47.9 mi)

Major junctions
- South end: Highway 26 near Camrose
- Highway 14 near Tofield; Highway 16 (TCH) near Elk Island National Park
- North end: Highway 15 at Chipman

Location
- Country: Canada
- Province: Alberta
- Specialized and rural municipalities: Camrose County, Beaver County, Lamont County
- Towns: Tofield

Highway system
- Alberta Numbered Highway Network; List; Former
← Highway 833	→ Highway 835

Highway 834 is a 77-kilometre-long (48 mi) highway in the province of Alberta, Canada. It runs north–south from Highway 26, 15 kilometres (9.3 mi) east of Camrose to Highway 15 at Chipman. The highway is largely rural and passes through Camrose County, Beaver County, and Lamont County.

== History ==
Highway 834 was established in the mid-1970s as part of the establishment of Alberta's Secondary Highway system. In the mid-1990s, it was extended south when a 4.2-kilometre (2.6 mi) section of Range Road 194 was upgraded between Highway 26 and the Highway 13/Highway 56 intersection; a 5.2-kilometre (3.2 mi) concurrency with Highway 26 was established to link it to the pre-existing route.

When Highway 834 was first established, it followed a 3.5-kilometre (2.2 mi) concurrency with Highway 14 before passing through Tofield along its town streets. In 2021, a bypass was completed around Tofield, realigning Highway 834 away from town streets and eliminating the Highway 14 concurrency.

In September 2021, the southern-most 4.2-kilometre (2.6 mi) section of Highway 834 was renumbered to Highway 56, extending its northern terminus from Highway 13 to Highway 26. The renumbering was a response to local requests to align the numbering of the short portion of highway with the pre-existing portions of Highway 56. It also rendered the Highway 26 concurrency obsolete and moved its southern terminus back to its original location.

A 15-kilometre (9 mi) section of present-day Highway 834 south of Chipman was once part of the Highway 16 alignment. Prior to 1940, Highway 16 headed east from Edmonton via Fort Saskatchewan and Lamont before continuing eastward, while Highway 15 headed due east from Edmonton through Elk Island National Park, with the two routes meeting south of Chipman. In c. 1940, the Highway 15 and Highway 16 designations were switched east of Edmonton, and Highway 16 assumed the more direct easterly route, and Highway 15 travelled through Chipman, resulting in the 15-kilometre (9 mi) section becoming part of Highway 15. In the mid-1950s, Highway 15 was realigned to follow the railway in a southeasterly direction from Chipman to Mundare.

== Major intersections ==
Rural/specialized municipality	Location	km	mi	Destinations	Notes
Camrose County		−9.4	−5.8	Highway 56 south – Stettler Highway 13 – Camrose, Provost	Former southern terminus; present-day Highway 56
Camrose County		−5.2	−3.2	Highway 26 west – Camrose	Former south end of Highway 26 concurrency; present-day Highway 56 northern terminus
Camrose County		0.0	0.0	Highway 26 east – Viking	Southern terminus; former north end of Highway 26 concurrency
Camrose County	Round Hill	16.1	10.0	Township Road 484	
Camrose–Beaver county line		19.4	12.1	Highway 617 west – Kingman, Hay Lakes	
Beaver County		37.8	23.5	Highway 14 – Edmonton, Wainwright	Highway 834 formerly followed Highway 14 west
Beaver County	Tofield	38.8	24.1	Highway 626 (Rowan's Route)	
Beaver County	Tofield	41.8	26.0	Highway 834A south (51 Street)	Original Highway 834 alignment
Lamont County		61.8	38.4	Highway 16 (TCH/YH) – Edmonton, Lloydminster	
Lamont County	Chipman	77.1	47.9	Highway 15 – Fort Saskatchewan, Edmonton, Mundare	Northern terminus
1.000 mi = 1.609 km; 1.000 km = 0.621 mi: Closed/former

== Highway 834A ==
Highway 834A
- Location: Tofield
- Length: 4.0 km (2.5 mi)
- Existed: 2021–present

Highway 834A is a 4.0-kilometre (2.5 mi) unsigned highway and former alignment of Highway 834 through Tofield, Alberta. It begins at Highway 14 and follows 51 Street, Rowan's Route (51 Avenue), and 51 Street before ending at Highway 834 north of town. Established in 2021 when Highway 834 was moved to the Tofield Bypass, it is the only suffixed route in the 500–986 series (secondary highways) in Alberta.

Major intersections

Location	km	mi	Destinations	Notes
Tofield	0.0	0.0	Highway 14 – Edmonton, Wainwright	Southern terminus; Highway 834A follows 51 Street
Tofield	0.4	0.25	Rowan's Route (51 Avenue)	Highway 834A follows Rowan's Route
Tofield	1.3	0.81	Highway 626 east (Rowan's Route) to Highway 834	Highway 834A follows 51 Street
Beaver County	4.0	2.5	Highway 834 – Chipman, Round Hill	Northern terminus
1.000 mi = 1.609 km; 1.000 km = 0.621 mi
