= Bawlf (disambiguation) =

Bawlf is a village in Alberta, Canada.

Bawlf may also refer to:

- Bawlf (Blackwells) Airport, Alberta, Canada
- Billy Bawlf (1881–1972), Canadian ice hockey player
- Nicholas Bawlf (1849–1914), a figure in the Canadian grain trade
- Nick Bawlf (1884–1947), Canadian ice hockey player
