= Kelsey, Alberta =

Canadian hamlet, founded 1902

Kelsey
- Hamlet
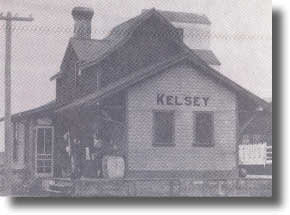
- Kelsey Station

- Location of Kelsey Kelsey (Canada)
- Coordinates: 52.846°N 112.549°W
- Country: Canada
- Province: Alberta
- Region: Central Alberta
- Census division: 10
- Municipal district: Camrose County
- Established: 1902

Government
  - Type: Unincorporated
  - Governing body: Camrose County Council

Area (2021)
  - Land: 0.45 km^{2} (0.17 sq mi)

Population (2021)
  - Total: 15
  - Density: 33.1/km^{2} (86/sq mi)
- Time zone: UTC−06:00 (Alberta Time)
- Area codes: 780, 587, 825

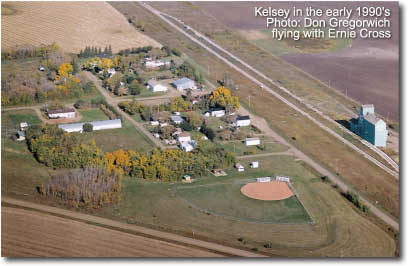
Aerial view

Kelsey is a hamlet in central Alberta, Canada within Camrose County. It is located off Highway 850, approximately 125 kilometres (78 mi) southeast of Edmonton and 30 kilometres (19 mi) southeast of Camrose, Kelsey's closest major trading centre.

Kelsey is home to several local businesses, a community hall, and a post office. Both school and fire services are provided by the nearby villages of Rosalind and Bawlf.

== History ==
In 1902, Mr. and Mrs. Moses Kelsey and their son Earl, arrived in the area from Milbank, South Dakota, and filed on the S.E. 4–45–18. The southeast corner of this quarter of land was later chosen as the site for the community. Milton Zimmerman settled in the area in the same year and suggested the community be named after Kelsey.

In 1915, the Canadian National Railway began laying steel in a south-easterly direction from Camrose. It passed through what a few weeks later became the town of Kelsey. This stretch of railroad is noted for being the longest stretch of straight railway in North America... "if not in the world," some people add.

In 1916, a station house was built in Kelsey and Charlie Cooper, with his wife Anne and family, took up residence in it. The first grain elevator, and two stores were also constructed in the growing town.

By 1920 telephone service had been installed in the Kelsey district and the next few years saw the Kelsey Union Church, a dance hall, and a one-room school.

The first power line to reach Kelsey was constructed in 1951.

== Demographics ==
In the 2021 Census of Population conducted by Statistics Canada, Kelsey had a population of 15 living in 8 of its 9 total private dwellings, a change of 0% from its 2016 population of 15. With a land area of 0.45 km^{2} (0.17 sq mi), it had a population density of 33.3/km^{2} (86.3/sq mi) in 2021.

As a designated place in the 2016 Census of Population conducted by Statistics Canada, Kelsey had a population of 15 living in 7 of its 7 total private dwellings, a change of 0% from its 2011 population of 15. With a land area of 0.45 km^{2} (0.17 sq mi), it had a population density of 33.3/km^{2} (86.3/sq mi) in 2016.

== See also ==
- List of communities in Alberta
- List of designated places in Alberta
- List of hamlets in Alberta
