= Aspen Estates, Alberta =

Aspen Estates, Alberta may refer to:

- Aspen Estates, Beaver County, Alberta, a locality in Beaver County, Alberta
- Aspen Estates, Parkland County, Alberta, a locality in Parkland County, Alberta
