= Pelican Point, Alberta =

Pelican Point
- Hamlet
- Location of Pelican Point Pelican Point (Canada)
- Coordinates: 52°31′25″N 112°49′52″W
- Country: Canada
- Province: Alberta
- Region: Central Alberta
- Census division: 10
- Municipal district: Camrose County

Government
  - Type: Unincorporated
  - Governing body: Camrose County Council

Area (2021)
  - Land: 0.94 km^{2} (0.36 sq mi)

Population (2021)
  - Total: 117
  - Density: 124.6/km^{2} (323/sq mi)
- Time zone: UTC−06:00 (Alberta Time)
- Area codes: 780, 587, 825

Pelican Point is a hamlet in central Alberta, Canada within Camrose County. It is located approximately 6 kilometres (3.7 mi) south of Highway 53 and 55 kilometres (34 mi) south of Camrose.

== Demographics ==
In the 2021 Census of Population conducted by Statistics Canada, Pelican Point had a population of 117 living in 64 of its 148 total private dwellings, a change of 15.8% from its 2016 population of 101. With a land area of 0.94 km^{2} (0.36 sq mi), it had a population density of 124.5/km^{2} (322.4/sq mi) in 2021.

As a designated place in the 2016 Census of Population conducted by Statistics Canada, Pelican Point had a population of 101 living in 49 of its 122 total private dwellings, a change of 3.1% from its 2011 population of 98. With a land area of 1.01 km^{2} (0.39 sq mi), it had a population density of 100.0/km^{2} (259.0/sq mi) in 2016.

== See also ==
- List of communities in Alberta
- List of hamlets in Alberta
