= Armena =

- Hamlet
- Location of Armena in Alberta
- Coordinates: 53.1225°N 112.9489°W
- Country: Canada
- Province: Alberta
- Census division: No. 10
- Municipal district: Camrose County

Government
  - Type: Unincorporated
  - Governing body: Camrose County Council

Area (2021)
  - Land: 0.7 km^{2} (0.27 sq mi)
- Elevation: 745 m (2,444 ft)

Population (2021)
  - Total: 37
  - Density: 53.2/km^{2} (138/sq mi)
- Time zone: UTC−06:00 (Alberta Time)
- Website: Hamlet of Armena

Armena is a hamlet in Alberta, Canada within Camrose County. It is located approximately 21 kilometres (13 mi) northwest of Camrose along Highway 21 and has an elevation of 745 metres (2,444 ft). The hamlet is located in Census Division No. 10 and in the federal riding of Crowfoot.

== Toponymy ==
Armena was originally named Tordenskjold, in honour of Norwegian sailor Peter Tordenskjold, by the primarily Norwegian settlers who established the settlement in the 1890s.

In 1911 (sometimes recorded as 1915), the Canadian Northern Railway (CNR) began constructing a track through the settlement, which was still named Tordenskjold by locals. Some residents felt Tordenskjold was too difficult to pronounce, and asked CNR to decide upon a different name. The settlement (and associated railway stop) was subsequently renamed to Armena, though it is unknown how the name was created.

== History ==
=== Early settlers: 1872–1896 ===
In 1872 the Canadian government instituted the Dominion Lands Act, offering arable land to European immigrants who were willing to establish farms. Between the Act's passage and 1893, a small number of homesteads were founded in the area now known as Armena.

In May 1894 Norwegian farmers Thore Grue and Ole Movald relocated to the area with their families. Settlers that followed throughout the rest of the 1890s were of primarily Scandinavian descent.

=== Construction of school and churches: 1897–1910 ===
By 1897 the settlement had grown through the arrival of large families with many children. Grue and his wife Beret had seven of their own. He and Movald therefore enlisted their neighbours to build a school. Residents hauled logs from a nearby lake to Grue's sawmill, for conversion into furniture and building materials.

Armena's first schoolhouse, built over the spring of 1898, welcomed an inaugural class of 29 students ranging in age from seven to seventeen. The building was also used for worship activities by a congregation of Norwegian Lutherans, which Grue organized and gave the named "Scandia." Two more schools were built afterwards, one in 1905 by the Lyseng family and one in 1912 by the Busk family.

The hamlet expanded in 1901 and 1902 with the arrival of families from North Dakota, Minnesota and South Dakota. Between 1903 and 1907, these families built two churches: a Swedish Lutheran church five kilometres east of Armena, and a free church just under one kilometre to the south. In 1908, the Norwegian Lutherans in Armena joined the congregation of the free church, and its building was moved north of Armena. Grue served as the congregation's choir leader for many years. This church, retaining the name "Scandia," remains active as of 2025.

=== Introduction of rail, change of name, and commercial development: 1911–1959 ===
In 1911 (sometimes recorded as 1915), the Canadian Northern Railway built a track through the settlement, as part of the Calgary-Edmonton route. The introduction of rail brought commercial activity to Armena. A grain elevator was built by United Grain Elevators (UCG) in 1914, followed by two more in 1927 and 1928. The UCG elevator caught fire in 1935 and, despite the intervention of Camrose's fire department, could not be salvaged; another elevator was built in its place. Armena's first general store opened in 1915. An Armena post office opened in 1917, attached to the store, that remained in operation until 1953. In 1922, this store also burned down, though it was replaced the year after.

In the 1930s, as was customary at the time, Armena's residents operated a 'fence link' telephone service. Named a 'farmers' telephone company,' these networks allowed residents to communicate with each other, absent a central switchboard, using barbed-wire fences around their properties. These services ended after Western Canada was electrified in the 1940s.

On July 26, 1939, politician William Duncan Herridge delivered a speech in Armena at a picnic held by the Alberta Social Credit Party, marking his first public appearance in Alberta. The purpose of his visit was to promote his newly-launched federal New Democracy party, and to affirm an allegiance with Alberta Social Credit. Premier William Aberhart accompanied Herridge.

Armena's schools were consolidated into one central facility in 1941. The Scandia Lutheran church suffered fire damage in May 1955, but the building had been restored by April 1958.

==== Departure and death of Thore Grue: 1927–1932 ====
In 1927 Thore and Beret Grue, who had been integral to Armena's establishment, moved to Whitecourt to operate a farm. They remained congregants of the Scandia Church, celebrating their golden wedding anniversary there on February 16, 1931. In 1932, they decided to retire and move to Edmonton to live with some of their adult children. Two weeks prior to their departure, Thore experienced influenza symptoms, though he seemed in better health when they boarded the train on December 23, 1932. He began feeling unwell during the rail journey and, upon reaching the platform in Edmonton, collapsed and died. 300 ancestors and relatives of Thore and Beret Grue, including nine descendants born in Norway, attended a reunion in Armena in July 1994.

==== Second World War: 1939–1945 ====
Throughout the Second World War, several residents of Armena enlisted to fight for Canada; some were killed in active service or declared missing in action.

==== Discovery of oil: 1951 ====
The discovery of oil in Alberta in the late 1940s began an oil boom in the province. Western Homestead Oils Limited initiated the introduction of exploratory wells to Armena in January 1951, and discovered oil in October of that year. By September 1952, the Armena oil field was producing over 3,000 barrels daily.

=== Regional development: 1960–present ===
Although Alberta's urban settlements enjoyed electricity by the twentieth century, rural areas were slower to be added to the grid. Armena received electricity service for the first time in 1956, when Calgary Power (today TransAlta) built infrastructure in the area. The Armena School District was absorbed by Battle River School Division in 1975. The local school was closed, and students began attending the school in Hay Lakes from the 1975–76 academic year onwards.

Armena was officially declared a hamlet in 1980. Rail passenger service to the area ended in 1985. The track remains in use by the Canadian National Railway for freight as of 2025. Also as of 2025, Armena hosts an athletic association and recreation board that operate a skating rink and baseball field. The area is a popular location for winter sports.

== Demographics ==
Population history of Armena
Year	Pop.	±%
1966	35	—
1971	55	+57.1%
1976	43	−21.8%
1981	36	−16.3%
1986	47	+30.6%
1991	50	+6.4%
1996	48	−4.0%
2001	35	−27.1%
2006	50	+42.9%
2011	47	−6.0%
2016	42	−10.6%
2021	37	−11.9%
Source: Statistics Canada

As a designated place in the 2016 Census of Population conducted by Statistics Canada, Armena had a population of 42 living in 16 of its 16 total private dwellings, a change of −10.6% from its 2011 population of 47. With a land area of 0.7 km^{2} (0.27 sq mi), it had a population density of 60.0/km^{2} (155.4/sq mi) in 2016.

In the 2021 Census of Population conducted by Statistics Canada, Armena had a population of 37 living in 17 of its 18 total private dwellings, a change of −11.9% from its 2016 population of 42. With a land area of 0.7 km^{2} (0.27 sq mi), it had a population density of 52.9/km^{2} (136.9/sq mi) in 2021.

As of 2024 Armena contains over 40 residential lots, and is home to just under 50 people.

== See also ==
- List of communities in Alberta
- List of designated places in Alberta
- List of hamlets in Alberta
