= Olivia Lake (Alberta) =

Lake in Alberta, Canada

- Location within Alberta
- Location: Beaver County, Alberta
- Coordinates: 53.077°N 111.597°W
- Basin countries: Canada
- Max. length: 0.5 km (0.31 mi)
- Max. width: 1.2 km (0.75 mi)
- Surface area: 52 ha (130 acres)
- Average depth: 1.3 m (4 ft 3 in)
- Max. depth: 1.7 m (5 ft 7 in)
- Surface elevation: 677 m (2,221 ft)
- References: Olivia Lake

Olivia Lake is a lake in Alberta. Due to evaporation and not enough replenishment of water, the lake is two to three times more saline than seawater.
