= Winnipeg Grain Exchange =

The Winnipeg Grain Exchange (Known too as ICE Futures Canada) was established in 1887, and dissolved in 1986.It was also the predecessor of the Winnipeg Commodity Exchange.

== List of presidents ==
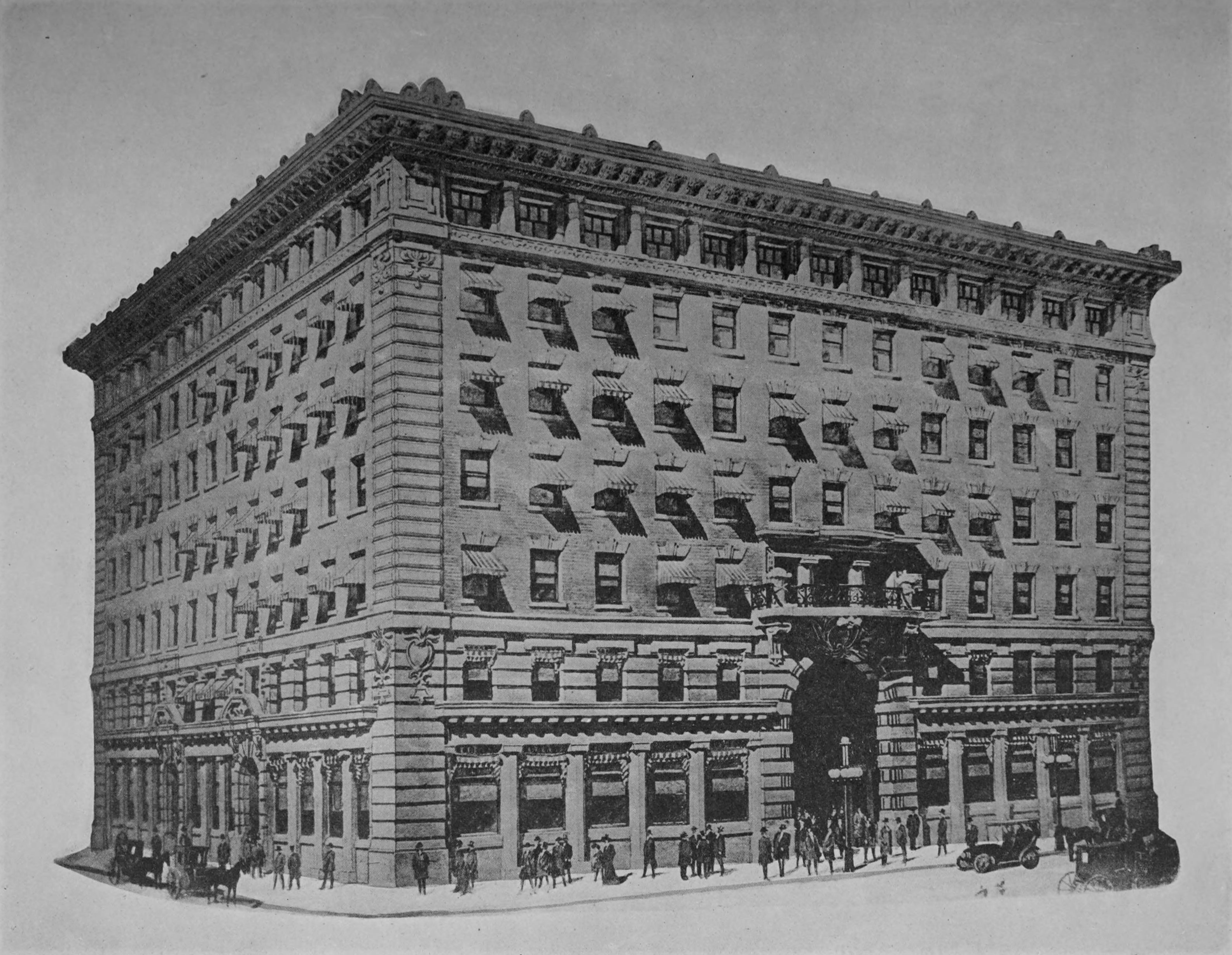
The 1906 Grain Exchange Building, designed by Darling and Pearson

- 1887–1888, Daniel Hunter McMillan
- 1888–1889, Samuel Spink
- 1889–1890, Nicholas Bawlf
- 1890–1891, Frederick William Thompson
- 1891–1892, James Alexander Mitchell
- 1893–1893, Arthur Atkinson
- 1893–1894, Samuel Alexander McGaw
- 1894–1895, George Reading Crowe
- 1895–1896, Stephen Nairn
- 1896–1897, Nicholas Bawlf
- 1897–1898, Robert Muir
- 1898–1899, Joseph Harris
- 1899–1900, William Linton Parrish
- 1900–1901, William Martin
- 1901–1902, Charles Alexander Young
- 1902–1903, Frederick Phillipps
- 1903–1904, Alexander Ross Hargraft
- 1904–1905, John Love
- 1905–1906, Isaac Capel Tilt
- 1906–1907, William J. Bettingen
- 1907–1908, John Fleming
- 1908–1909, Hugh Northcote Baird
- 1909–1910, George Fisher
- 1910–1911, Archibald Dickson Chisholm
- 1911–1912, Donald Morrison
- 1912–1913, Andrew Kelly
- 1913–1914, Alvin K. Godfrey
- 1914–1915, Sidney Thomas Smith
- 1915–1916, William Edwin Milner
- 1916–1917, John C. Gage
- 1917–1918, William Richard Bawlf
- 1918–1919, Frederick J. Anderson
- 1919–1920, John Esterbrooke Botterell
- 1920–1921, Norman Lawrence Leach
- 1921–1922, C. H. Leaman
- 1922–1923, John Bremner Craig
- 1923–1924, James Armstrong Richardson
- 1924–1925, C. C. Fields
- 1925–1926, D. C. MacLachlan
- 1926–1927, A. Thomson
- 1927–1928, Elbert Walter Kneeland
- 1928–1929, James Alexander Crowe
- 1929–1930, William Arthur Murphy
- 1930–1931, A. P. White
- 1931–1932, C. E. Hayles
- 1932–1933, Sidney Thomas Smith
- 1933–1934, Henry Eugene Sellers
- 1934–1935, Roy W. Milner
- 1935–1936, Rupert Cambourne Reece
- 1936–1937, William Johnstone Dowler
- 1937–1938, H. Gauer
- 1938–1939, J. W. Horn
- 1939–1941, George S. Mathieson
- 1941–1942, S. A. Searle
- 1942–1943, K. A. Powell
- 1943–1944, A. Christie
