= Ohaton =

- Hamlet
- Location of Ohaton in Alberta
- Coordinates: 52°58′10″N 112°39′33″W
- Country: Canada
- Province: Alberta
- Region: Central Alberta
- Census division: 10
- Municipal district: Camrose County
- Settled: September 1906
- Dissolved: January 1, 1946

Government
  - Type: Unincorporated
  - Governing body: Camrose County Council
  - MP: Pierre Poilievre
  - MLA: Jackie Lovely

Area (2021)
  - Land: 0.13 km^{2} (0.050 sq mi)
- Elevation: 770 m (2,530 ft)

Population (2021)
  - Total: 133
  - Density: 1,024.7/km^{2} (2,654/sq mi)
- Time zone: UTC−06:00 (Alberta Time)
- Area code: 780
- Highways: Highway 13

Ohaton is a hamlet in central Alberta, Canada within Camrose County. Previously an incorporated municipality, Ohaton dissolved from village status on January 1, 1946.

Ohaton is located approximately 15 kilometres (9.3 mi) east of the City of Camrose. The Ohaton post office was opened in 1906 with the name "Ohaton" being a portmanteau of the partners Osler, Hammond and Nanton of a notable Winnipeg financial firm. Nanton, another community in Alberta, is also named for Augustus Meredith Nanton of the same firm.

Ohaton and area's topography is rounded hills with a small river valley running through its southern portion. The surrounding area is mostly farmed with grain and canola or ranched with predominantly cattle.

== Demographics ==
In the 2021 Census of Population conducted by Statistics Canada, Ohaton had a population of 133 living in 61 of its 64 total private dwellings, a change of 3.9% from its 2016 population of 128. With a land area of 0.13 km^{2} (0.050 sq mi), it had a population density of 1,023.1/km^{2} (2,649.8/sq mi) in 2021.

As a designated place in the 2016 Census of Population conducted by Statistics Canada, Ohaton had a population of 110 living in 50 of its 55 total private dwellings, a change of −8.3% from its 2011 population of 120. With a land area of 0.24 km^{2} (0.093 sq mi), it had a population density of 458.3/km^{2} (1,187.1/sq mi) in 2016.

== See also ==
- List of communities in Alberta
- List of designated places in Alberta
- List of former urban municipalities in Alberta
- List of hamlets in Alberta
