= Beaverhill Lake =

Lake in central Alberta, Canada

- amisk-wa-chi-sakhahigan (Cree)
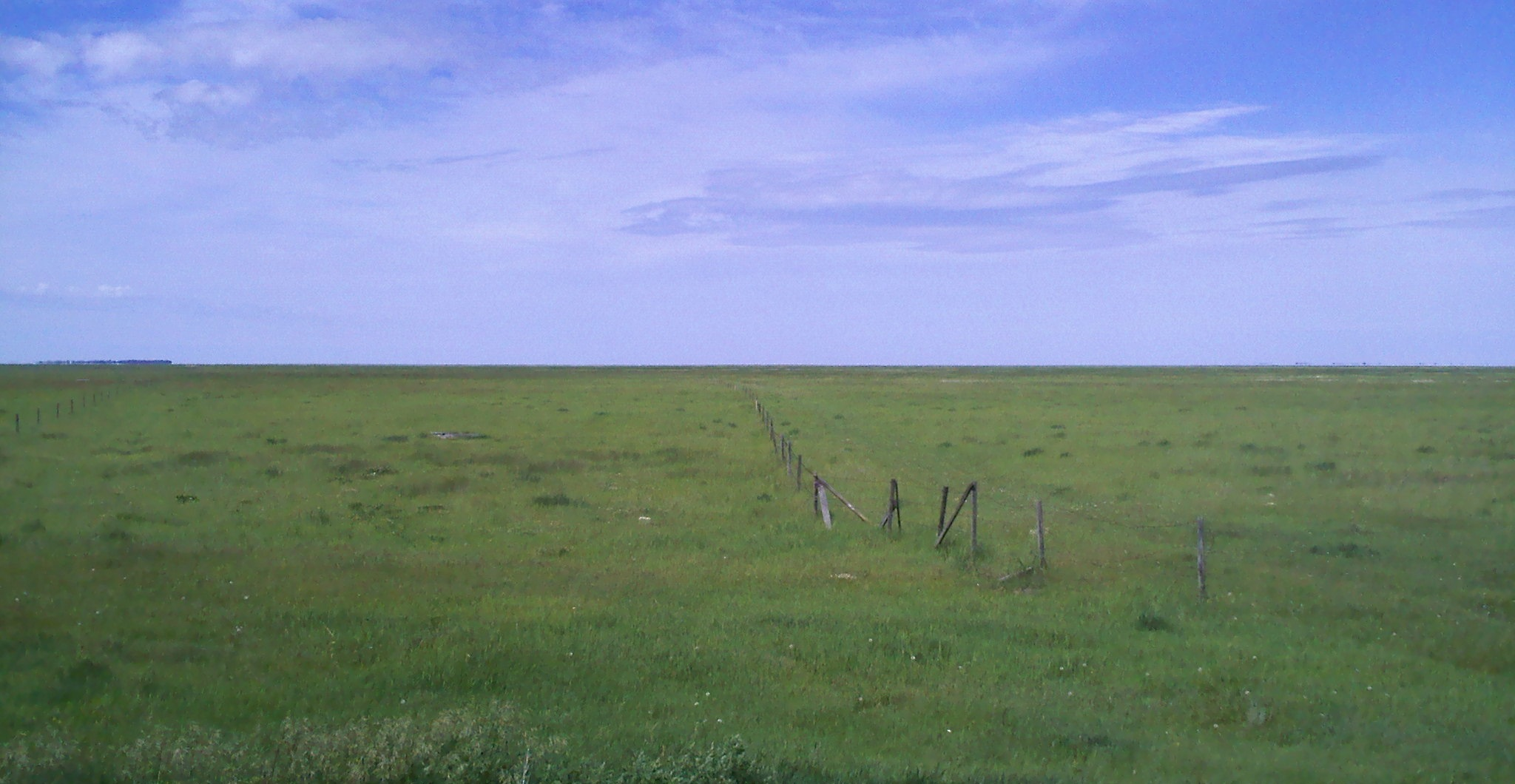
- Beaverhill Lake from Francis Viewpoint in 2010

- Location within Alberta
- Location: Beaver County / Lamont County, Alberta
- Coordinates: 53°27′09″N 112°32′08″W
- Catchment area: 1,970 km^{2} (760 sq mi)
- Basin countries: Canada
- Surface area: 139 km^{2} (54 sq mi)
- Max. depth: 2.3 m (7 ft 7 in)
- Surface elevation: 668 m (2,192 ft)

Ramsar Wetland
- Official name: Beaverhill Lake
- Designated: May 27, 1987
- Reference no.: 370

Beaverhill Lake (Cree: amisk-wa-chi-sakhahigan) is a large lake in central Alberta, Canada. It is a site of regional importance in the Western Hemisphere Shorebird Reserve Network. It is managed by the Canadian Wildlife Service division of Environment Canada.

It is located 70 km southeast of Edmonton, near the town of Tofield, and lies in the hydrographic basin of the North Saskatchewan River. As recently as 1990, the lake had a total area of 139 km^{2} (54 sq mi) and a maximum depth of only 2.3 m (7 ft 7 in) Like similar "prairie pothole" lakes, Beaverhill lake receded significantly after much of its headwaters were diverted; between 1999 and 2009, it lost about one-quarter of its depth.

The lake is an important bird habitat and has been designated as a "National Nature Viewpoint" by Nature Canada (formerly known as the Canadian Nature Federation) in 1981. The Beaverhill Natural Area was established in 1987 to protect the lake and its surrounding area. Beaverhill Lake Heritage Rangeland Natural Area is also established on what were the shores of the lake.

The Beaverhill Lake Group, a stratigraphical unit of the Western Canadian Sedimentary Basin was named for this lake.
