= Alberta Pacific Grain Company =

- Industry: Agriculture
- Founded: 1900
- Defunct: 1967
- Fate: Merged
- Successor: Federal Grain
- Headquarters: Alberta, Canada
- Products: Grain buying

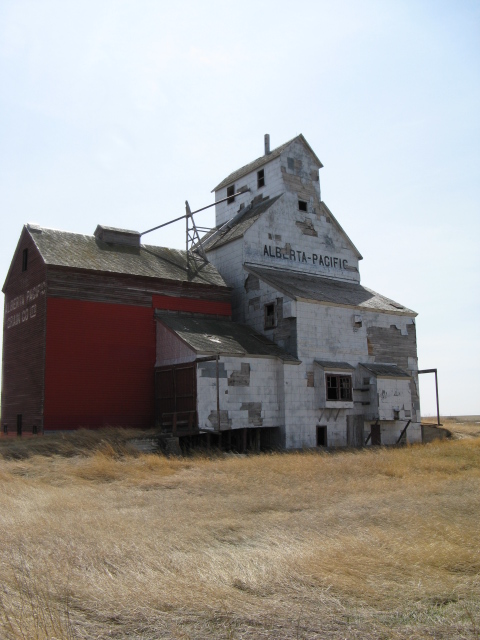
The oldest standing grain elevator in Alberta, the Alberta Pacific elevator in Raley.

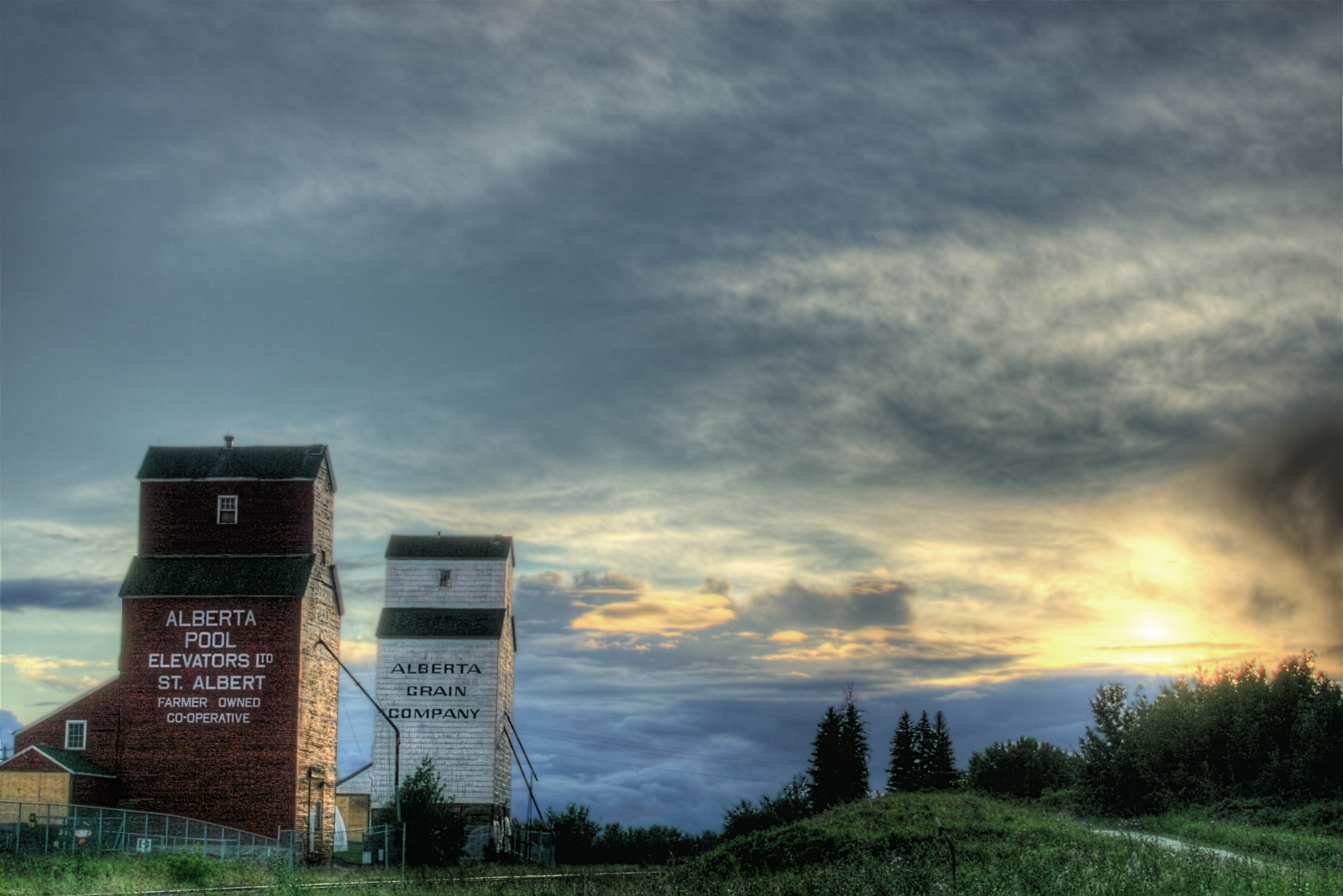
The historic elevators in St. Albert, Alberta. An original Alberta Grain Co. elevator is seen to the right.

The Alberta Pacific Grain Company Limited began in 1900 as the Alberta Grain Company, founded by Nicholas Bawlf and associates. In 1911, Alberta Grain Co. was merged with the Alberta Pacific Company Limited to form the Alberta Pacific Grain Company Limited. In 1967, the company was taken over by Federal Grain.

== Remaining elevators ==
Historic (protected);

- Castor and District Museum, a local museum with a 1910 Alberta Pacific elevator.
- Meeting Creek, Alberta, 1914 Alberta Pacific elevator open to public for tours.
- St. Albert Grain Elevator Park is a museum consisting of two elevators: an original 1906 Alberta Grain Co. elevator and a 1929 Alberta Wheat Pool elevator.
- Val Marie, Saskatchewan, 1924 Alberta Pacific elevator.

Historic (Private-museum);

- Alberta Central Railway Museum, a railway museum with a historic 1906 Alberta Grain Co. elevator moved from Hobbema. The elevator is known to be Alberta's second-oldest grain elevator.
- Raley, Alberta, the oldest grain elevator in Alberta, was built in 1904-1905 by Alberta Pacific.
- Dorothy, Alberta, 1928, Alberta Pacific elevator in good condition with 2025 restoration.
- Lousana, Alberta, 1919, Alberta Pacific was in poor condition and moved to a private farm east of Lousana in 1973.

== See also ==
- List of Canadian Heritage Wheat Varieties
