= Chipman, Alberta =

Settlement in Canada, incorporated 1913

Chipman
- Village
- Village of Chipman
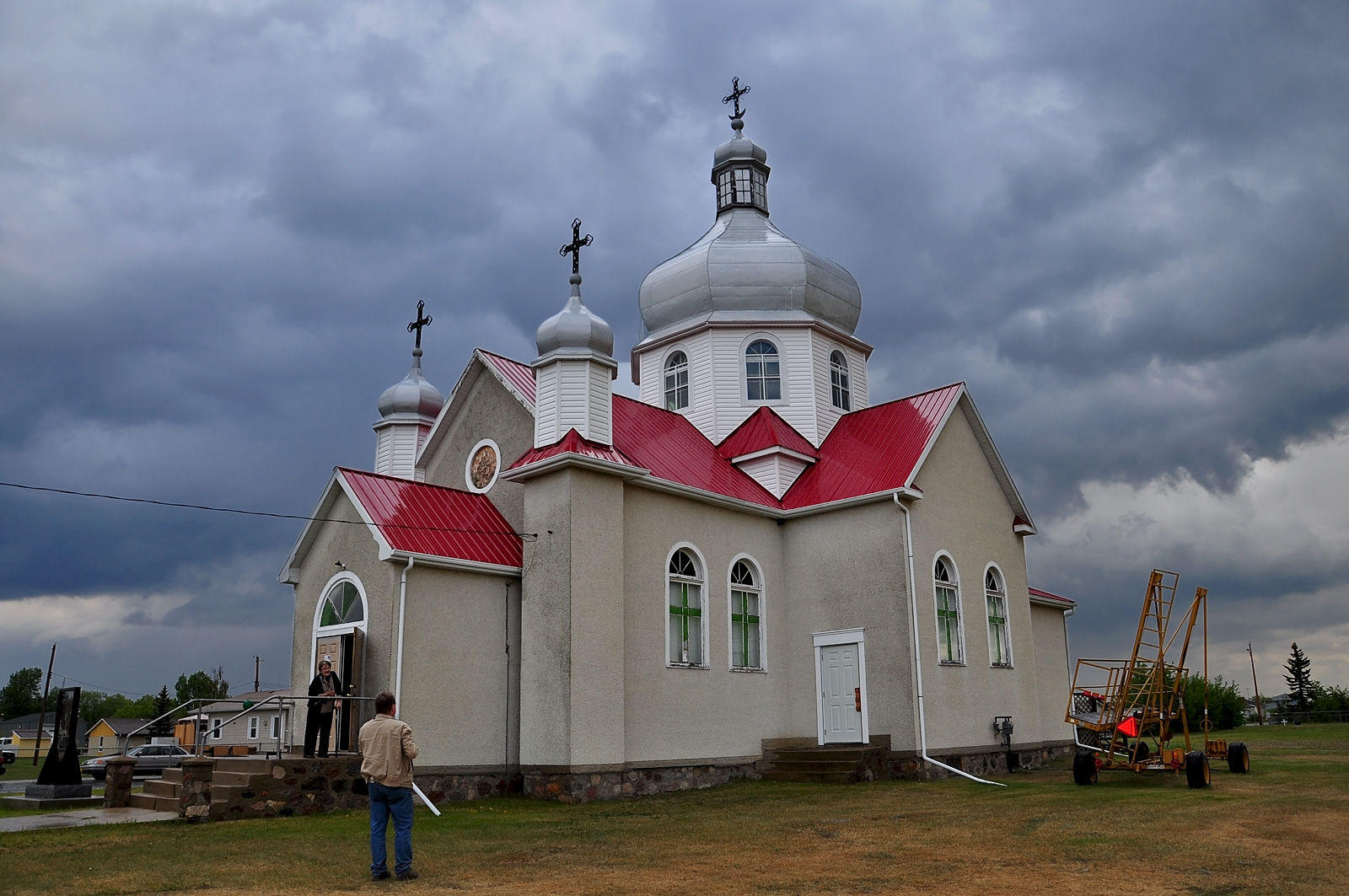
- Nativity of the Mother of God (St. Mary's) Ukrainian Catholic Church
- Nickname: Coyote Country
- Boundaries of Chipman

- Location in Alberta
- Coordinates: 53°41′56.6″N 112°38′08.7″W
- Country: Canada
- Province: Alberta
- Planning region: North Saskatchewan
- Municipal district: Lamont
- Incorporated
  - Village: October 21, 1913

Government
  - Mayor: Morris Langevin
  - Governing body: Chipman Village Council

Area (2021)
  - Land: 9.6 km^{2} (3.7 sq mi)
- Elevation: 670 m (2,200 ft)

Population (2021)
  - Total: 246
  - Density: 25.6/km^{2} (66/sq mi)
- Time zone: UTC−06:00 (Alberta Time)
- Highways: Highway 15; Highway 834
- Website: www.chipmanab.ca

Chipman is a village in central Alberta, Canada within Lamont County and Census Division No. 10. It is located on Highway 15, approximately 11 km (7 mi) southeast of Lamont, 22 km (14 mi) northwest of Mundare, 70 km (44 mi) east of Edmonton, and 30 km (18 mi) northeast of the Yellowhead Highway entrance to Elk Island National Park.

== History ==
Chipman was incorporated as a village on October 21, 1913. The village has the name of Clarence Campbell Chipman, a railroad official.

=== Surrounding area ===
L.I.D. 27N4 administered the Chipman-Mundare area upon its first meeting July 14, 1906 with Councillors Michael Eleniuk (chairman), J. Wilinski, P. Bahry, and H. Theis (secretary treasurer). Councillors were paid $2 per day and the secretary treasurer's salary was originally $100. On January 25, 1913, the area became the M.D. of Pines No. 516 with Councillors A. Achtemychuk (chairman), E. Halberg, M. Kozak, W. Miskew, J. Jakubec and A. Lappenbush. M. Korczynski was secretary treasurer.

In March 1944, the M.D. of Pines No. 516 was united with the municipal districts of Wostok and Leslie to form the M.D. of Lamont No. 516. It was later renumbered as M.D. of Lamont No. 82 on April 1, 1945.

On January 1, 1968, the County of Lamont No. 30 was incorporated through the unification of the Lamont School Division No. 18 and the M.D. of Lamont No. 82. It was eventually renamed to Lamont County on January 1, 2000.

== Demographics ==
In the 2021 Census of Population conducted by Statistics Canada, the Village of Chipman had a population of 246 living in 122 of its 143 total private dwellings, a change of −10.2% from its 2016 population of 274. With a land area of 9.6 km^{2} (3.7 sq mi), it had a population density of 25.6/km^{2} (66.4/sq mi) in 2021.

In the 2016 Census of Population conducted by Statistics Canada, the Village of Chipman recorded a population of 274 living in 124 of its 145 total private dwellings, a −3.5% change from its 2011 population of 284. With a land area of 9.61 km^{2} (3.71 sq mi), it had a population density of 28.5/km^{2} (73.8/sq mi) in 2016.

== Notable people ==
- Shannon Stubbs (born 1979), politician

== See also ==
- List of communities in Alberta
- List of francophone communities in Alberta
- List of villages in Alberta
