= Charles Alexander Young =

Canadian politician

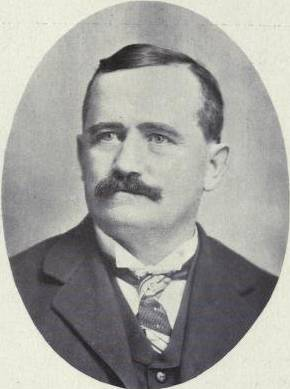

Member of the Legislative Assembly of Manitoba for Deloraine
- In office 1896–1903

Personal details
- Born: December 29, 1856; Saint-Chrysostome, Quebec
- Died: September 28, 1928 (aged 71); Winnipeg, Manitoba

Charles Alexander Young (December 29, 1856 – September 28, 1928) was a grain dealer and political figure in Manitoba, Canada. He represented Deloraine from 1896 to 1903 in the Legislative Assembly of Manitoba as a Liberal.

== Background ==
Born in St. Chrysostome, Châteauguay County, Canada East, the son of Duncan Young, Charles served as president of the Winnipeg Grain Exchange in 1902.

Young died at home in Winnipeg at the age of 71.

His brother Finlay McNaughton Young, who was a member of the Canadian House of Commons, also served in the Manitoba assembly.
