= Braim, Alberta =

Braim
- Unincorporated community
- Location in Alberta Location in Canada
- Coordinates: 53.044°N 112.827°W
- Country: Canada
- Province: Alberta
- Planning region: North Saskatchewan
- Municipal district: Camrose County

Area (2021)
  - Land: 0.42 km^{2} (0.16 sq mi)

Population (2021)
  - Total: 85
  - Density: 201.9/km^{2} (523/sq mi)
- Time zone: UTC−06:00 (Alberta Time)
- Area codes: 780, 587, 825
- Highways: 833

Braim is an unincorporated community in Alberta, Canada within Camrose County that is recognized as a designated place by Statistics Canada. It is located on the east side of Highway 833, 2.4 km (1.5 mi) north of Highway 13. It is adjacent to the City of Camrose to the south and the Camrose Airport to the east.

== Demographics ==
In the 2021 Census of Population conducted by Statistics Canada, Braim had a population of 85 living in 32 of its 33 total private dwellings, a change of −8.6% from its 2016 population of 93. With a land area of 0.42 km^{2} (0.16 sq mi), it had a population density of 202.4/km^{2} (524.2/sq mi) in 2021.

As a designated place in the 2016 Census of Population conducted by Statistics Canada, Braim had a population of 78 living in 31 of its 32 total private dwellings, a change of −7.1% from its 2011 population of 84. With a land area of 0.34 km^{2} (0.13 sq mi), it had a population density of 229.4/km^{2} (594.2/sq mi) in 2016.

== See also ==
- List of communities in Alberta
- List of designated places in Alberta
