= Round Hill, Alberta =

Round Hill
- Hamlet
- Location of Round Hill in Alberta
- Coordinates: 53.1653°N 112.6308°W
- Country: Canada
- Province: Alberta
- Census division: No. 10
- Municipal district: Camrose County

Government
  - Type: Unincorporated
  - Governing body: Camrose County Council

Area (2021)
  - Land: 2.59 km^{2} (1.00 sq mi)
- Elevation: 740 m (2,430 ft)

Population (2021)
  - Total: 125
  - Density: 48.3/km^{2} (125/sq mi)
- Time zone: UTC−06:00 (Alberta Time)

Round Hill is a hamlet in central Alberta, Canada within Camrose County. It is located on Highway 834 approximately 29 kilometres (18 mi) northeast of Camrose and has an elevation of 740 metres (2,430 ft).

The hamlet is located in Census Division No. 10 and in the federal riding of Crowfoot.

== Demographics ==
Population history of Round Hill
| Year | Pop. | ±% |
|---|---|---|
| 1941 | 222 | — |
| 1951 | 208 | −6.3% |
| 1956 | 180 | −13.5% |
| 1961 | 160 | −11.1% |
| 1966 | 122 | −23.8% |
| 1971 | 97 | −20.5% |
| 1976 | 123 | +26.8% |
| 1981 | 121 | −1.6% |
| 1986 | 132 | +9.1% |
| 1991 | 102 | −22.7% |
| 1991A | 106 | +3.9% |
| 1996 | 107 | +0.9% |
| 2001 | 115 | +7.5% |
| 2006 | 138 | +20.0% |
| 2011 | 122 | −11.6% |
| 2016 | 129 | +5.7% |
| 2021 | 125 | −3.1% |
Source: Statistics Canada

In the 2021 Census of Population conducted by Statistics Canada, Round Hill had a population of 125 living in 54 of its 58 total private dwellings, a change of −3.1% from its 2016 population of 129. With a land area of 2.59 km^{2} (1.00 sq mi), it had a population density of 48.3/km^{2} (125.0/sq mi) in 2021.

As a designated place in the 2016 Census of Population conducted by Statistics Canada, Round Hill had a population of 129 living in 50 of its 51 total private dwellings, a change of 5.7% from its 2011 population of 122. With a land area of 2.59 km^{2} (1.00 sq mi), it had a population density of 49.8/km^{2} (129.0/sq mi) in 2016.

== Education ==
Round Hill School is located in the hamlet offering Kindergarten through Grade 9 in Battle River School Division. It offers a volleyball and basketball team for kids in grade 6 to 9.

== See also ==
- List of communities in Alberta
- List of designated places in Alberta
- List of hamlets in Alberta
