= Kingman, Alberta =

Kingman
- Hamlet
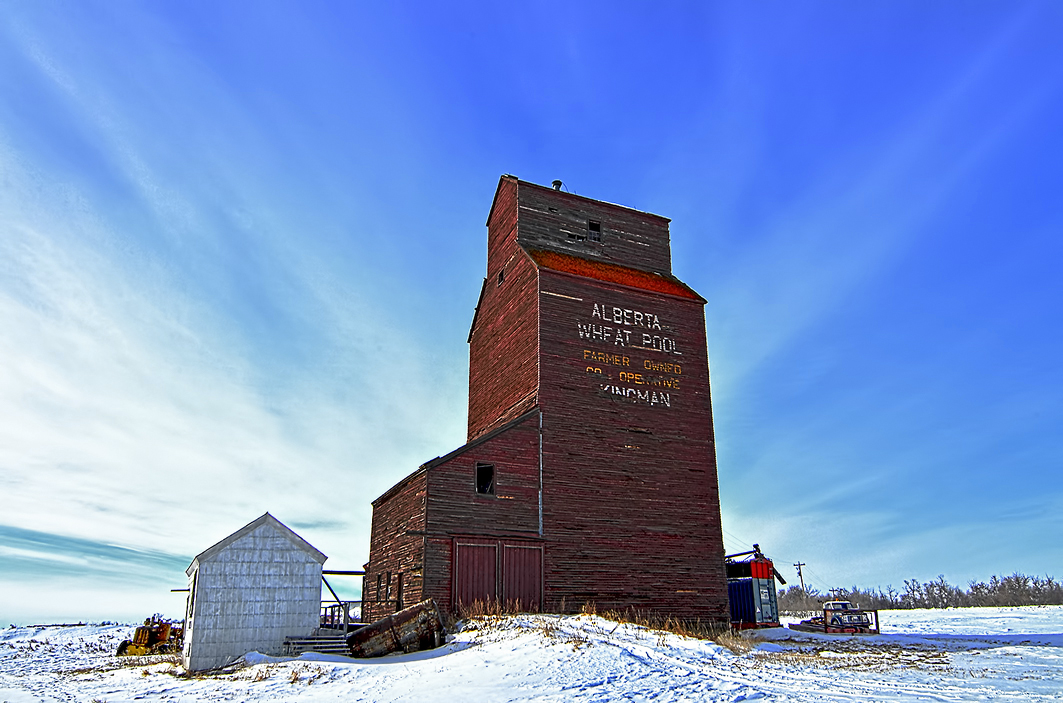
- Former Kingman Alberta Wheat Pool elevator. Now located on a private farm south of Kingman.

- Location of Kingman in Alberta
- Coordinates: 53.2133°N 112.7494°W
- Country: Canada
- Province: Alberta
- Census division: No. 10
- Municipal district: Camrose County
- Established: 1909

Government
  - Type: Unincorporated
  - Governing body: Camrose County Council

Area (2021)
  - Land: 0.43 km^{2} (0.17 sq mi)
- Elevation: 740 m (2,430 ft)

Population (2021)
  - Total: 78
  - Density: 181.9/km^{2} (471/sq mi)
- Time zone: UTC−06:00 (Alberta Time)
- Postal code: T0C 1L0
- Area codes: 780, 587

Kingman is a hamlet in central Alberta, Canada within Camrose County. It is located approximately 27 kilometres (17 mi) north of Camrose and has an elevation of 740 metres (2,430 ft).

The hamlet is located in Census Division No. 10 and in the federal riding of Crowfoot.

As proclaimed on the entry signs for the hamlet, Kingman is known as the Lutefisk capital of Alberta.

== Demographics ==
Population history of Kingman
Year	Pop.	±%
1941	94	—
1951	111	+18.1%
1956	117	+5.4%
1961	108	−7.7%
1966	93	−13.9%
1971	81	−12.9%
1976	74	−8.6%
1981	72	−2.7%
1986	83	+15.3%
1991	79	−4.8%
1996	93	+17.7%
2001	80	−14.0%
2006	87	+8.7%
2011	90	+3.4%
2016	103	+14.4%
2021	78	−24.3%
Source: Statistics Canada

In the 2021 Census of Population conducted by Statistics Canada, Kingman had a population of 78 living in 39 of its 43 total private dwellings, a change of −24.3% from its 2016 population of 103. With a land area of 0.43 km^{2} (0.17 sq mi), it had a population density of 181.4/km^{2} (469.8/sq mi) in 2021.

As a designated place in the 2016 Census of Population conducted by Statistics Canada, Kingman had a population of 103 living in 44 of its 49 total private dwellings, a change of 14.4% from its 2011 population of 90. With a land area of 0.43 km^{2} (0.17 sq mi), it had a population density of 239.5/km^{2} (620.4/sq mi) in 2016.

== See also ==
- List of communities in Alberta
- List of designated places in Alberta
- List of hamlets in Alberta
