= Hay Lakes =

Hay Lakes Hay Lake (1928–1932)
- Village
- Village of Hay Lakes
- Location of Hay Lakes in Alberta
- Coordinates: 53°11′33″N 113°03′19″W
- Country: Canada
- Province: Alberta
- Region: Central Alberta
- Census division: 10
- Municipal district: Camrose County
- Incorporated
  - Village: April 17, 1928 (as Hay Lake)
  - Name change: January 1, 1932

Government
  - Mayor: Paige Berkholtz
  - Governing body: Hay Lakes Village Council
  - MLA: Wes Taylor

Area (2021)
  - Land: 0.59 km^{2} (0.23 sq mi)
- Elevation: 770 m (2,530 ft)

Population (2021)
  - Total: 525
  - Density: 771.6/km^{2} (1,998/sq mi)
- Time zone: UTC−06:00 (Alberta Time)
- Postal code: T0B 1W0
- Area codes: +1-780, +1-587
- Highways: Highway 21; Highway 617
- Waterway: Big Hay Lake, Bittern Lake
- Website: Official website

Hay Lakes is a village in central Alberta, Canada. It is located along Highway 21, approximately 32 km (20 mi) north of Camrose and 50 km (31 mi) southeast of Edmonton. Hay Lakes was pioneered and settled primarily by immigrants from Sweden and Norway. Hay Lakes' founding pioneer was James McKernan who established a telegraph station in the area in 1876. In 1911 the Canadian National Railway began its Edmonton to Calgary line which ran through Hay Lakes. Hay Lakes was incorporated as a village in 1928. It was known as the Village of Hay Lake between 1928 and 1932.

== Demographics ==
In the 2021 Census of Population conducted by Statistics Canada, the Village of Hay Lakes had a population of 456 living in 176 of its 185 total private dwellings, a change of −7.9% from its 2016 population of 495. With a land area of 0.59 km^{2} (0.23 sq mi), it had a population density of 772.9/km^{2} (2,001.8/sq mi) in 2021.

In the 2016 Census of Population conducted by Statistics Canada, the Village of Hay Lakes recorded a population of 495 living in 191 of its 203 total private dwellings, a 16.5% change from its 2011 population of 425. With a land area of 0.59 km^{2} (0.23 sq mi), it had a population density of 839.0/km^{2} (2,173.0/sq mi) in 2016.

== See also ==
- List of communities in Alberta
- List of francophone communities in Alberta
- List of villages in Alberta
