= Ryley =

- Village
- Village of Ryley
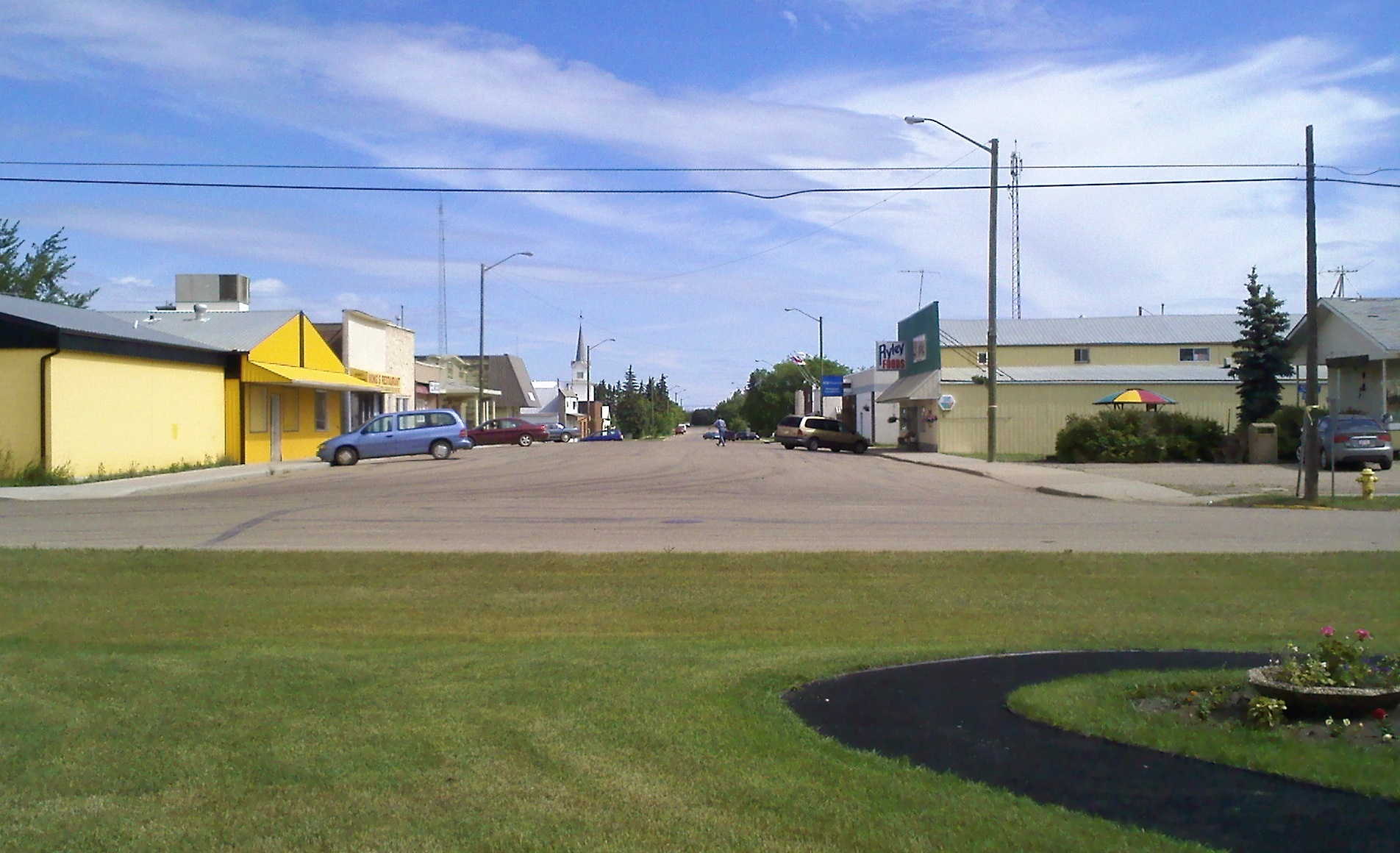
- Main street

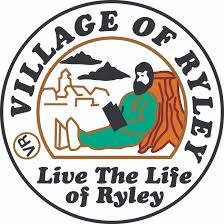
- Motto: Live the Life of Ryley
- Location of Ryley in Alberta
- Coordinates: 53°17′22″N 112°25′42″W
- Country: Canada
- Province: Alberta
- Region: Central Alberta
- Census Division: No. 10
- Municipal district: Beaver County
- Founded: 1909 (as Equity)
- Incorporated
  - Village: April 2, 1910

Government
  - Mayor: Stephanie Dennis
  - Governing body: Ryley Village Council: Cyndy Heslin; Mickey Wilson; Stephanie McMillan; Dale Roth
  - CAO: Glen Hamilton-Brown

Area (2021)
  - Land: 2.53 km^{2} (0.98 sq mi)
- Elevation: 693 m (2,274 ft)

Population (2021)
  - Total: 484
  - Density: 191.6/km^{2} (496/sq mi)
- Time zone: UTC−06:00 (Alberta Time)
- Postal Code: T0B 4A0
- Area code: 780
- Highways: 14; 854
- Waterways: Creeks to the east form the head of Vermilion River; Amisk Creek to the west runs north to Beaverhill Lake
- Website: Official website

Ryley is a village in central Alberta, Canada. It is surrounded by Beaver County, along Highway 14 between the City of Edmonton and the Town of Viking. The City of Camrose is approximately 58 km (36 mi) south of Ryley. The village was named in 1908 after George Urquhart Ryley, Grand Trunk Pacific Railway Land Commissioner at the time.

== Demographics ==
In the 2021 Census of Population conducted by Statistics Canada, the Village of Ryley had a population of 484 living in 225 of its 250 total private dwellings, a change of 0.2% from its 2016 population of 483. With a land area of 2.53 km^{2} (0.98 sq mi), it had a population density of 191.3/km^{2} (495.5/sq mi) in 2021.

Within Beaver County, Ryley was the only municipality to rise in population during the 2021 Census of a total population drop of 199 across the rest of the County.

In the 2016 Census of Population conducted by Statistics Canada, the Village of Ryley recorded a population of 483 living in 208 of its 235 total private dwellings, a −2.8% change from its 2011 population of 497. With a land area of 2.61 km^{2} (1.01 sq mi), it had a population density of 185.1/km^{2} (479.3/sq mi) in 2016.

== Governance ==
As set out by the Alberta Municipal Government Act, and overseen by Alberta Municipal Affairs, the village is governed by five councillors, who are elected at-large every four years. Stephanie Dennis is the mayor, one of the Councillors selected and appointed by the others. The chief administrative officer, is the head of village administration.

== Attractions ==
Ryley boasts many facilities, such as Alberta's only indoor swimming pool in a village, a school which operates four days a week, a museum, a three-sheet indoor curling rink, an outdoor skating rink, a skate park, and a community hall.

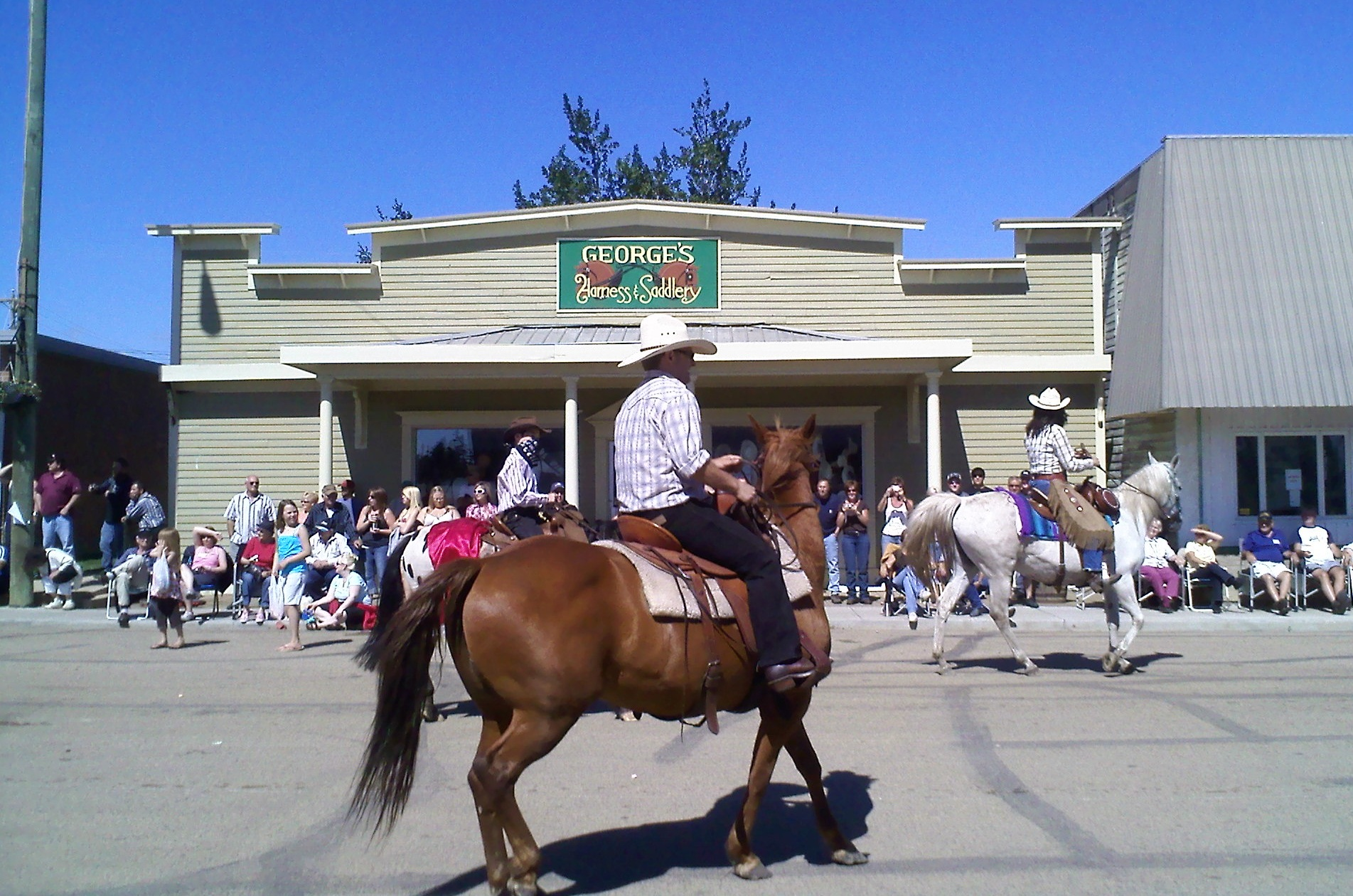
Living museum and saddlery, George's Harness & Saddlery, with owner/operator Morley Knudslien

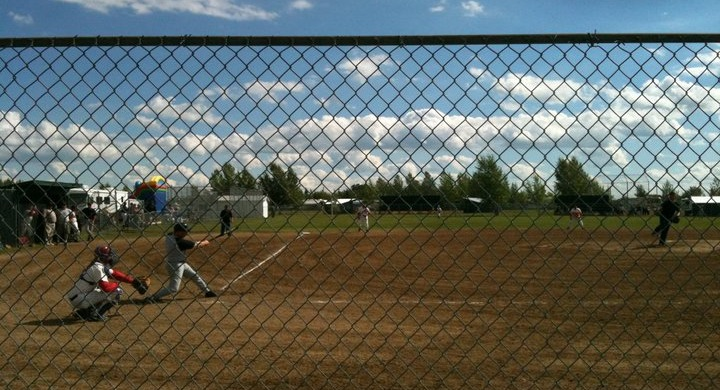
The sports grounds

== See also ==
- List of communities in Alberta
- List of villages in Alberta
