= Camrose County =

Municipal district in Alberta, Canada

- Municipal district
- Logo

- Location within Alberta
- Coordinates: 53°01′22″N 112°49′42″W
- Country: Canada
- Province: Alberta
- Region: Central Alberta
- Census division: 10
- Established: 1944
- Incorporated: 1963

Government
  - Reeve: Cindy Trautman
  - Governing body: Camrose County Council: Gregory Gillespie; Don Gregorwich; Jack Lyle; Douglas Lyseng; Trevor Miller; Cindy Trautman; Brian Willoughby
  - Administrator: Paul King
  - Administrative office: Camrose

Area (2021)
  - Land: 3,291.75 km^{2} (1,270.95 sq mi)

Population (2021)
  - Total: 8,504
  - Density: 2.6/km^{2} (6.7/sq mi)
- Time zone: UTC−06:00 (Alberta Time)
- Website: county.camrose.ab.ca

Camrose County is a municipal district in central Alberta, Canada. It is located in Census Division 10, around the City of Camrose.

== Geography ==
=== Communities and localities ===
The following urban municipalities are surrounded by Camrose County.

Cities

- Camrose

Towns

- Bashaw

Villages

- Bawlf
- Bittern Lake
- Edberg
- Hay Lakes
- Rosalind

Summer villages

- none

The following hamlets are located within Camrose County.

Hamlets

- Armena
- Duhamel
- Ferintosh, dissolved from village status on January 1, 2020
- Kelsey
- Kingman
- Meeting Creek
- New Norway, dissolved from village status on November 1, 2012
- Ohaton
- Pelican Point
- Round Hill
- Tillicum Beach

The following localities are located within Camrose County.

Localities

- Ankerton
- Barlee Junction
- Battle
- Braim (designated place)
- Campbelton
- Demay
- Dinant
- Dorenlee
- Dried Meat Lake
- Edensville
- Ervick

- Ferlow Junction
- Grouse Meadows
- Kiron
- Mccree Acres
- Meldal Subdivision
- Miquelon Acres
- Paradise Resort
- Sherman Park Subdivision
- Twomey
- Viewpoint
- Woodridge Heights

== Demographics ==
In the 2021 Census of Population conducted by Statistics Canada, Camrose County had a population of 8,504 living in 3,223 of its 3,688 total private dwellings, a change of −1.8% from its 2016 population of 8,660. With a land area of 3,291.75 km^{2} (1,270.95 sq mi), it had a population density of 2.6/km^{2} (6.7/sq mi) in 2021.

In the 2016 Census of Population conducted by Statistics Canada, Camrose County had a population of 8,458 living in 3,118 of its 3,492 total private dwellings, a 5.7% change from its 2011 population of 8,004. With a land area of 3,324.21 km^{2} (1,283.48 sq mi), it had a population density of 2.5/km^{2} (6.6/sq mi) in 2016.

== See also ==
- List of communities in Alberta
- List of municipal districts in Alberta
