= Rosalind, Alberta =

Rosalind
- Village
- Village of Rosalind
- Location in Alberta
- Coordinates: 52°47′14.2″N 112°26′24.9″W
- Country: Canada
- Province: Alberta
- Region: Central Alberta
- Census division: 10
- Municipal district: Camrose County
- Incorporated
  - Village: January 1, 1966

Government
  - Mayor: James McTavish
  - Governing body: Rosalind Village Council

Area (2021)
  - Land: 0.62 km^{2} (0.24 sq mi)
- Elevation: 710 m (2,330 ft)

Population (2021)
  - Total: 162
  - Density: 261.1/km^{2} (676/sq mi)
- Time zone: UTC−06:00 (Alberta Time)
- Highways: Highway 609; Highway 854
- Website: Official website

Rosalind is a village located in the prairies of central Alberta, Canada. It is located on Highway 854, approximately 120 kilometres (75 mi) southeast of Edmonton and 30 kilometres (19 mi) southeast of Camrose, the closest major trading centre.

The name Rosalind was first used in 1905 and is likely an amalgamation of the nearby school districts Montrose and East Lynne.

Rosalind has a number of small businesses, an elementary school and a junior high school. The village provides various municipal services to its residents including fire protection.

== Demographics ==
In the 2021 Census of Population conducted by Statistics Canada, the Village of Rosalind had a population of 162 living in 75 of its 84 total private dwellings, a change of −13.8% from its 2016 population of 188. With a land area of 0.62 km^{2} (0.24 sq mi), it had a population density of 261.3/km^{2} (676.7/sq mi) in 2021.

In the 2016 Census of Population conducted by Statistics Canada, the Village of Rosalind recorded a population of 188 living in 87 of its 95 total private dwellings, a −1.1% change from its 2011 population of 190. With a land area of 0.62 km^{2} (0.24 sq mi), it had a population density of 303.2/km^{2} (785.4/sq mi) in 2016.

== Amenities ==
Rosalind has a community hall that holds events such as family reunions and weddings. The village also has a hockey arena and baseball diamonds.

== See also ==
- List of communities in Alberta
- List of villages in Alberta
