= Nicholas Bawlf =

Canadian businessman (1849-1914)

- Born: July 17, 1849; Smiths Falls, Canada West
- Died: December 26, 1914 (aged 65); Winnipeg, Manitoba
- Occupation: grain merchant

Nicholas Bawlf (15 July 1849 – 26 December 1914) was a Canadian grain merchant, and important figure in the development of Winnipeg as the centre of the Canadian grain trade.

Bawlf was born in Smiths Falls, Canada West on July 15, 1849 to Nicholas Bawlf and Catharine Kirby. He would marry Catharine Madden on February 6, 1877 and moved to Winnipeg the same year. He began at once in the flour, feed, and grain business. In 1887, he and 10 other grain merchants formed the Winnipeg Grain and Produce Exchange. He was one of the first traders to use Pacific ports to tap Asian export markets. In 1900 he began Alberta Grain Company.

Bawlf was a Catholic who opposed the Manitoba School Act of 1890. He held many positions of power and influence in a number of businesses in Winnipeg and elsewhere.

Bawlf is the namesake of the village of Bawlf, Alberta.
