= Tofield =

- Town
- Town of Tofield
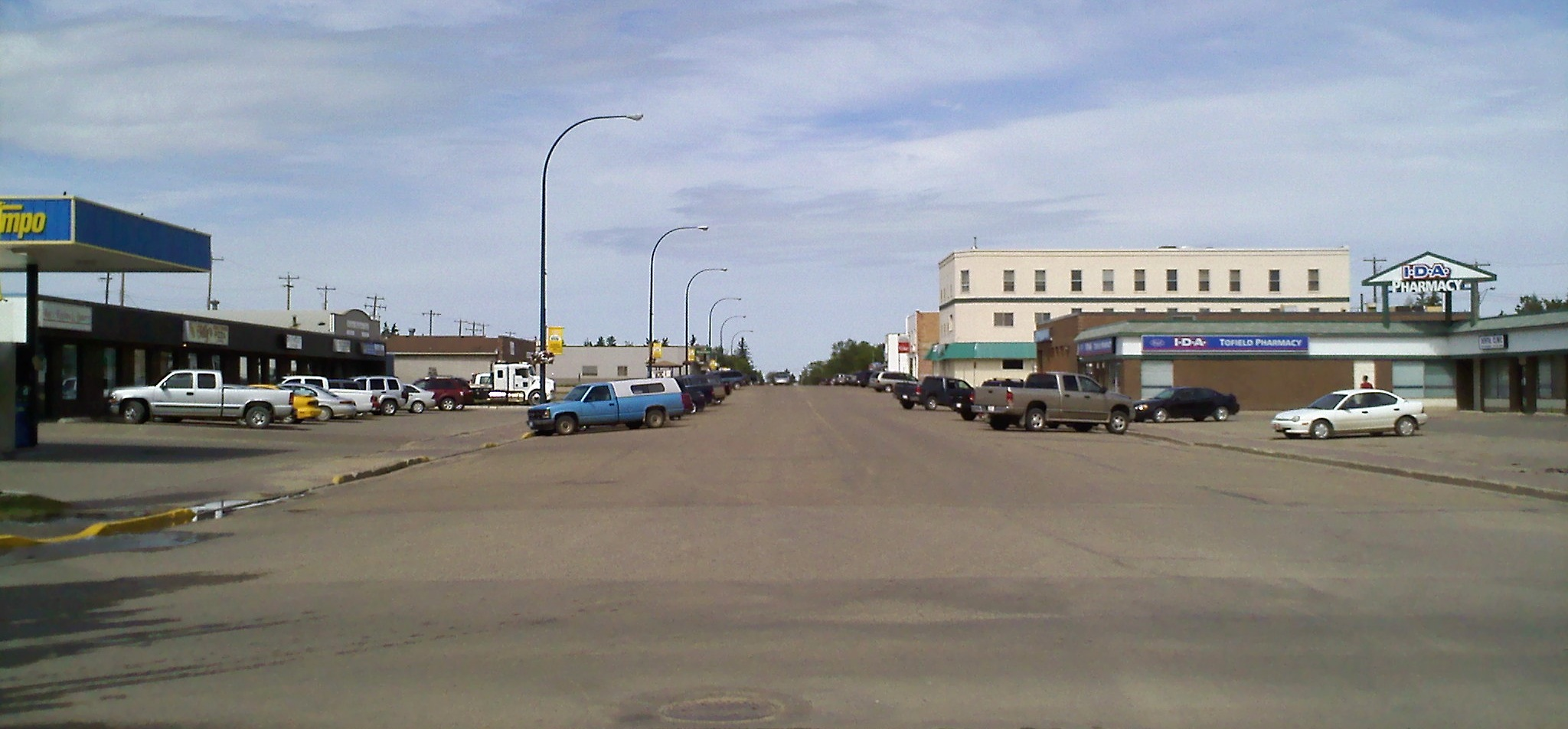
- Main street

- Location of Tofield in Alberta
- Coordinates: 53°22′13″N 112°40′0″W
- Country: Canada
- Province: Alberta
- Region: Central Alberta
- Census division: 10
- Municipal district: Beaver County
- Incorporated
  - Village: September 9, 1907
  - Town: September 10, 1909

Government
  - Mayor: Adam Hall
  - Governing body: Tofield Town Council: Brenda Chehade; Dustin Terpstra; Jennifer Durrant; Elaine Taylor
  - CAO: Jeff Edwards

Area (2021)
  - Land: 8.21 km^{2} (3.17 sq mi)
- Elevation: 700 m (2,300 ft)

Population (2021)
  - Total: 2,045
  - Density: 249.2/km^{2} (645/sq mi)
- Time zone: UTC−06:00 (Alberta Time)
- Postal code: T0B 4J0
- Area code: +1-780
- Highways: Highway 14; Highway 834
- Waterway: Beaverhill Lake
- Website: Official website

Tofield /ˈtoʊfiːld/ is a town in central Alberta, Canada. It is approximately 68 km (42 mi) east of Edmonton at the junction of Highway 14, Highway 834, and Highway 626. Beaverhill Lake is located immediately northeast of the community.

== History ==
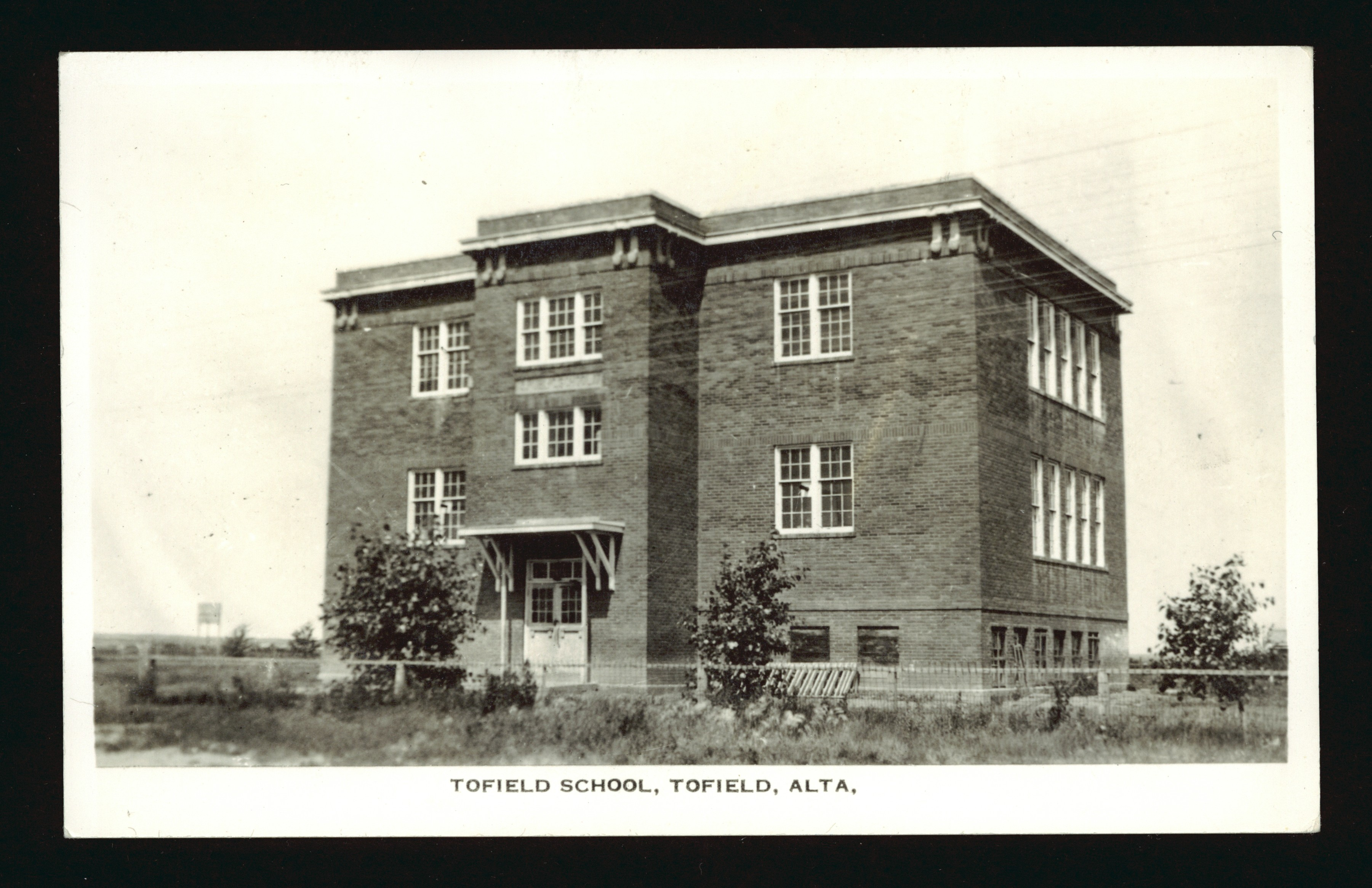
Tofield School

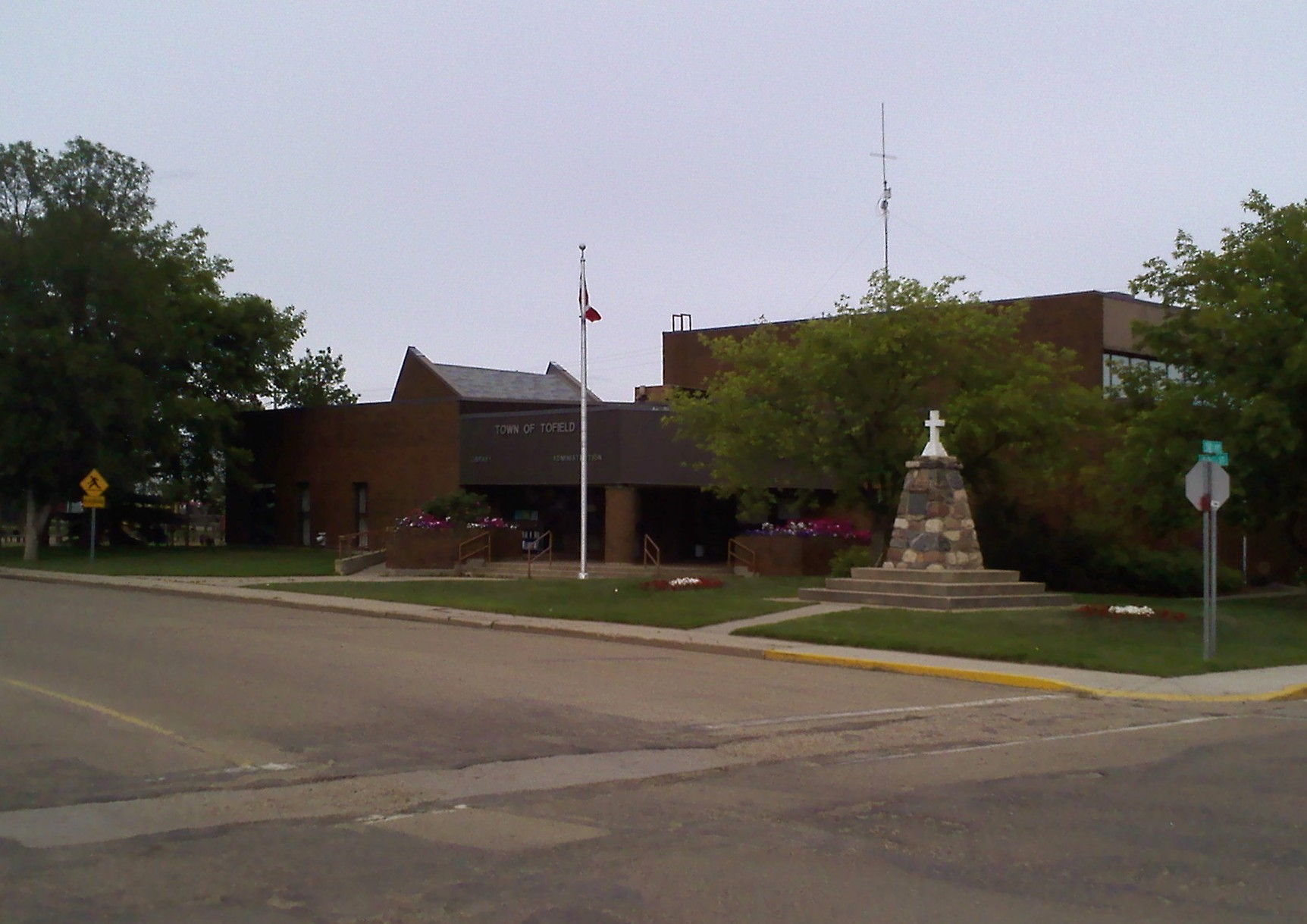
Administration building and library

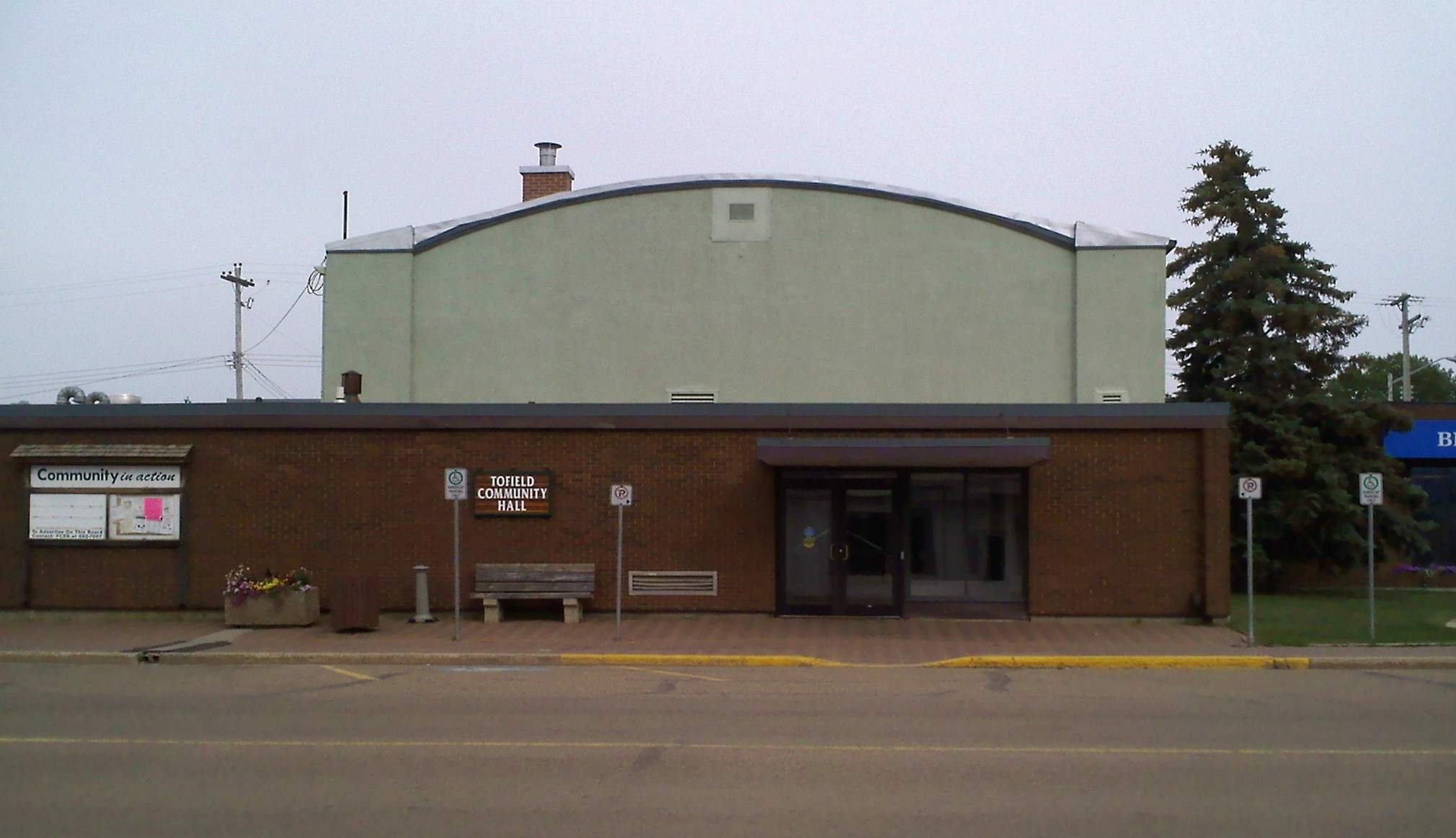
Tofield Community Hall

Before 1865, only Aboriginal people lived in this area, the home of the Cree. Beaverhill Lake (known then as Beaver or Beaver Hills Lake) was full of fish and wildfowl. A variety of wild fruits could be eaten fresh or added to pemmican. Big game animals, including herds of bison, were available for food and clothing.

Tofield's Aboriginal legacy is evident in the names of local creeks: Maskawan, Amisk and Ketchamoot. The latter refers to Chief Ketchamoot who came from Ft. Pitt in 1860 to help the local Crees against their traditional Blackfoot enemies. Victorious, he remained in the area, and is buried on the bank of the Ketchamoot Creek.

Tofield's first school was organized in 1890 and named McKenzie School in honor of the first postmaster in the area, at the Logan post office. The Tofield Post Office was obtained in 1897, and was located at the south end of Beaverhill Lake.

The town of Tofield had its beginning in 1906 when Morton and Adams built a General Store near the Post Office at a site southeast of present-day Tofield. By the spring of 1906 other businesses, including a lumber yard, hardware store, another general store, a drug store, a blacksmith shop and a hotel, had been founded.

Very soon after that, the town moved to a site northwest of the old site and north of the present townsite when the Edmonton-based company Crafts and Lee offered free lots that were near the site of the proposed route of the Grand Trunk Pacific Railway. By fall of 1908 two blocks of businesses were filled and all residential lots were full.

Later that year the Grand Trunk Pacific Railway decided on a route south of the second townsite and the town moved again, to its present location. Tofield was proclaimed a village on September 9, 1907 and became a town just two years later in 1909.

=== Name origin ===
Tofield is named after the pioneer medical man, Dr. J.H. Tofield, who came to the area in 1893 from England. He was born in Yorkshire and educated in Oxford as a doctor and as an engineer. Tofield arrived in Edmonton in 1882 and served as an army doctor in the Riel Rebellion. The name Tofield was first applied to the school district and in March 1898 to the post office.

== Geography ==
=== Climate ===
Tofield experiences a humid continental climate (Köppen climate classification Dfb).

Climate data for Tofield
Month	Jan	Feb	Mar	Apr	May	Jun	Jul	Aug	Sep	Oct	Nov	Dec	Year
Record high °C (°F)	15.5 (59.9)	15 (59)	16.5 (61.7)	30 (86)	32 (90)	30.6 (87.1)	32.5 (90.5)	33.5 (92.3)	33 (91)	28.5 (83.3)	18.9 (66.0)	14.9 (58.8)	33.5 (92.3)
Mean daily maximum °C (°F)	−6.5 (20.3)	−3.9 (25.0)	1.3 (34.3)	10.6 (51.1)	16.8 (62.2)	20.2 (68.4)	22.2 (72.0)	21.3 (70.3)	16.5 (61.7)	10.3 (50.5)	−0.2 (31.6)	−5.6 (21.9)	8.6 (47.5)
Daily mean °C (°F)	−11.6 (11.1)	−9.2 (15.4)	−3.7 (25.3)	4.6 (40.3)	10.5 (50.9)	14.2 (57.6)	16.3 (61.3)	15.3 (59.5)	10.6 (51.1)	5 (41)	−4.6 (23.7)	−10.4 (13.3)	3.1 (37.6)
Mean daily minimum °C (°F)	−16.6 (2.1)	−14.6 (5.7)	−8.7 (16.3)	−1.3 (29.7)	4.2 (39.6)	8.1 (46.6)	10.5 (50.9)	9.3 (48.7)	4.7 (40.5)	−0.4 (31.3)	−9 (16)	−15.2 (4.6)	−2.4 (27.7)
Record low °C (°F)	−42.5 (−44.5)	−42.5 (−44.5)	−32 (−26)	−31 (−24)	−9 (16)	−2.5 (27.5)	3 (37)	−3 (27)	−8.5 (16.7)	−23.5 (−10.3)	−35.5 (−31.9)	−45.6 (−50.1)	−45.6 (−50.1)
Average precipitation mm (inches)	22.3 (0.88)	17.4 (0.69)	22.5 (0.89)	25.8 (1.02)	50.5 (1.99)	84.6 (3.33)	95.2 (3.75)	75.1 (2.96)	51.6 (2.03)	18.7 (0.74)	18.8 (0.74)	23.2 (0.91)	505.7 (19.91)
Source: Environment Canada

== Demographics ==
In the 2021 Census of Population conducted by Statistics Canada, the Town of Tofield had a population of 2,045 living in 807 of its 871 total private dwellings, a change of −1.7% from its 2016 population of 2,081. With a land area of 8.21 km^{2} (3.17 sq mi), it had a population density of 249.1/km^{2} (645.1/sq mi) in 2021.

In the 2016 Census of Population conducted by Statistics Canada, the Town of Tofield recorded a population of 2,081 living in 814 of its 864 total private dwellings, a −4.6% change from its 2011 population of 2,182. With a land area of 8.21 km^{2} (3.17 sq mi), it had a population density of 253.5/km^{2} (656.5/sq mi) in 2016.

== Attractions ==
- Beaverhill Lake
- Ukrainian Cultural Heritage Village

== Infrastructure ==
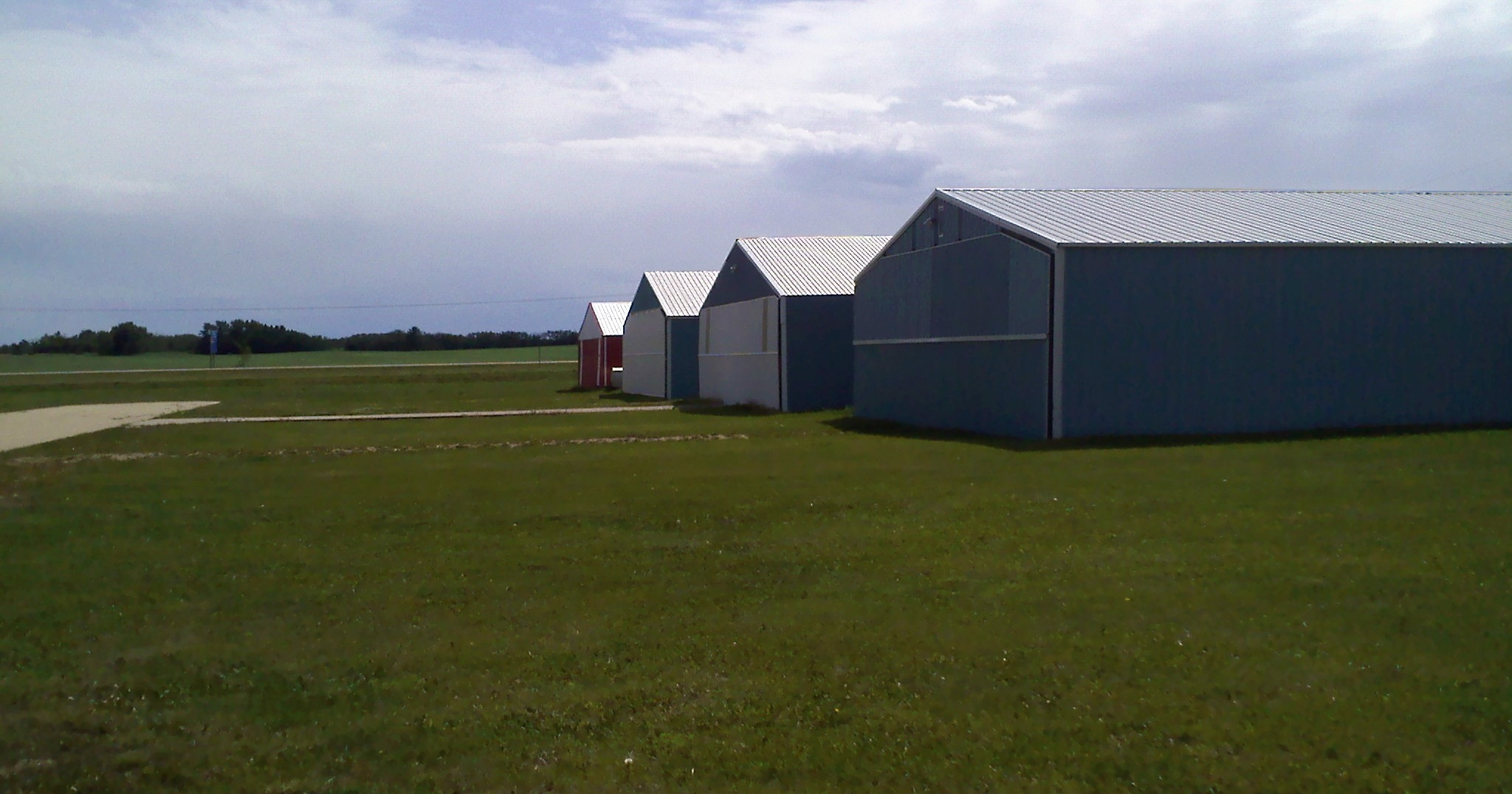
Tofield Airport hangars

Transportation

The town is served by the Tofield Airport, operated by Town of Tofield.

== Education ==
C.W. Sears Elementary School provides education from Kindergarten to grade 4, Tofield School from grade 5 to 12, and Northstar Outreach School grades 10 to 12.

== See also ==
- List of communities in Alberta
- List of towns in Alberta
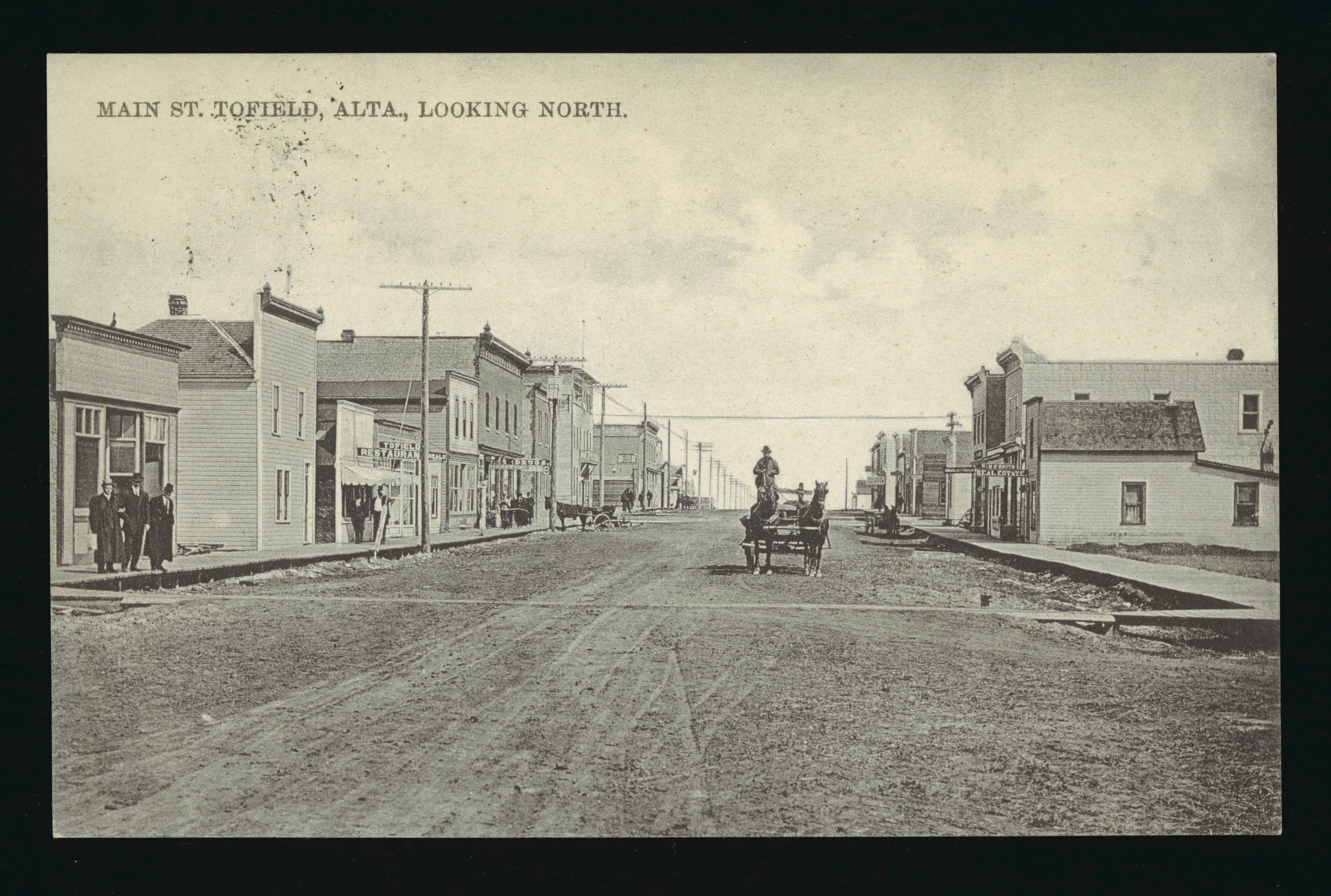
The main street of Tofield, looking north some time between 1911 and 1927

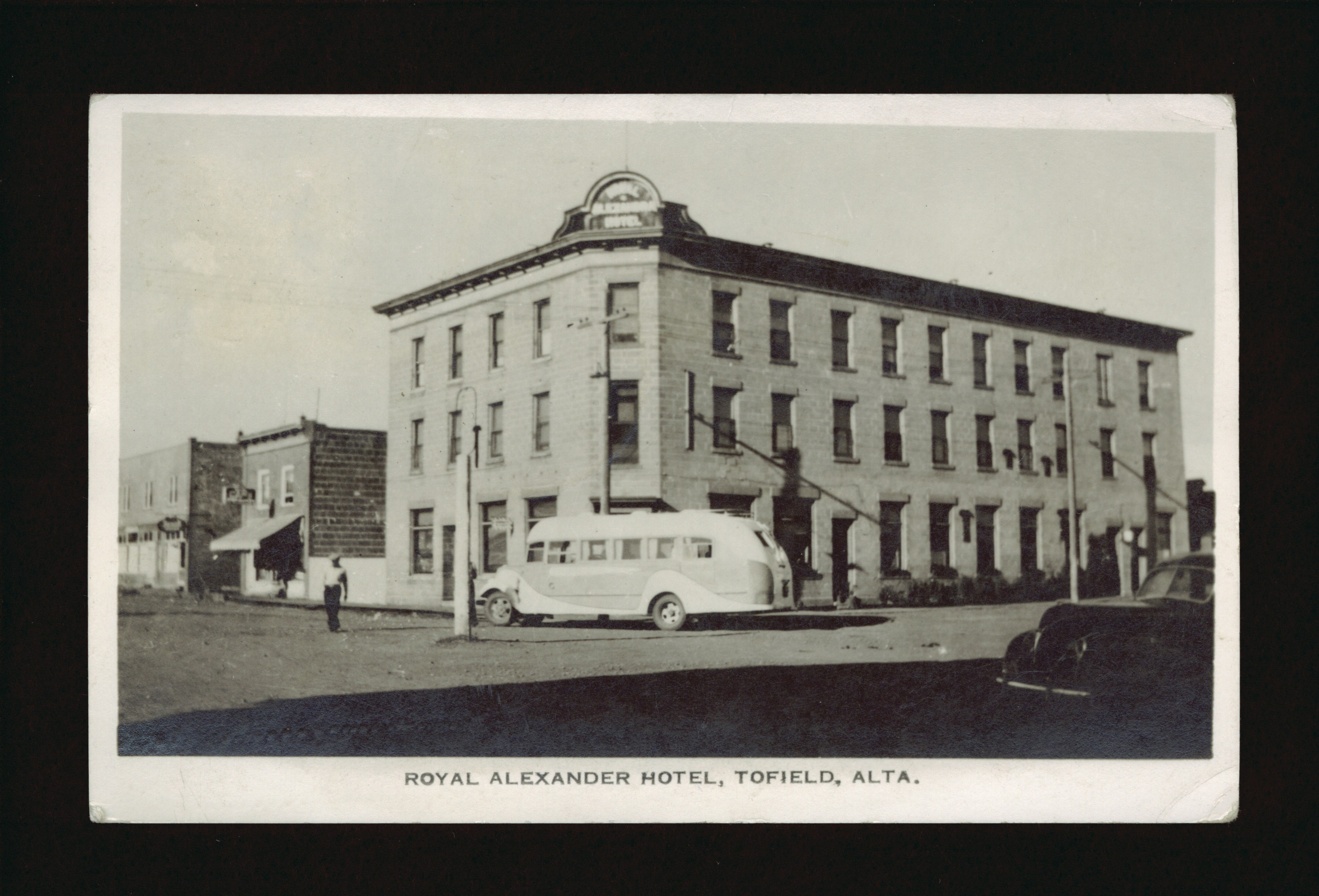
The Royal Alexandra Hotel in 1944. The caption incorrectly labels it as the Royal Alexander Hotel.

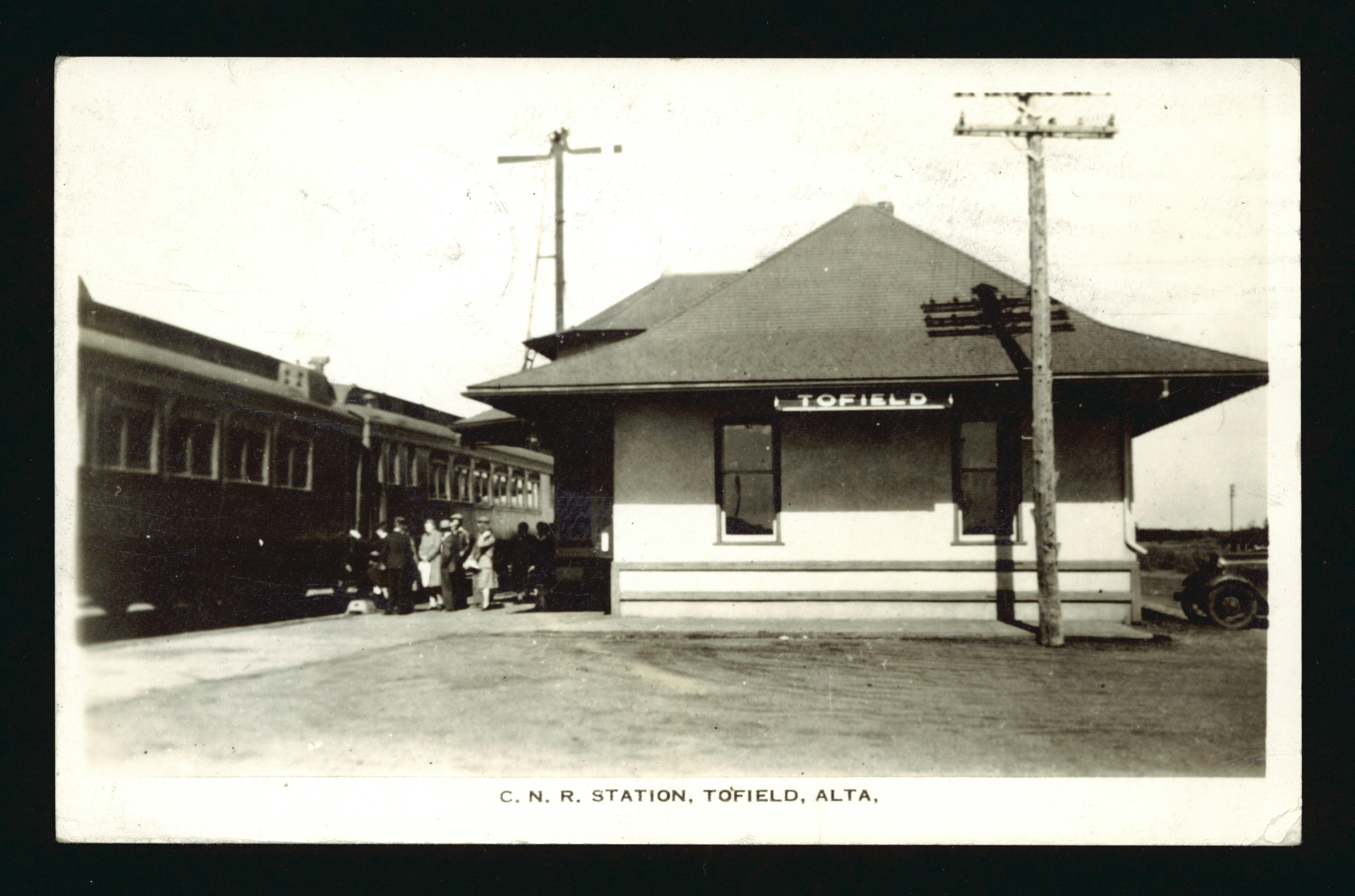
The Canadian Northern Railway station in Tofield, Alberta, in 1943.
