= Beaver County, Alberta =

Municipal district in Alberta, Canada

Beaver County
- Municipal district
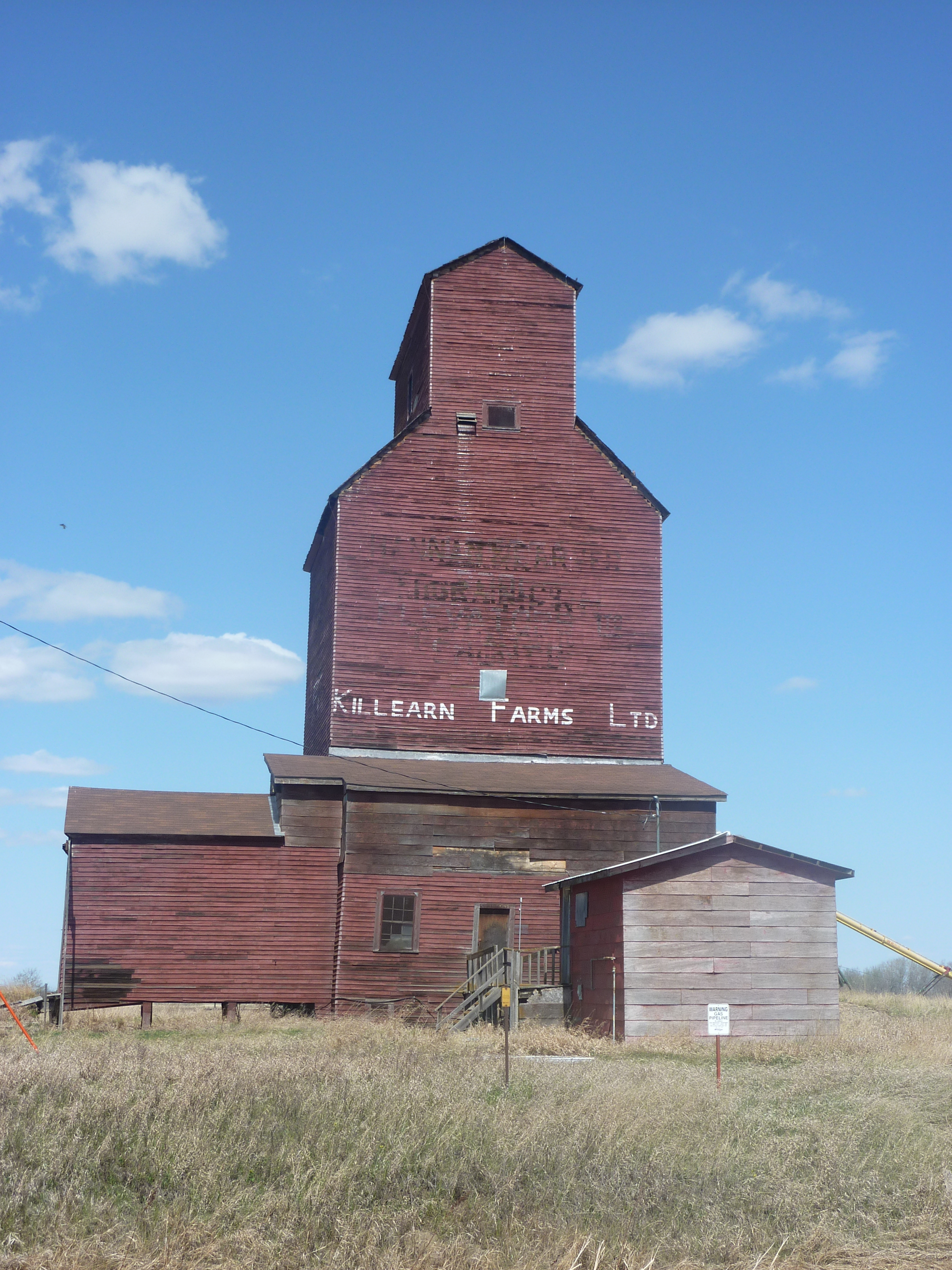
- Killean Farms Ltd. grain elevator in Shonts

- Logo

- Location within Alberta
- Coordinates: 53°15′N 112°14′W
- Country: Canada
- Province: Alberta
- Region: Central Alberta
- Census division: 10
- Established: 1943
- Incorporated: 1958

Government
  - Reeve: Eugene Hrabec
  - Governing body: Beaver County Council: Kevin Smook; Lionel Williams; Shawn O'Shea; Dale Pederson
  - CAO: Kayleena Spiess
  - Administrative office: Ryley

Area (2021)
  - Land: 3,219.74 km^{2} (1,243.15 sq mi)

Population (2021)
  - Total: 5,868
  - Density: 1.8/km^{2} (4.7/sq mi)
- Time zone: UTC−06:00 (Alberta Time)
- Postal code span: T0B
- Website: beaver.ab.ca

Beaver County is a municipal district in central-east Alberta, Canada. It is centred on Holden in the western part of Census Division No. 10. Its municipal office is located in Ryley.

Beaver County was incorporated as a municipal district on July 31, 1999, and the name was changed from "County of Beaver No. 9" to "Beaver County".

== Geography ==
=== Communities and localities ===
The following urban municipalities are surrounded by Beaver County.

Cities

- none

Towns

- Tofield
- Viking

Villages

- Holden
- Ryley

Summer villages

- none

The following hamlets are located within Beaver County.

Hamlets

- Bruce
- Kinsella

The following localities are located within Beaver County.

Localities

- Aspen Estates
- Bardo
- Beaver Creek Estates
- Beaver Meadow Estates
- Beaverhill Estates
- Birch Grove Estates
- Cinnamon Ridge Estates
- Country Squire
- Dodds
- El Greco Estates
- Forest Glenn
- Haight
- Islet Lake Estates
- Joyland and Jade Estates
- Kingsway Estates

- Lindbrook
- Lindbrook Estates
- Lori Estates
- Meadowbrook Estates
- Miquelon Estates
- Park Glen Estates
- Philips
- Phillips
- Poe
- Rolling Glory Estates
- Royal Glenn Estates
- Shonts
- Torlea
- Whispering Hills

== Demographics ==
In the 2021 Census of Population conducted by Statistics Canada, Beaver County had a population of 5,868 living in 2,180 of its 2,434 total private dwellings, a change of −0.6% from its 2016 population of 5,905. With a land area of 3,219.74 km^{2} (1,243.15 sq mi), it had a population density of 1.8/km^{2} (4.7/sq mi) in 2021.

In the 2016 Census of Population conducted by Statistics Canada, Beaver County had a population of 5,905 living in 2,177 of its 2,381 total private dwellings, a 3.8% change from its 2011 population of 5,689. With a land area of 3,317.57 km^{2} (1,280.92 sq mi), it had a population density of 1.8/km^{2} (4.6/sq mi) in 2016.

== Attractions ==
Two parks with campgrounds are located in the county's limits, Black Nugget Lake (located between Tofield and Ryley, south of Highway 14) and Camp Lake (located east of Viking, between Kinsella and Innisfree).

== See also ==
- List of communities in Alberta
- List of municipal districts in Alberta
