= Division No. 10, Alberta =

Census division in Canada

Coordinates: 53°16′48″N 110°00′36″W

Division No. 10
- Census division in Alberta
- Country: Canada
- Province: Alberta

Area
  - Total: 20,450 km^{2} (7,900 sq mi)

Population (2021)
  - Total: 95,455
  - Density: 4.668/km^{2} (12.09/sq mi)

Division No. 10 is a census division in Alberta, Canada. It is located in the east-central portion of central Alberta and includes Alberta's portion of the City of Lloydminster.

== Census subdivisions ==
The following census subdivisions (municipalities or municipal equivalents) are located within Alberta's Division No. 10.

- Cities
  - Camrose
  - Lloydminster
- Towns
  - Bashaw
  - Bruderheim
  - Lamont
  - Mundare
  - Tofield
  - Two Hills
  - Vegreville
  - Vermilion
  - Viking
- Villages
  - Andrew
  - Bawlf
  - Bittern Lake
  - Chipman
  - Edberg
  - Hay Lakes
  - Holden
  - Innisfree
  - Kitscoty
  - Mannville
  - Marwayne
  - Myrnam
  - Paradise Valley
  - Rosalind
  - Ryley
- Municipal districts
  - Beaver County
  - Camrose County
  - Lamont County
  - Minburn No. 27, County of
  - Two Hills No. 21, County of
  - Vermilion River, County of
- Indian reserves
  - Makaoo (Part) 120

== Demographics ==
Historical population
Year	Pop.	±%
1991	78,491	—
1996	80,028	+2.0%
2001	83,061	+3.8%
2006	86,796	+4.5%
2011	93,039	+7.2%
2016	97,499	+4.8%
2021	95,455	−2.1%

In the 2021 Census of Population conducted by Statistics Canada, Division No. 10 had a population of 95,455 living in 38,161 of its 42,973 total private dwellings, a change of −2% from its 2016 population of 97,449. With a land area of 20,134.12 km^{2} (7,773.83 sq mi), it had a population density of 4.7/km^{2} (12.3/sq mi) in 2021.

== See also ==
- List of census divisions of Alberta
- List of communities in Alberta
