= Big Knife Provincial Park =

Provincial park in Alberta, Canada

- IUCN category II (national park)
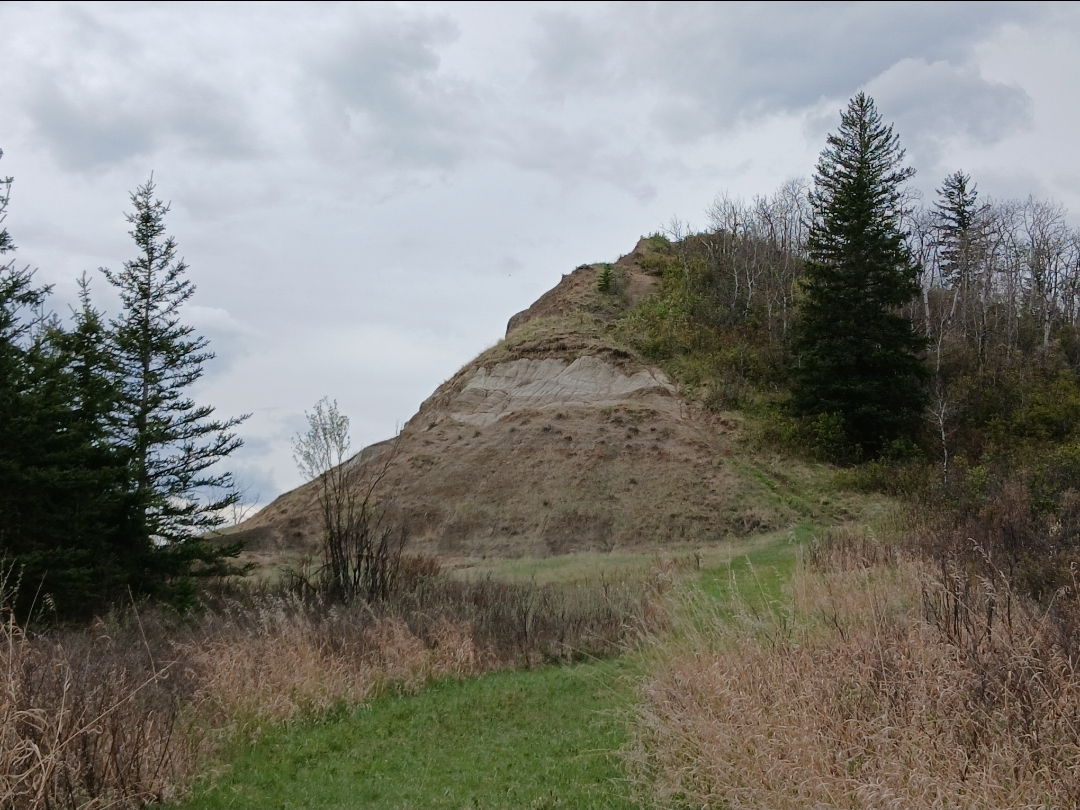
- Photograph of Big Knife Provincial Park

- Location within Alberta
- Interactive map of Big Knife Provincial Park
- Location: County of Paintearth No. 18, Alberta, Canada
- Nearest city: Forestburg, Camrose
- Coordinates: 52°29′23″N 112°12′38″W
- Area: 2.44 km^{2} (0.94 sq mi)
- Established: October 2, 1962
- Governing body: Alberta Tourism, Parks and Recreation

Big Knife Provincial Park is a small provincial park in central Alberta, Canada. It is located at the confluence between Big Knife Creek and the Battle River between the villages of Donalda and Forestburg, 10 km (6.2 mi) south of Highway 53, 88 km (55 mi) from the city of Camrose.

== History ==
The park gets its name from Big Knife Creek, which flows through the park. Sometime during the nineteenth century, a fight took place between a Cree man named Big Man and a Blackfoot warrior named Knife, where both of them died. The name "Big Knife" appears in the maps of Anthony Henday, who explored the region in 1874. The name of the creek was changed to White Man's Creek during the late 1800s but was later changed back to its original name. From the 1900s up until the 1920s, the area that would later become the park was settled by multiple people, including a gang of cattle rustlers led by Jack Dubois, who used the area as a hideout, as well as a man named One-Eyed Jack Nelson, who raised cattle and made his own moonshine which he sold. Evidence of these early settlers can still be found in the park, including the remains of Jack Nelson's cabin and the remnants of old gravesites and water stills. Although the park was established in 1962, development for the park began in 1963, when roads, footbridges, and campsites were made by Alberta Parks. The entire park was opened to the public in 1972. In 2022, land which have previously been leased by the government for the park was donated by a private company.

== Activities ==
Many activities in the park are water related and include canoeing, kayaking, swimming, fishing, and power boating. Birdwatching and camping at the Big Knife Campground are also popular. The park is open during the summer (from May to September), with only limited access during the winter months.

== Flora and Fauna ==
The park is home to a variety of birdlife, with common birds during the summer including Yellow-bellied sapsucker, Spotted towhee, Eastern phoebe, Turkey vulture, and Grey catbird. Year round birds include Bald eagle, Black-capped chickadee, Ruffed grouse, and Common goldeneye. Mammals in the park include Elk, Moose, North American porcupine, Canadian beaver, and Richardson's ground squirrel. The park has a great diversity of insects, including 560 species of moths and butterflies. Lepidoptera species present in the park include Subdued quaker, Oblique rover, White triangle tortrix, Large ruby tiger moth, Purple arches, Dun skipper, Woodland skipper, and Coral hairstreak. The park has a unique mix of flora owing to its varied terrain between badlands, Aspen forest, and shrubby grassland. Badlands species that can be found in the park include Brittle pricklypear, Small-flowered beardtongue, Longleaf wormwood, Scarlet globemallow, and Textile onion. Plants typical of the Aspen parkland forests in the park include Red baneberry, Fireberry hawthorn, Wild bergamot, Canada mayflower, Woodland strawberry, and Red raspberry. Grassland plants found in the park include Longbeak sedge, Golden Corydalis, Flodman's thistle, Hillside arnica, Rough fescue, Curlycup gumweed, and Poverty weed.

== See also ==
- List of provincial parks in Alberta
- List of Canadian provincial parks
- List of National Parks of Canada
