= Alberta Highway 53 =

Highway in Alberta, Canada

Highway 53
- Highway 53 highlighted in red

Route information
- Maintained by the Ministry of Transportation and Economic Corridors
- Length: 222.2 km (138.1 mi)

Major junctions
- West end: Highway 22 in Clearwater County
- Highway 20 in Rimbey; Highway 2 near Ponoka; Highway 2A in Ponoka; Highway 21 near Bashaw; Highway 56 near Donalda
- East end: Highway 36 / Highway 608 near Forestburg

Location
- Country: Canada
- Province: Alberta
- Specialized and rural municipalities: Clearwater County, Ponoka County, Camrose County, Stettler No. 6 County, Flagstaff County
- Towns: Rimbey, Ponoka, Bashaw
- Villages: Donalda, Forestburg

Highway system
- Alberta Numbered Highway Network; List; Former
← Highway 52	→ Highway 54

Alberta Provincial Highway No. 53, commonly referred to as Highway 53, is an east–west highway of approximately 222 km (138 mi) in central Alberta, Canada.

From the west, Highway 53 begins at Highway 22 (Cowboy Trail) and ends at Highway 36 (Veterans Memorial Highway), passing through the communities of Rimbey, Ponoka, Bashaw, Donalda, and Forestburg. It crosses the Medicine River and Blindman River west of Rimbey, and crosses the Battle River three times between Rimbey and Forestburg (west of Ponoka, within Ponoka, and between Donalda and Forestburg). Highway 53 also provides access to Big Knife Provincial Park southwest of Forestburg.

== Major intersections ==
Rural/specialized municipality	Location	km	mi	Destinations	Notes
Clearwater County		0.0	0.0	Highway 22 – Drayton Valley, Rocky Mountain House	Highway 53 western terminus
Ponoka County		15.1	9.4	Highway 761 south	West end of Highway 761 concurrency
Ponoka County		24.9	15.5	Highway 761 north	East end of Highway 761 concurrency
Ponoka County		36.3	22.6	Highway 766 south – Eckville	
Ponoka County		42.7	26.5	Crosses the Blindman River	
Rimbey		44.4	27.6	51 Street (Highway 20A north) to Highway 53 east	Most direct continuation of Highway 53 follows Highway 20A north; officially Highway 53 continues east on 50 Avenue
Rimbey		46.0	28.6	Highway 20 – Bentley, Sylvan Lake	
Gap in route
Ponoka County		47.6	29.6	Highway 20 – Breton, Rimbey	
Ponoka County		55.7	34.6	Highway 771 north – Pigeon Lake Provincial Park	West end of Highway 771 concurrency
Ponoka County		59.0	36.7	Highway 771 south – Bentley	East end of Highway 771 concurrency
Ponoka County	Crestomere	69.5– 69.7	43.2– 43.3	Highway 792 – Gull Lake	Intersections are offset; Highway 792 concurrency for 200 m (660 ft)
Ponoka County		83.7	52.0	Crosses the Battle River	
Ponoka County		84.5	52.5	Highway 795 north – Usona, Calmar	
Ponoka		87.8	54.6	Highway 2 – Edmonton, Red Deer, Calgary	Interchange; Highway 2 exit 450
Ponoka		91.6	56.9	Highway 2A – Wetaskiwin, Lacombe, Red Deer	
Ponoka		92.9	57.7	Crosses the Battle River	
Ponoka County		96.0	59.7	Highway 815 south – Joffre	
Ponoka County		110.8	68.8	Highway 821 south – Tees	
Ponoka County		120.4	74.8	Highway 822 north	
Camrose County		136.0	84.5	Highway 21 north – Camrose	West end of Highway 21 concurrency
Camrose County	Bashaw	142.2	88.4	UAR 206 east (50 Avenue)	
Camrose County	Bashaw	143.0	88.9	Highway 605 west Highway 21 south – Three Hills	East end Highway 21 concurrency
↑ / ↓		162.4	100.9	Highway 56 – Camrose, Stettler	
County of Stettler No. 6	Donalda	170.6	106.0	Highway 850 south	
County of Stettler No. 6		178.9	111.2	Highway 854 north – Rosalind, Bawlf	
↑ / ↓		187.2	116.3	Crosses the Battle River	
Flagstaff County		196.3	122.0	Highway 855 north – Heisler, Daysland	West end of Highway 855 concurrency
Flagstaff County		197.9	123.0	Highway 855 south – Big Knife Provincial Park, Halkirk	East end of Highway 855 concurrency
Flagstaff County	Forestburg	206.0	128.0	Highway 856 north (53 Street) – Strome	
Flagstaff County		215.7	134.0	Highway 861 south – Galahad	
Flagstaff County		222.2	138.1	Highway 36 – Killam, Castor Highway 608 east	Highway 53 eastern terminus; continues as Highway 608
1.000 mi = 1.609 km; 1.000 km = 0.621 mi: Concurrency terminus
