= Battle River Railway =

Co-operative railway in Alberta, Canada

Overview
- Reporting mark: BRR
- Dates of operation: 2010–
- Predecessor: Canadian National Railway branch

Technical
- Track gauge: 4 ft 8 1/2 in (1,435 mm) standard gauge
- Length: 60 miles (97 km)

The Battle River Railway is a co-operative shortline freight railway created in 2010 in central Alberta. The track is 236 foot-continually welded track. It serves the communities of Alliance, Galahad, Forestburg, Heisler, Rosalind, Kelsey, providing them with a rail connection to the Canadian National line in Camrose which connects to port facilities in Vancouver and Prince Rupert, British Columbia.

Formerly, the Battle River Producer Car Group, a collective of 180 farmers, operated as a loader of grain cars only, but in May 2009, it became the Battle River Railway New Generation Co-operative, and purchased the branch line from CN in 2010.

From 2014 onward, heritage tours were introduced on the line using a Pullman Company-built coach, offering themed excursions several times a year. The general manager is Matthew Enright. The founding members of the friends of the Battle River Railway are Joanne McMahon and Ken Eshpeter.
