= Lorraine, Alberta =

Unincorporated community in Alberta, Canada

Lorraine
- Unincorporated community
- A present day photograph of Lorraine, Alberta
- Interactive map of Lorraine
- Location within Alberta Location within Canada
- Coordinates: 52.333°N 111.588°W
- Country: Canada
- Province: Alberta
- County: Flagstaff County
- First settled: 1905
- Decline: 1920s

Government
  - Postmaster: Edward Wimmer

Lorraine is an unincorporated community in Flagstaff County, Alberta, Canada. It was established in 1905 and had a growing population in 1914 before its decline in the 1920s. Today, very little remains.

== Toponymy ==
Lorraine got its name from Lorraine Wimmer, the daughter of its first postmaster, named Edward Wimmer.

== History ==
=== Founding and growing community: 1905 - 1920s ===
Lorraine was first established by settlers around 1905. At that time it was known as the Lorraine District. There were expectations that a railway would start at the settlement and end in Youngstown, encouraging people to come to the area and build a community. In March 1907, a post office opened at the area, which operated for another 13 years.

The construction of the Lorraine Bridge in 1914

The population increased in 1914 when a railway bridge was built across the Battle River. In 1915, a range of structural buildings were constructed at the settlement, which included two general stores, a lumber yard, a restaurant, a real estate, a blacksmith shop, a pool, and a dance hall. The railway reached Alliance in January 1916, and multiple business owners began to move their businesses to Alliance, including the buildings. In 1919, the Lorraine school district was established, and a local, known as Bob Greenly, constructed the school.

=== Decline: 1920s ===
Decline followed in the 1920s. In June 1920, the post office closed down, and in 1923, the school was moved 3 km (1.9 mi) west.

== Present day ==
Today, very little remains. A man made water pond remains at the site, presumably used to collect water for the town, but is now used for cattle. The pillars for the bridge still remain standing, but the bridge in general has entirely disappeared. Overall, the original settlement has entirely disappeared.
