= Woodglen =

Woodglen may refer to:

- Woodglen, Alberta, Canada
- Woodglen, New Jersey, USA
