= Peninsula Lake (Alberta) =

Lake in Alberta, Canada

- Location within Alberta
- Location: Flagstaff County, Alberta
- Coordinates: 52°51′36″N 111°29′08″W
- Basin countries: Canada
- Max. length: 1.7 km (1.1 mi)
- Max. width: 1.9 km (1.2 mi)
- Surface area: 1.39 km^{2} (0.54 sq mi)
- Average depth: 2.1 m (6 ft 11 in)
- Max. depth: 3.1 m (10 ft)
- Surface elevation: 656 m (2,152 ft)
- References: Peninsula Lake

Peninsula Lake is a lake in Alberta, Canada. The lake is located 160 km southeast of the city of Edmonton. The salinity of Peninsula Lake causes characteristics such as temperature, nutrient concentrations and plant and animal communities to contrast with those from freshwater lakes. The lake is contains high levels of sulphate, sodium and bicarbonate/carbonate concentrations which, are produced by saline groundwater in the region. In winter, the temperature of water under the ice drops to 0 °C, extremely low, even for Alberta lakes. Although the lake contains high mineral levels, plant growth is sparse. A few planktonic invertebrates are exceptionally abundant, but there are fewer species than in freshwater lakes. There are no fish living in the lake.
