= Bellshill, Alberta =

Unincorporated community in Alberta, Canada

Bellshill
- Bellshill School (1908-1909 - 1942)

- Location within Alberta Location within Canada
- Coordinates: 52.579°N 111.526°W
- Country: Canada
- Province: Alberta
- County: Flagstaff County
- First settled: 1900s

Government
  - Postmaster: Archibald Brown
- Time zone: Alberta Time
- Area code: 780

Bellshill is an unincorporated community in Flagstaff County, Alberta, Canada, situated along Highway 608. Bellshill is located about 24 km (15 mi) from Sedgewick. Bellshill is a historic settlement which had its early beginnings in the early 1900s, and, in 1908 or 1909, a historic schoolhouse was constructed on the hill, which closed in 1942. It has a lake called Bellshill Lake, a major migratory waterfowl staging area.

== Toponymy ==
Bellshill was named around the early 1900s after the first postmaster (Archibald Brown)'s wife, named Isabel Brown. Brown referred to her as "Bell", thus naming the locality "Bellshill".

== History ==
Bellshill had a post office which operated from June 1907 to July 1930. In 1908-1909, a schoolhouse was built at Bellshill, along with a baseball backstop for recess games. However, in 1942, the Bellshill School closed after 32-33 years of service.

== Present day ==
Today, little remains. Bellshill serves as a natural gas and power generation facility now, but the Bellshill schoolhouse and baseball backstop still stand, maintaining the former town's legacy. The Lougheed Colony School, located in Bellshill, is still regularly attended.

== Attractions ==
Bellshill Lake

Bellshill has a relatively shallow lake, covering a surface area of 27.81 km^{2} (10.74 sq mi). Every year, especially in October, hundreds of thousands of geese, mostly snow geese, greater white-fronted geese, ross's geese, and Canada geese might also be abundant. The lake is called Bellshill Lake.
