= Castor Creek =

Castor Creek may refer to:

- Castor Creek (Little River tributary), a stream in Louisiana
- Castor Creek (Alberta), a stream in Alberta, Canada

== See also ==
- Castor River (disambiguation)
