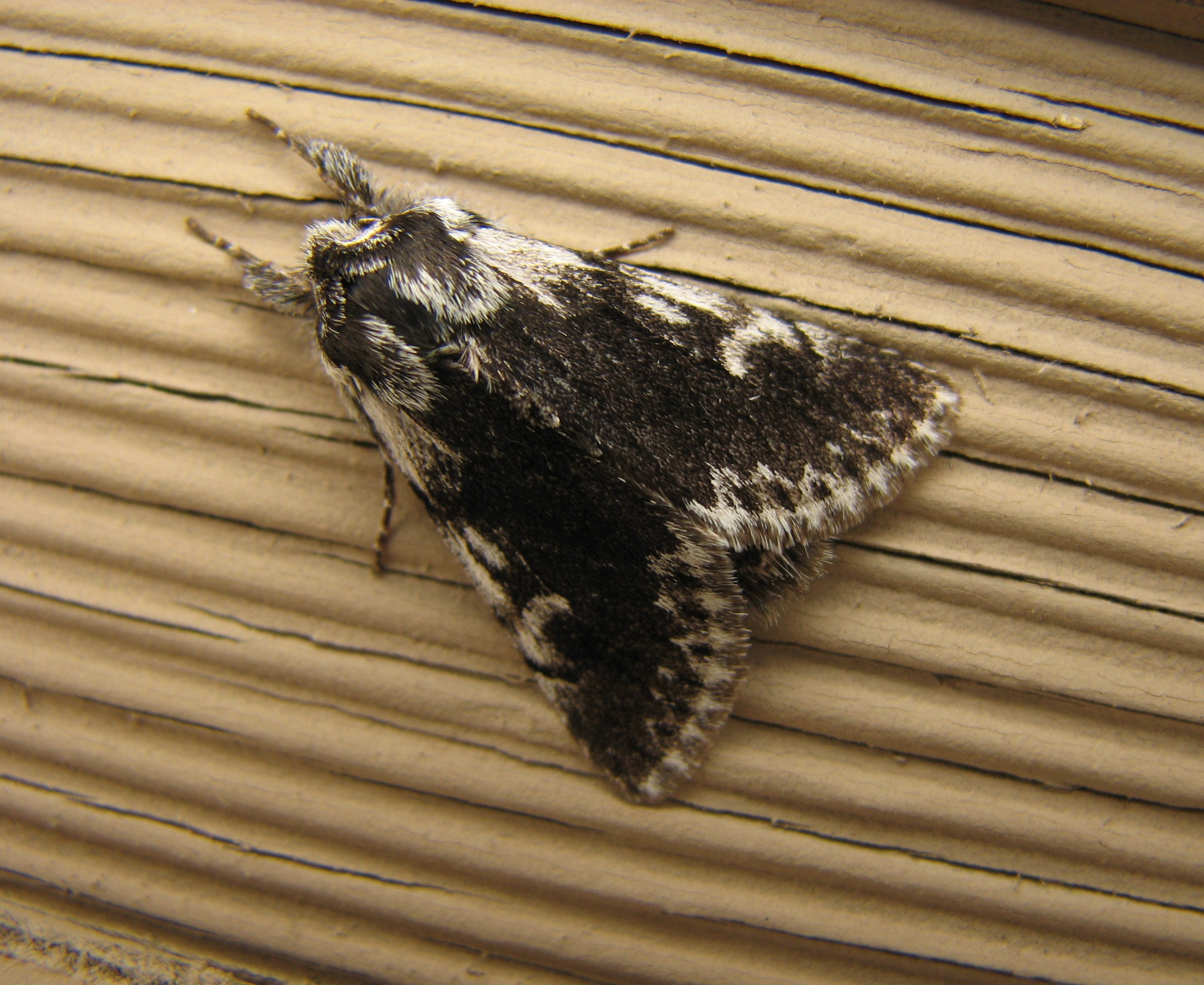
- Pleromelloida conserta

Scientific classification
- Domain: Eukaryota
- Kingdom: Animalia
- Phylum: Arthropoda
- Class: Insecta
- Order: Lepidoptera
- Superfamily: Noctuoidea
- Family: Noctuidae
- Subfamily: Oncocnemidinae
- Genus: Pleromelloida; Nye, 1975

= Pleromelloida =

Genus of moths

Pleromelloida is a genus of moths of the family Noctuidae.

== Species ==
- Pleromelloida arizonata (Barnes & Benjamin, 1922)
- Pleromelloida bonuscula (J.B. Smith, 1898)
- Pleromelloida cinerea (J.B. Smith, 1904)
- Pleromelloida conserta (Grote, 1881)
