= Medicine River (Alberta) =

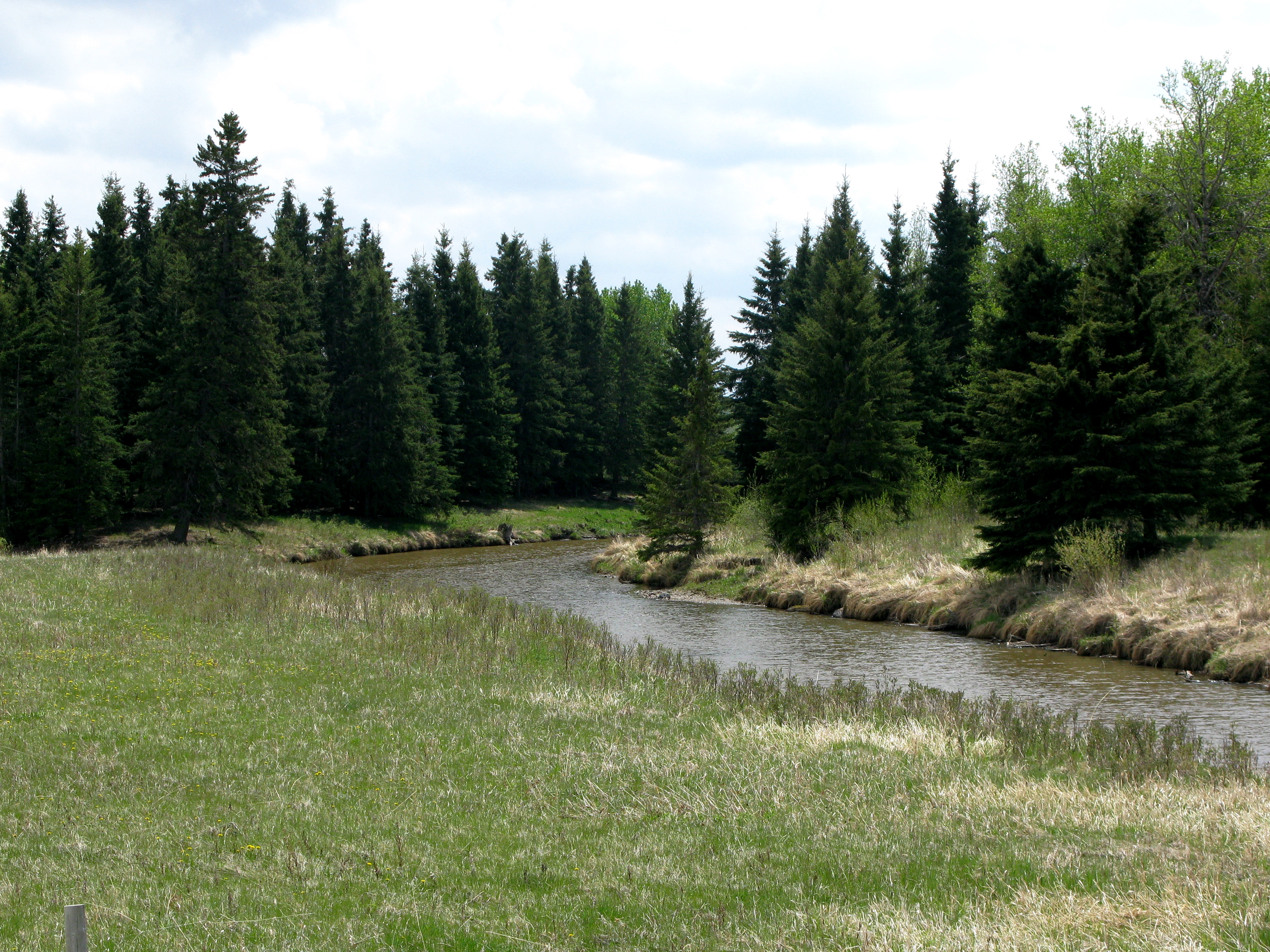
- The Medicine River from Alberta Highway 53

Location
- Country: Canada
- Province: Alberta

Physical characteristics
- Source
  - location: Medicine Lake
  - coordinates: 52°43′54″N 114°43′53″W
  - elevation: 982 m (3,222 ft)
- Mouth
  - location: Red Deer River
  - coordinates: 52°03′36″N 114°05′56″W
  - elevation: 894 m (2,933 ft)

The Medicine River is a medium-sized river in central Alberta. It begins at the outlet of Medicine Lake, north of Rocky Mountain House. The Medicine River initially travels through the Rocky Mountain House Grazing Reserve, a protected area with over 15,000 acres (61 km^{2}) of land set aside for cattle grazing and recreation. The river flows southeast, taking on a number of creeks before passing Eckville. The Medicine River joins the Red Deer River north of Innisfail, downstream of the Dickson Dam, at the Medicine Flats. The Medicine is bridged by Alberta highways 53, 12, 11, and 54.

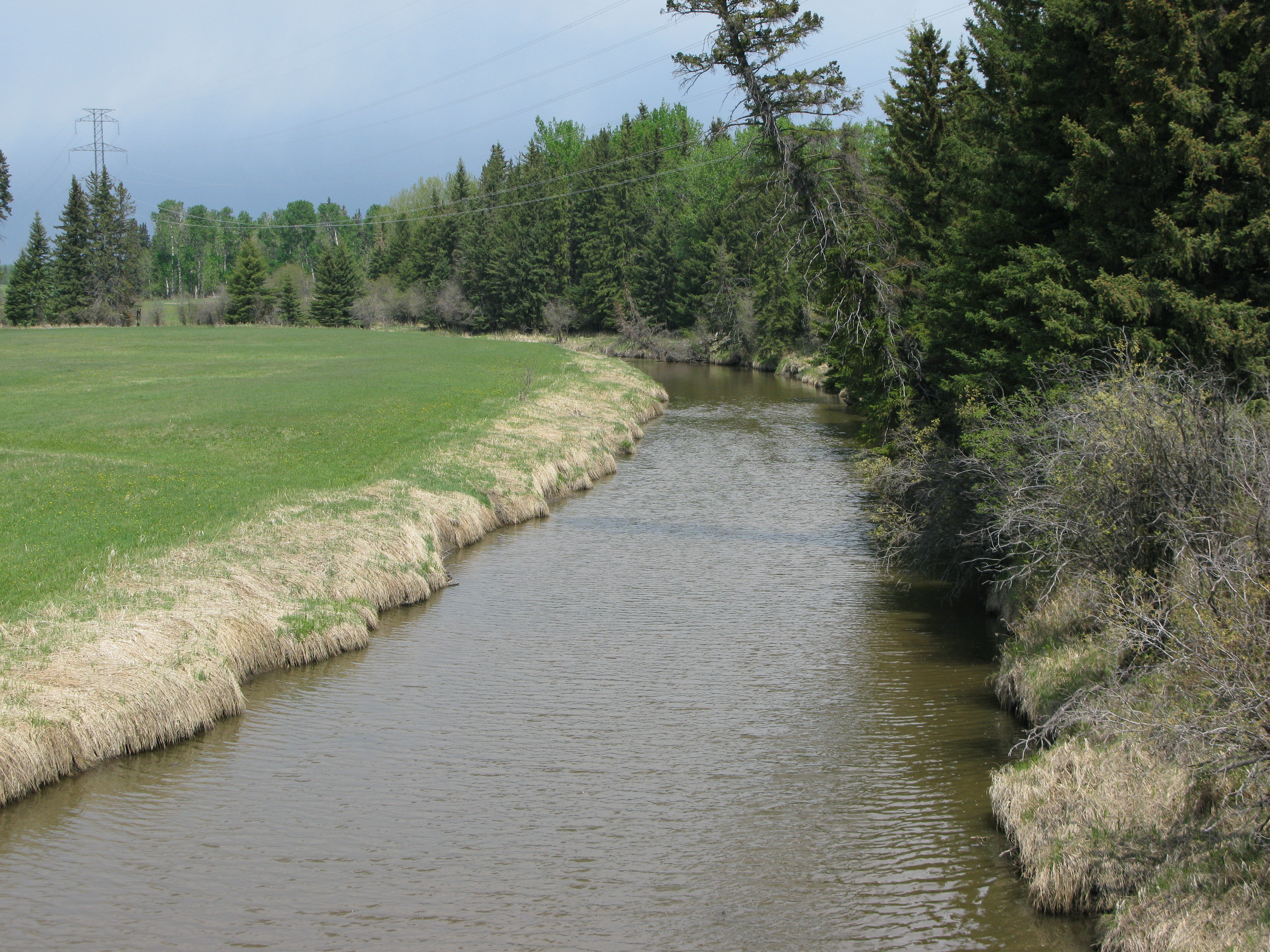
The Medicine River outside Rimbey, Alberta

The name Medicine River is a translation from the Cree words muskiki and nipagwasimow, or Sundance river. It first appeared on a John Arrowsmith map in 1859.

== Tributaries ==
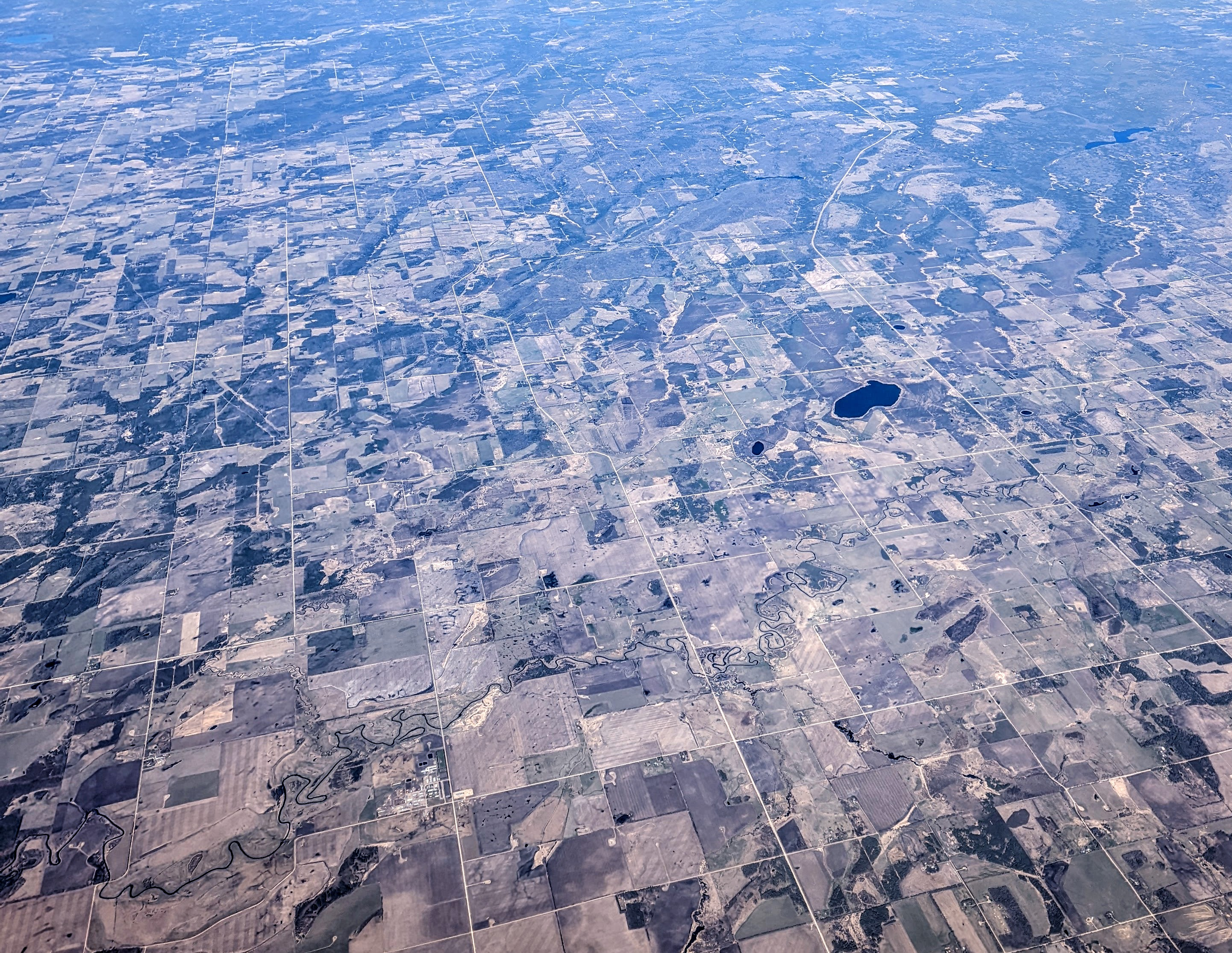
The Medicine River in Alberta, Canada, meandering through Leedale, Ponoka County, with Medicine Lake source at upper right

- Open Creek
- Wilson Creek
- Welch Creek
  - Block Creek
- Wood Lake
- Blueberry Creek
  - Lobstick Creek
- Lasthill Creek
- Tindastoll Creek
- Dickson Creek

== See also ==
- List of Alberta rivers
