= Battle Lake (Alberta) =

Lake in Alberta, Canada

- Location within Alberta
- Location: County of Wetaskiwin No. 10, Alberta
- Coordinates: 52°58′06″N 114°11′21″W
- Primary inflows: Battle River
- Primary outflows: Battle River
- Basin countries: Canada
- Max. length: 7.7 km (4.8 mi)
- Max. width: 0.6 km (0.37 mi)
- Surface area: 4.56 km^{2} (1.76 sq mi)
- Average depth: 6.9 m (23 ft)
- Max. depth: 13.1 m (43 ft)
- Surface elevation: 843 m (2,766 ft)

Battle Lake is a lake in Alberta, Canada. It is located in the County of Wetaskiwin No. 10 approximately 100 km (62 mi) southwest of Edmonton. A locality by the same name is located just east of the lake, the lake is said to be named after a particularly aggressive battle between the Cree and Blackfeet indigenous peoples of North America, the site of the actual battle allegedly occurred on the very east marsh of the lake, although details on the battle remain scarce due to the fact that it is primarily known about only due to tales from European settlers. . Battle River originates in the lake.

== See also ==
- List of lakes in Alberta
