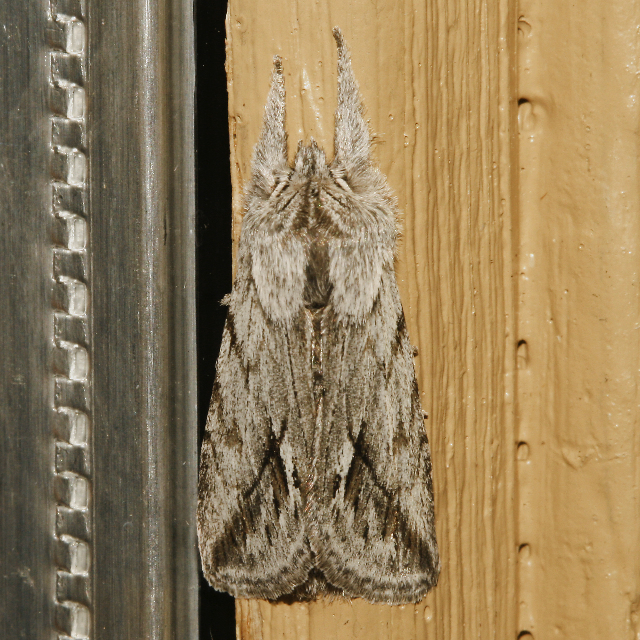

Scientific classification
- Domain: Eukaryota
- Kingdom: Animalia
- Phylum: Arthropoda
- Class: Insecta
- Order: Lepidoptera
- Superfamily: Noctuoidea
- Family: Noctuidae
- Genus: Pleromelloida
- Species: P. cinerea

Binomial name
- Pleromelloida cinerea (Smith, 1904)

= Pleromelloida cinerea =

Species of moth

Pleromelloida cinerea, the ashy pleromelloida, is a species of moth in the family Noctuidae (the owlet moths). It is found in North America.

The MONA or Hodges number for Pleromelloida cinerea is 10031.
