= Castor River =

Castor River may refer to:

- Castor River (Ontario), Canada
- Rivière au Castor, Quebec, Canada
- Castor River (Missouri), United States

== See also ==
- Castor Creek (disambiguation)
