= Fabyan Trestle Bridge =

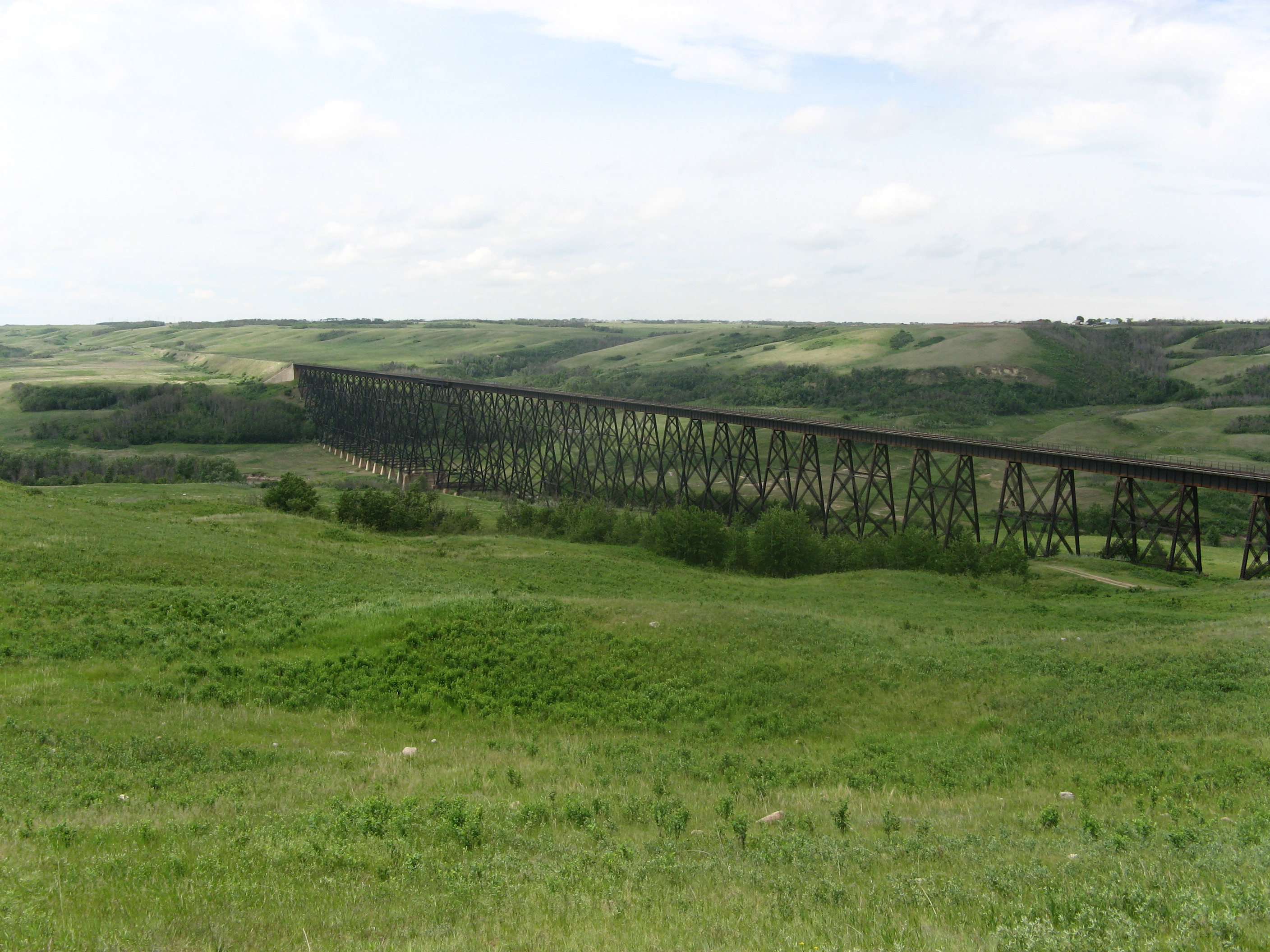
- Coordinates: 52°52′36″N 111°03′27″W
- Carries: Railway
- Crosses: Battle River
- Locale: Fabyan
- Official name: Battle River Railway Trestle
- Maintained by: Canadian National Railway

Characteristics
- Total length: 846 m (2,775 ft)
- Height: 59 m (195 ft)

History
- Construction start: 1907
- Construction end: December 10, 1908
- Opened: January 1909

Location
- Interactive map of Fabyan Trestle Bridge

The Battle River Railway Trestle, commonly known as the Fabyan Trestle Bridge, was built between 1907 and December 10, 1908 west of Fabyan, Alberta, Canada at the price of $600,000. The bridge location is at approximately mile 149 of Canadian National Railway's (CN) Wainwright subdivision.

== Overview ==
The steel trestle was designed by the Grand Trunk Pacific (GTP) railway as part of the company's westward construction to Edmonton. With the Battle River valley meandering west to east, a bridge had to be built in order to continue the westward trek, with its current location the most viable.

Upon completion, it was the largest railway structure in Canada until the Lethbridge Viaduct was completed in August 1909.

== History ==
In 1907, the concrete footings of the bridge were poured. With the help of local farmers and other contractors, supplies were hauled in by wagons from Hardisty until construction began on the eastern side of the valley where supplies could be delivered by rail.

After its completion, the first train to cross over was the one being used to build it, while the first transportation train to cross was in January 1909.

When GTP was nationalized in 1923, the bridge became part of the main line of the CN.

== Specifications ==
- Length: 846 metres (2,775 ft)
- Height: 59 metres (195 ft)

== Notable incidents ==
=== Construction deaths ===
During construction, three men died when their scow became swamped mid-stream. A cairn was later placed in their memory by their fellow workers.

=== 2012 derailment ===
On 21 January 2012, at 16:17 MT, 31 of a 137-car CN train going from Winnipeg to Edmonton derailed approximately halfway across the bridge. Of the 31 cars, 17 of them carrying wheat and barley fell to the valley below. CN originally reported that all the cars were grain cars; however, requests made by a local government official revealed that dangerous goods were also being hauled, but they did not derail.

=== 2017 derailment ===
On 17 October 2017, at 17:40 MT, a westbound CN train consisting of 13 cars and one engine derailed when it approached the west end of the trestle. The 13 cars fell to the valley below, with the locomotive staying on the bridge, but not on the tracks. The fallen cars supported intermodal containers (also known as shipping containers or Sea-Cans), all of which were damaged in the fall.

CN said that at the time of the derailment, the winds were in excess of 100 km/h.

As of 22 July 2022, no information can be found about this incident in the webpages of the Transportation Safety Board of Canada (TSB), or in the webpages of CN. However, the incident is referenced in the TSB investigation report R18W0133 as a similar incident involving hopper cars or empty double-stack containers derailing due to extremely high wind gusts.

== See also ==
- List of bridges in Canada
