= Pleromelloida bonuscula =

Scientific classification
- Domain: Eukaryota
- Kingdom: Animalia
- Phylum: Arthropoda
- Class: Insecta
- Order: Lepidoptera
- Superfamily: Noctuoidea
- Family: Noctuidae
- Genus: Pleromelloida
- Species: P. bonuscula

Binomial name
- Pleromelloida bonuscula (Smith, 1898)

Species of moth

Pleromelloida bonuscula is a species of moth in the family Noctuidae (the owlet moths). It is found in North America.

The MONA or Hodges number for Pleromelloida bonuscula is 10029.
