= Forestburg, Alberta =

Village in Alberta, Canada

Forestburg
- Village
- Village of Forestburg
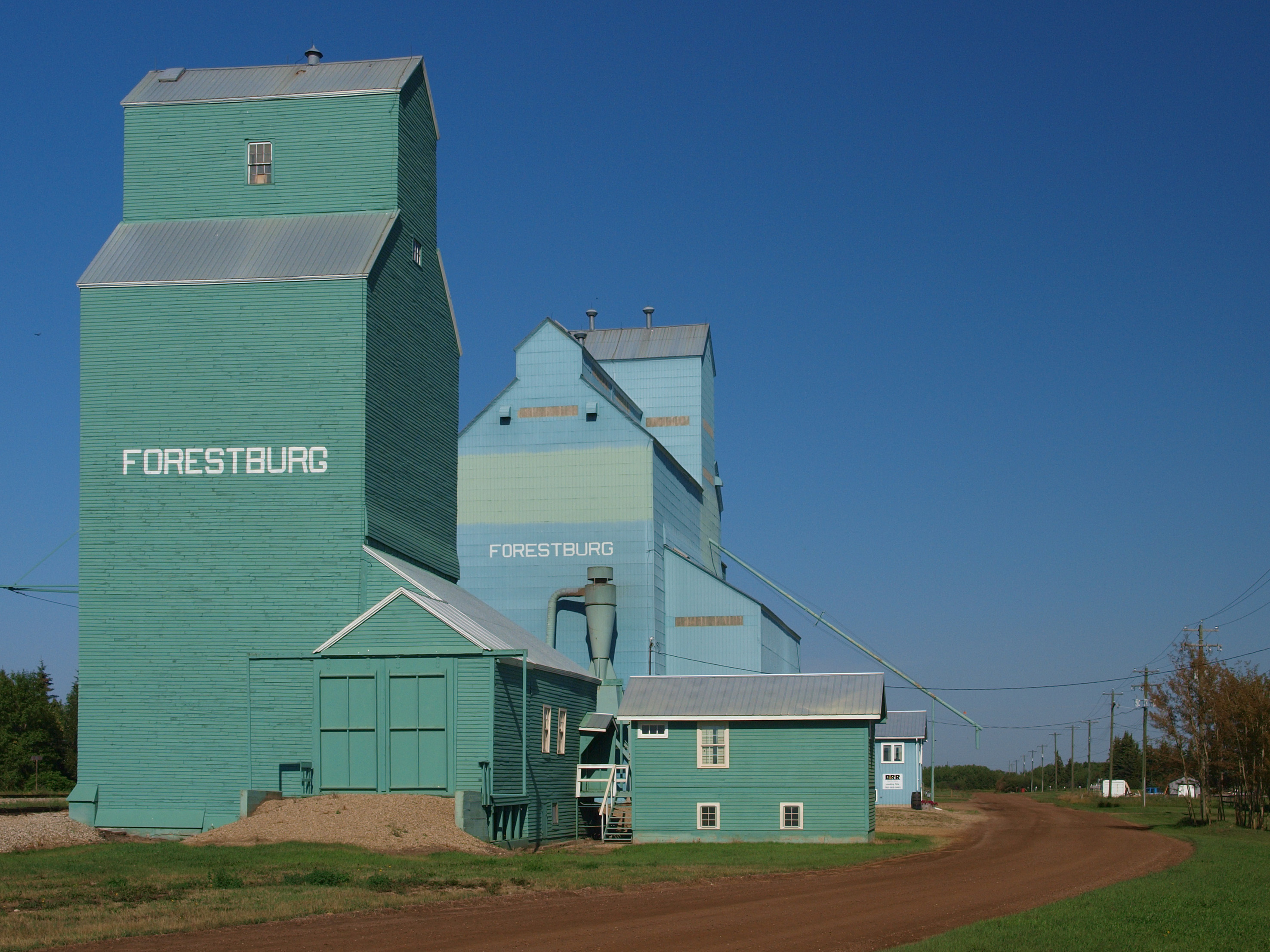
- Forestburg grain elevators

- Location of Forestburg in Alberta
- Coordinates: 52°34′49″N 112°04′05″W
- Country: Canada
- Province: Alberta
- Region: Central Alberta
- Census division: 7
- Municipal district: Flagstaff County
- Founded: 1916
- Incorporated
  - Village: August 21, 1919

Government
  - Mayor: Blaze Joseph Young
  - Governing body: Forestburg Village Council

Area (2021)
  - Land: 4.04 km^{2} (1.56 sq mi)
- Elevation: 662.90 m (2,174.9 ft)

Population (2021)
  - Total: 807
  - Density: 199.9/km^{2} (518/sq mi)
- Time zone: UTC−06:00 (Alberta Time)
- Highways: Highway 53
- Waterway: Battle River
- Website: Official website

Forestburg is a village located in east-central Alberta, Canada. The rich farmland of the area was first settled by Europeans in 1905. Soon after the first of many "gopher hole" mines, homesteaders were soon coal mining on the banks of the Battle River in 1907.

Forestburg's economy is based on agriculture, coal mining, oil and gas activity, and power generation. Forestburg has a variety of retail and services, with major employment by Atco Power Ltd. and Westmoreland Coal. The village is the headquarters of the Battle River Railway, a co-operative railway established in 2009.

== History ==
The site was surveyed in 1919 after the Canadian Northern Railway arrived in 1916, and Forestburg was incorporated into a village.

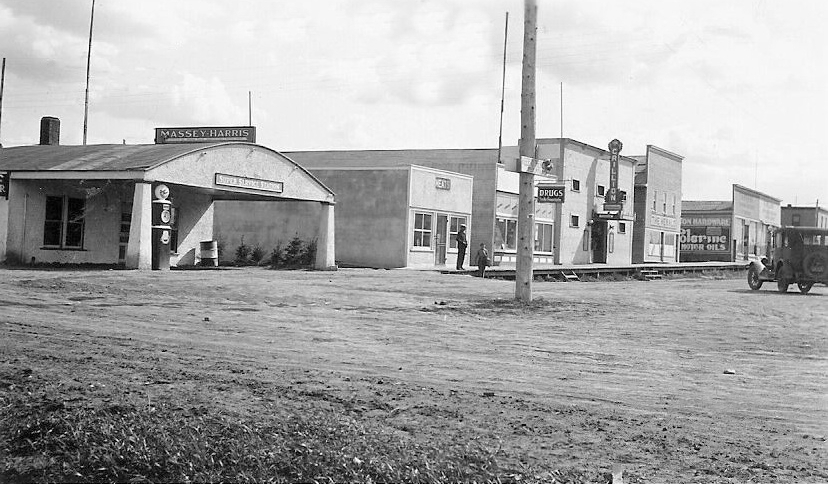
Forestburg, 1930s

== Geography ==
=== Climate ===
Climate data for Forestburg
Month	Jan	Feb	Mar	Apr	May	Jun	Jul	Aug	Sep	Oct	Nov	Dec	Year
Record high °C (°F)	11 (52)	15 (59)	20.6 (69.1)	30 (86)	35 (95)	34.4 (93.9)	36 (97)	37 (99)	35.6 (96.1)	29.5 (85.1)	20.5 (68.9)	14 (57)	37 (99)
Mean daily maximum °C (°F)	−6.8 (19.8)	−3.4 (25.9)	2.3 (36.1)	11.4 (52.5)	17.8 (64.0)	21.5 (70.7)	23.6 (74.5)	23.2 (73.8)	17.4 (63.3)	11.6 (52.9)	1 (34)	−5.1 (22.8)	9.5 (49.1)
Daily mean °C (°F)	−11.9 (10.6)	−8.5 (16.7)	−2.5 (27.5)	5.8 (42.4)	11.8 (53.2)	15.8 (60.4)	17.9 (64.2)	17.1 (62.8)	11.7 (53.1)	6 (43)	−3.5 (25.7)	−9.9 (14.2)	4.1 (39.4)
Mean daily minimum °C (°F)	−16.9 (1.6)	−13.6 (7.5)	−7.3 (18.9)	0.1 (32.2)	5.7 (42.3)	10 (50)	12.1 (53.8)	11 (52)	5.9 (42.6)	0.3 (32.5)	−7.9 (17.8)	−14.6 (5.7)	−1.3 (29.7)
Record low °C (°F)	−44.4 (−47.9)	−42.2 (−44.0)	−39.4 (−38.9)	−25.6 (−14.1)	−7 (19)	−3.3 (26.1)	4.4 (39.9)	0 (32)	−6.5 (20.3)	−21 (−6)	−32 (−26)	−45 (−49)	−45 (−49)
Average precipitation mm (inches)	17.4 (0.69)	11.3 (0.44)	16.5 (0.65)	22.3 (0.88)	46.1 (1.81)	79.1 (3.11)	73.2 (2.88)	58.4 (2.30)	38.3 (1.51)	15 (0.6)	13.3 (0.52)	15 (0.6)	402 (15.8)
Source: Environment Canada

== Demographics ==
In the 2021 Census of Population conducted by Statistics Canada, the Village of Forestburg had a population of 807 living in 373 of its 417 total private dwellings, a change of −8.3% from its 2016 population of 880. With a land area of 4.04 km^{2} (1.56 sq mi), it had a population density of 199.8/km^{2} (517.4/sq mi) in 2021.

In the 2016 Census of Population conducted by Statistics Canada, the Village of Forestburg recorded a population of 875 living in 360 of its 404 total private dwellings, a 5.3% change from its 2011 population of 831. With a land area of 2.73 km^{2} (1.05 sq mi), it had a population density of 320.5/km^{2} (830.1/sq mi) in 2016.

The population of the Village of Forestburg according to its 2014 municipal census is 880, a 5.9% change from its 2011 federal census population of 831.

== Notable people ==
- Evan Oberg, professional hockey player

== See also ==
- List of communities in Alberta
- List of francophone communities in Alberta
- List of villages in Alberta
