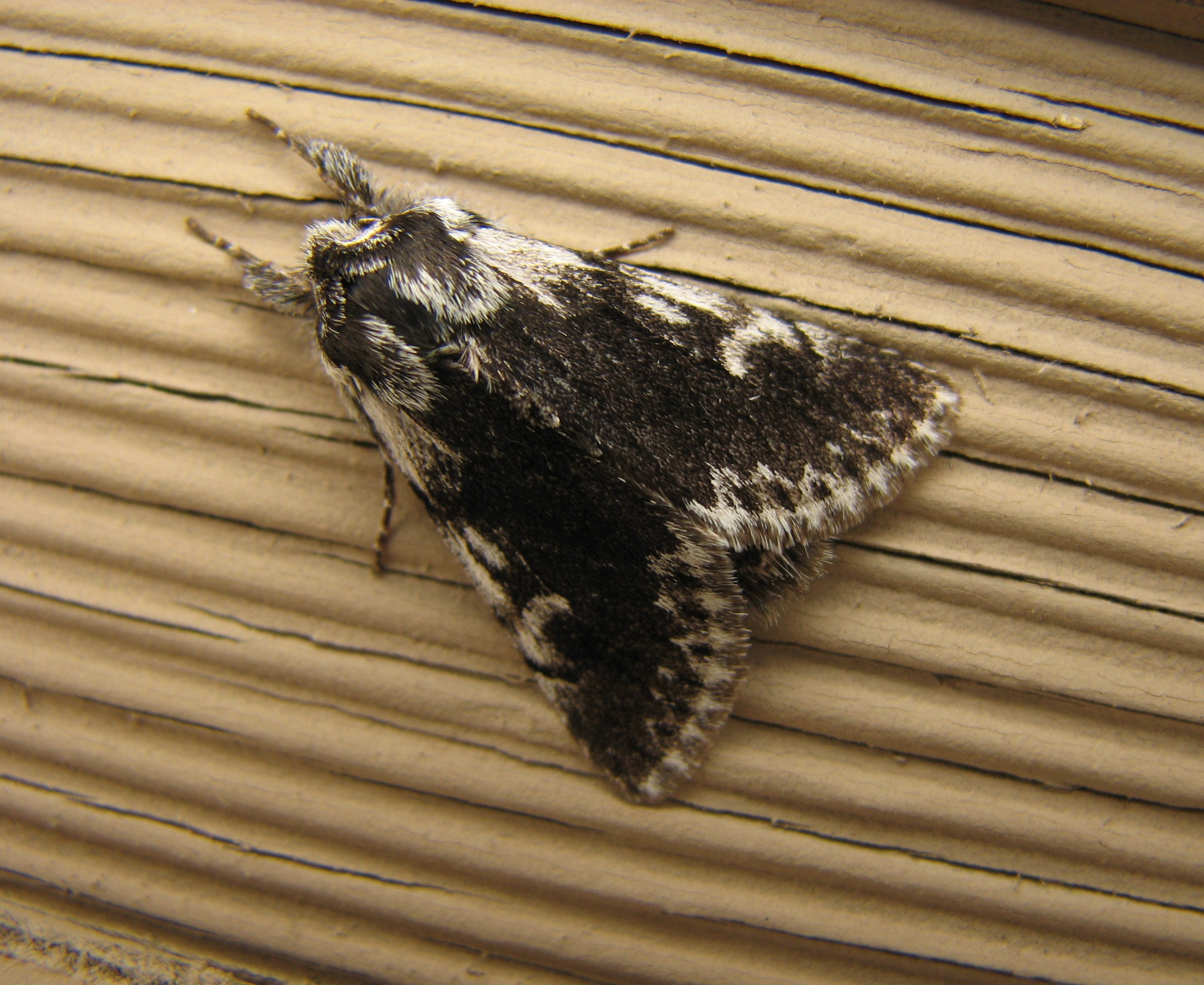

Scientific classification
- Domain: Eukaryota
- Kingdom: Animalia
- Phylum: Arthropoda
- Class: Insecta
- Order: Lepidoptera
- Superfamily: Noctuoidea
- Family: Noctuidae
- Genus: Pleromelloida
- Species: P. conserta

Binomial name
- Pleromelloida conserta (Grote, 1881)

Synonyms
- Pleromelloida apposita (J. B. Smith, 1892); Pleromelloida obliquata (J.B. Smith, 1891); Pleromelloida conserta smithi (Barnes & Benjamin, 1922); Pleromelloida smithi

= Pleromelloida conserta =

Species of moth

Pleromelloida conserta is a moth of the family Noctuidae first described by Augustus Radcliffe Grote in 1881. It is found in North America from British Columbia to California, east to Utah, north to Saskatchewan.

Until recently, the black form P. conserta and the grey form P. obliquata were treated as separate species.

The wingspan is 30–33 mm. Adults are on wing in spring. There is one generation per year.

The larvae feed on the leaves of Symphoricarpos species, including Symphoricarpos albus.
