= Castor, Alberta =

Town in Alberta, Canada

Castor
- Town
- Town of Castor
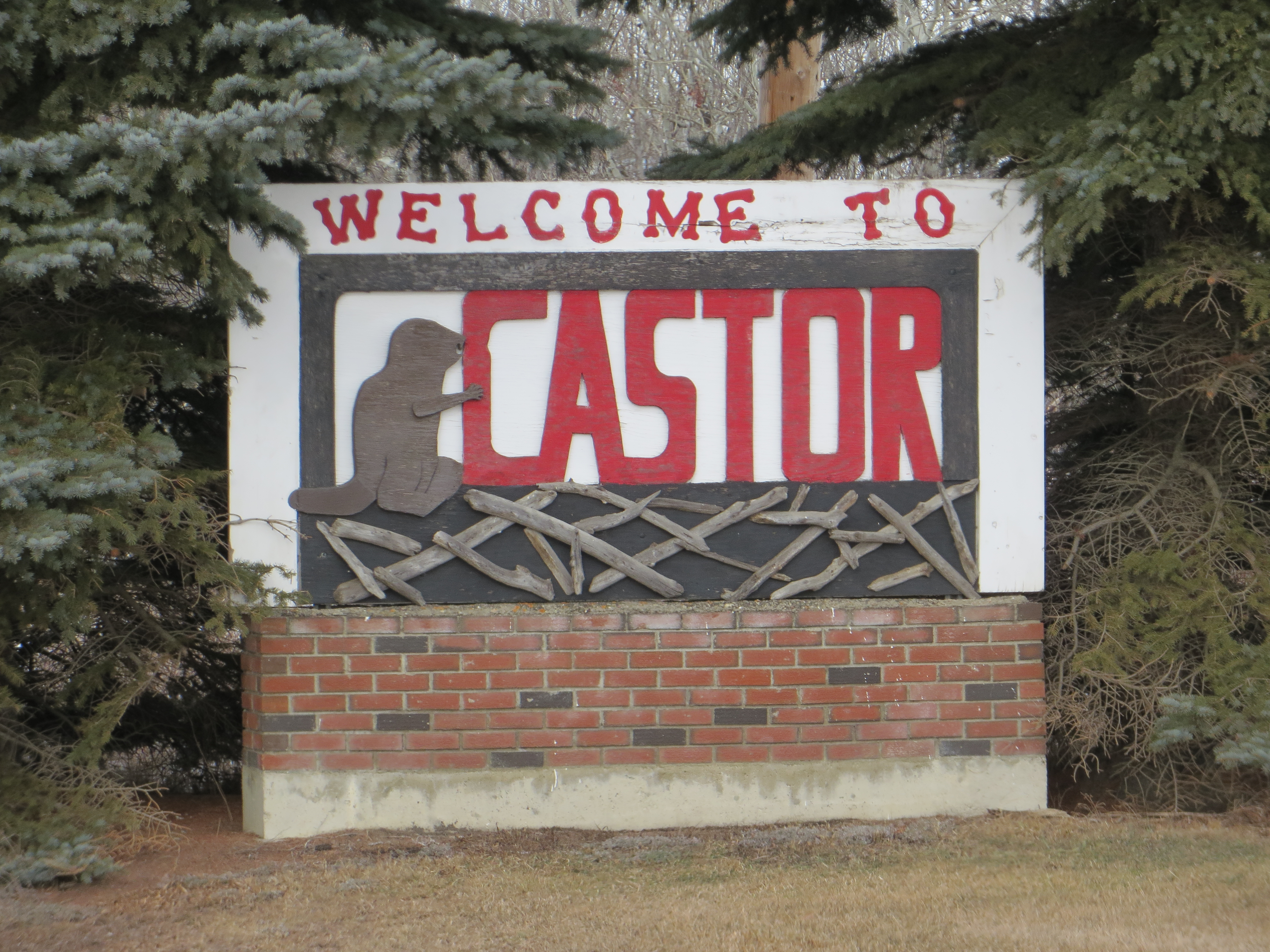
- Welcome sign in Castor

- Location of Castor in Alberta Castor (Canada)
- Coordinates: 52°13′12″N 111°54′34″W
- Country: Canada
- Province: Alberta
- Region: Central Alberta
- Census division: 7
- Municipal district: County of Paintearth No. 18
- Incorporated
  - Village: November 26, 1909
  - Town: June 27, 1910

Government
  - Mayor: Richard Elhard
  - Governing & body: Castor Town Council
  - MP: Pierre Poilievre
  - MLA: Nate Horner

Area (2021)
  - Land: 2.61 km^{2} (1.01 sq mi)
- Elevation: 816 m (2,677 ft)

Population (2021)
  - Total: 803
  - Density: 307.9/km^{2} (797/sq mi)
- Time zone: UTC−06:00 (Alberta Time)
- Postal code span: T0C 0X0
- Area codes: 403, 587
- Highways: Highway 12; Highway 36
- Waterways: Castor Creek
- Website: Official website

Castor is a tourist town in Alberta, Canada. It is located at the intersection of Highway 12 and Highway 861, approximately 143 kilometres (89 mi) east of the city of Red Deer. It has an elevation 816 metres (2,677 ft).

Castor is French (also Latin) for beaver. The town is known for its duck and geese migration in the fall since its territory includes many stopping points well frequented by migrating waterfowl. Just to the south of town, is an Important Bird Area at Sullivan Lake.

== History ==
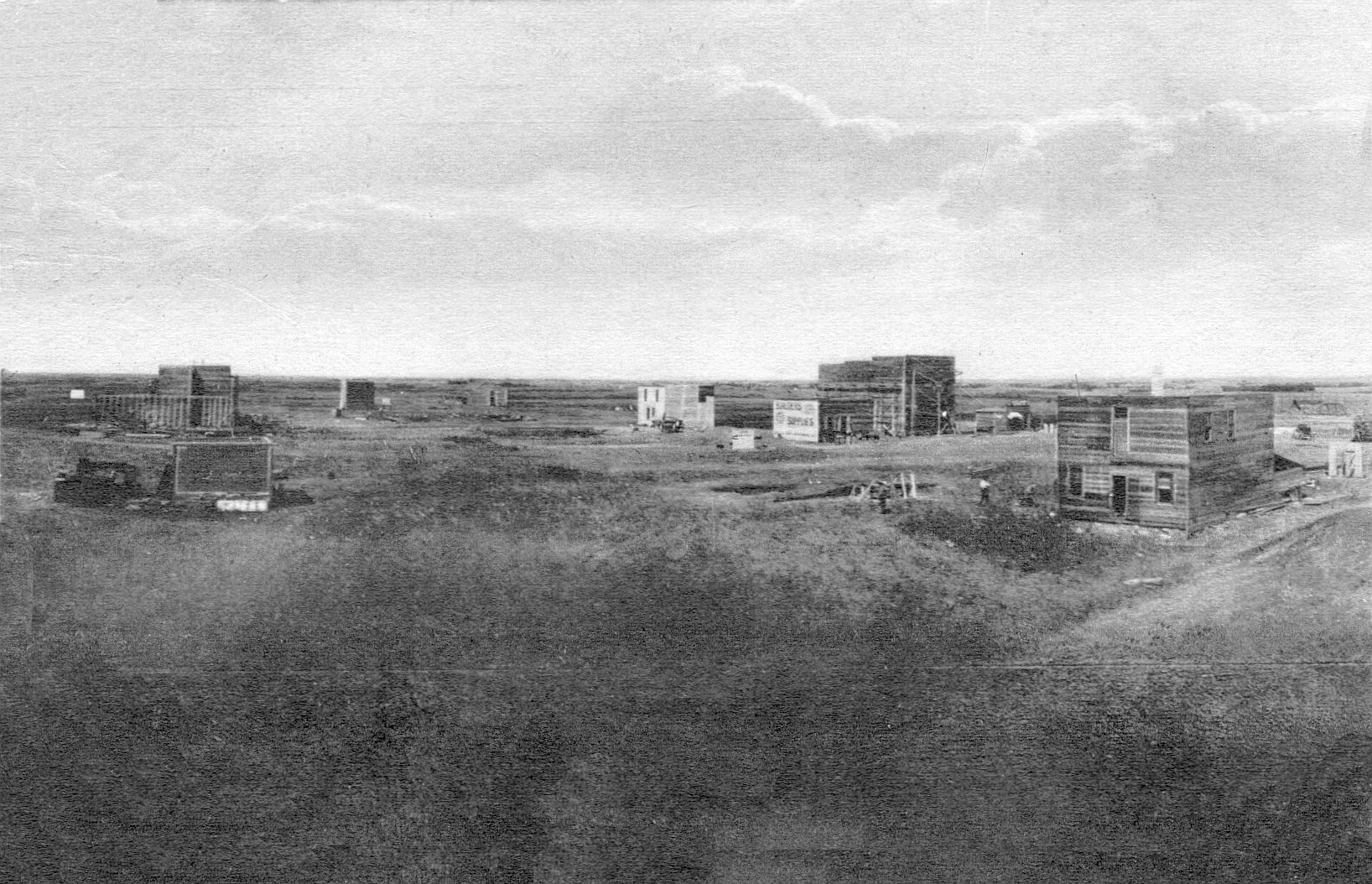
Castor, 1909

The area was settled after the turn of the century, and Castor was incorporated on July 13, 1910.

== Demographics ==
In the 2021 Census of Population conducted by Statistics Canada, the Town of Castor had a population of 803 living in 383 of its 426 total private dwellings, a change of −13.6% from its 2016 population of 929. With a land area of 2.61 km^{2} (1.01 sq mi), it had a population density of 307.7/km^{2} (796.8/sq mi) in 2021.

In the 2016 Census of Population conducted by Statistics Canada, the Town of Castor recorded a population of 929 living in 419 of its 448 total private dwellings, a −0.3% change from its 2011 population of 932. With a land area of 2.63 km^{2} (1.02 sq mi), it had a population density of 353.2/km^{2} (914.9/sq mi) in 2016.

== Tourism ==
Castor's tourism peaks during the summer months. Each year Castor Creek, which wraps around the north-east end of the town, draws many tourists. The creek is lined by sandstone cliffs, and is a good place for Kayaking and paddle-boarding. Other creek activities include motor-boating and swimming. In addition to the creek, the town has many museums, including the towns original hospital dating back to 1911, the Machine Shed Museum, the Pharmacy Museum housed in the towns original drug store, the Beaver School Museum, the historic All Saints Anglican Church, the Grain Elevator Historical Site, and the Train Station Museum.

== Economy ==
The town's main industries are agriculture, mining, and oil and gas services.

== Infrastructure ==
Castor is home to the Our Lady of the Rosary Hospital.

== Education ==
The Castor has two schools, one Public named Gus Wetter School and one Catholic named Theresetta Catholic School.

== Media ==
The local newspaper, the Castor Advance ceased publication in 2024.

== Literature ==
W. O. Mitchell was a teacher in Castor when he wrote Who Has Seen the Wind.

== Notable people ==
- Darcy Tucker, former professional hockey player

== See also ==
- List of communities in Alberta
- List of towns in Alberta
