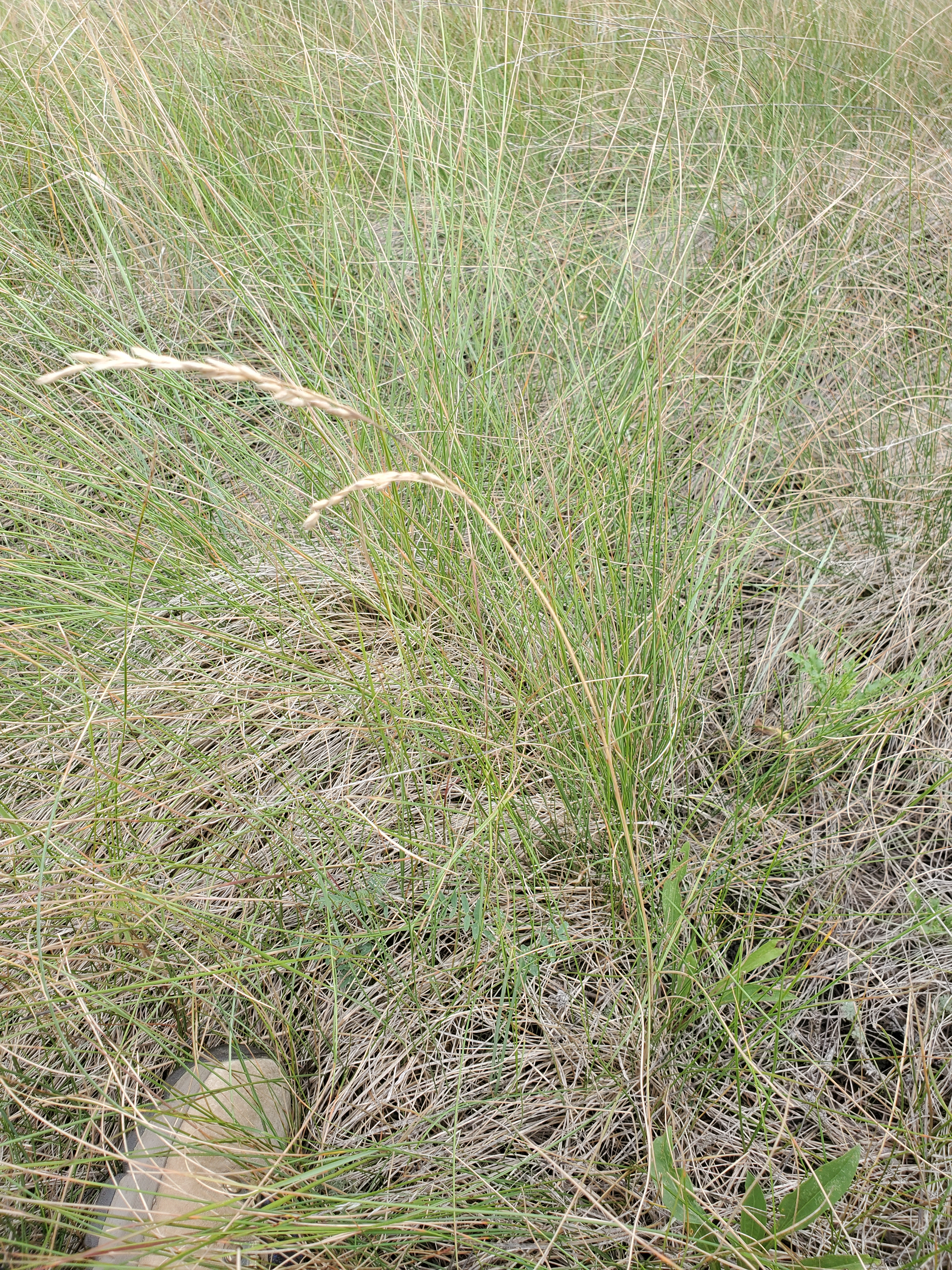

Scientific classification
- Kingdom: Plantae
- Clade: Tracheophytes
- Clade: Angiosperms
- Clade: Monocots
- Clade: Commelinids
- Order: Poales
- Family: Poaceae
- Subfamily: Pooideae
- Genus: Festuca
- Species: F. hallii

Binomial name
- Festuca hallii (Vasey)

= Festuca hallii =

Species of grass

Festuca hallii, the Piper plains rough fescue, is a species of grass which can be found in Central Canada and in such US states as New Mexico, North Dakota, Montana, Washington, and Wyoming.

== Description ==
Festuca hallii is a perennial bunchgrass with short rhizomes. It has stiff, rough leaf blades which grow to 10-35cm on average, and flowering culms which grow to 20-65cm on average.
