= Castor Creek (Alberta) =

River in Alberta, Canada

Coordinates: 52.3302778°N 111.6361111°W

Castor Creek is a watercourse in Alberta, Canada. It is a tributary of the Battle River. Castor Creek was named from the Latin word meaning "beaver".

The Castor Creek was dammed up in 1949. This changed the once narrow creek into something that resembles a long narrow winding lake.

In the town of Castor, there is access to the creek for kayaking, paddle boarding, and other water activities.

== See also ==
- List of rivers of Alberta
