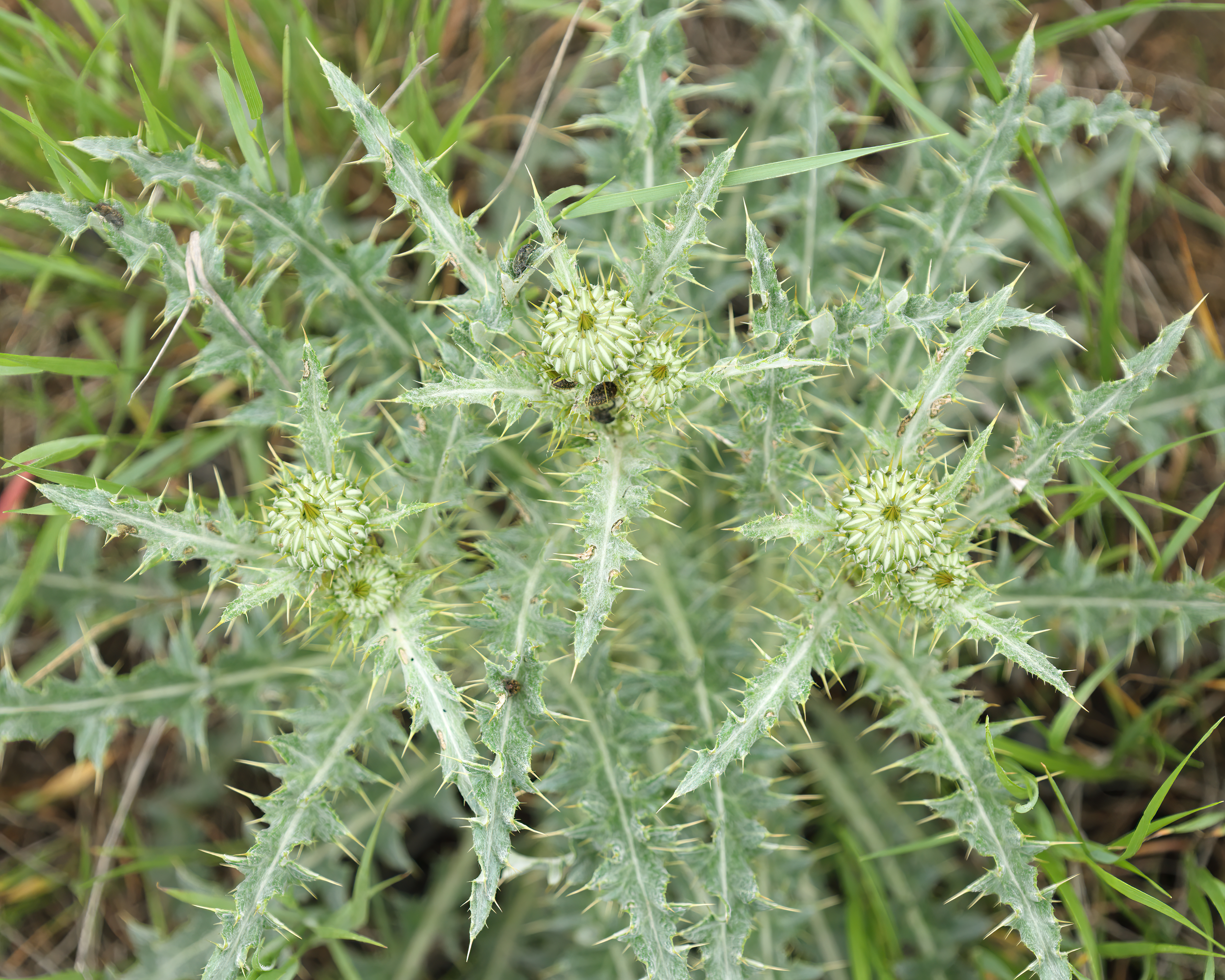
- Photograph
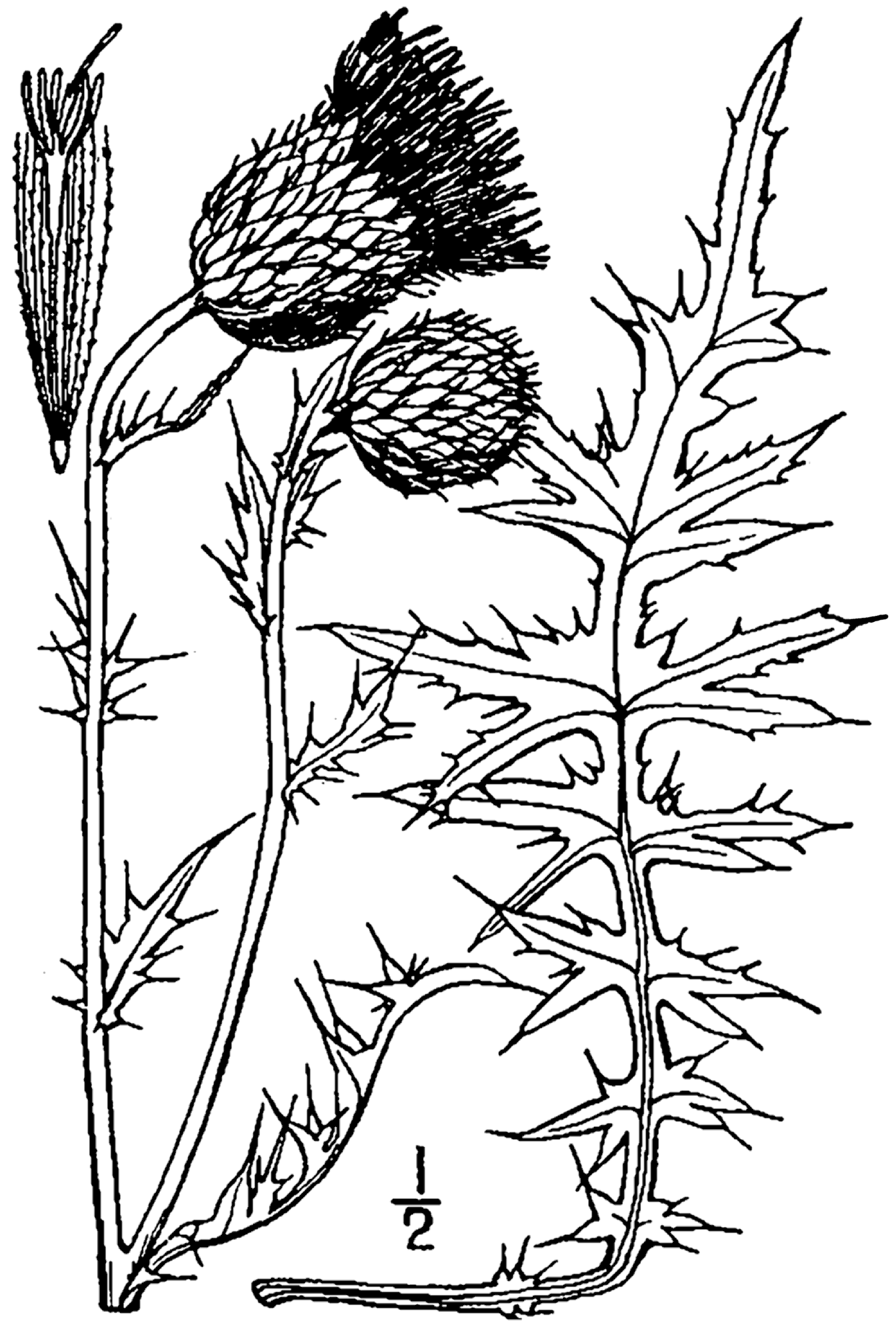
- 1913 illustration

Conservation status
- Secure (NatureServe)

Scientific classification
- Kingdom: Plantae
- Clade: Tracheophytes
- Clade: Angiosperms
- Clade: Eudicots
- Clade: Asterids
- Order: Asterales
- Family: Asteraceae
- Genus: Cirsium
- Species: C. flodmanii

Binomial name
- Cirsium flodmanii (Rydb.) Arthur

Synonyms
- Carduus flodmanii Rydb.; Carduus oblanceolatus Rydb.; Cirsium flodmanii f. oblanceolatum (Rydb.) D.Löve & J.-P.Bernard; Cirsium nebraskense var. discissum Lunell; Cirsium oblanceolatum (Rydb.) K.Schum.

= Cirsium flodmanii =

Flodman's thistle

Species of thistle

Cirsium flodmanii, commonly known as prairie thistle, Flodman's thistle, or (in French) chardon de Flodman, is a plant species native to Canada and the northern United States. It has been found in every Canadian province from Québec to Alberta, as well as from the northern Great Plains, northern Rocky Mountains, and western Great Lakes regions of the US, as well as northern parts of Vermont, New York, and Washington.

Cirsium flodmanii is a perennial herb up to 140 cm (55 inches) tall. Leaves are up to 40 cm (16 inches) long, with numerous fine spines along the edges. Flowers are usually purple, occasionally white. The plant generally is found in grasslands and pastures.

== Gallery ==
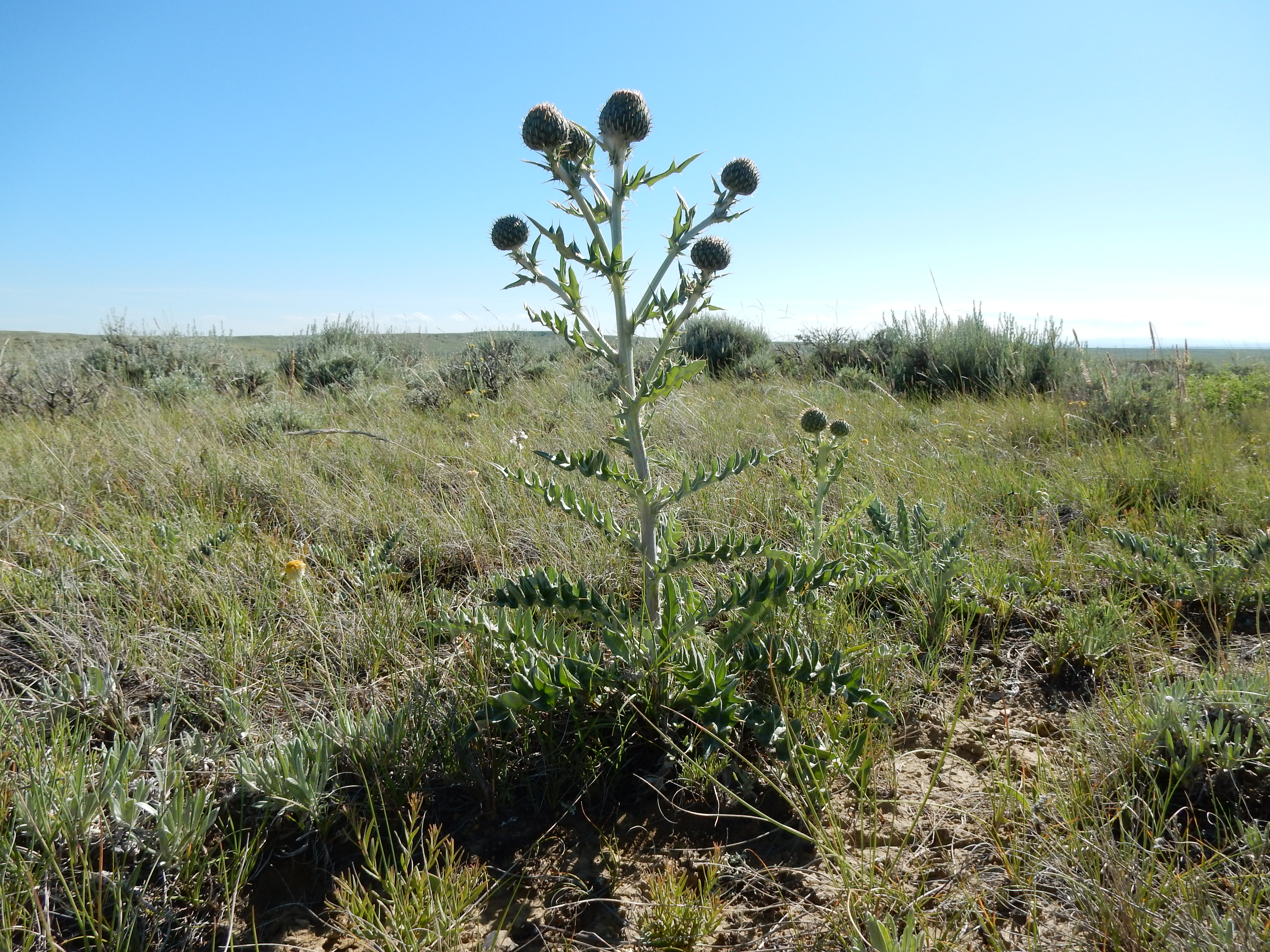
Habit

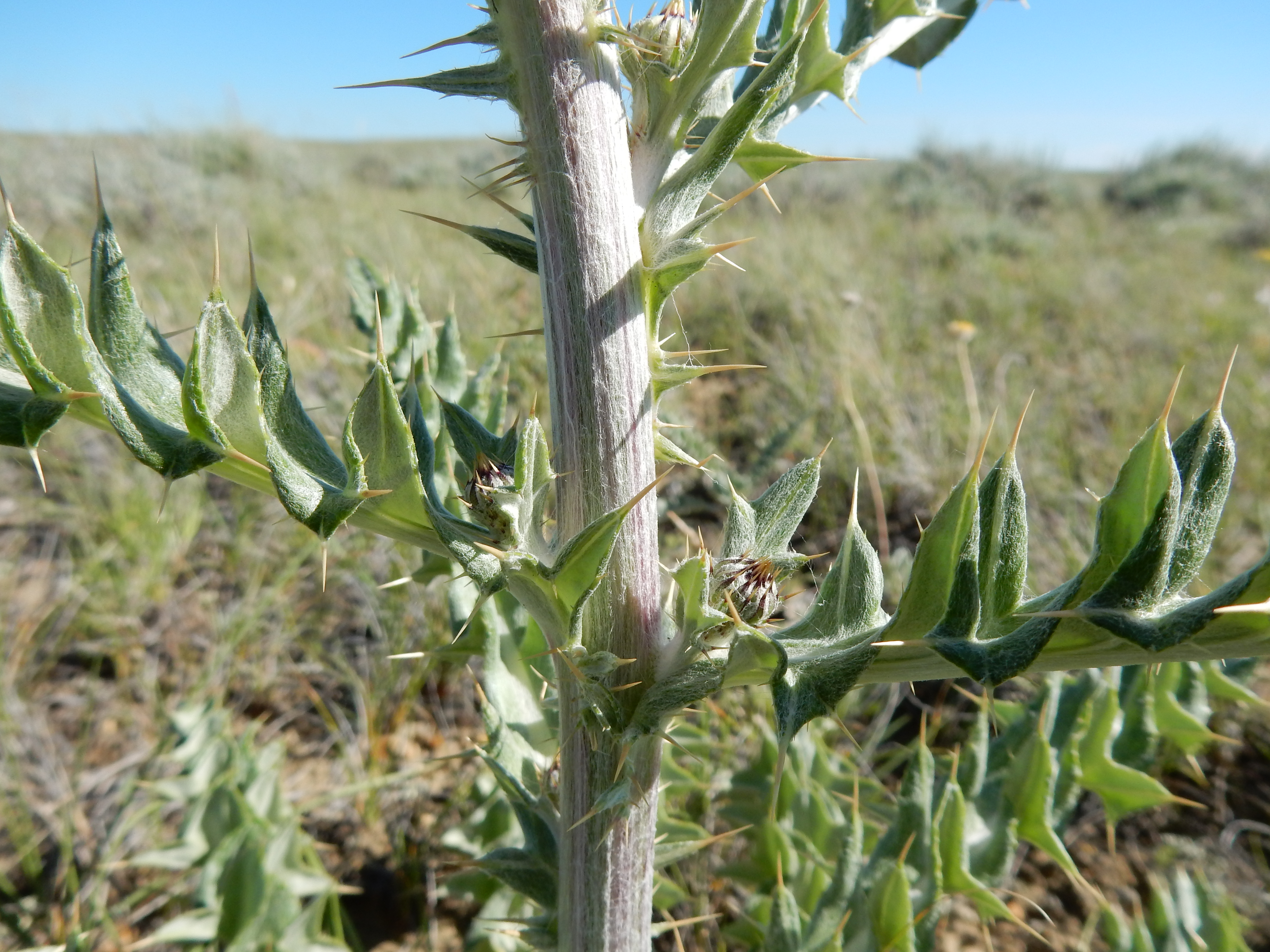
Stem

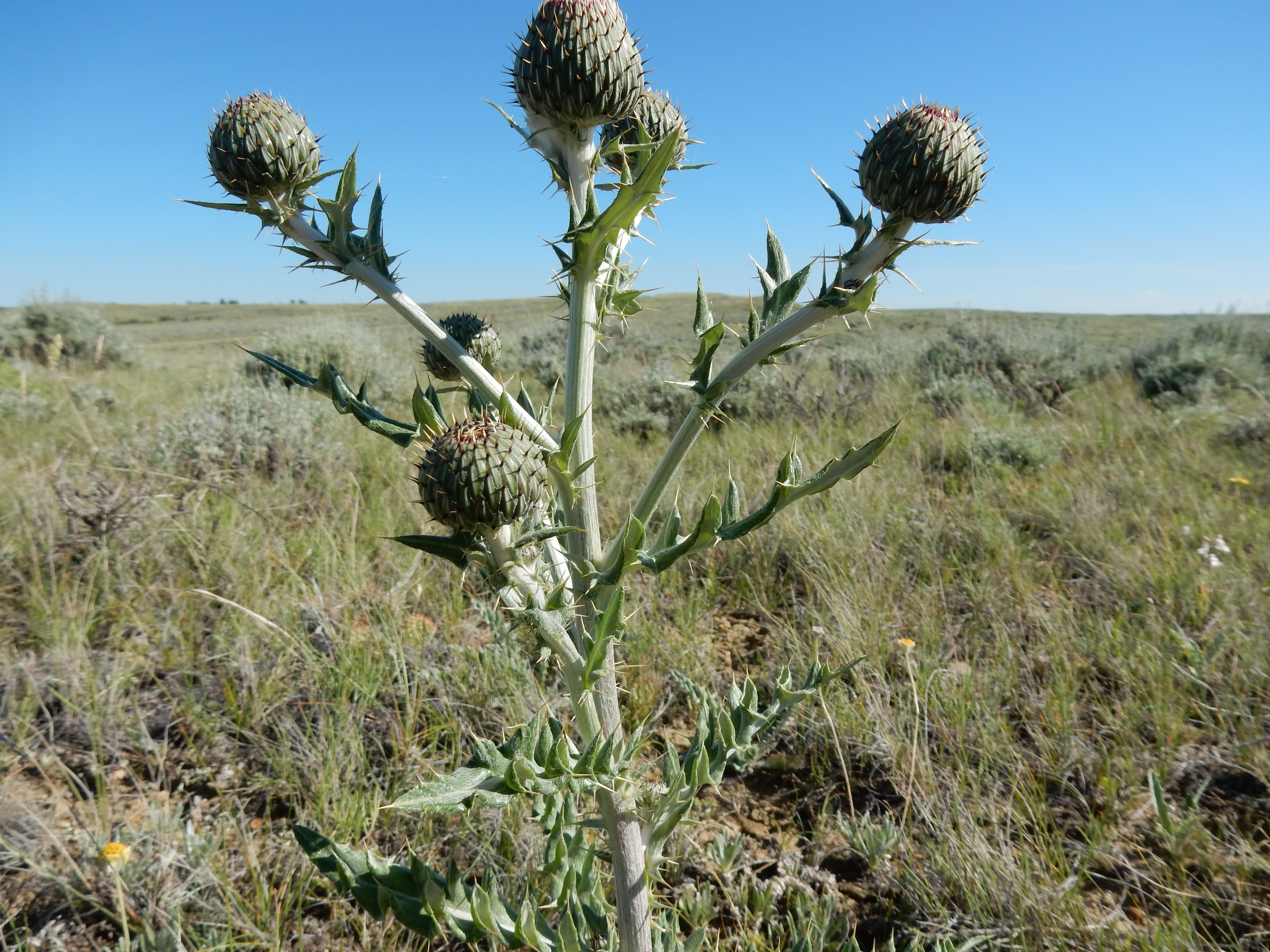
Inflorescence

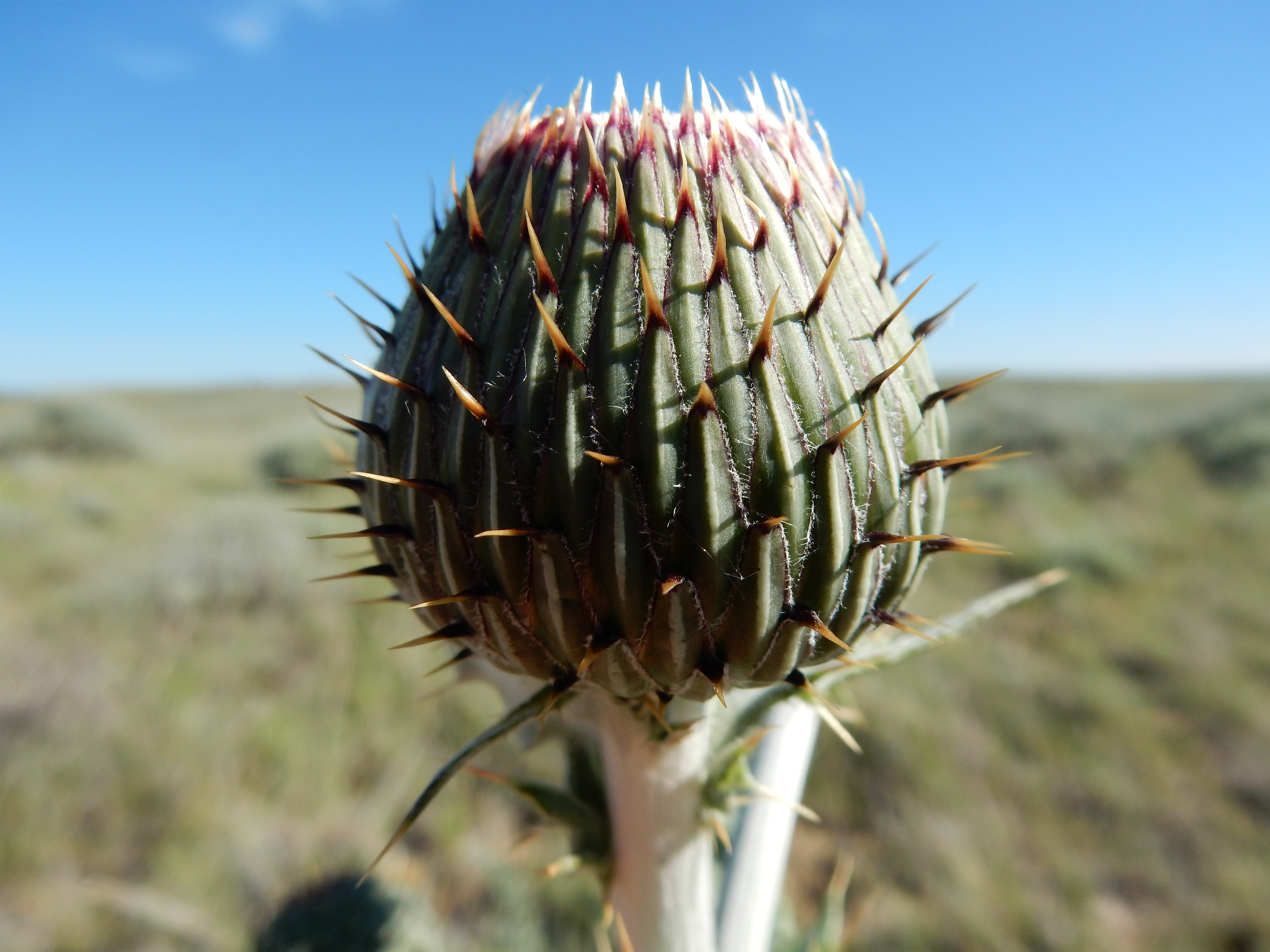
Involucre (unopened)

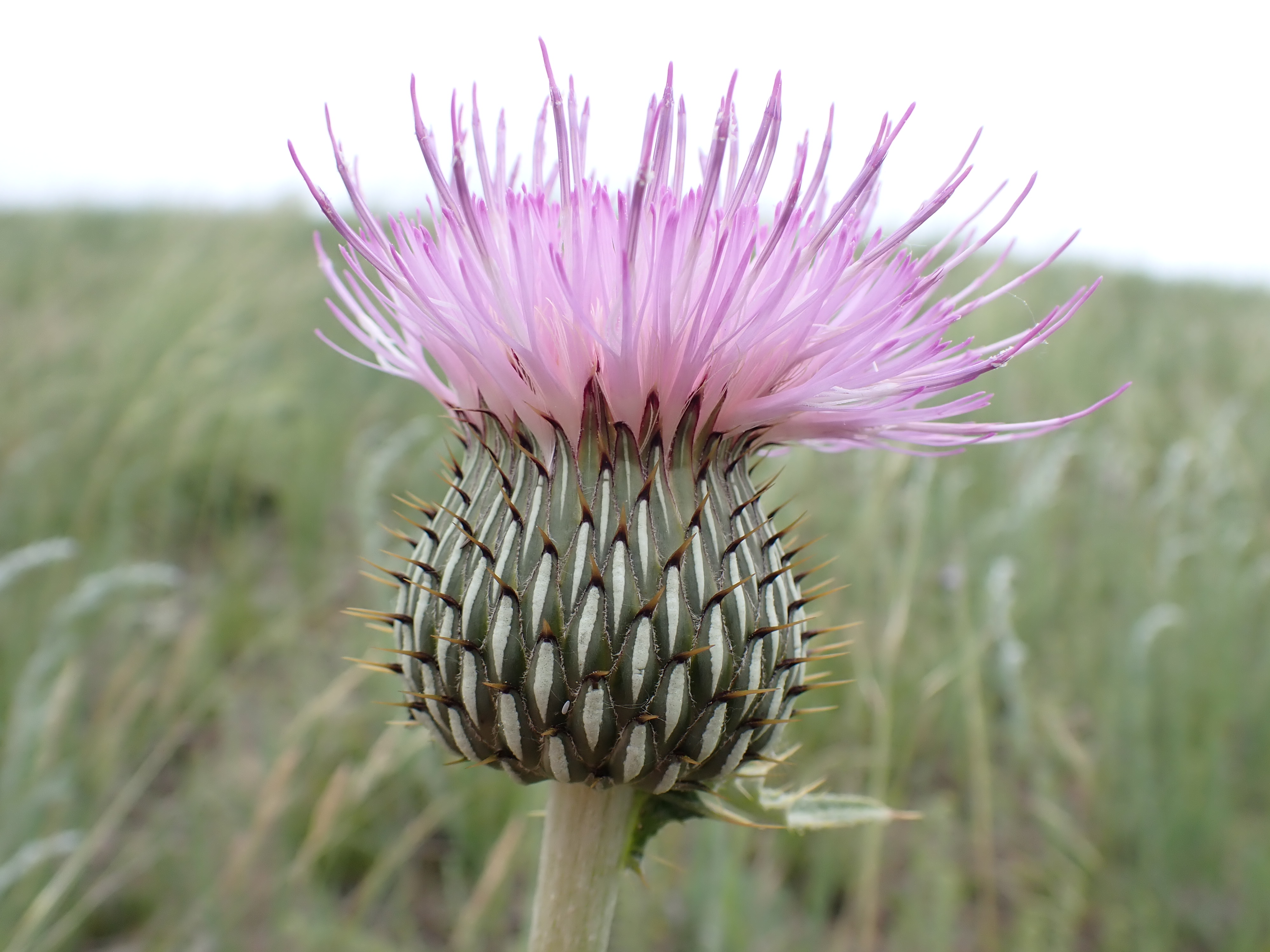
Involucre (blooming)
