= Galahad, Alberta =

Galahad
- Hamlet
- Hamlet of Galahad
- Galahad (1927)

- Location within Flagstaff County Location within Alberta
- Coordinates: 52°30′41″N 111°55′28″W
- Country: Canada
- Province: Alberta
- Region: Central Alberta
- Planning region: North Saskatchewan
- Municipal district: Flagstaff
- Incorporated (village): May 5, 1918
- Dissolved: January 1, 2016

Government
  - Governing body: Flagstaff County Council

Area (2021)
  - Land: 0.45 km^{2} (0.17 sq mi)
- Elevation: 708 m (2,323 ft)

Population (2021)
  - Total: 125
  - Density: 274.8/km^{2} (712/sq mi)
- Time zone: UTC−06:00 (Alberta Time)
- Highways: Highway 861
- Website: Official website

Galahad is a hamlet in east-central Alberta, Canada within Flagstaff County. It is located just a few miles north of the Battle River valley on a former Canadian National rail line. The hamlet was originally incorporated as a village on May 5, 1918. It dissolved to become a hamlet under the jurisdiction of Flagstaff County on January 1, 2016.

== Demographics ==
In the 2021 Census of Population conducted by Statistics Canada, Galahad had a population of 125 living in 51 of its 54 total private dwellings, a change of 12.6% from its 2016 population of 111. With a land area of 0.45 km^{2} (0.17 sq mi), it had a population density of 277.8/km^{2} (719.4/sq mi) in 2021.

As a designated place in the 2016 Census of Population conducted by Statistics Canada, Galahad had a population of 111 living in 44 of its 46 total private dwellings, a −6.7% change from its 2011 population of 119. With a land area of 0.60 km^{2} (0.23 sq mi), it had a population density of 185.0/km^{2} (479.1/sq mi) in 2016.

== Economy ==
The economic base of the Galahad area is agriculture (wheat, barley, canola as well as ranching), oil and gas production, coal mining and power generation.

== Arts and culture ==
The community was named after Galahad, of Arthurian legend. Of interest, the roads in Galahad have been given names pertaining to Arthurian legend. The hamlet has roads named Merlin Street, Sir Lancelot Street (which perhaps not surprisingly intersects with Guinevere Avenue), King Arthur Street and Lady Vivian Street. Another additional road name includes "Lady Helen" street, who is a figure clearly not connected to Arthurian legends.

== Transportation ==
Nearby transportation routes include Highway 36 and Highway 53.

== See also ==
- List of communities in Alberta
- List of former urban municipalities in Alberta
- List of hamlets in Alberta
