= Fabyan, Alberta =

Fabyan
- Hamlet
- Location of Fabyan Fabyan (Canada)
- Coordinates: 52°52′55″N 110°59′37″W
- Country: Canada
- Province: Alberta
- Region: Central Alberta
- Census division: 7
- Municipal district: Municipal District of Wainwright No. 61

Government
  - Type: Unincorporated
  - Governing body: Municipal District of Wainwright No. 61 Council

Population (2007)
  - Total: 100
- Time zone: UTC– 06:00 (Alberta Time)
- Area codes: 780, 587, 825

Fabyan is a hamlet in central Alberta, Canada within the Municipal District of Wainwright No. 61. It is located on Highway 14, approximately 10 kilometres (6.2 mi) west of Wainwright, Alberta, and 78 kilometres (48 mi) southwest of Lloydminster.

== Toponymy ==
Fabyan was named after a town of the same name (now part of Carroll) in New Hampshire, United States. The original Fabyan may have derived its name from Robert Fabyan, an English chronicler active in the 15th century.

== History ==
=== Founding: 1907–1919 ===
In 1907, construction began on a Grand Trunk Pacific Railway stop in the area. This was named Fabyan upon completion in 1910. The settlement was connected to Wainwright by the Fabyan Trestle Bridge. A general store opened in Fabyan in 1916, and a post office for the locality opened in May 1917.

=== Development: 1920–1949 ===
A Searle Grain Company grain elevator opened in Fabyan in 1927, followed by an Alberta Wheat Pool elevator in 1930.

Discoveries of oil and natural gas accelerated Fabyan's economy from the beginning of the 1920s. By the end of the decade, the Fabyan Petroleums Company was established, and an Imperial Oil well began operations. Fabyan School, opened in 1924, began to receive natural gas in 1926 from gas wells identified locally.

Locals established a rural co-operative company in the 1930s to provide telephone services to Fabyan. A Roman Catholic church opened in 1931, and a Fabyan Community Club was founded in 1935.

In December 1930, Fabyan resident Elizabeth Simpson was wounded with a knife in an act of jealousy by her husband, 19-year-old Bernard Craig, who suspected her of infidelity. Craig then unsuccessfully attempted suicide. Craig, represented by William R. Howson, pleaded guilty to attempted murder and attempted suicide in May 1931. After hearing that Craig had an intellectual disability, Justice Thomas Tweedie sentenced Craig to ten minutes in custody, the shortest sentence on Albertan record, to run concurrently for both charges.

=== Hamlet: 1950–present ===
In 1951, Fabyan's name was accepted for mapping purposes by the Geographical Names Board of Canada. Fabyan received piped potable water and Calgary Power connections in the early 1950s. In March 1953, Fabyan School closed, and its building was put up for sale. By 2007, Fabyan's church was no longer in use; an antiques shop operated out of its building for a time.

Fabyan was the site of three significant train accidents in the 2010s. A train carrying grain derailed in January 2012 on the Fabyan Trestle Bridge, with 31 cars leaving the tracks and 17 falling from the bridge entirely. A year later, a train collided with a pickup truck on tracks near Fabyan, resulting in the death of the vehicle's driver. Strong winds derailed 13 train cars from the Fabyan Trestle Bridge in October 2017; this incident resulted in no casualties.

As of 2024, Fabyan contains no services, and its sole amenity is the Fabyan Campsite. Freight services using the Fabyan Trestle remain operational.

== Climate ==
Climate data for Fabyan, Alberta
Month	Jan	Feb	Mar	Apr	May	Jun	Jul	Aug	Sep	Oct	Nov	Dec	Year
Record high °C (°F)	8.5 (47.3)	12.0 (53.6)	17.0 (62.6)	29.0 (84.2)	34.5 (94.1)	37.0 (98.6)	38.5 (101.3)	37.5 (99.5)	34.0 (93.2)	28.0 (82.4)	16.0 (60.8)	11.5 (52.7)	38.5 (101.3)
Mean daily maximum °C (°F)	−8.6 (16.5)	−5.6 (21.9)	0.2 (32.4)	10.5 (50.9)	17.1 (62.8)	21.0 (69.8)	23.6 (74.5)	23.0 (73.4)	17.3 (63.1)	9.8 (49.6)	−1.6 (29.1)	−7.0 (19.4)	8.3 (46.9)
Daily mean °C (°F)	−14.1 (6.6)	−11.5 (11.3)	−5.4 (22.3)	4.0 (39.2)	10.2 (50.4)	14.6 (58.3)	17.0 (62.6)	15.9 (60.6)	10.4 (50.7)	3.4 (38.1)	−6.5 (20.3)	−12.1 (10.2)	2.2 (36.0)
Mean daily minimum °C (°F)	−19.7 (−3.5)	−17.3 (0.9)	−11.0 (12.2)	−2.5 (27.5)	3.2 (37.8)	8.1 (46.6)	10.4 (50.7)	8.9 (48.0)	3.6 (38.5)	−3.1 (26.4)	−11.3 (11.7)	−17.3 (0.9)	−4.0 (24.8)
Record low °C (°F)	−44.0 (−47.2)	−47.5 (−53.5)	−37.0 (−34.6)	−28.0 (−18.4)	−10.5 (13.1)	−1.5 (29.3)	1.0 (33.8)	−3.0 (26.6)	−10.0 (14.0)	−26.0 (−14.8)	−34.5 (−30.1)	−42.0 (−43.6)	−47.5 (−53.5)
Average precipitation mm (inches)	19.7 (0.78)	10.5 (0.41)	17.5 (0.69)	27.0 (1.06)	44.4 (1.75)	68.2 (2.69)	72.5 (2.85)	61.1 (2.41)	37.9 (1.49)	17.1 (0.67)	17.7 (0.70)	18.0 (0.71)	411.8 (16.21)
Average rainfall mm (inches)	0.9 (0.04)	0.1 (0.00)	1.6 (0.06)	16.9 (0.67)	41.7 (1.64)	68.2 (2.69)	72.5 (2.85)	61.0 (2.40)	37.2 (1.46)	9.8 (0.39)	1.4 (0.06)	0.5 (0.02)	311.9 (12.28)
Average snowfall cm (inches)	18.8 (7.4)	10.4 (4.1)	15.9 (6.3)	10.1 (4.0)	2.7 (1.1)	0.0 (0.0)	0.0 (0.0)	0.1 (0.0)	0.7 (0.3)	7.4 (2.9)	16.4 (6.5)	17.6 (6.9)	99.9 (39.3)
Source: Environment Canada

== Demographics ==
The population of Fabyan according to the 2007 municipal census conducted by the Municipal District of Wainwright No. 61 is 100.

== See also ==
- List of communities in Alberta
- List of hamlets in Alberta
