= Donalda =

- Village
- Village of Donalda
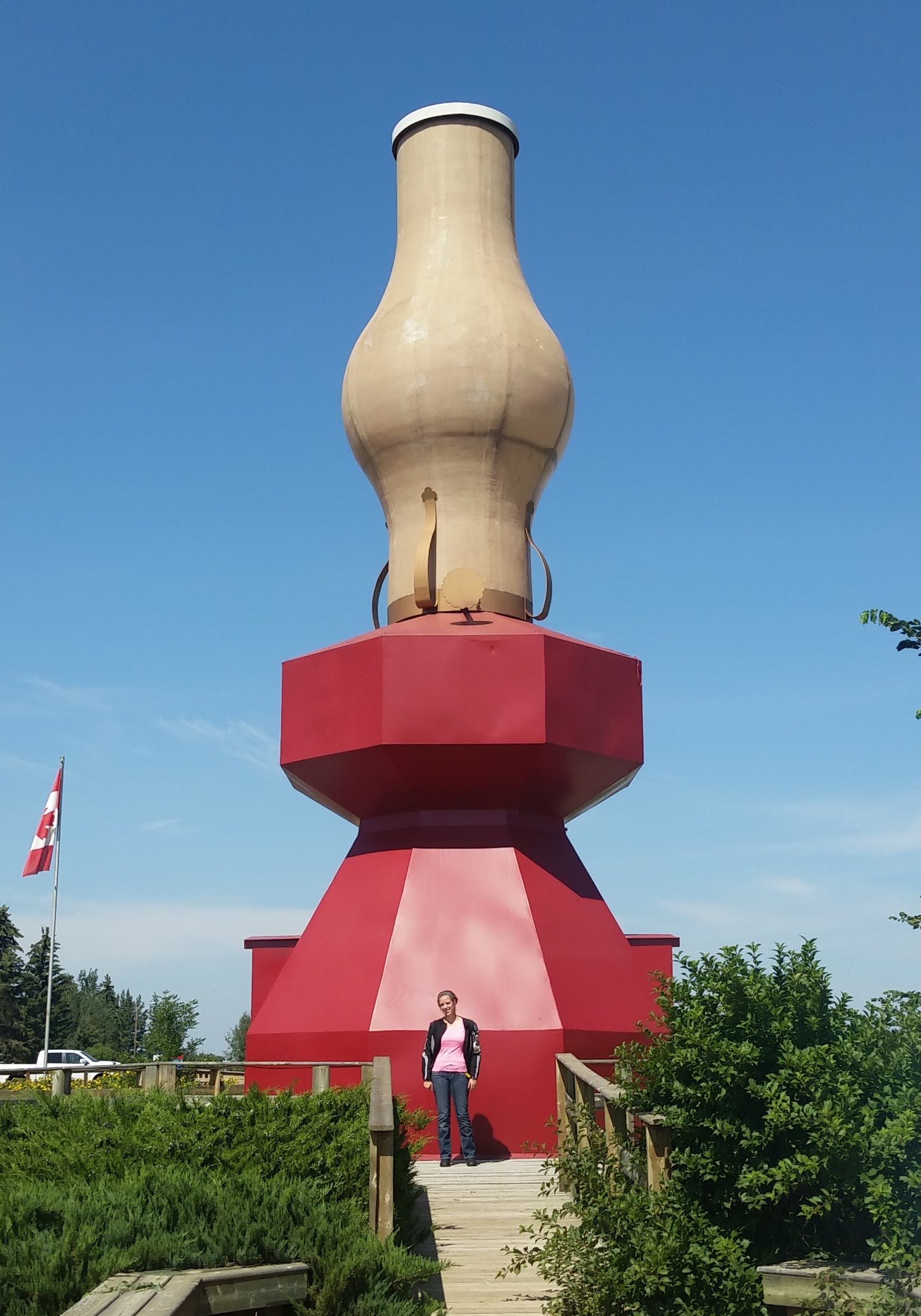
- The Donalda oil lamp roadside attraction

- Location in Alberta
- Coordinates: 52°34′58.2″N 112°34′18.2″W
- Country: Canada
- Province: Alberta
- Region: Central Alberta
- Census division: 7
- Municipal district: County of Stettler No. 6
- Incorporated
  - Village: December 30, 1912

Government
  - Mayor: Shaleah Fox
  - Governing body: Donalda Village Council

Area (2021)
  - Land: 0.97 km^{2} (0.37 sq mi)
- Elevation: 780 m (2,560 ft)

Population (2021)
  - Total: 226
  - Density: 233.6/km^{2} (605/sq mi)
- Time zone: UTC−06:00 (Alberta Time)
- Highways: Highway 53
- Website: village.donalda.ab.ca

Donalda is a village in central Alberta, Canada that is east of Ponoka. It was founded in 1911 and takes its name from Donalda Crossway, a niece of Sir Donald Mann, a Canadian Northern Railway official. It is home to the "World's Largest Oil Lamp", standing at 12.8 metres (42 ft) high, the structure is one of the Giants of the Prairies. The village was first named Eidswold by the Norwegian settlers who first founded the community. It was renamed Donalda in 1910, when the railroad came through.

== Demographics ==
In the 2021 census conducted by Statistics Canada, the village of Donalda had a population of 226 living in 109 of its 123 total private dwellings, a change of 3.2% from its 2016 population of 219. With a land area of 0.97 km^{2} (0.37 sq mi), it had a population density of 233.0/km^{2} (603.4/sq mi) in 2021.

In the 2016 census conducted by Statistics Canada, the village of Donalda recorded a population of 219 living in 115 of its 131 total private dwellings, a −15.4% change from its 2011 population of 259. With a land area of 0.99 km^{2} (0.38 sq mi), it had a population density of 221.2/km^{2} (572.9/sq mi) in 2016.

== Education ==
Donalda School has about 80 students from pre-kindergarten to grade 9.

== Notable people ==
- Cody Cassidy, steer wrestler
- Robert E. Collin, electrical engineering professor
- Tricia Helfer, actor and model, best known for playing Number Six in the re-imagined Battlestar Galactica miniseries and television series

== See also ==
- List of communities in Alberta
- List of villages in Alberta
