= Sedgewick, Alberta =

Sedgewick
- Town
- Town of Sedgewick
- Aerial shot of Sedgewick

- Location within Flagstaff County Location within Alberta
- Coordinates: 52°46′21″N 111°41′49″W
- Country: Canada
- Province: Alberta
- Region: Central Alberta
- Census division: 7
- Municipal district: Flagstaff County
- Incorporated
  - Village: March 6, 1907
  - Town: May 1, 1966

Government
  - Mayor: Stephen Levy
  - Governing body: Sedgewick Town Council

Area (2021)
  - Land: 2.71 km^{2} (1.05 sq mi)
- Elevation: 663 m (2,175 ft)

Population (2021)
  - Total: 761
  - Density: 280.7/km^{2} (727/sq mi)
- Time zone: UTC−06:00 (Alberta Time)
- Highways: Highway 13; Highway 869
- Waterways: Iron Creek
- Website: sedgewick.ca

Sedgewick is a town in central Alberta, Canada. It is approximately 83 km (52 mi) east of Camrose at the junction of Highway 13 and Highway 869. The Canadian Pacific Kansas City railway runs through the town.

== Demographics ==
In the 2021 Census of Population conducted by Statistics Canada, the Town of Sedgewick had a population of 761 living in 357 of its 421 total private dwellings, a change of −6.2% from its 2016 population of 811. With a land area of 2.71 km^{2} (1.05 sq mi), it had a population density of 280.8/km^{2} (727.3/sq mi) in 2021.

In the 2016 Census of Population conducted by Statistics Canada, the Town of Sedgewick recorded a population of 811 living in 366 of its 401 total private dwellings, a −5.4% change from its 2011 population of 857. With a land area of 2.72 km^{2} (1.05 sq mi), it had a population density of 298.2/km^{2} (772.2/sq mi) in 2016.

== See also ==
- List of communities in Alberta
- List of towns in Alberta
