= Battle River =

River in Alberta and Saskatchewan, Canada

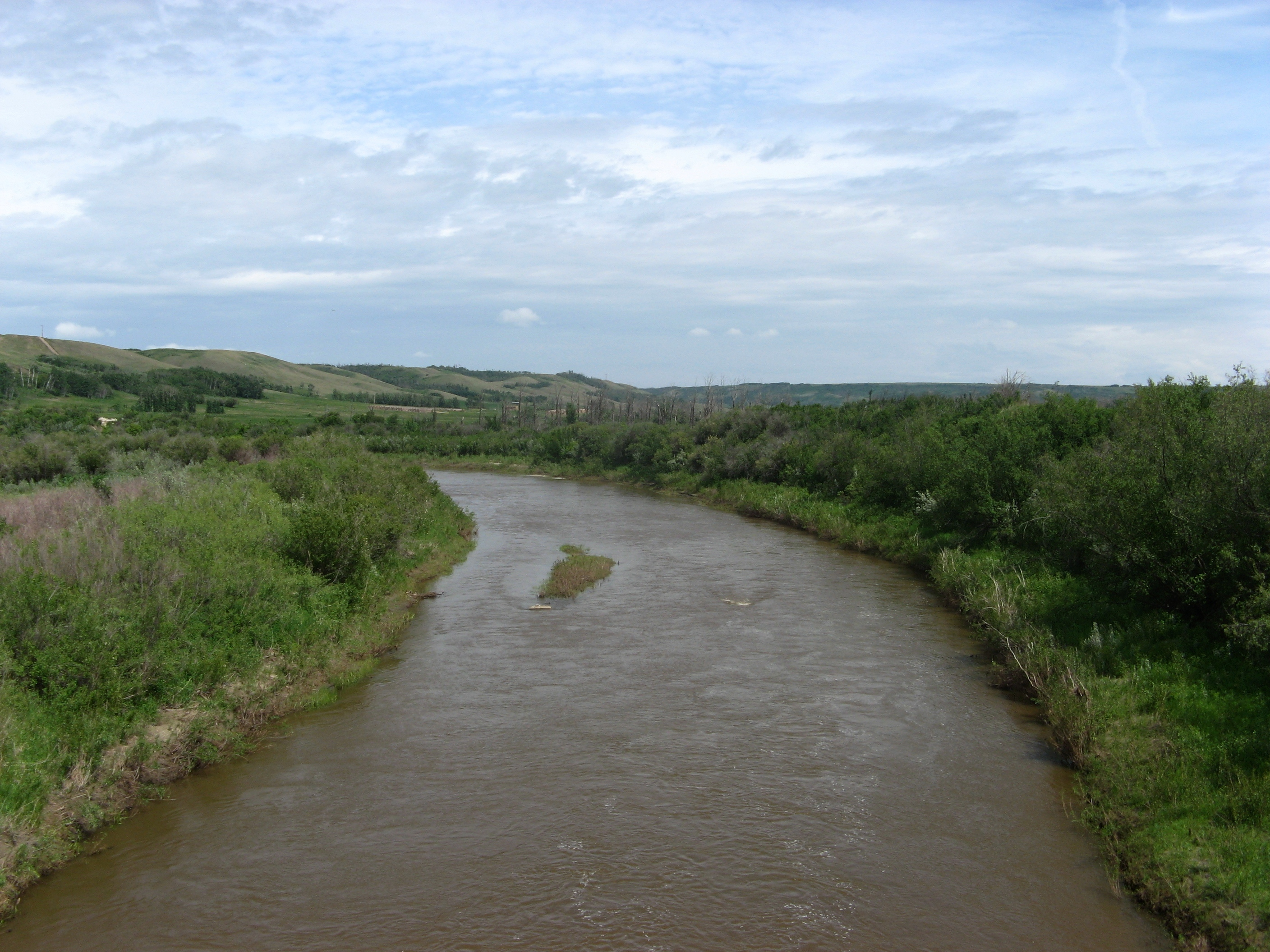

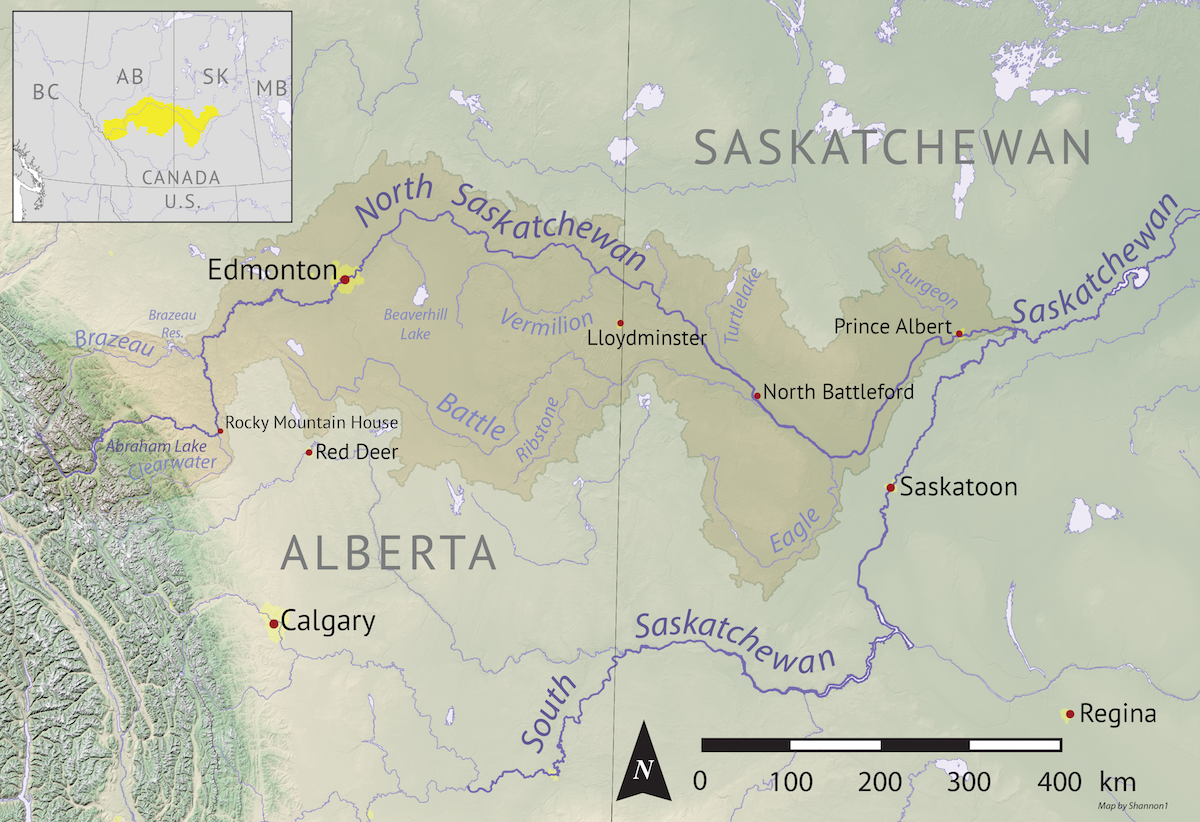
- North Saskatchewan River drainage basin

- Location of mouth in Saskatchewan Battle River (Canada)

Location
- Country: Canada
- Provinces: Alberta; Saskatchewan

Physical characteristics
- Source: Battle Lake
  - location: Alberta
  - coordinates: 52°56′57″N 114°08′41″W
  - elevation: 849 m (2,785 ft)
- Mouth: North Saskatchewan River
  - location: Battleford, Saskatchewan
  - coordinates: 52°42′42″N 108°15′13″W
  - elevation: 463 m (1,519 ft)
- Length: 570 km (350 mi)
- Basin size: 30,300 km^{2} (11,700 sq mi)
- Discharge
  - average: 10 m^{3}/s (350 cu ft/s)

Battle River is a river in central Alberta and western Saskatchewan, Canada. It is a major tributary of the North Saskatchewan River.

The Battle River flows for 570 kilometres (350 mi) and drains a total area of 30,300 square kilometres (11,700 sq mi). Its mean discharge at the mouth is 10 m³/s.

== History ==
The river is said to be named for a battle that took place between the Cree and the Blackfoot.

== Course ==
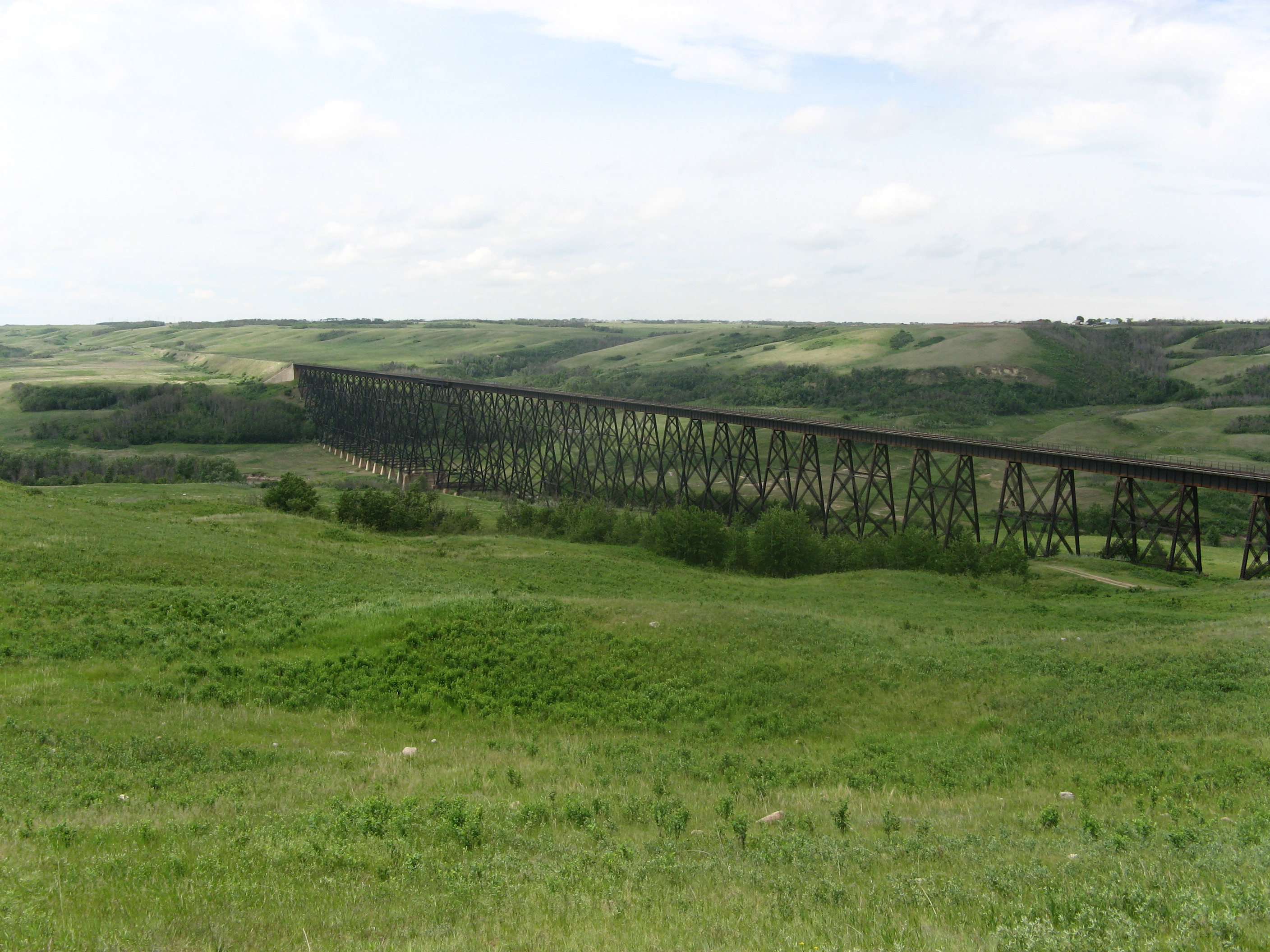
Fabyan Trestle Bridge over the Battle River Valley near Wainwright

The headwaters of Battle River is Battle Lake in west-central Alberta, east of Winfield. The river flows through Alberta and into Saskatchewan, where it discharges into the North Saskatchewan River at Battleford. Over its course, the river flows through Ponoka and by Hardisty and Fabyan within Alberta. Big Knife Provincial Park is situated on the south bank of the river west of Highway 855, about 15 kilometres (9.3 mi) southwest of Forestburg. The Fabyan Trestle Bridge also spans the river.

== Tributaries ==
- Sunny Creek
- Wolf Creek
- Pigeon Lake Creek
- Stoney Creek
- Pipestone Creek
- Driedmeat Creek
- Meeting Creek
- Paintearth Creek
- Castor Creek
- Iron Creek
- Ribstone Creek
- Cut Knife Creek

Battle Lake, Samson Lake, Driedmeat Lake, and Big Knife Lake are formed along the river, and numerous other lakes (such as Pigeon Lake, Coal Lake, Bittern Lake, Vernon Lake, Ernest Lake, and Soda Lake) lie in the Battle River hydrographic basin.

== See also ==
- List of rivers of Alberta
- List of rivers of Saskatchewan
