= Flagstaff County =

Municipal district in Alberta, Canada

- Municipal district
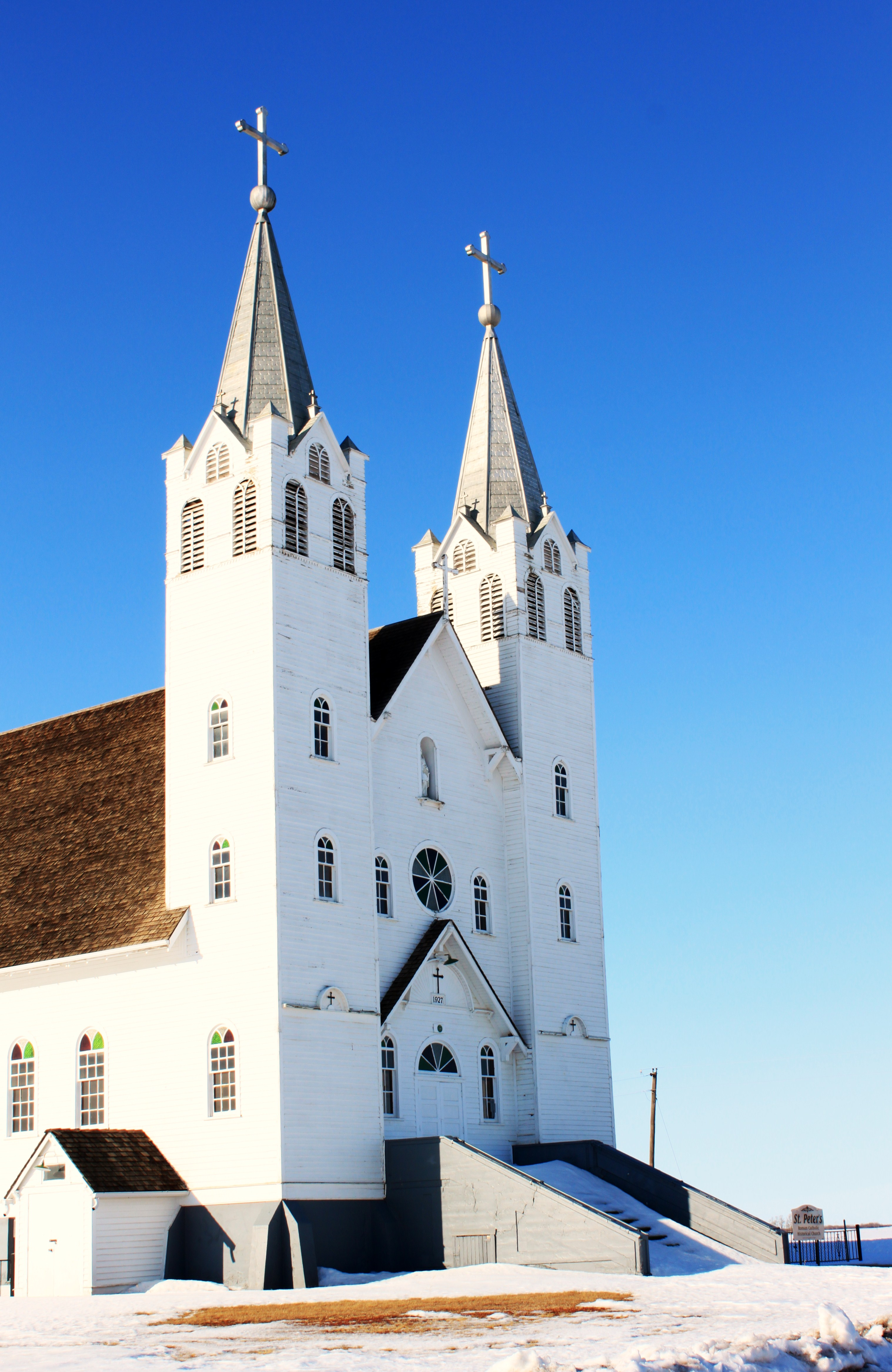
- St. Peter's Roman Catholic Church

- Logo

- Major communities

- Location within Alberta
- Coordinates: 52°46′21″N 111°41′49″W
- Country: Canada
- Province: Alberta
- Region: Central Alberta
- Planning region: North Saskatchewan
- Established: 1944
- Incorporated: 1968

Government
  - Reeve: Donald Kroetch
  - Governing body: Flagstaff County Council
  - Administrative office: Sedgewick

Area (2021)
  - Land: 3,959.78 km^{2} (1,528.88 sq mi)

Population (2021)
  - Total: 3,694
  - Density: 0.9/km^{2} (2.3/sq mi)
- Time zone: UTC−06:00 (Alberta Time)
- Website: flagstaff.ab.ca

Flagstaff County is a municipal district in east central Alberta, Canada.

It is located in Census Division 7. The county was incorporated in the current boundaries in 1944 as Municipal District of Killam No. 390, name changed a year later to Municipal District of Flagstaff No. 62. It was established as a county in 1968. Its municipal office is located in the Town of Sedgewick.

== Geography ==
=== Communities and localities ===
The following urban municipalities are surrounded by Flagstaff County.

Cities

- none

Towns

- Daysland
- Hardisty
- Killam
- Sedgewick

Villages

- Alliance
- Forestburg
- Heisler
- Lougheed

Summer villages

- none

The following hamlets are located within Flagstaff County.

Hamlets

- Galahad
- Strome

The following localities are located within Flagstaff County.

Localities

- Battle Bend
- Bellshill
- Berkinshaw
- Bonlea
- Lorraine
- Woodglen

== Demographics ==
In the 2021 Census of Population conducted by Statistics Canada, Flagstaff County had a population of 3,694 living in 1,378 of its 1,558 total private dwellings, a change of −0.9% from its 2016 population of 3,728. With a land area of 3,959.78 km^{2} (1,528.88 sq mi), it had a population density of 0.9/km^{2} (2.4/sq mi) in 2021.

In the 2016 Census of Population conducted by Statistics Canada, Flagstaff County had a population of 3,738 living in 1,380 of its 1,532 total private dwellings, a 4.1% change from its 2011 population of 3,591. With a land area of 4,067.58 km^{2} (1,570.50 sq mi), it had a population density of 0.9/km^{2} (2.4/sq mi) in 2016.

== Infrastructure ==
Transportation

The area is served by Killam-Sedgewick/Flagstaff Regional Airport.

== See also ==
- List of communities in Alberta
- List of municipal districts in Alberta
