= List of Grand Trunk Pacific Railway stations =

This is a partial list of Grand Trunk Pacific Railway stations.

The Grand Trunk Pacific Railway used an alphabetical station naming system for railway stations along its mainline from Winnipeg, Manitoba, to Prince Rupert, British Columbia. The name of the GTP railway station usually became the name of the town that developed in close proximity to it. A similar system was used in a part of Ontario.

Beginning at Portage la Prairie, Manitoba, and travelling north-west through Manitoba, Saskatchewan and Alberta to British Columbia, the towns along the railway are listed below, in the order they appear on maps.

== Ontario ==
Alba, Baird, Crest, Dona (incomplete)

== Manitoba ==
Alpha, Bloom, Caye, Deer, Exira, Firdale, Gregg, Harte, Ingelow, Justice, Knox, Levine, Myra, Norman, Oakner, Pope, Quadra, Rea, Uno, Treat, Victor

== Saskatchewan ==
Welby, Yarbo, Zeneta, Atwater, Bangor, Cana, Elroy, Fenwood, Goodeve, Hubbard, Ituna, Jasmin, Kelliher, Leross, Lestock, Mosten, Punnichy, Quinton, Raymore, Semans, Tate, Undora, Venn, Watrous, Xena, Young, Zelma, Allan, Bradwell, Clavet, Duro, Earl, Farley, Grandora, Hawoods, Ivana, Juniata, Kinley, Leney, Mead, Neola, Oban, Palo, Reford, Scott, Tako, Unity, Vera, Winter, Yonker, Zumbro, Artland, Biggar.

== Alberta ==
Butze, Chauvin, Dunn, Edgerton, Greenshields, Wainwright, Fabyan, Hawkins, Irma, Jarrow, Kinsella, Meighen, Nestor, Poe, Ryley, Shonts, Tofield, Uncas, Ardrossan, Bremner, Clover Bar, Edmonton, Fallis, Gainford, Hargwen, Imrie, Junkins, Keston, Leaman, Mackay, Niton, Otley, Peers, Rosevear, Thornton, Wolf Creek, Yates, Ansell, Bickerdike, Dalehurst, Entrance, Fitzhugh.
