= Whiteshore Lake =

Lake in Saskatchewan, Canada

- Location in Saskatchewan Whiteshore Lake (Canada)
- Location: West-central Saskatchewan
- Coordinates: 52.1388°N 108.3544°W
- Type: Salt lake
- Part of: North Saskatchewan River drainage basin
- Primary outflows: None
- Basin countries: Canada
- Max. length: 17 km (11 mi)
- Surface area: 2,015 ha (4,980 acres)
- Shore length^{1}: 48 km (30 mi)
- Surface elevation: 622 m (2,041 ft)
- Settlements: Palo
- ^{1} Shore length is not a well-defined measure.

Whiteshore Lake is a salt lake in the west-central part of the Canadian province of Saskatchewan. It is a post-glacial, evaporative playa lake within the North Saskatchewan River drainage basin. The lake forms the northern boundary of the Rural Municipality of Biggar No. 347 and the southern boundary of the Rural Municipality of Rosemount No. 378. It is about 15 kilometres (9.3 mi) north-west of the town of Biggar.

Along the northern shore of Whiteshore Lake is the Palo salt mine, the community of Palo, and Reginald G. Whitford Memorial Park. Sodium sulphate has been mined at the lake since 1934. Access to the lake and its amenities is from Highway 14.

== Description ==
Whiteshore Lake is a salt lake with no outflow that has an area of 2,015 hectares (4,980 acres) and a shoreline measuring 48 kilometres (30 mi). To the east is Oban and Castlewood Lakes and to the north-west is Landis Lake. There are no fish in Whiteshore Lake. The climate is warm-summer humid continental.

Along the northern shore is the Palo Mine. It is a sodium sulphate mine owned by the Saskatoon-based Upcycle Minerals Inc. After being shuttered since the 2000s, Upcycle Minerals acquired the 3,360-acre site and announced on 16 March 2026 that 50 exploratory holes were drilled with core samples taken.

== See also ==
- List of lakes of Saskatchewan
