= Jarrow, Alberta =

Unincorporated community in Alberta, Canada

Jarrow
- Location within Alberta Location within Canada
- Coordinates: 52.940°N 111.394°W
- Country: Canada
- Province: Alberta
- County: Municipal District of Wainwright No. 61
- First settled: 1900s

Government
  - Postmaster: Edwin Jackson
- Time zone: Alberta Time
- Area code: 780

Jarrow is an unincorporated community in the Municipal District of Wainwright No. 61, Alberta, Canada. The first settler arrived in the late 1900s along a Grand Trunk Pacific Railway. Jarrow is situated along Highway 14, near Kinsella and Irma.

== History ==
Jarrow was first settled by the first postmaster, Edwin Jackson, around the late 1900s. Jarrow got its name from Jarrow, a town in Tyne and Wear, England.

When a post office was established, Jarrow experienced two major name changes, the first being "Jackson's Coulee" prior to 1909, named after Jackson. From April 1910 to October 1929, the settlement was renamed to "Junkins", but the final name decided on was Jarrow.

Jarrow had been situated along a Grand Trunk Pacific Railway, which had a series of stations in alphabetical order, including Kinsella, Hawkins, and Irma.

== Present day ==
Today, nothing remains of the past settlement. The community is now populated with new houses, with a nearby cemetery.

Jarrow has upcoming, renewable energy developments near Wainwright, one being the 252S DER Solar Battery project.
