= Castlewood Lake =

Lake in Saskatchewan, Canada

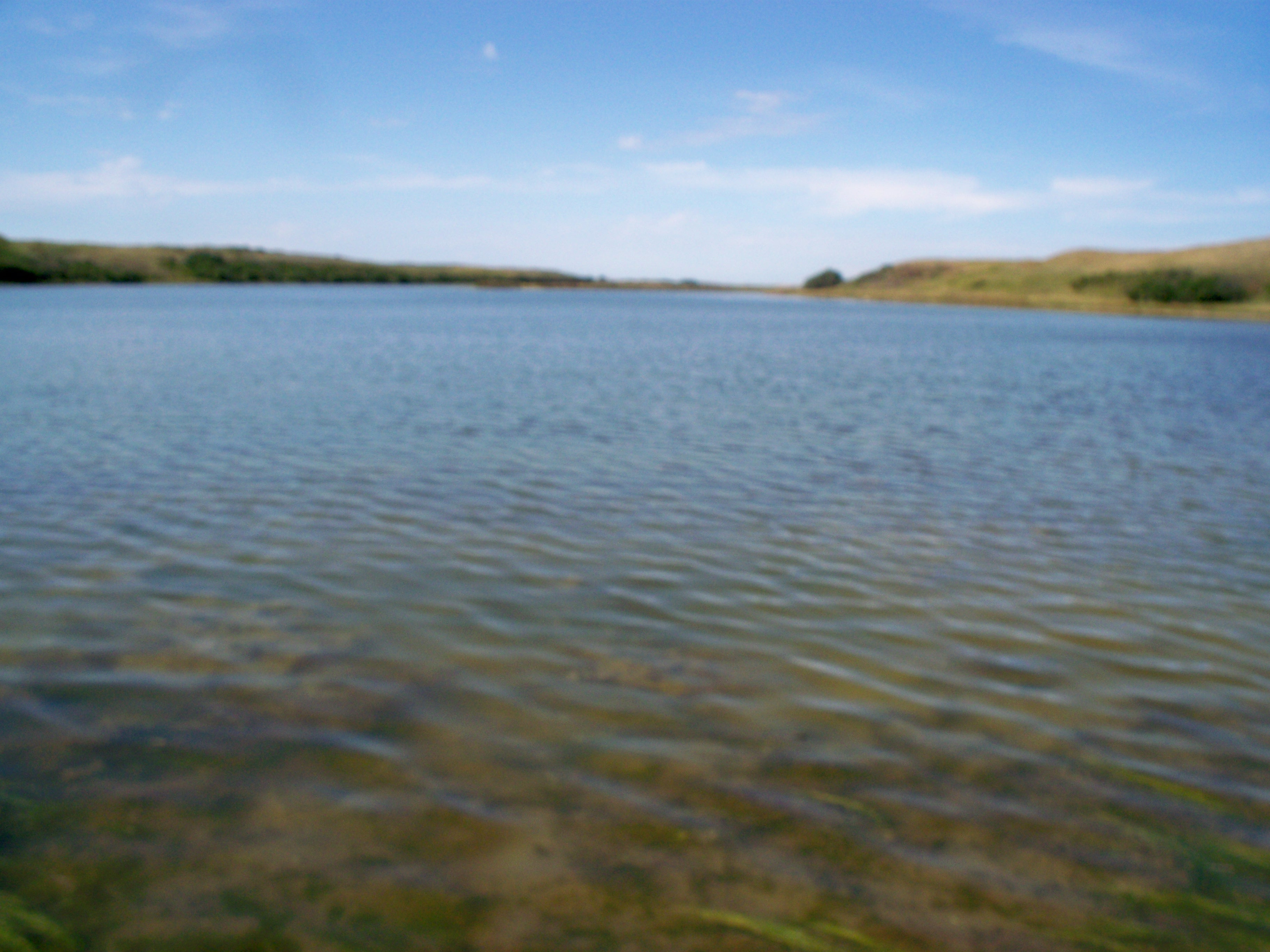
- Castlewood Lake

- Location in Saskatchewan Castlewood Lake (Canada)
- Location: RM of Biggar No. 347, Saskatchewan
- Coordinates: 52.0932°N 108.0918°W
- Part of: North Saskatchewan River drainage basin
- Basin countries: Canada
- Max. length: 5 km (3.1 mi)
- Max. width: 50 m (160 ft)
- Surface area: 267 ha (660 acres)
- Max. depth: 4 m (13 ft)
- Shore length^{1}: 18 km (11 mi)
- Surface elevation: 654 m (2,146 ft)
- Settlements: None
- ^{1} Shore length is not a well-defined measure.

Castlewood Lake is a lake in the Canadian province of Saskatchewan within the North Saskatchewan River drainage basin. The lake is in the Rural Municipality of Biggar No. 347, about 4.4 kilometres (2.7 mi) west of the town of Biggar. It is accessible from Highways 14 and 51. While there are no communities nor facilities at the lake, there is a small beach accessible to the public.

A railway line runs across a dam in the southern part of the lake effectively dividing the lake into two sections.

Other nearby lakes include Whiteshore Lake, Oban Lake, Coopers Lake, and Margery Lake.

== Wildlife ==
The surrounding landscape of Castlewood Lake is home to many types of animals and birds, such as gulls, salamanders, muskrats, coyotes, ducks, geese, rabbits, snails, and deer. There are no fish in the lake.

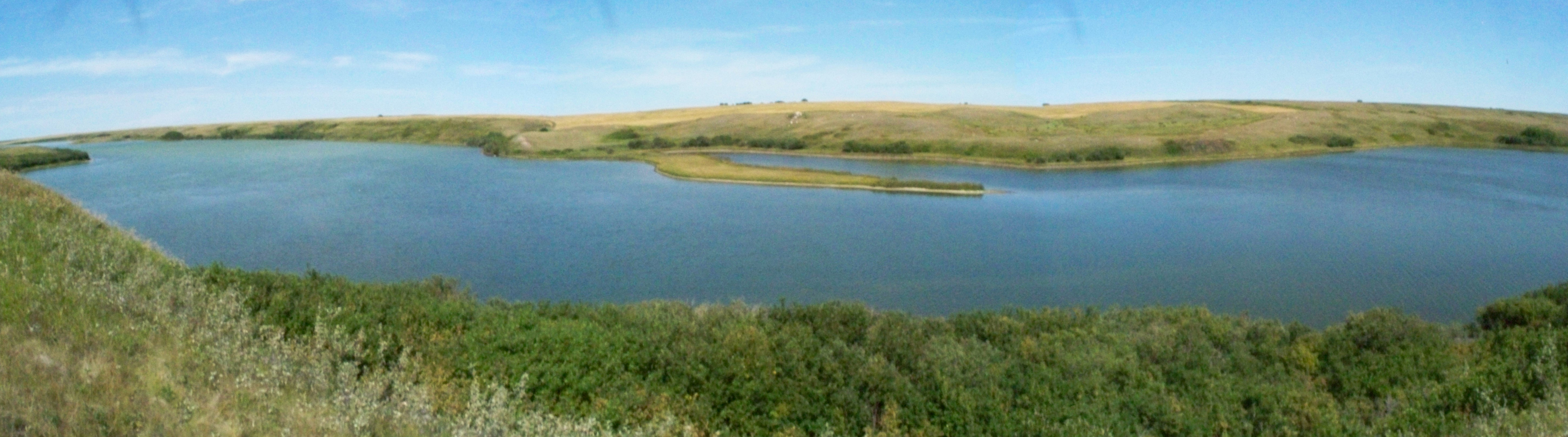
Castlewood Lake

== See also ==
- List of lakes of Saskatchewan
