= Dillberry Lake Provincial Park =

Provincial park in Alberta, Canada

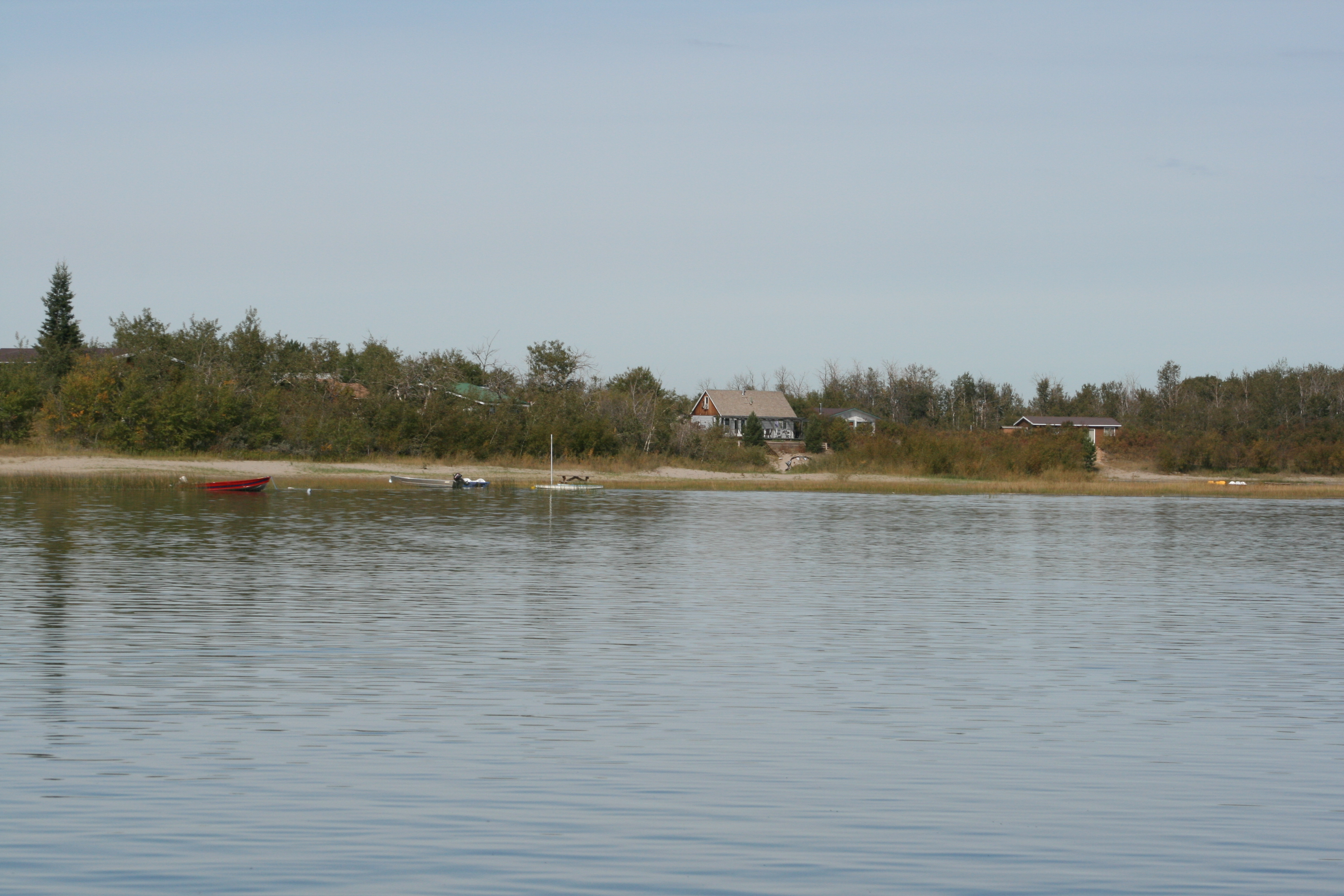

- Location within Alberta
- Interactive map of Dillberry Lake Provincial Park
- Location: Municipal District of Wainwright No. 61, Alberta, Canada
- Nearest city: Provost
- Coordinates: 52°35′47″N 110°04′51″W
- Area: 12.6 km^{2} (4.9 sq mi)
- Established: January 08, 1957
- Governing body: Alberta Tourism, Parks and Recreation

Dillberry Lake Provincial Park is a provincial park in Alberta, Canada, located 43 km (27 mi) north from Provost and 17 km (11 mi) south of Chauvin along Highway 17.

The park surrounds Killarney Lake, Leane Lake and Dillberry Lake, as well as other small lakes. It lies at an elevation of 620 m (2,030 ft) and has a surface of 12.6 km^{2} (4.9 sq mi). It was established on January 8, 1957 and is maintained by Alberta Tourism, Parks and Recreation.

== Activities ==
The following activities are available in the park:

- Beach activities (on two beaches, a day use beach and a campers beach) include sailing, swimming, water-skiing, windsurfing
- Birdwatching (the park is part of the Killarney, Dillberry & Leane Lakes Important Bird Area (IBA); bird species include ducks, geese, swans, herons, hermit thrush, lark sparrows, marsh wrens, yellow-headed blackbirds, western meadowlarks and Sprague's pipits)
- Camping
- Canoeing and kayaking
- Cross-country skiing
- Fishing and ice fishing (for rainbow trout)
- Front country hiking (Loon Loop and Ranger Loop are maintained trails)
- Horseshoes
- Power boating

== See also ==
- List of provincial parks in Alberta
- List of Canadian provincial parks
- List of National Parks of Canada
