= Argo, Saskatchewan =

Argo
- Unincorporated community
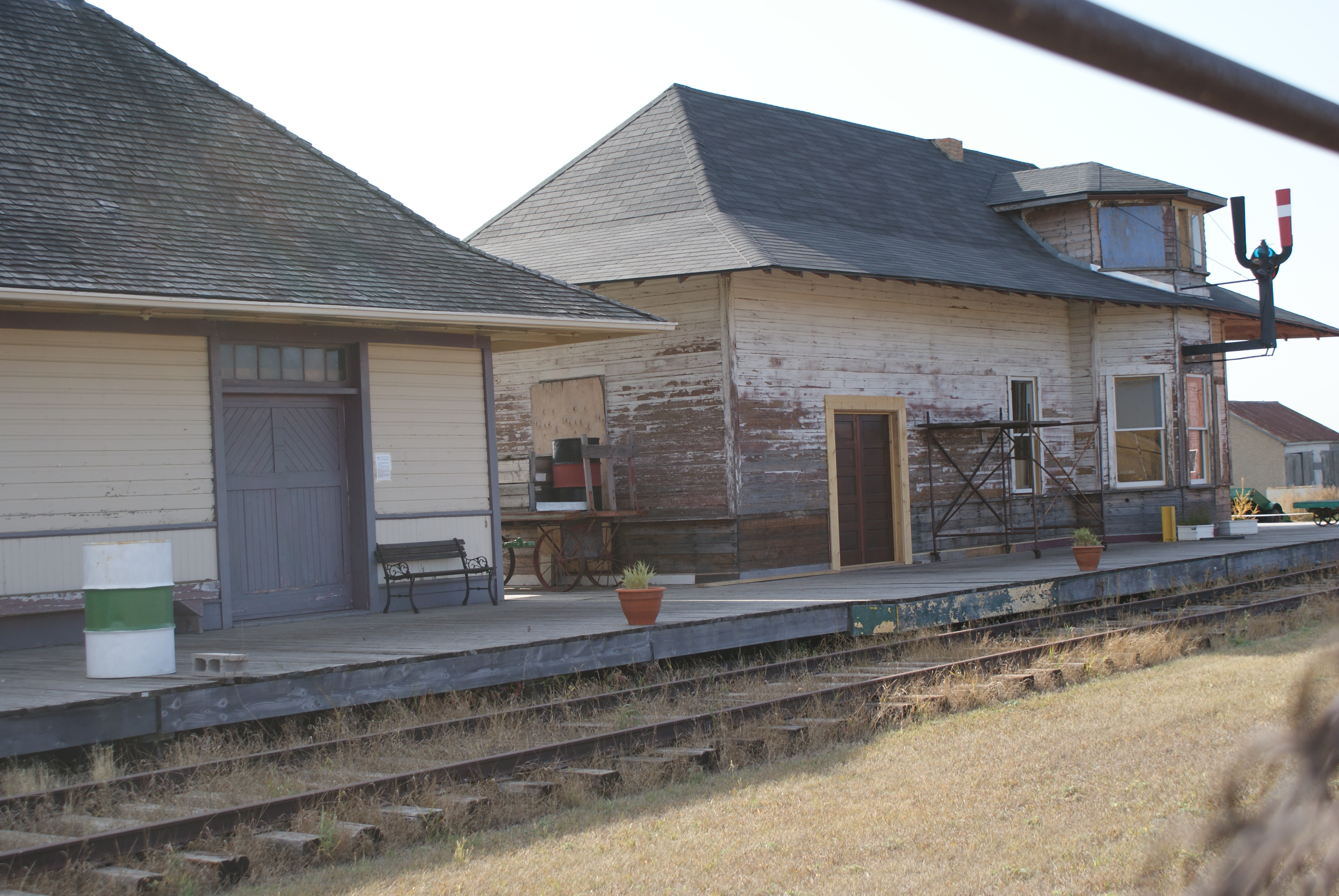
- Argo Train Station

- Location of [settlement] in Saskatchewan
- Coordinates: 52°01′0″N 108°06′0″W
- Country: Canada
- Province: Saskatchewan
- Rural Municipalities (R.M.): Biggar No. 347, Saskatchewan
- Post office founded: 1917-01-01
- Founder: Grand Trunk Pacific Railway
- Time zone: UTC−6 (CST)

Argo is an unincorporated community or a siding administered by the rural municipality of Biggar No. 347, in the Canadian province of Saskatchewan. Argo was on the Dodsland Branch of the Canadian National Railway between Biggar and Duperow. The closest town is Biggar to the northeast. Biggar railway station is a divisional point for the Canadian National Railway (CNR).

== Demographics ==
The unincorporated area of Argo is enumerated in the rural municipality (RM) of Biggar No. 347, Saskatchewan. The statistics for the RM show a rural population of 867 residents.

Canada census – Argo, Saskatchewan community profile

Population
Land area
Population density
Median age
Private dwellings
Median household income

N/A = Data Not Available

== See also ==
- List of communities in Saskatchewan
