= Dillberry Lake (Alberta) =

Lake in Alberta and Saskatchewan, Canada

- Location within Alberta
- Location: Municipal District of Wainwright No. 61, Alberta / Senlac No. 411, Saskatchewan
- Coordinates: 52°34′37″N 110°00′33″W
- Basin countries: Canada
- Max. length: 0.8 km (0.50 mi)
- Max. width: 0.9 km (0.56 mi)
- Surface area: 0.80 km^{2} (0.31 sq mi)
- Average depth: 2.8 m (9 ft 2 in)
- Max. depth: 10.7 m (35 ft)
- Surface elevation: 623 m (2,044 ft)
- References: Dillberry Lake

Dillberry Lake is a lake that lies on the border between Alberta and Saskatchewan. Approximately one-half of the lake lies in each province. The Alberta half also lies within Dillberry Lake Provincial Park.
