= Oban, Saskatchewan =

Community in Saskatchewan, Canada

Oban
- Unincorporated area
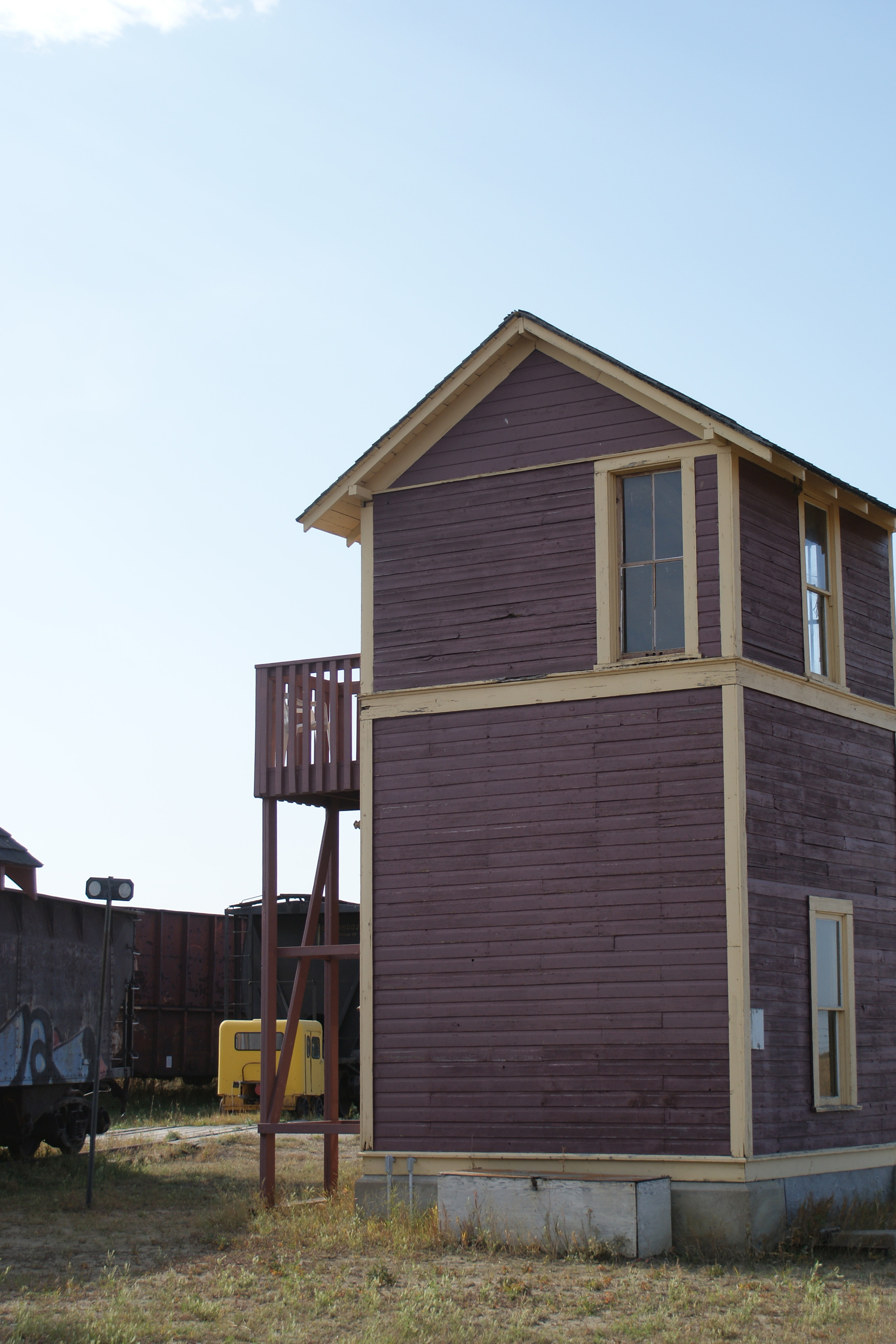
- Oban Interlocking Tower
- Nicknames: Oban Station, Oban siding
- Location in Saskatchewan Oban (Canada)
- Coordinates: 52°07′38″N 108°08′32″W
- Country: Canada
- Province: Saskatchewan
- Rural Municipalities (RM): Biggar No. 347
- Post office founded: 1 July 1912
- Founder: Grand Trunk Pacific Railway
- Named for: Oban
- Time zone: UTC−6 (Central Standard Time)

Oban is an unincorporated area administered by the Rural Municipality of Biggar No. 347, in the Canadian province of Saskatchewan. Oban is on Highway 14 in western Saskatchewan. The closest town is Biggar to the southeast. Biggar railway station is a divisional point for the Canadian National Railway (CNR). Oban had the last provincial interlocking tower at the Canadian National Railway and Canadian Pacific Railway (CPR) level crossing, which was constructed in 1910 and closed in 1990.

== History ==
The name Oban is from the community Oban in Argyll, Scotland.

== Economy ==
The community had a grain elevator and post office till the 1960s. The Oban Salt Company opened in 1937.

== Law and government ==
The Reeve and council of the RM of Biggar No. 347 provide the rural area with government and infrastructure maintenance. Oban is within the provincial constituency of Biggar and elects a Member of the Legislative Assembly (MLA) Oban is represented by a member of Parliament (MP) representing the federal electoral district of Saskatoon—Rosetown—Biggar.

== Demographics ==
The population is enumerated as a part of the RM of Biggar No. 347. These statistics are for the RM.

Canada census – Oban, Saskatchewan community profile

Population
Land area
Population density
Median age
Private dwellings
Median household income

N/A = Data Not Available

== Education ==
Historically Oban School District #4733 was located at Township 37, Range 16 West of the 3rd Meridian.

== Transportation ==
In 1925 Oban was located on the Minnedosa–Saskatoon–Edmonton CPR branch line between Castlewood, and Naseby. The CPR was intersected by the CNR GTP West. Oban was located on the CNR between Biggar and Palo. Oban was also a part of the Porter Subdivision, CNR between Lett and Biggar.

== Infrastructure ==
Oban had the last interlocking tower in the province, at the Canadian National Railway and Canadian Pacific Railway level crossing, which was constructed in 1910 and closed in 1990. The tower has been moved to the Saskatchewan Railway Museum.

Oban tower was a requirement for the Grand Trunk Pacific Railway when it wanted to cross the existing CPR rail tracks. (The Canadian Northern Railway was amalgamated with the Grand Trunk Railway by the Dominion Government to form the Canadian National Railways in 1919.) Oban tower consisted of a 16-frame interlocking machine. There were levers attached to pipes and cranks which controlled semaphore signals and derails. If an approaching train did not react to the signals at the crossing, the derails were utilized, causing a minor accident and averting a major collision. The signals were 1,750 feet (530 m) and 1,200 feet (370 m) from the crossing. At 55 feet (17 m) from the crossing the derail would be encountered if the train did not stop at the signal.

There were 8,800 miles (14,200 km) of railway track in the province of Saskatchewan. Rail companies intersected 58 times at level crossings. Some of these were railway lines crossing municipal street car lines. There were 36 Saskatchewan crossings which were controlled by mechanical interlocking machines between the early 1900s and 1990.

== Photo gallery ==
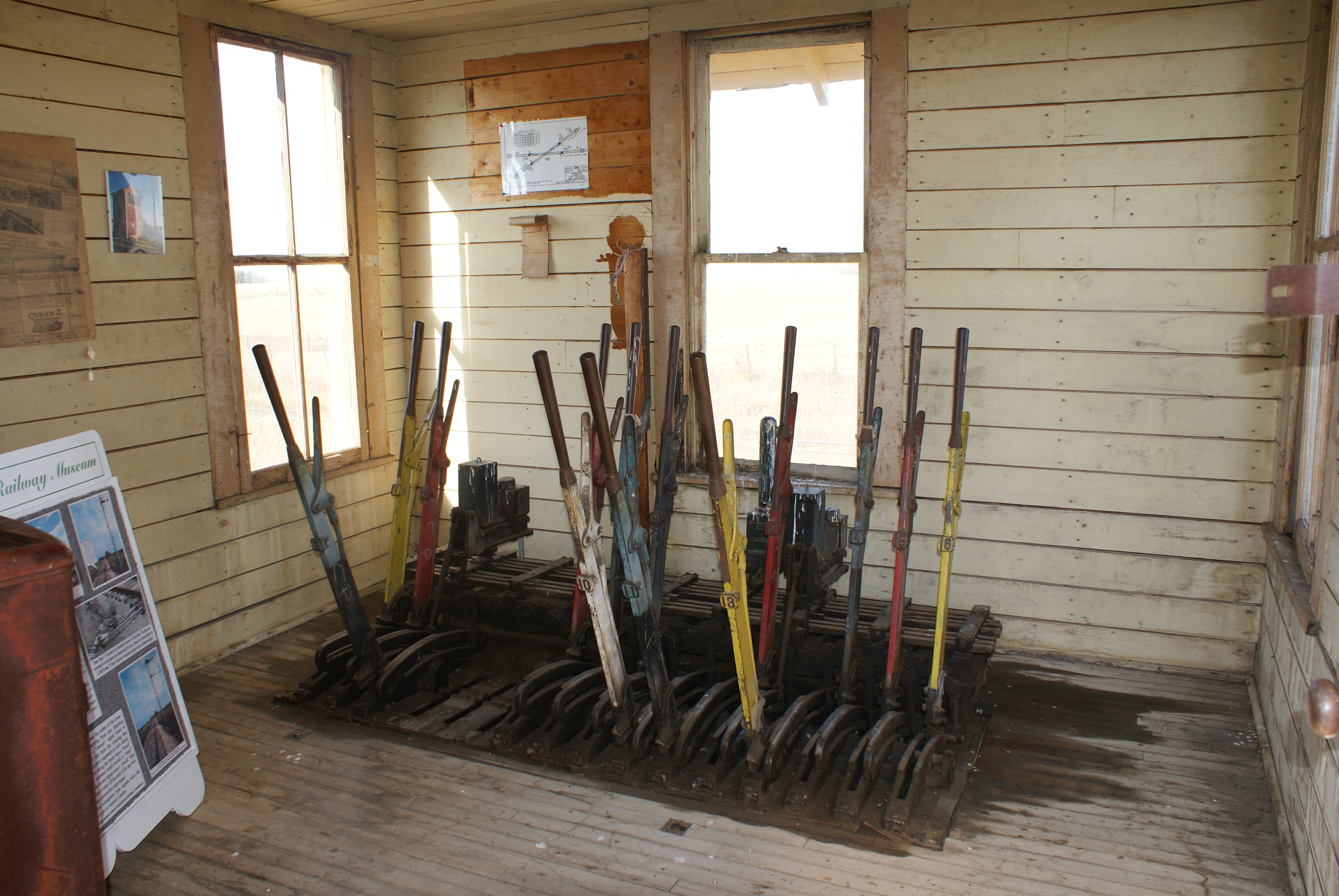
Lever frame

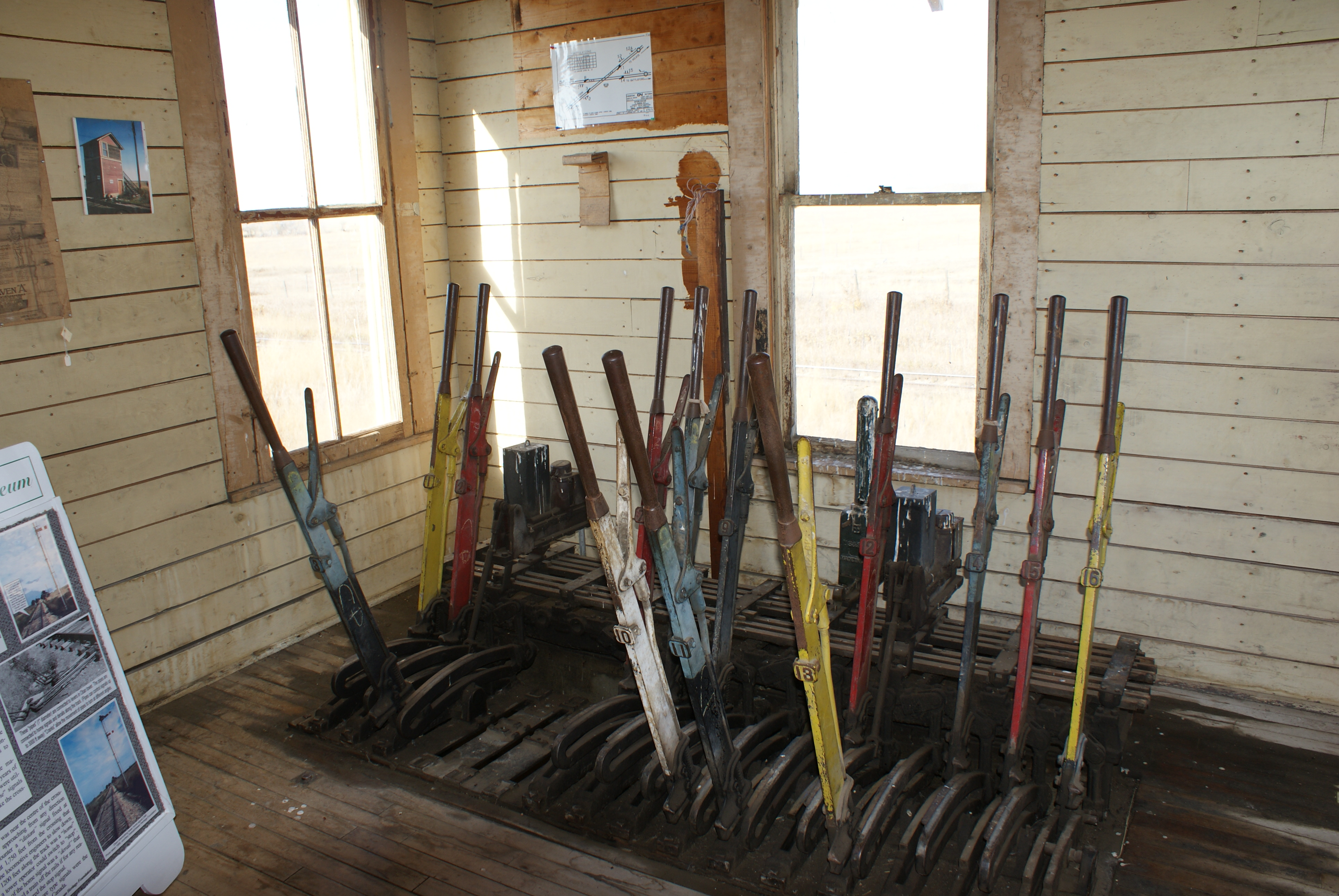
Lever frame

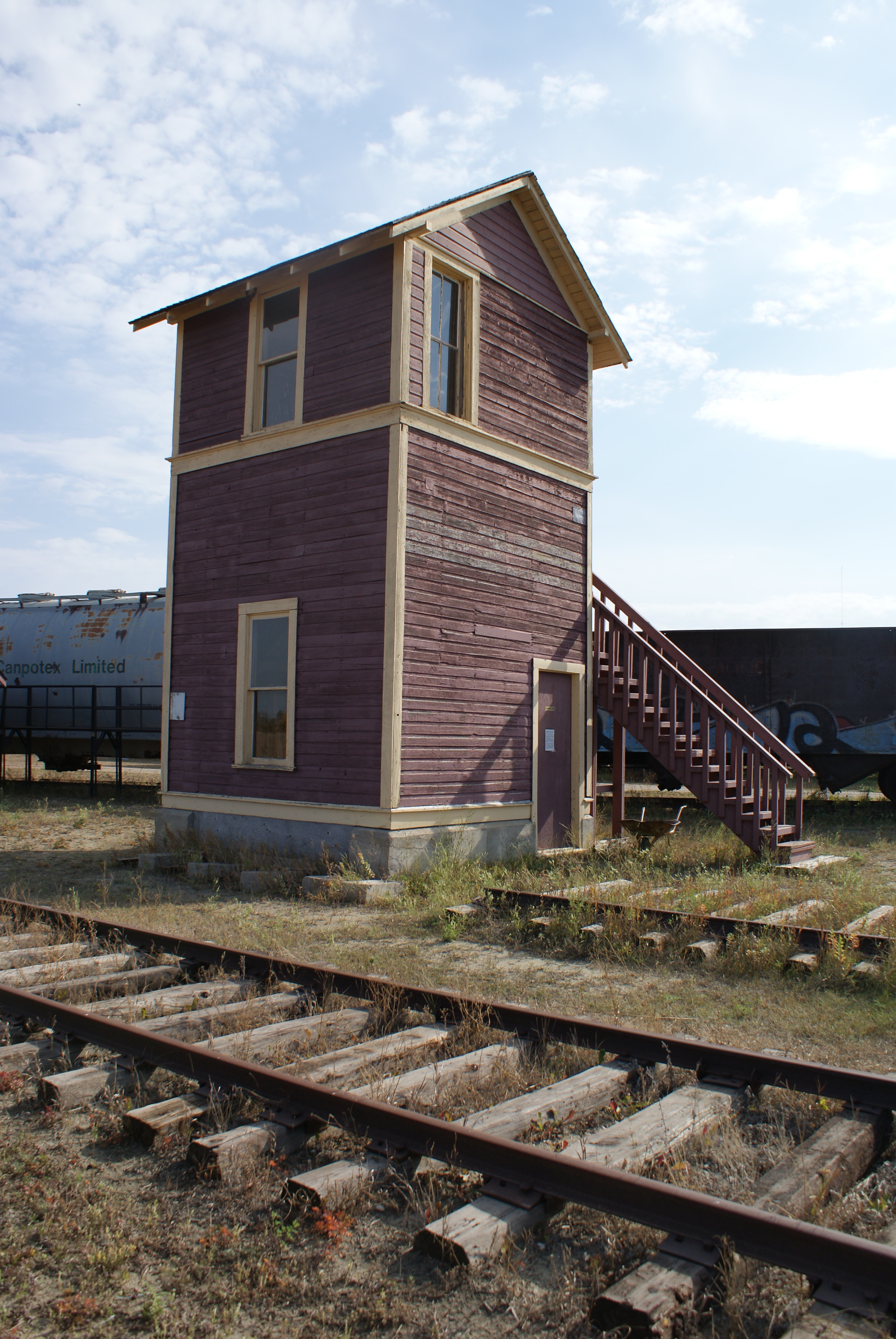
Interlocking tower

== See also ==
- List of communities in Saskatchewan
- List of rural municipalities in Saskatchewan
