= Hope Valley, Alberta =

Rural locality in Alberta, Canada

Coordinates: 52.96685°N 110.58492°W

Hope Valley is an unincorporated community in Alberta, Canada, situated in Municipal District of Wainwright No. 61. The location in the Canadian TV series, When Calls the Heart, is named after this real life location in Season 1, named Coal Valley.

== Toponymy ==
Hope Valley was named on account of the hopeful spirit of the first settlers.

== History ==
In August 1911, a post office opened at the area, operating until January 1948. It expressed optimism of early settlers due to the position of the post office in a valley.
