= Saskatoon station =

Railway station in Saskatoon, Saskatchewan, Canada

Saskatoon
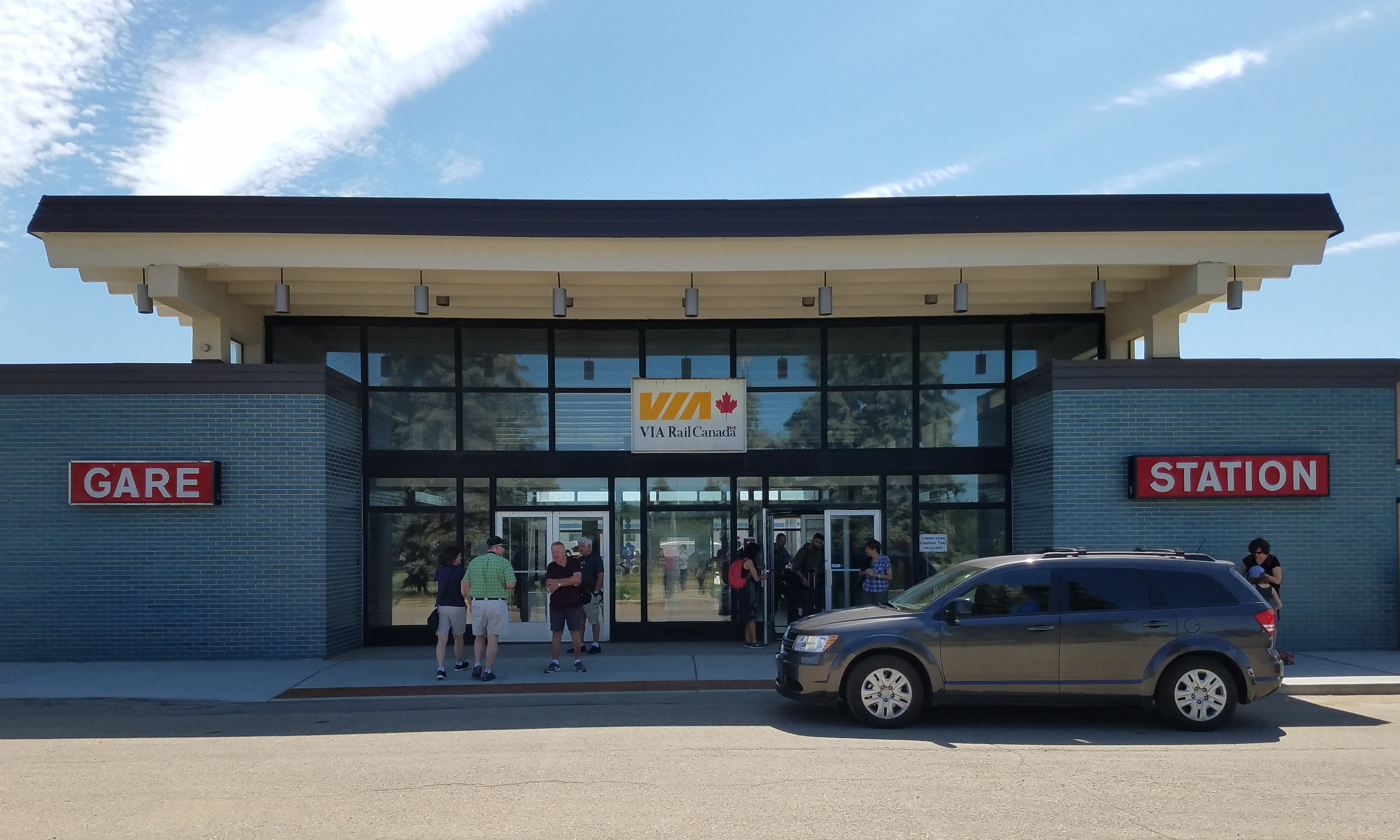

General information
- Location: Unit 38, 1701, Chappell Drive, Saskatoon, SK; Canada
- Coordinates: 52°06′19″N 106°44′18″W
- Platforms: 1 side platform
- Tracks: 1

Construction
- Structure type: Staffed station
- Parking: yes

History
- Opened: 1964; 62 years ago

Services
Preceding station	Via Rail	Following station
Biggar toward Vancouver	The Canadian	Watrous toward Toronto
Former services (from 1964)
Preceding station	Canadian National Railway	Following station
Biggar toward Vancouver	Main Line	Clavet toward Montreal
Terminus	Saskatoon – Prince Albert	Richmond toward Prince Albert
Terminus	Saskatoon – Regina	Clarence Avenue toward Prince Albert
Preceding station	Via Rail	Following station
Edmonton toward Vancouver	Super Continental	Winnipeg toward Toronto

Heritage Railway Station (Canada)
- Official name: VIA Rail (Union) Station
- Designated: 1996
- Reference no.: 4576
Location

The Saskatoon station is a railway station in Saskatoon, Saskatchewan, Canada. The city's only active railway station, it is located eight kilometers from the central business district. When it opened, the station hosted several arrivals and departures each day, although it is now only serviced by Via Rail's The Canadian. The station is equipped with a ticket counter, and waiting room. The station was declared a heritage railway station by the federal government in 1996.

The station was built in 1964 in the International Style, as part of the Chappell rail yards, by Canadian National Railway as a union station replacing the Old Canadian Pacific Saskatoon Railway Station.
