= Palo, Saskatchewan =

Community in Saskatchewan, Canada

Palo
- Unincorporated – Hamlet
- Location in Saskatchewan Palo (Canada)
- Coordinates: 52°10′01″N 108°18′05″W
- Country: Canada
- Province: Saskatchewan
- Region: West Central
- Census division: 6
- Rural municipality: Rosemount No. 378
- Post Office Established: 1923-06-01 (closed 1968-05-11)

Government
  - Governing body: Rosemount No. 378
  - Reeve: A. Ed Egert
  - Administrator: Kara Kirilenko
- Time zone: CST
- Postal code: S0N 2G0
- Area code: 306
- Highways: Highway 14
- Railways: Canadian Pacific Railway

Palo is a hamlet in the Rural Municipality of Rosemount No. 378, Saskatchewan, Canada. Palo used to have a Grand Trunk Pacific Railway station, and is near Canadian National Railway's Wainwright Subdivision. Palo is home to the Palo Mine facility on Whiteshore Lake.

Access to the community is from Highway 14. The CN Rail Watrous line runs through Palo and the CPKC Wilke Rail line is nearby. At the mine site, there is an abandoned airfield.

== Palo Mine ==
Palo Mine, also known as Whiteshore Lake Mine, is a sodium sulphate mine with a purity of 98 to 99%. The Whiteshore Lake bed is the mineral source. Sodium sulphate production at the site began in 1934 with an initial resource estimate of 5.9 million tonnes. Whiteshore Lake is a post-glacial, evaporative playa lake.

The Palo Mine is currently owned by the Saskatoon-based Upcycle Minerals Inc. It was formerly owned by Nanostructured Mineral Corporation ("NMC") and ZEOX Corporation (ZEOX). In October 2008, Otish had signed an agreement with Nanostructured Minerals to acquire potash mineral rights in the Palo area.

On March 16, 2026 Upcycle Minerals announced the completion of 50 exploratory drilling holes at the 3,360-acre mining site. The project "was designed to assess sodium sulfate mineralization and provide the basis for a NI 43-101 compliant mineral resource estimate". Core samples from the drilling project encountered layers of crystal beds, brine, and gyttja.

Upcycle Minerals plans on using solar-powered brine mining to extract the minerals from the water, which was the method previously employed at Palo Mine. This is a common method used at other alkali deposits around Saskatchewan.

== See also ==
- List of communities in Saskatchewan
- List of hamlets in Saskatchewan
- List of mines in Saskatchewan
