= Ribstone =

- Locality (former hamlet)
- Location of Ribstone Ribstone (Canada)
- Coordinates: 52°42′25″N 110°15′52″W
- Country: Canada
- Province: Alberta
- Region: Central Alberta
- Census division: 7
- Municipal district: MD of Wainwright No. 61
- Settled: 1905
- Hamlet designation repealed: January 16, 2024

Government
  - Type: Unincorporated
  - Governing body: MD of Wainwright No. 61 Council

Population (2007)
  - Total: 30
- Time zone: UTC−06:00 (Alberta Time)
- Area codes: 780, 587, 825

Ribstone is a locality in central Alberta, Canada within the Municipal District (MD) of Wainwright No. 61. It is located approximately 16 kilometres (9.9 mi) south of Highway 14 and 65 kilometres (40 mi) southwest of Lloydminster.

== History ==
Ribstone was settled in 1905 by wagon. Its hamlet designation was repealed by the MD of Wainwright No. 61 on January 21, 2024, making it a locality.

== Demographics ==
The population of Ribstone according to the 2007 municipal census conducted by the Municipal District of Wainwright No. 61 is 30.

== See also ==
- List of communities in Alberta
