= Heath, Alberta =

Locality in Alberta, Canada

Coordinates: 52°48′N 110°36′W

Location of Heath Alberta

Heath is an unincorporated community in central Alberta in the Municipal District of Wainwright No. 61, located 5 kilometres (3.1 mi) south of Highway 14, 66 kilometres (41 mi) southwest of Lloydminster.

== Toponymy ==
The community was named after a chief official of the Grand Trunk Pacific Water Department.

== History ==
Heath was a former station. The Grand Trunk Pacific Railway established a station in the area around 1908. On January 1, 1911, a post office was established.
