= Rural Municipality of Biggar No. 347 =

Rural municipality in Saskatchewan, Canada

Biggar No. 347
- Rural municipality
- Rural Municipality of Biggar No. 347
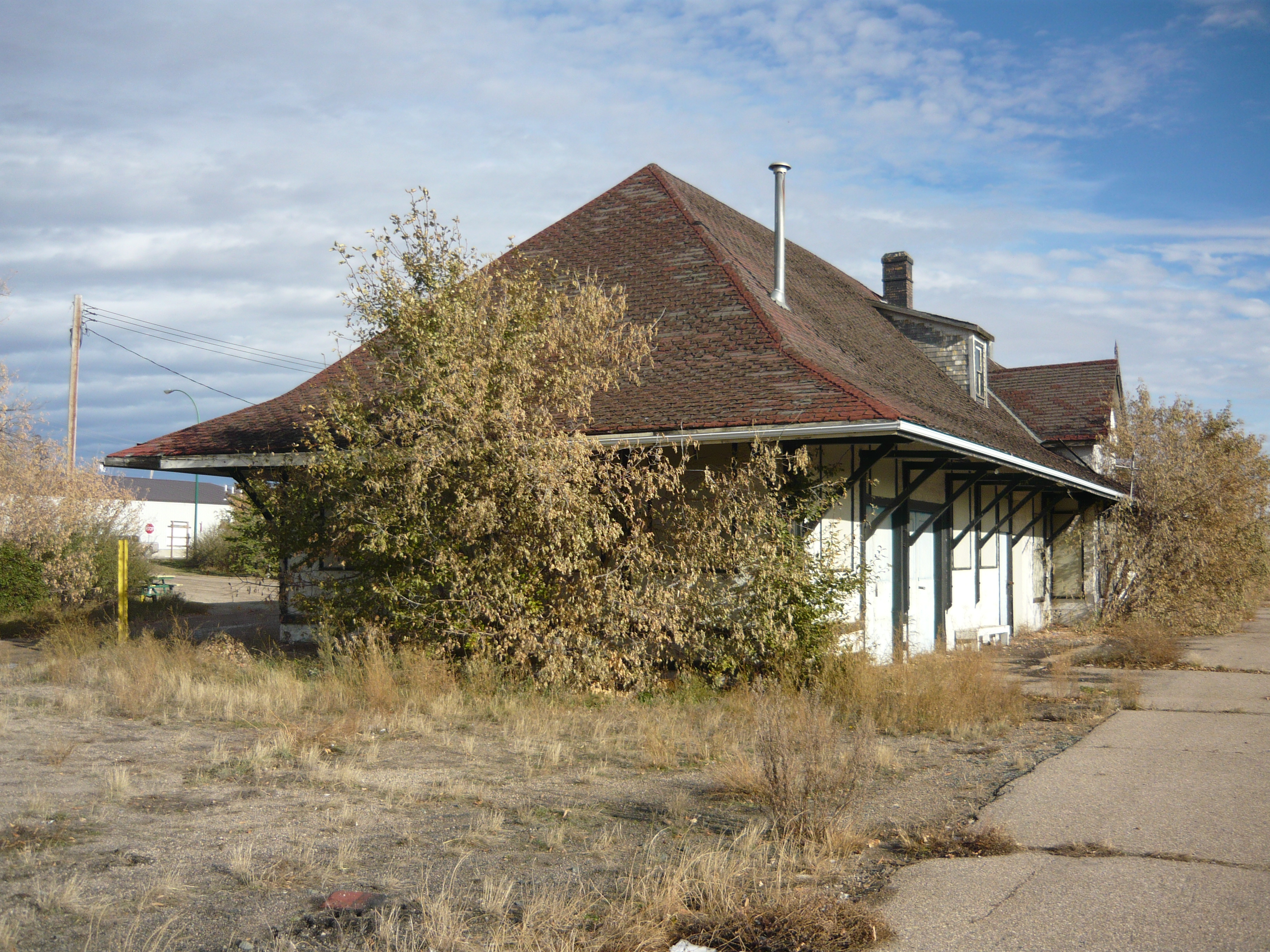
- Biggar railway station a National Historic Site of Canada

- Location of the RM of Biggar No. 347 in Saskatchewan
- Coordinates: 52.087°N 108.150°W
- Country: Canada
- Province: Saskatchewan
- Census division: 12
- SARM division: 6
- Formed: December 11, 1911

Government
  - Reeve: Jeanne Marie de Moissac
  - Governing body: RM of Biggar No. 347 Council
  - Administrator: Sandi Silvernagle
  - Office location: Biggar

Area (2016)
  - Land: 1,598.56 km^{2} (617.21 sq mi)

Population (2016)
  - Total: 798
  - Density: 0.5/km^{2} (1.3/sq mi)
- Time zone: CST
  - Summer (DST): CST
- Postal code: S0K 0M0
- Area codes: 306 and 639
- Highway(s): Highway 4 Highway 14; Highway 51; Highway 658
- Railway(s): Canadian National Railway; Canadian Pacific Railway

The Rural Municipality of Biggar No. 347 (2016 population: 798) is a rural municipality (RM) in the Canadian province of Saskatchewan within Census Division No. 12 and SARM Division No. 6.

== History ==
The RM of Biggar No. 347 incorporated as a rural municipality on December 11, 1911.

== Geography ==
=== Communities and localities ===
The following urban municipalities are surrounded by the RM.

Towns

- Biggar

The following unincorporated communities are within the RM.

Special service areas

- Springwater (dissolved as a village December 31, 2006)

Localities

- Argo
- Castlewood
- Cazalet
- Duperow
- Monarchvale
- Naseby
- Neola
- Oban
- Vance

== Biggar & District Regional Park ==
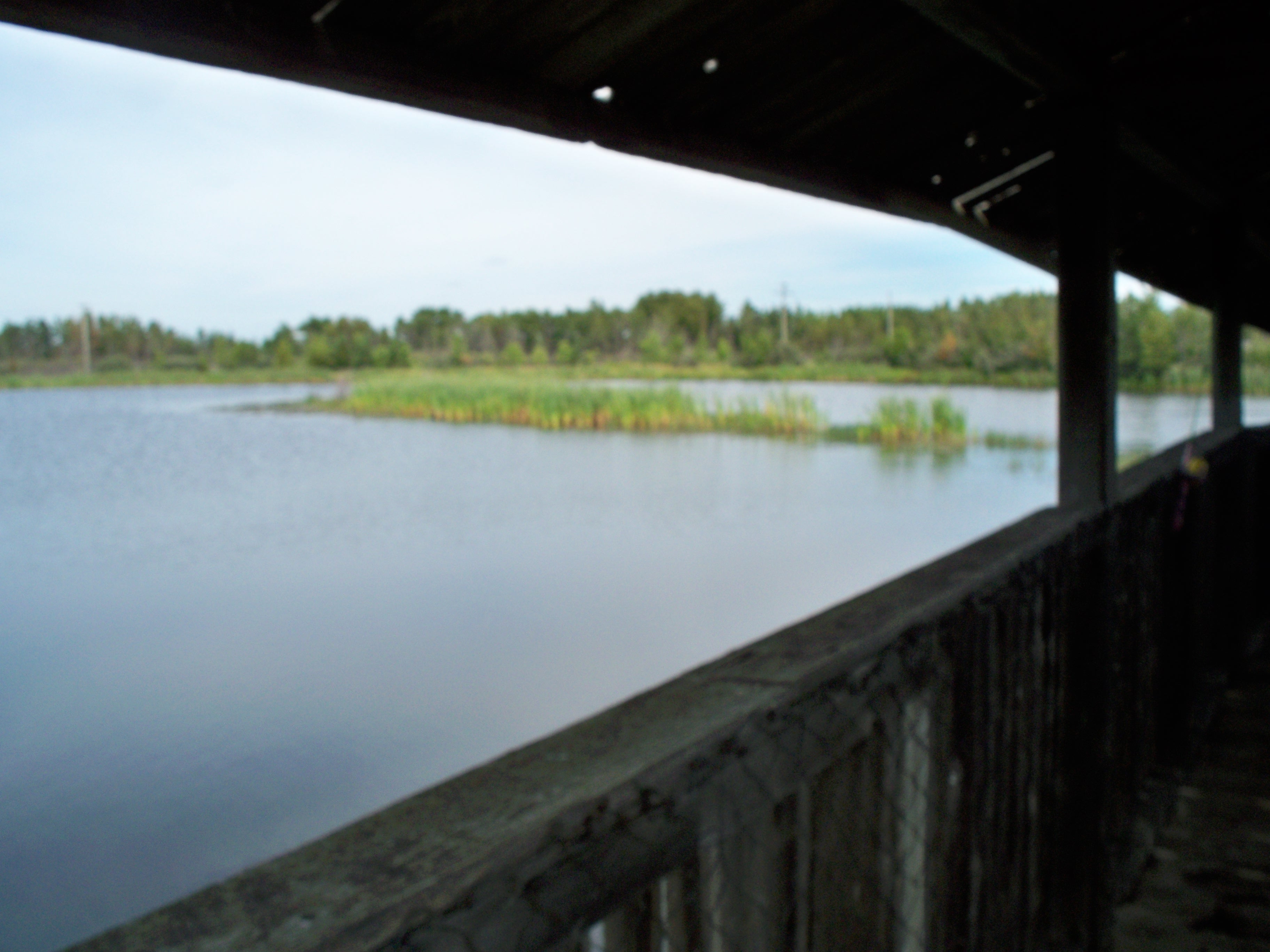
Biggar Trout Pond

Biggar & District Regional Park (52.0792°N 107.9756°W) is a small regional park located about 1 kilometre (0.62 mi) north of Biggar on Highway 4. The park has an 11-site campground and an open area for group camping that has two cook shacks. Just north of the campground is the 9-hole, grass greens golf course. Each hole has two spots to tee off from. Alongside the golf course the Biggar Trout Pond. The pond is stocked regularly with rainbow trout and has a covered fishing bridge.

Biggar Trout Pond started out as farmland in the 1960s. Later, the land was bought for a 9-hole golf course. Having some land left, and already having a slough there, the town dug a 5 ft-deep (1.5 m), 200 m × 200 m (660 ft × 660 ft) hole in the ground and filled it with water. Now it has an island and a fishing bridge.

== Demographics ==
Population history (1981–2016)
Year	Pop.	±%
1981	1,083	—
1986	1,122	+3.6%
1991	1,057	−5.8%
1996	1,022	−3.3%
2001	1,032	+1.0%
2006	867	−16.0%
2011	820	−5.4%
2016	798	−2.7%
Source: Statistics Canada via Saskatchewan Bureau of Statistics

In the 2021 Census of Population conducted by Statistics Canada, the RM of Biggar No. 347 had a population of 805 living in 264 of its 307 total private dwellings, a change of 0.9% from its 2016 population of 798. With a land area of 1,576.09 km^{2} (608.53 sq mi), it had a population density of 0.5/km^{2} (1.3/sq mi) in 2021.

In the 2016 Census of Population, the RM of Biggar No. 347 recorded a population of 798 living in 262 of its 307 total private dwellings, a −2.7% change from its 2011 population of 820. With a land area of 1,598.56 km^{2} (617.21 sq mi), it had a population density of 0.5/km^{2} (1.3/sq mi) in 2016.

== Government ==
The RM of Biggar No. 347 is governed by an elected municipal council and an appointed administrator that meets on the third Tuesday of every month. The reeve of the RM is Jeanne Marie de Moissac while its administrator is Sandi Silvernagle. The RM's office is located in Biggar.

== See also ==
- List of rural municipalities in Saskatchewan
