= Venn, Saskatchewan =

Venn
- Unincorporated community
- Location within Saskatchewan Location within Canada
- Coordinates: 51.6167°N 105.3006°W
- Country: Canada
- Province: Saskatchewan
- Region: Saskatchewan
- Census division: 11
- Rural Municipality: Wreford
- Established: N/A
- Incorporated (Village): N/A

Government
  - Former Mayor: Archie Smiley
  - Administrator: Lacelle Kim
  - Governing body: Reno No. 51

Population (2006)
  - Total: 14
- Time zone: CST
- Area code: 306
- Highways: Twp Rd 310
- Waterways: Boulder Lake

Venn is an unincorporated community in the south-central region of Saskatchewan, Canada, located 20 kilometres (12 mi) southeast of the town of Watrous, about 10 km east of Highway 2.

== History ==
Venn, like almost every other town in Saskatchewan, once had its own wood crib grain elevator, but it was demolished in 2003. Many small towns throughout Canada like Venn have lost their grain elevators due to the consolidation of smaller grain companies to larger ones.

In its glory days, Venn had all the amenities of a small town, such as a number of businesses like restaurants, stores, and a bar, as well as a community hall. Due to not having a reliable source of drinking water, the small town began its slow decline, beginning in the 1950s and 1960s. Its population declined until it became a semi-ghost town.

== See also ==
- List of communities in Saskatchewan
