= Rural Municipality of Rosemount No. 378 =

Rural municipality in Saskatchewan, Canada

Rosemount No. 378
- Rural municipality
- Rural Municipality of Rosemount No. 378
- Location of the RM of Rosemount No. 378 in Saskatchewan
- Coordinates: 52.216°N 108.266°W
- Country: Canada
- Province: Saskatchewan
- Census division: 12
- SARM division: 6
- Formed: December 12, 1910

Government
  - Reeve: Albert L. Kammer
  - Governing body: RM of Rosemount No. 378 Council
  - Administrator: Kara Kirilenko
  - Office location: Landis

Area (2016)
  - Land: 571.35 km^{2} (220.60 sq mi)

Population (2016)
  - Total: 201
  - Density: 0.4/km^{2} (1.0/sq mi)
- Time zone: CST
  - Summer (DST): CST
- Area codes: 306 and 639

The Rural Municipality of Rosemount No. 378 (2016 population: 201) is a rural municipality (RM) in the Canadian province of Saskatchewan within Census Division No. 12 and SARM Division No. 6.

== History ==
The RM of Rosemount No. 378 incorporated as a rural municipality on December 12, 1910.

== Geography ==
=== Communities and localities ===
The following unincorporated communities are within the RM.

Localities

- Cando (dissolved as a village, December 31, 2005)
- Lett
- Naseby
- Palo
- Salter
- Traynor

== Demographics ==
Population history (1981–2016)
Year	Pop.	±%
1981	301	—
1986	252	−16.3%
1991	223	−11.5%
1996	208	−6.7%
2001	188	−9.6%
2006	230	+22.3%
2011	198	−13.9%
2016	201	+1.5%
Source: Statistics Canada via Saskatchewan Bureau of Statistics

In the 2021 Census of Population conducted by Statistics Canada, the RM of Rosemount No. 378 had a population of 175 living in 78 of its 98 total private dwellings, a change of −12.9% from its 2016 population of 201. With a land area of 561.28 km^{2} (216.71 sq mi), it had a population density of 0.3/km^{2} (0.8/sq mi) in 2021.

In the 2016 Census of Population, the RM of Rosemount No. 378 recorded a population of 201 living in 84 of its 92 total private dwellings, a 1.5% change from its 2011 population of 198. With a land area of 571.35 km^{2} (220.60 sq mi), it had a population density of 0.4/km^{2} (0.9/sq mi) in 2016.

== Government ==
The RM of Rosemount No. 378 is governed by an elected municipal council and an appointed administrator that meets on the second Wednesday of every month. The reeve of the RM is Albert L. Kammer while its administrator is Kara Kirilenko. The RM's office is located in Landis.

== Transportation ==
- Saskatchewan Highway 4
- Saskatchewan Highway 14
- Saskatchewan Highway 656
- Canadian Pacific Railway

== See also ==
- List of rural municipalities in Saskatchewan
