= Greenshields, Alberta =

Greenshields
- Hamlet
- Location of Greenshields Greenshields (Canada)
- Coordinates: 52°47′39″N 110°45′59″W
- Country: Canada
- Province: Alberta
- Region: Central Alberta
- Census division: 7
- Municipal district: Municipal District of Wainwright No. 61

Government
  - Type: Unincorporated
  - Governing body: Municipal District of Wainwright No. 61 Council

Population (2007)
  - Total: 80
- Time zone: UTC−06:00 (Alberta Time)
- Area codes: 780, 587, 825

Greenshields is a hamlet in central Alberta, Canada within the Municipal District of Wainwright No. 61. It is located 4 kilometres (2.5 mi) east of Highway 41, approximately 74 kilometres (46 mi) southwest of Lloydminster.

The community has the name of E. B. Greenshields, a railroad official.

== Demographics ==
The population of Greenshields according to the 2007 municipal census conducted by the Municipal District of Wainwright No. 61 is 80.

== See also ==
- List of communities in Alberta
- List of hamlets in Alberta
