= Baird, Ontario =

Baird
- Location within Ontario
- Coordinates: 48.4241667°N 89.4252778°W
- Country: Canada
- Province: Ontario
- Township: Oliver Paipoonge

Baird is a settlement and former railway station in the township of Oliver Paipoonge in the Canadian province of Ontario. It was formerly served by the Lake Superior Branch of the Grand Trunk Pacific Railway, but the GTP line from near Conmee, Ontario to Fort William, Ontario was abandoned in 1924.

For postal purposes, Baird is considered part of nearby Murillo.

== Churches ==
St. Augustine Church (Roman Catholic)
