= Hawkins, Alberta =

Locality in Alberta, Canada

Hawkins
- Location in Alberta
- Coordinates: 52.86684°N 111.10166°W
- Country: Canada
- Province: Alberta

Hawkins is an unincorporated community in central Alberta, Canada, situated in the Municipal District of Wainwright No. 61. It is located 24 km (15 mi) west from the town of Wainwright, and 41 km (25 mi) southwest from the town of Hardisty.

== Toponymy ==
Hawkins got its name from an accountant who worked for the rail line, located among the Grand Trunk Pacific Railway.

== History ==
Hawkins was a former station. In 1909, a Grand Trunk Pacific Railway station was established. Hawkins' agreement date was on April 5, 1951.
