= Chauvin, Alberta =

Chauvin
- Village
- Village of Chauvin
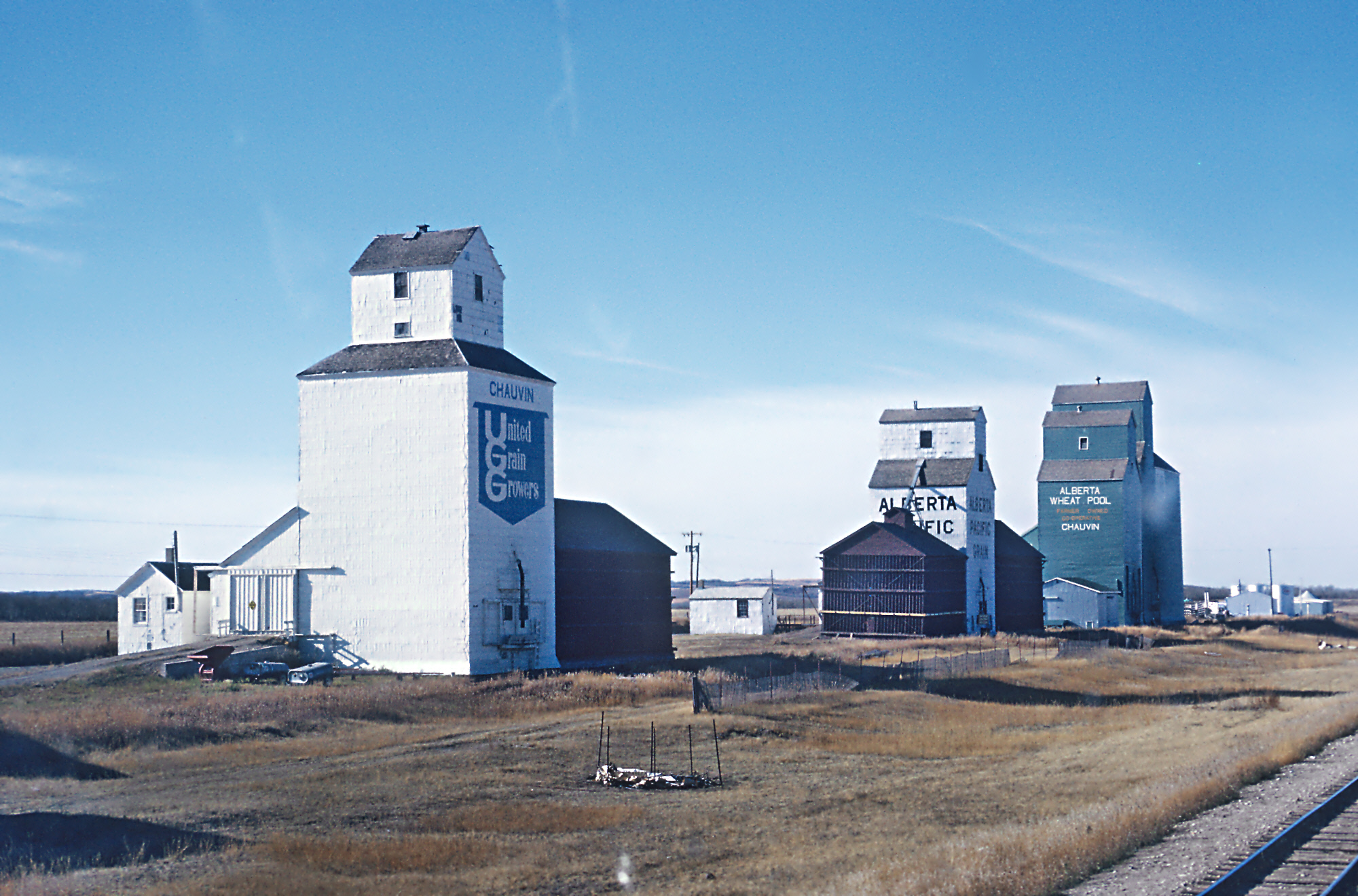

- Location in Alberta
- Coordinates: 52°41′52.1″N 110°08′27.4″W
- Country: Canada
- Province: Alberta
- Region: Central Alberta
- Census division: 7
- Municipal district: Municipal District of Wainwright No. 61
- Incorporated
  - Village: December 30, 1912

Government
  - Mayor: Alan Dow
  - Governing body: Chauvin Village Council

Area (2021)
  - Land: 2.22 km^{2} (0.86 sq mi)
- Elevation: 625 m (2,051 ft)

Population (2021)
  - Total: 304
  - Density: 136.9/km^{2} (355/sq mi)
  - Municipal census (2016): 345
- Time zone: UTC−06:00 (Alberta Time)
- Highways: Highway 17
- Secondary Highway: Highway 610
- Website: Official website

Chauvin (/ˈʃɑːvɪn/ SHAH-vin) is a village in east central Alberta, Canada. It is located 60 kilometres (37 mi) east of Wainwright, and 10 kilometres (6.2 mi) west of the Saskatchewan border. It is also the home of Susie the Softball, the world's largest softball.

== History ==
Chauvin started as a railroad siding in 1908. It was incorporated as a village in 1912. The village has the name of George Von Chauvin, a railroad official.

== Demographics ==
In the 2021 Census of Population conducted by Statistics Canada, the Village of Chauvin had a population of 304 living in 143 of its 162 total private dwellings, a change of −9.3% from its 2016 population of 335. With a land area of 2.22 km^{2} (0.86 sq mi), it had a population density of 136.9/km^{2} (354.7/sq mi) in 2021.

In the 2016 Census of Population conducted by Statistics Canada, the Village of Chauvin recorded a population of 335 living in 145 of its 156 total private dwellings, a 0.3% change from its 2011 population of 334. With a land area of 2.24 km^{2} (0.86 sq mi), it had a population density of 149.6/km^{2} (387.3/sq mi) in 2016.

The population of the Village of Chauvin according to its 2016 municipal census is 345, a 1.5% change from its 2011 municipal census population of 340.

== See also ==
- List of communities in Alberta
- List of villages in Alberta
