= Kinsella, Alberta =

Kinsella
- Hamlet
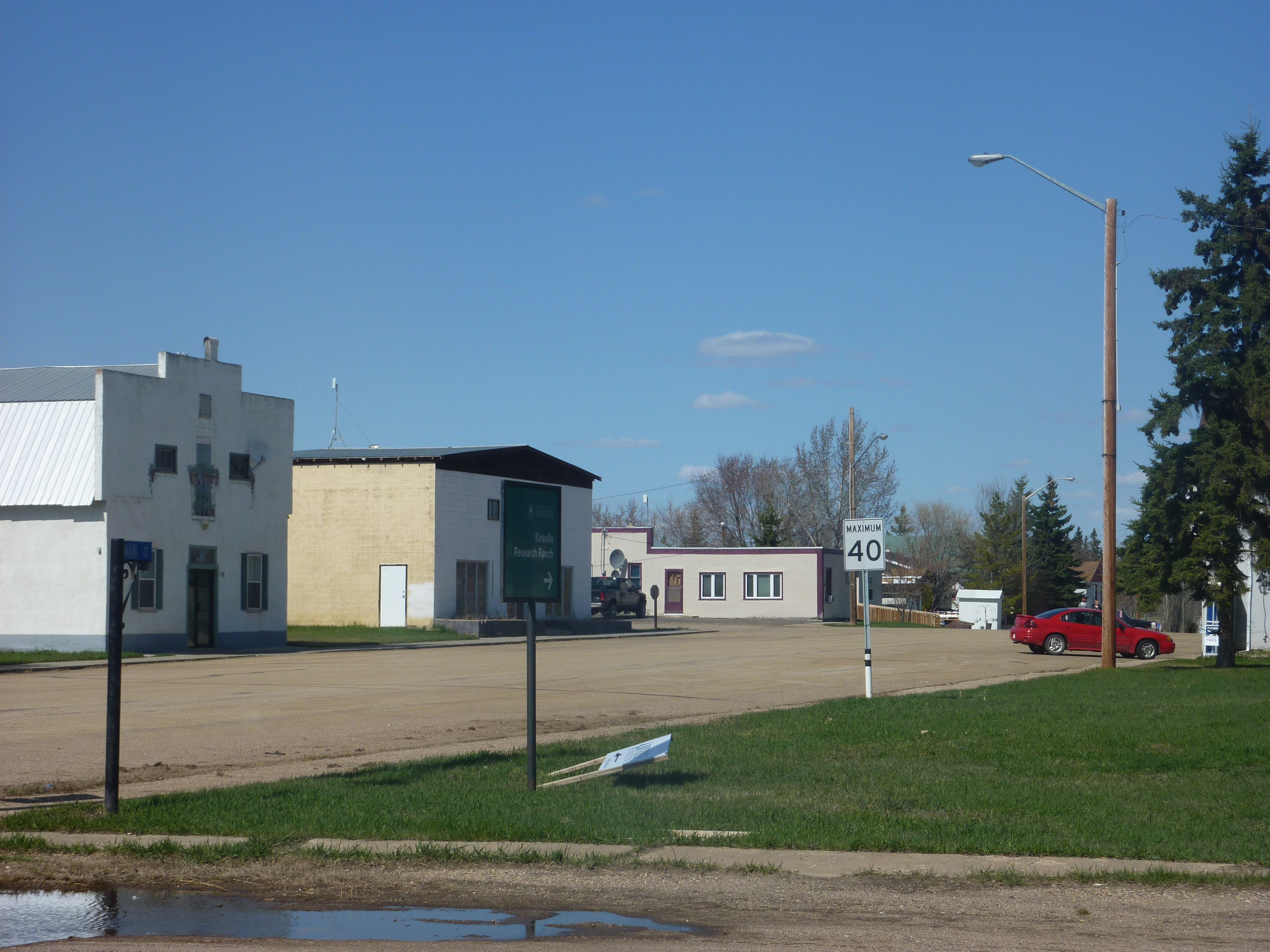

- Location of Kinsella in Alberta
- Coordinates: 53°00′01″N 111°31′26″W
- Country: Canada
- Province: Alberta
- Census division: No. 10
- Municipal district: Beaver County

Government
  - Type: Unincorporated
  - Governing body: Beaver County Council
- Elevation: 695 m (2,280 ft)

Population (2009)
  - Total: 40
- Time zone: UTC−06:00 (Alberta Time)
- Postal code: Postal Code
- Area code: T0B 2N0

Kinsella is a hamlet in Alberta, Canada within Beaver County. It is located along Highway 14 and the CN Railway and has an elevation of 695 metres (2,280 ft).

The hamlet is located in census division No. 10 and in the federal riding of Vegreville-Wainwright.

== Geography ==
=== Climate ===
Climate data for Kinsella
Month	Jan	Feb	Mar	Apr	May	Jun	Jul	Aug	Sep	Oct	Nov	Dec	Year
Record high °C (°F)	11.1 (52.0)	12.5 (54.5)	18.9 (66.0)	30.6 (87.1)	33.5 (92.3)	33.9 (93.0)	35.6 (96.1)	37 (99)	34.5 (94.1)	28.5 (83.3)	20.6 (69.1)	13.5 (56.3)	37 (99)
Mean daily maximum °C (°F)	−9.2 (15.4)	−5.2 (22.6)	0.1 (32.2)	10.5 (50.9)	17.3 (63.1)	20.8 (69.4)	22.5 (72.5)	22.5 (72.5)	16.6 (61.9)	10.1 (50.2)	−1.6 (29.1)	−7.1 (19.2)	8.1 (46.6)
Mean daily minimum °C (°F)	−18.4 (−1.1)	−15 (5)	−9.4 (15.1)	−1.3 (29.7)	4.5 (40.1)	8.7 (47.7)	10.7 (51.3)	9.6 (49.3)	4.5 (40.1)	−1.1 (30.0)	−10 (14)	−16.1 (3.0)	−2.8 (27.0)
Record low °C (°F)	−46.1 (−51.0)	−45.6 (−50.1)	−37.8 (−36.0)	−26.1 (−15.0)	−7 (19)	−2.8 (27.0)	2.2 (36.0)	−2 (28)	−8.3 (17.1)	−23 (−9)	−33.5 (−28.3)	−45 (−49)	−46.1 (−51.0)
Average precipitation mm (inches)	22.7 (0.89)	12.7 (0.50)	20.9 (0.82)	24 (0.9)	43.7 (1.72)	82.9 (3.26)	73.8 (2.91)	58.6 (2.31)	35.2 (1.39)	17.1 (0.67)	18.2 (0.72)	21.5 (0.85)	431.2 (16.98)
Source: Environment Canada

== Demographics ==
Population history of Kinsella
Year	Pop.	±%
1941	97	—
1951	121	+24.7%
1956	103	−14.9%
1961	91	−11.7%
1966	83	−8.8%
1971	81	−2.4%
1976	68	−16.0%
1981	65	−4.4%
1986	54	−16.9%
1991	50	−7.4%
Source: Statistics Canada

The population of Kinsella according to the 2009 municipal census conducted by Beaver County is 40.

== Research Station ==
The Roy Berg Kinsella Research Station is located directly northwest of the community. Founded in 1960, it is run by the University of Alberta. It covers a total area of 4,856 hectares (12,000 acres).

== See also ==
- List of communities in Alberta
- List of hamlets in Alberta
