= Irma, Alberta =

Irma
- Village
- Village of Irma
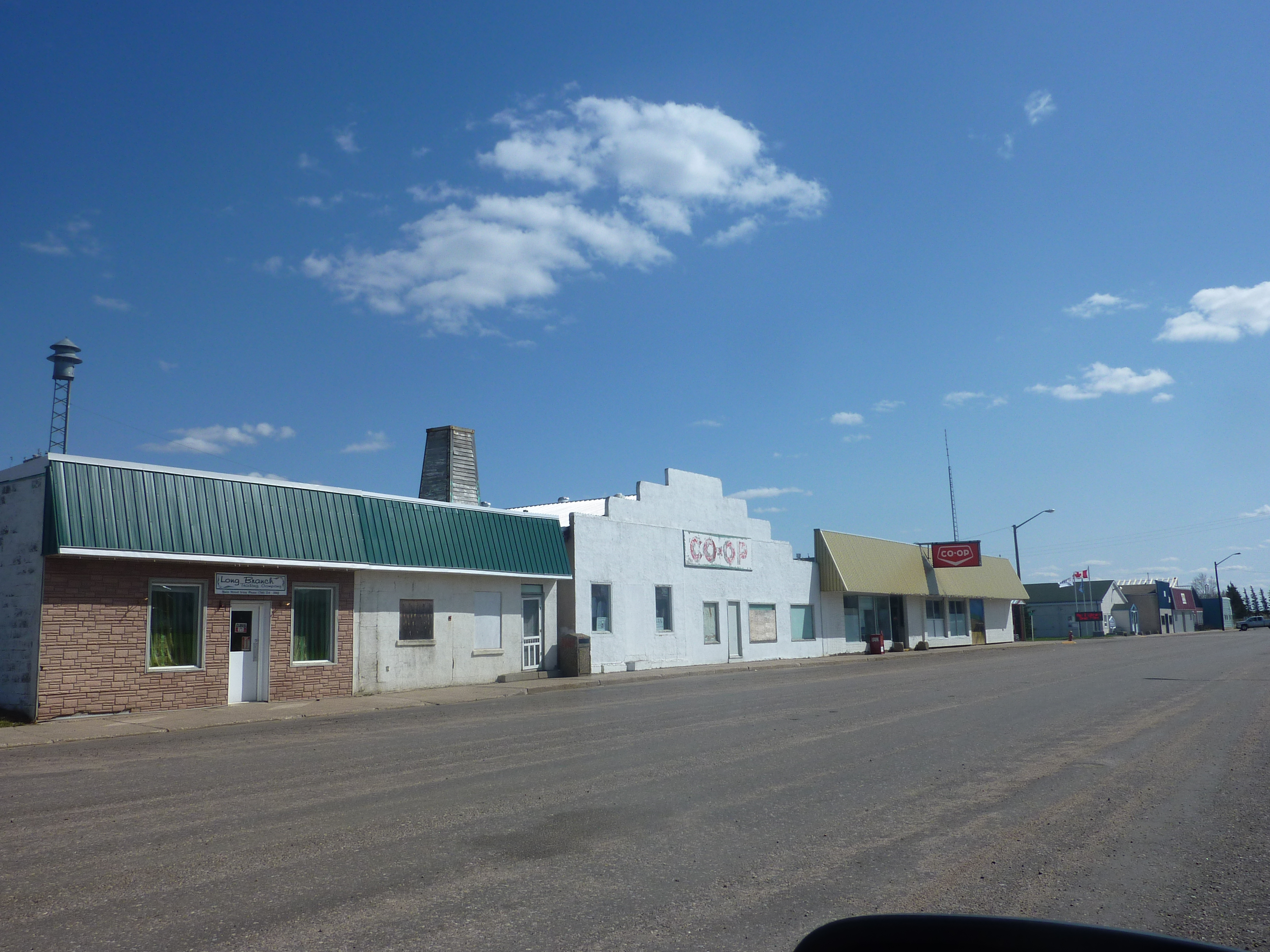
- Main Street

- Location within Alberta
- Coordinates: 52°54′49″N 111°13′49″W
- Country: Canada
- Province: Alberta
- Region: Central Alberta
- Census Division: No. 7
- Municipal district: Municipal District of Wainwright No. 61
- Founded: 1908
- Incorporated
  - Village: May 30, 1912

Government
  - Mayor: Mervin Firkus
  - Governing body: Irma Village Council

Area (2021)
  - Land: 1.32 km^{2} (0.51 sq mi)
- Elevation: 690 m (2,260 ft)

Population (2021)
  - Total: 477
  - Density: 361.7/km^{2} (937/sq mi)
- Time zone: UTC−06:00 (Alberta Time)
- Highways: 14; 881
- Website: Official website

Irma is a village in central Alberta, Canada. It is located 29 kilometres (18 mi) northwest of Wainwright and 178 kilometres (111 mi) southeast of Edmonton along Highway 14 and Highway 881.

== History ==
The Village of Irma came into being in 1908 when the Grand Trunk Pacific Railway came through. Irma was later incorporated as a Village on May 30, 1912. The village was supposedly named after the daughter of the GTPR second vice-president General William Wainwright. Records show three major fires in the downtown area. These broke out in 1911, 1931 and 1963. Most of the buildings on the main street (now 50 Street) were reconstructed after the 1931 fire. Alberta's first rural high school was located in Irma; it was eventually replaced and the new school opened on November 4, 2019.

== Demographics ==
In the 2021 Census of Population conducted by Statistics Canada, the Village of Irma had a population of 477 living in 207 of its 240 total private dwellings, a change of −8.4% from its 2016 population of 521. With a land area of 1.32 km^{2} (0.51 sq mi), it had a population density of 361.4/km^{2} (935.9/sq mi) in 2021.

In the 2016 Census of Population conducted by Statistics Canada, the Village of Irma recorded a population of 521 living in 221 of its 242 total private dwellings, a 14% change from its 2011 population of 457. With a land area of 1.34 km^{2} (0.52 sq mi), it had a population density of 388.8/km^{2} (1,007.0/sq mi) in 2016.

== Notable people ==
- Jagger Firkus (born 2004): AHL hockey player under contract with the NHL's Seattle Kraken
- Parker Mackay (born 1994): AHL hockey player
- Gord Mark (born 1964): NHL hockey player
- Jean Paré (1927–2022): cookbook author and publisher
- Carson Soucy (born 1994): NHL hockey player

== See also ==
- List of communities in Alberta
- List of villages in Alberta
