= Municipal District of Wainwright No. 61 =

Municipal district in Alberta, Canada

- Municipal district
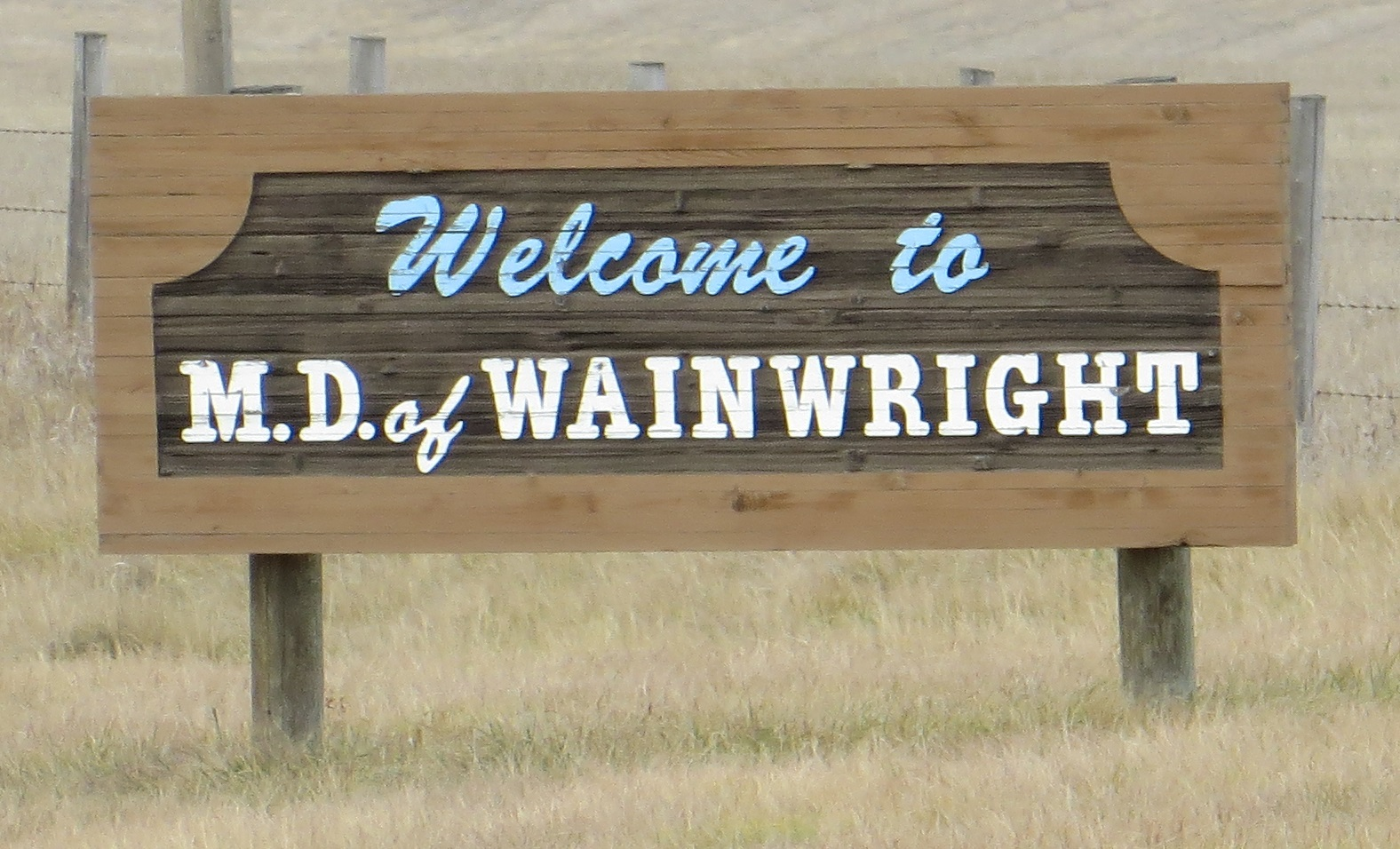
- Welcome sign

- Location within Alberta
- Coordinates: 52°50′36″N 110°51′12″W
- Country: Canada
- Province: Alberta
- Region: Central Alberta
- Census division: 7
- Established: 1942
- Incorporated: 1942

Government
  - Reeve: Bob Barss
  - Governing body: MD of Wainwright Council
  - Administrative office: Wainwright

Area (2021)
  - Land: 4,095.29 km^{2} (1,581.20 sq mi)

Population (2021)
  - Total: 4,446
- Time zone: UTC−06:00 (Alberta Time)
- Website: mdwainwright.ca

The Municipal District of Wainwright No. 61 is a municipal district (MD) in eastern Alberta, Canada. Located in Census Division No. 7, its municipal office is located in the Town of Wainwright. The municipal district is bisected north-south by the Buffalo Trail and east-west by the Poundmaker Trail.

== Geography ==
=== Communities and localities ===
The following urban municipalities are surrounded by the MD of Wainwright No. 61.

Cities

- none

Towns

- Wainwright

Villages

- Chauvin
- Edgerton
- Irma

Summer villages

- none

The following hamlets are located within the MD of Wainwright No. 61.

Hamlets

- Fabyan
- Greenshields
- Ribstone

The following localities are located within the MD of Wainwright No. 61.

Localities

- Ascot Heights
- Bushy Head Corner
- Butze
- Denwood
- Dunn
- Gilt Edge
- Hawkins
- Heath
- Hope Valley
- Jarrow
- Killarney Lake
- Park Farm
- Prospect Valley
- Rocky Ford
- Roros
- Saville Farm

== Demographics ==
In the 2021 Census of Population conducted by Statistics Canada, the MD of Wainwright No. 61 had a population of 4,446 living in 1,499 of its 1,852 total private dwellings, a change of −0.4% from its 2016 population of 4,464. With a land area of 4,095.29 km^{2} (1,581.20 sq mi), it had a population density of 1.1/km^{2} (2.8/sq mi) in 2021.

In the 2016 Census of Population conducted by Statistics Canada, the MD of Wainwright No. 61 had a population of 4,479 living in 1,459 of its 1,768 total private dwellings, a change of 8.2% from its 2011 population of 4,138. With a land area of 4,156.56 km^{2} (1,604.86 sq mi), it had a population density of 1.1/km^{2} (2.8/sq mi) in 2016.

== See also ==
- List of communities in Alberta
- List of francophone communities in Alberta
- List of municipal districts in Alberta
