= Biggar station =

Railway station in Biggar, Saskatchewan, Canada

Biggar
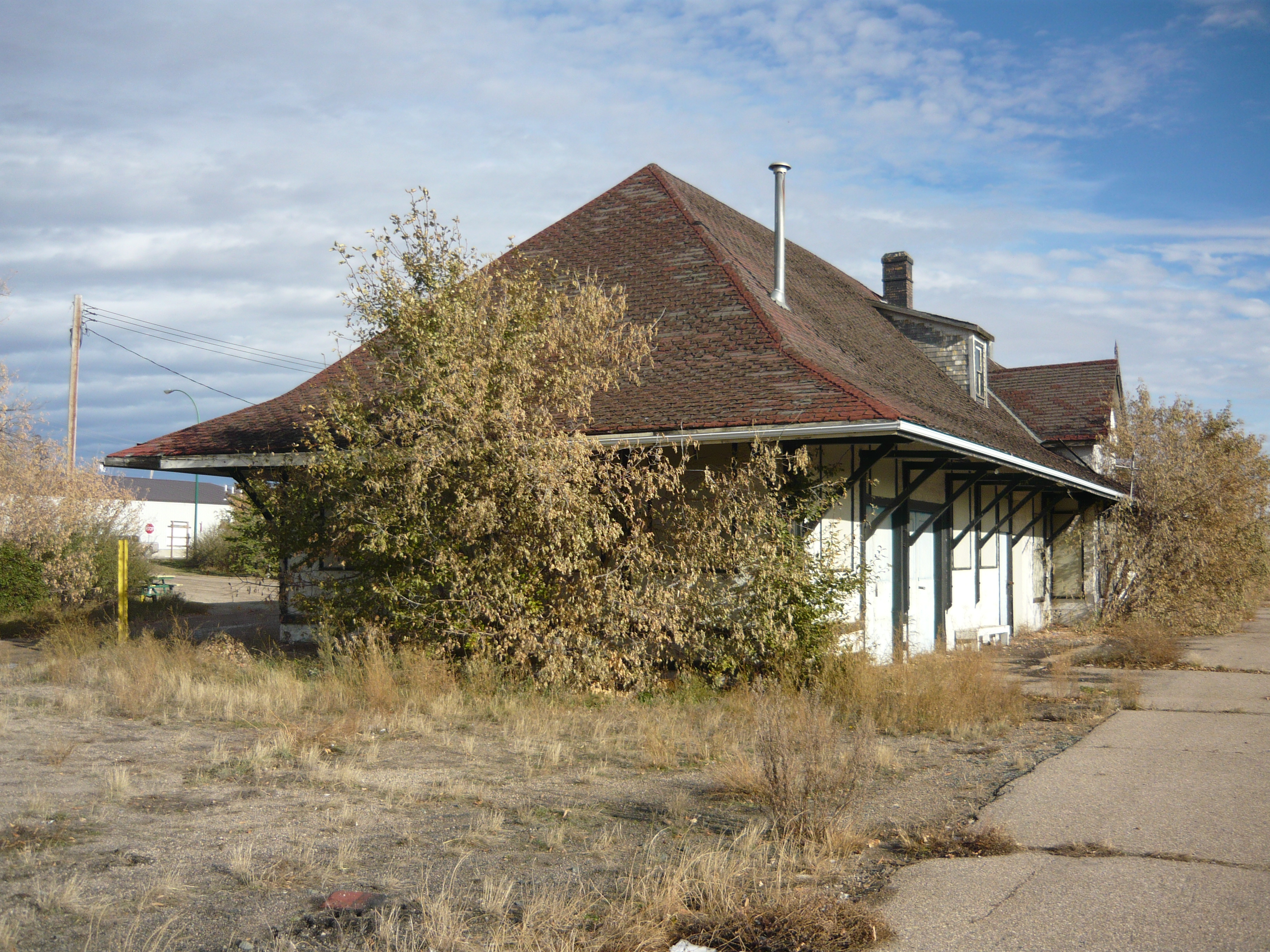

General information
- Location: Main Street and 1 Avenue, Biggar, Saskatchewan; Canada
- Coordinates: 52°3′13″N 107°59′11″W
- Platforms: 1 side platform
- Tracks: 1

Construction
- Structure type: Sign post
- Parking: yes

History
- Opened: 1910
- Former names: Grand Trunk Pacific Railway

Services
Preceding station	Via Rail	Following station
Unity toward Vancouver	The Canadian	Saskatoon toward Toronto

Former services
Preceding station	Canadian National Railway	Following station
Oban toward Vancouver	Main Line	Cazalet toward Montreal
Oban toward Carruthers	Carruthers – Biggar	Terminus

National Historic Site of Canada
- Designated: 1976
Location

The Biggar station was a heritage railway station in Biggar, Saskatchewan, Canada. It was built by the Grand Trunk Pacific Railway in 1909 and demolished in 2018. Via Rail's Canadian transcontinental passenger train service stops at the site of the former station.

== History ==
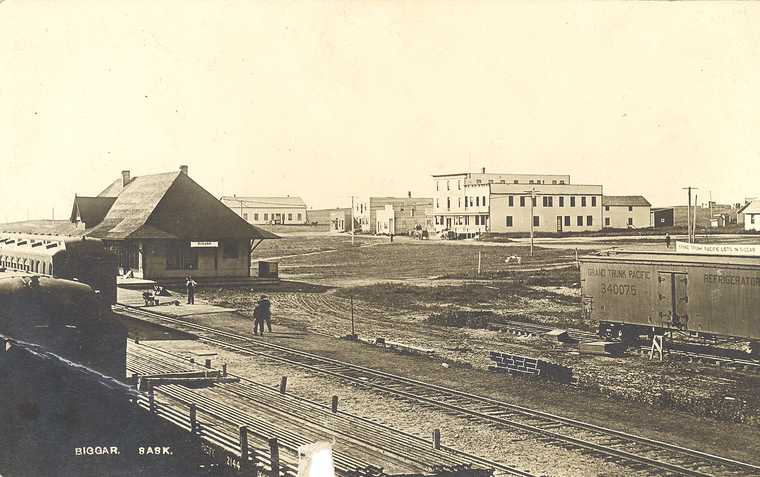
View of the station, circa 1900-1909

Biggar received its first railway service in 1907 when the Canadian Pacific Railway (CPR) built a branch line through the area. The Grand Trunk Pacific Railway (GTP) transcontinental railway project was built through Biggar the following year in 1908 and the GTP designated the town as a division point on the main line between the railway's eastern terminus at Winnipeg, Manitoba, and the railway's western terminus at Prince Rupert, British Columbia.

The town was named in honour of William Hodgins Biggar, who was the railway company's General Counsel.

The station building was constructed by the GTP in 1909 and opened in 1910. It was one of the largest GTP stations in western Canada and featured a 24-hour-per-day restaurant for passengers and railway employees.

In 1920, the bankrupt GTP system was nationalized by the Government of Canada and it was merged into the Canadian National Railways (CNR), a federal Crown corporation. Under CNR, later shortened to CN or CN Rail, the Biggar Railway Station saw continued use as a station stop for that company's premier transcontinental passenger train, the Super Continental.

In 1978, CN transferred its passenger railway service to Via Rail, a new federal Crown corporation dedicated exclusively to operating Canada's passenger trains. In 1981, Via Rail budget cuts saw the Super Continental discontinued, thus Biggar lost its passenger service, however this returned in 1985 when the Via Rail budget cuts to the Super Continental were reversed.

In 1990, further budget cuts to Via Rail saw the Super Continental cut once again; however, the Canadian which had run on the Canadian Pacific Railway in southern Saskatchewan from Winnipeg via Regina to Calgary, Alberta, and on to Vancouver, British Columbia, was shifted to the more northerly CN line running through Biggar.

In 1976, the station was designated a National Historic Site of Canada as a recognition of the Grand Trunk Pacific Railway's role in the development of Western Canada and the distinctive contribution its stations made to Canada's architectural heritage. On February 19, 1996, Sheila Copps, Deputy Prime Minister and Minister of Canadian Heritage further designated the Biggar Railway Station as a Heritage Railway Station, which resulted in legislative protection to prevent demolition or alteration.

The citation reads as follows:

Planned at the beginning of the 20th century as a transcontinental line to rival the Canadian Pacific, the Grand Trunk Pacific was beset by managerial and financial troubles which prevented its profitable operation and it became part of the Canadian National Railways in 1920. The railway played a significant role in the development of the western provinces and many settlements such as Biggar, grew up from stations along the line. Its station buildings, like the Biggar example, remain a distinctive contribution to Canada's architectural heritage.

— Historic Sites and Monuments Board of Canada

The building was built of wood in a bungalow style, typical of small town railway stations built by the Grand Trunk Pacific during that period.

== Current use ==
The Biggar Railway Station is a station stop used by Via Rail's Canadian transcontinental passenger train service.

Biggar is the first stop for the westbound Canadian after departing Saskatoon 1 hour earlier to the east. Edmonton is approximately 5 hours by train to the west.

Biggar was a division point for Canadian National Railway (CN) in its freight service, which closed in April 2014.

Although the actual station is too run-down to enter, 2 smaller heated waiting sheds are also there for passenger use. However, it has now been slated for demolition (originally on July 25, 2014, then July 31, and now by the end of October). In 2018 the federal government granted approval for demolition.

The station was demolished in July 2018.
