= Biggar, Saskatchewan =

Town in Saskatchewan, Canada

Biggar
- Town
- Town of Biggar
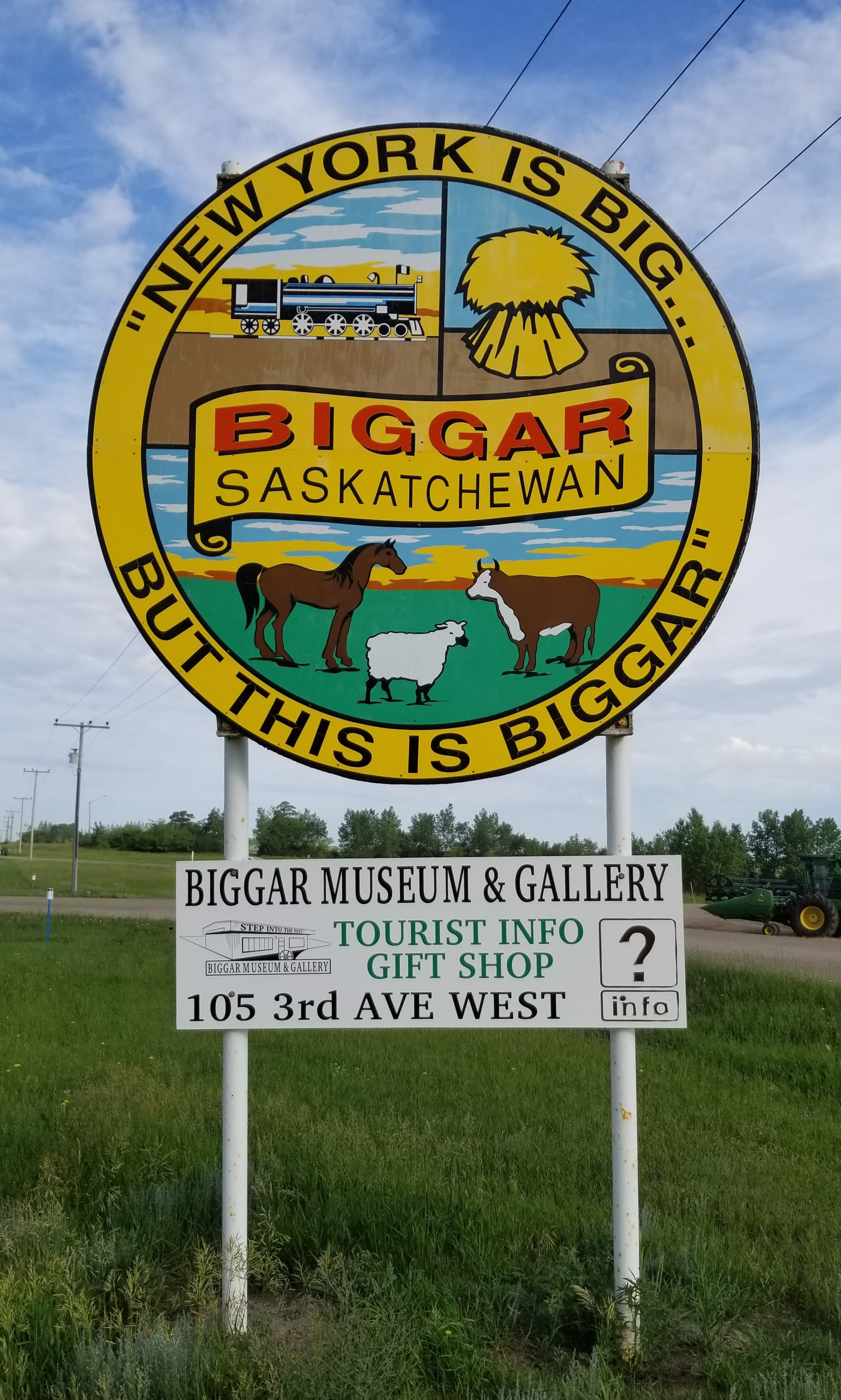
- Biggar town limit sign
- Motto: "New York is big, but this is Biggar."
- Location within Saskatchewan Location within Biggar No. 347
- Coordinates: 52°03′32″N 107°58′44″W
- Country: Canada
- Province: Saskatchewan
- Census division: 12
- Rural municipality: Biggar No. 347
- Founded: 1907
- Incorporated (village): 1909
- Incorporated (town): 1911
- Founder: Grand Trunk Pacific Railway
- Named for: William Hodgins Biggar

Government
  - Mayor: Jim Rickwood
  - Town Manager: Marty Baroni
  - Governing body: Biggar Town Council
  - MLA (Biggar-Sask Valley): Kim Gartner (SKP)
  - MP (Swift Current—Grasslands—Kindersley): Jeremy Patzer (CON)

Area
  - Total: 15.75 km^{2} (6.08 sq mi)

Population (2011)
  - Total: 2,161
  - Density: 137.2/km^{2} (355/sq mi)
- Time zone: UTC−6 (CST)
- Postal code: S0K 0M0
- Area codes: 306, 633
- Highways: Highway 4 Highway 14; Highway 51
- Website: townofbiggar.com

Biggar is a town in central Saskatchewan, Canada. It is on Highway 14 and Highway 4, 93 kilometres (58 mi) west of Saskatoon.

Biggar has become well known for its unusual town slogan, an Olympic athlete, and a world-record deer. The town was featured on American morning newsmagazine The Today Show in February 2010 as part of an ongoing Canadian-oriented segment during the 2010 Winter Olympics.

== History ==
Biggar was incorporated as a village in 1909. It was named after William Hodgins Biggar, general counsel of the Grand Trunk Pacific Railway (GTP), which had come through the area in 1908. Prior to that, the major means of transportation was via the nearby Swift Current–Battleford Trail. The GTP made Biggar a divisional point on its line, building a large station and roundhouse. The population grew as Biggar became a home terminal where train crews were changed.

In 1911 Biggar was incorporated as a town. Settlement continued and the population increased to greater than 2,000 by the mid-1920s, peaking at 2,755 in 1966. According to the 2011 census, Biggar is now home to 2,161 people.

The town is known for its slogan "New York is big, but this is Biggar." It was created in 1914 by a survey crew who painted it onto a town sign as a drunken prank. According to The Biggar Museum and Gallery, the graffiti remained unchanged until 1954 when the slogan was officially adopted.

The world-record typical white-tailed deer was harvested near Biggar in 1993 by Milo Hanson. The Boone and Crockett Club scored the buck at 213 5/8.

== Demographics ==
In the 2021 Census of Population conducted by Statistics Canada, Biggar had a population of 2,133 living in 941 of its 1,027 total private dwellings, a change of −4.2% from its 2016 population of 2,226. With a land area of 15.37 km^{2} (5.93 sq mi), it had a population density of 138.8/km^{2} (359.4/sq mi) in 2021.

Canada census – Biggar community profile

	2021	2016	2011
Population	2,133 (-4.2% from 2016)	2,226 (3.0% from 2011)	2,161 (6.3% from 2006)
Land area	15.37 km^{2} (5.93 sq mi)	15.75 km^{2} (6.08 sq mi)	15.75 km^{2} (6.08 sq mi)
Population density	138.8/km^{2} (359/sq mi)	141.4/km^{2} (366/sq mi)	137.2/km^{2} (355/sq mi)
Median age	45.6 (M: 44.0, F: 47.2)	45.2 (M: 43.3, F: 47.4)	46.7 (M: 45.4, F: 48.0)
Private dwellings	1,027 (total) 941 (occupied)	1,082 (total)	1,032 (total)
Median household income	$73,000	$63,168	$N/A

References: 2021 2016 2011

== Economy ==
The Biggar railway station was constructed in 1909–1910 and is serviced by Via Rail, with The Canadian serving the station four times a week (twice going east, twice going west). Biggar's prosperity was directly tied to the railway for many years. Up to 500 local people were at one time employed by Canadian National Railway (CN), which took over the GTP. That number has now dropped to under 200. As the railway industry has decreased, Biggar has shifted its economy to agriculture and related industries.

Biggar is home to Prairie Malt Limited, a large barley processing plant. The malthouse has an annual capacity of 220,000 metric tonnes. Malt is a primary ingredient in beer and whisky. Prairie Malt employs approximately 70 full-time employees. It creates significant spin-off employment among local trucking firms such as Biggar Transport, with a fleet of over 50 trucks.

As of 2010, the town of Biggar listed more than 150 businesses and services on its website. These included a manufacturer of petroleum and hazardous material containment tanks, a sodium sulphate plant, a large greenhouse and a variety of financial, farm and health services.

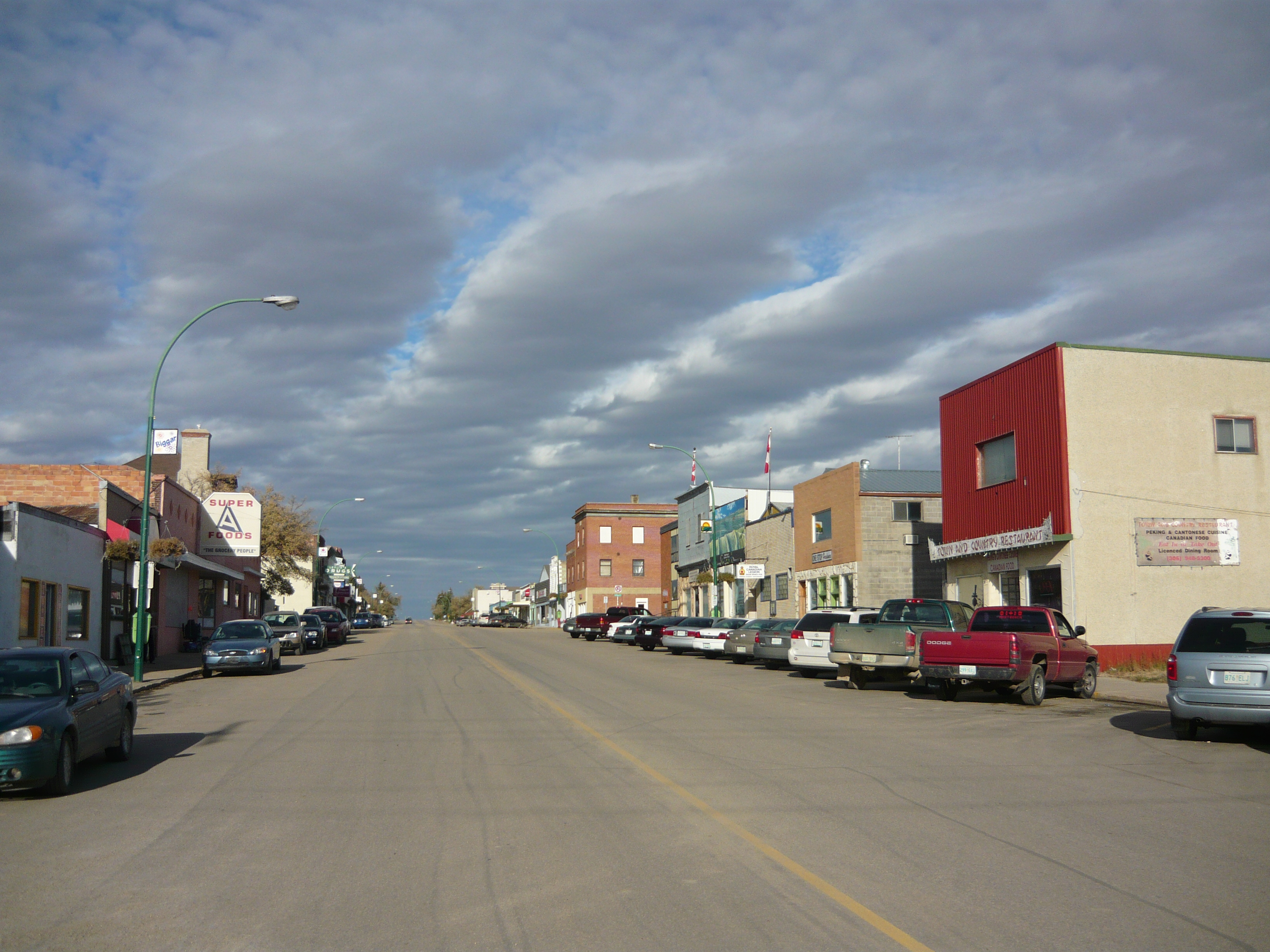
Biggar Main Street

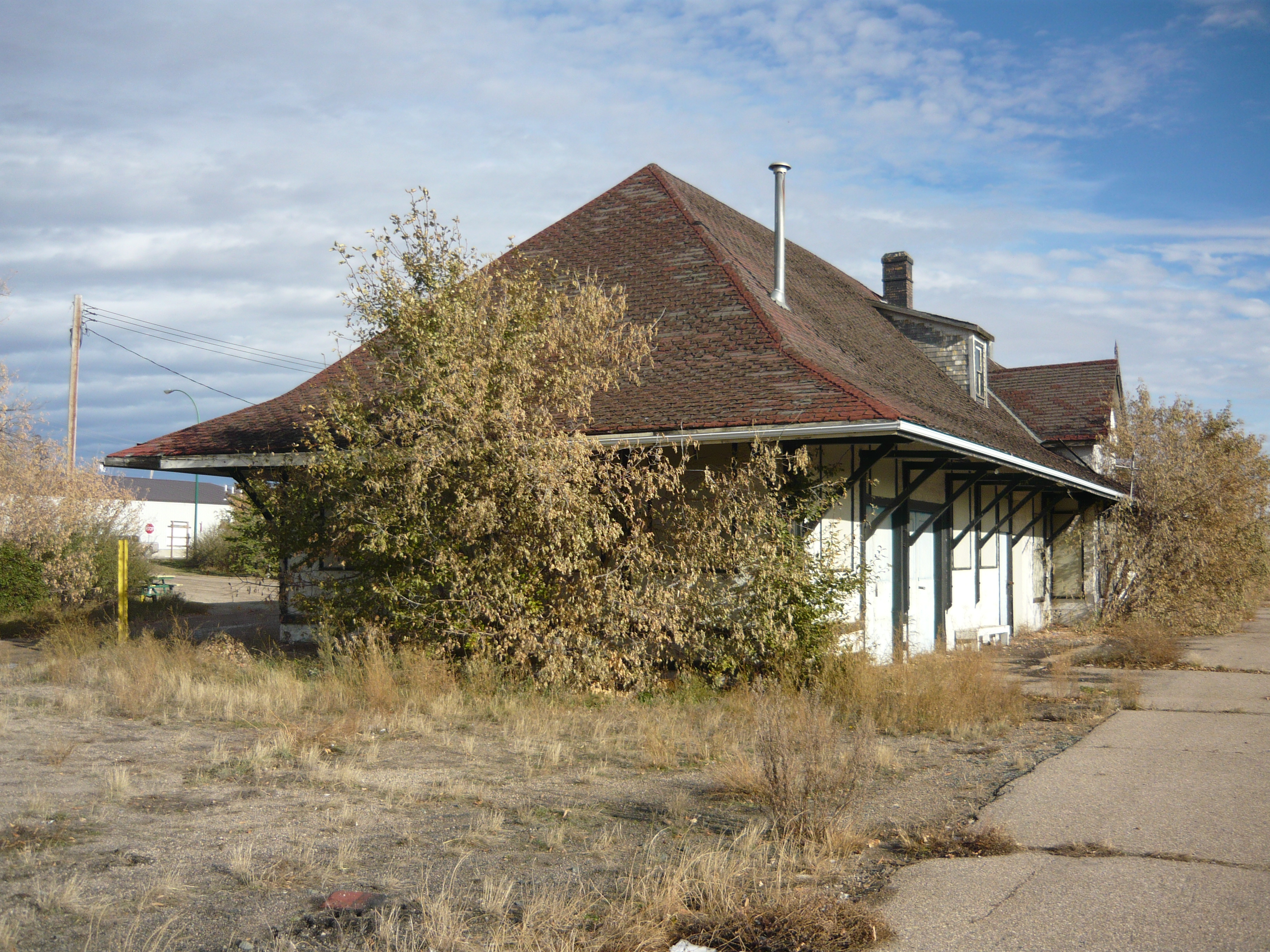
Biggar railway station (1909–1910) National Historic Site

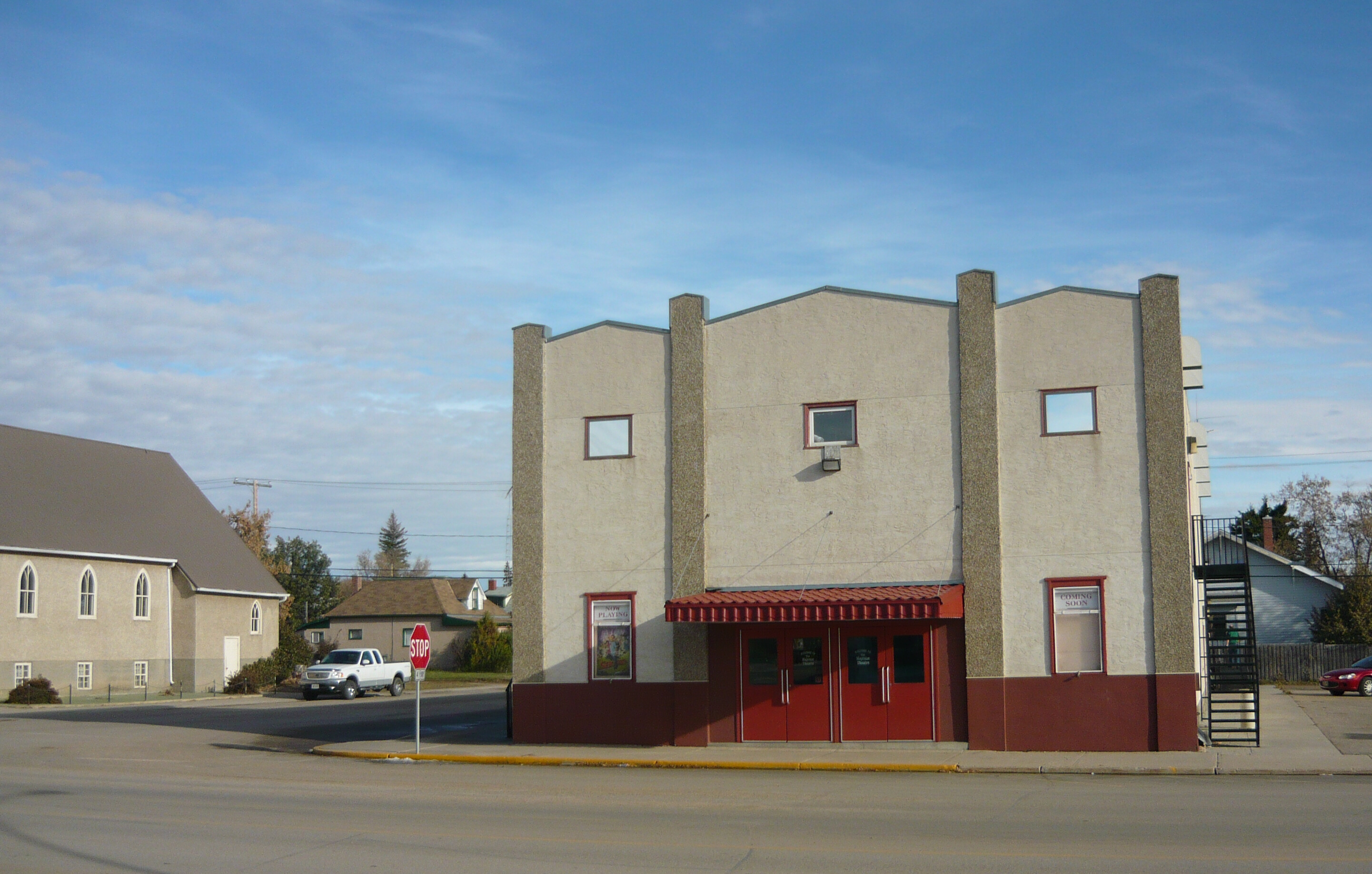
Majestic Theatre

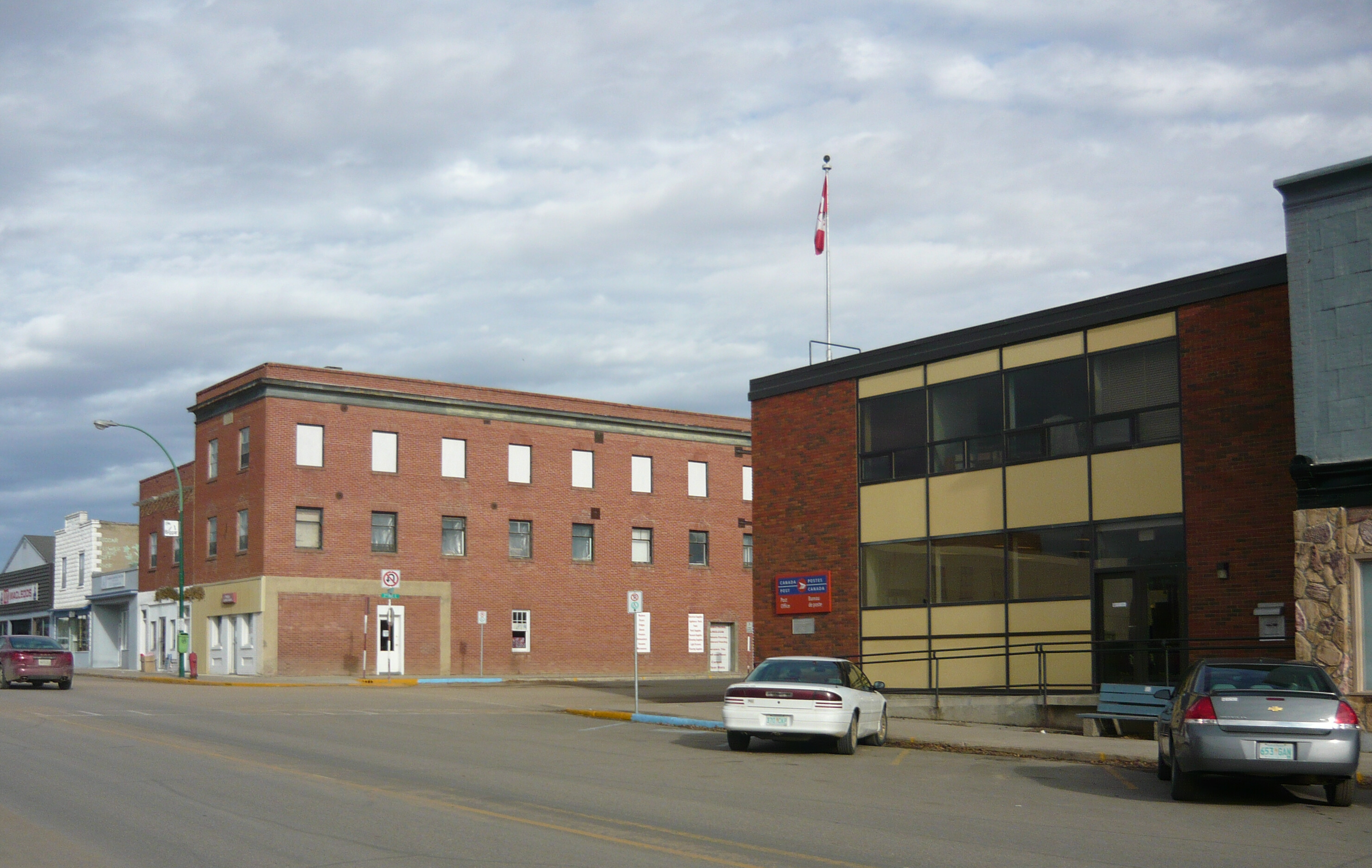
Eamon Block (1911) and Post Office

== Education ==
Two school divisions operate in Biggar.

Current schools

The public school is Biggar Central 2000, a kindergarten to grade twelve school a part of Sun West School Division. Greater Saskatoon Catholic Schools operates St. Gabriel School, a Catholic kindergarten to grade nine school.

Great Plains College offers post-secondary certificates and diplomas in nursing, emergency medical technician, electrician and truck driving.

Former schools

- Biggar's original classroom was on the second floor of the Biggar Hotel (2 Jan 1910 – May 1910) while Biggar Public School was being built.
- Biggar Public School was built in 1910, and was demolished in 1962.
- Thornton School was built in 1924, demolished in 1972.

== Parks and recreation ==
Biggar has several recreational facilities and parks in and around town. There is an ice rink, curling rink, ball diamonds, and aquatic centre. About one kilometre north of town is Biggar & District Regional Park, which has a campground and golf course.

== Notable people ==
- Coldwell, James (Major) — Biggar elected Major James Coldwell, the leader of the Co-operative Commonwealth Federation, as their Member of Parliament from 1935 to 1958. He was noted as the person that fought for and won old-age pensions, as well as other social democratic reforms in both the William Lyon Mackenzie-King and Louis St. Laurent governments.
- Schmirler, Sandra – Biggar is the hometown of Sandra Schmirler, a 1998 Olympic gold medalist and three-time world champion in women's curling. Schmirler died in 2000 at the age of 36 of cancer. Her funeral was broadcast nationally by CBC Television and TSN, a first for a Canadian athlete. Biggar honoured Schmirler's contributions to sport and her hometown by constructing the Sandra Schmirler Olympic Gold Park, which houses a gazebo, playground, memorial and wall of fame.
- Weekes, Randall (Randy) Percival – Canadian politician. Member of the Saskatchewan Legislative Assembly (1999 – ) Born in Biggar (1956).

== Government ==
Biggar's current mayor is Jim Rickwood. The town of Biggar is within the Rural Municipality of Biggar No. 347. Provincially, Biggar is represented by MLA Randy Weekes of the Saskatchewan Party. Federally the town is within the riding of Carlton Trail-Eagle Creek, whose current MP is Kelly Block of the Conservative Party of Canada.

== Climate ==
Biggar experiences a humid continental (Köppen climate classification Dfb).

The highest temperature ever recorded in Biggar was 40.0 °C (104 °F) on 4 July 1937, 24 June 1941, and 6 August 1949. The coldest temperature ever recorded was −46.7 °C (−52 °F) on 16 February 1936.

Climate data for Biggar (1981–2010)
Month	Jan	Feb	Mar	Apr	May	Jun	Jul	Aug	Sep	Oct	Nov	Dec	Year
Record high °C (°F)	15.6 (60.1)	15.0 (59.0)	24.5 (76.1)	32.8 (91.0)	36.7 (98.1)	40.0 (104.0)	40.0 (104.0)	40.0 (104.0)	36.7 (98.1)	34.4 (93.9)	21.7 (71.1)	15.0 (59.0)	40.0 (104.0)
Mean daily maximum °C (°F)	−10.1 (13.8)	−6.4 (20.5)	0.4 (32.7)	10.9 (51.6)	18.0 (64.4)	22.2 (72.0)	25.1 (77.2)	24.8 (76.6)	17.9 (64.2)	10.0 (50.0)	−1.7 (28.9)	−8 (18)	8.6 (47.5)
Daily mean °C (°F)	−14.8 (5.4)	−11.4 (11.5)	−4.7 (23.5)	4.6 (40.3)	11.2 (52.2)	15.7 (60.3)	18.4 (65.1)	17.8 (64.0)	11.5 (52.7)	4.2 (39.6)	−5.9 (21.4)	−12.6 (9.3)	2.8 (37.0)
Mean daily minimum °C (°F)	−19.5 (−3.1)	−16.4 (2.5)	−9.8 (14.4)	−1.8 (28.8)	4.3 (39.7)	9.2 (48.6)	11.7 (53.1)	10.9 (51.6)	5.0 (41.0)	−1.6 (29.1)	−10.1 (13.8)	−17.1 (1.2)	−2.9 (26.8)
Record low °C (°F)	−45.6 (−50.1)	−46.7 (−52.1)	−37.2 (−35.0)	−31.7 (−25.1)	−11.1 (12.0)	−3.9 (25.0)	0.0 (32.0)	−3.3 (26.1)	−9.4 (15.1)	−25 (−13)	−34 (−29)	−42.5 (−44.5)	−46.7 (−52.1)
Average precipitation mm (inches)	19.2 (0.76)	9.6 (0.38)	15.7 (0.62)	24.8 (0.98)	44.0 (1.73)	58.6 (2.31)	67.1 (2.64)	48.7 (1.92)	37.1 (1.46)	18.5 (0.73)	15.3 (0.60)	17.7 (0.70)	376.3 (14.81)
Source: Environment Canada

== See also ==
- List of communities in Saskatchewan
- List of towns in Saskatchewan
- Killing of Colten Boushie
