= Alberta Highway 29 =

Highway in Alberta

Highway 29

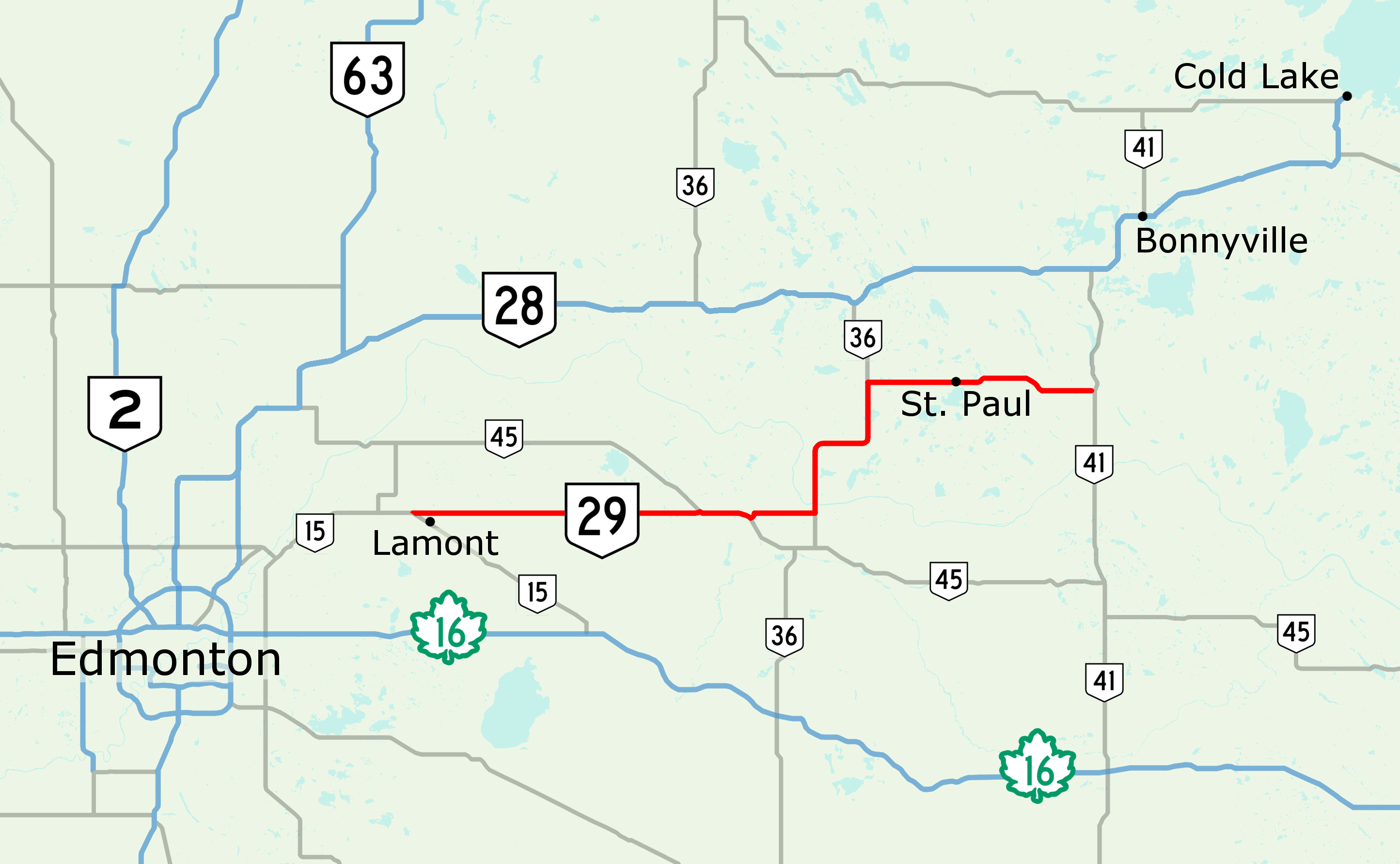
- Highway 29 highlighted in red

Route information
- Maintained by Alberta Transportation
- Length: 152.7 km (94.9 mi)
- Existed: October 2006–present

Major junctions
- West end: Highway 15 near Lamont
- Highway 45 near Hairy Hill; Highway 36 near Duvernay; Highway 646 near Foisy; Highway 36 in St. Brides; Highway 881 in St. Paul
- East end: Highway 41 north of Elk Point

Location
- Country: Canada
- Province: Alberta
- Specialized and rural municipalities: Lamont, Two Hills, St. Paul
- Towns: Lamont, St. Paul

Highway system
- Alberta Provincial Highway Network; List; Former
← Highway 28A	→ Highway 31

Highway 29 is a 153-kilometre (95 mi) highway in east–central Alberta, Canada that connects Highway 15 near Lamont to Highway 41 north of Elk Point. It runs mostly west to east across aspen parkland through Hairy Hill, turning north through Duvernay, Brosseau, Foisy, St. Brides, and east to St. Paul before ending at Highway 41 approximately 9 km (5.6 mi) north of Elk Point, concurrent with Highways 36 and 45 for lengthy sections.

The route was established in 2006 when Alberta Transportation renumbered portions of Highways 637, 45, 860, 36, and 28 between Highways 15 and 41, forming a more coherent route between St. Paul and Edmonton that involved only two numbered highways.

== Route description ==
Highway 29 in Alberta is a rural two-lane highway with relatively little change in elevation, beginning at approximately 2,100 ft (640 m) above mean sea level (AMSL) near Lamont and traversing aspen parkland and agricultural lands of central Alberta. It descends to a low point of 1,760 ft (540 m) AMSL as it crosses the North Saskatchewan River near Brosseasu, ending at 1,950 ft (590 m) AMSL north of Elk Point. It has a posted speed limit of 100 km/h (62 mph) for the vast majority of its length, aside from when it passes through towns such as Brosseau where the limit is reduced to 80 km/h (50 mph), or St. Paul where the limit is 50 km/h (31 mph). There are almost no curves until Duvernay when it changes from an east–west alignment to north–south. Beyond St. Paul, the road becomes slightly more curvaceous and terrain is marginally more wooded near the gradual transition point into the boreal forest of northern Alberta.

The highway begins as a spur from Highway 15, which itself begins in the Edmonton Capital Region and runs northeast into Lamont County where it turns east. Northwest of the town of Lamont, Highway 15 bends southeast and continues onward to Chipman and Mundare. Highway 29 begins at this bend, branching east from Highway 15 and running through the rural farmland of central Alberta toward Saskatchewan. The route first intersects Highway 831, which serves as an alternate route into Lamont from the north. Highway 29 continues east for 29 km (18 mi) to an intersection with Highway 855, which provides access to Andrew and Mundare. Entering Two Hills County, the road meets Highway 45 near Hairy Hill. The two highways continue concurrently east for 10 km (6.2 mi) until, after curving southeast, Highway 29 splits north while Highway 45 continues southeast to Two Hills.

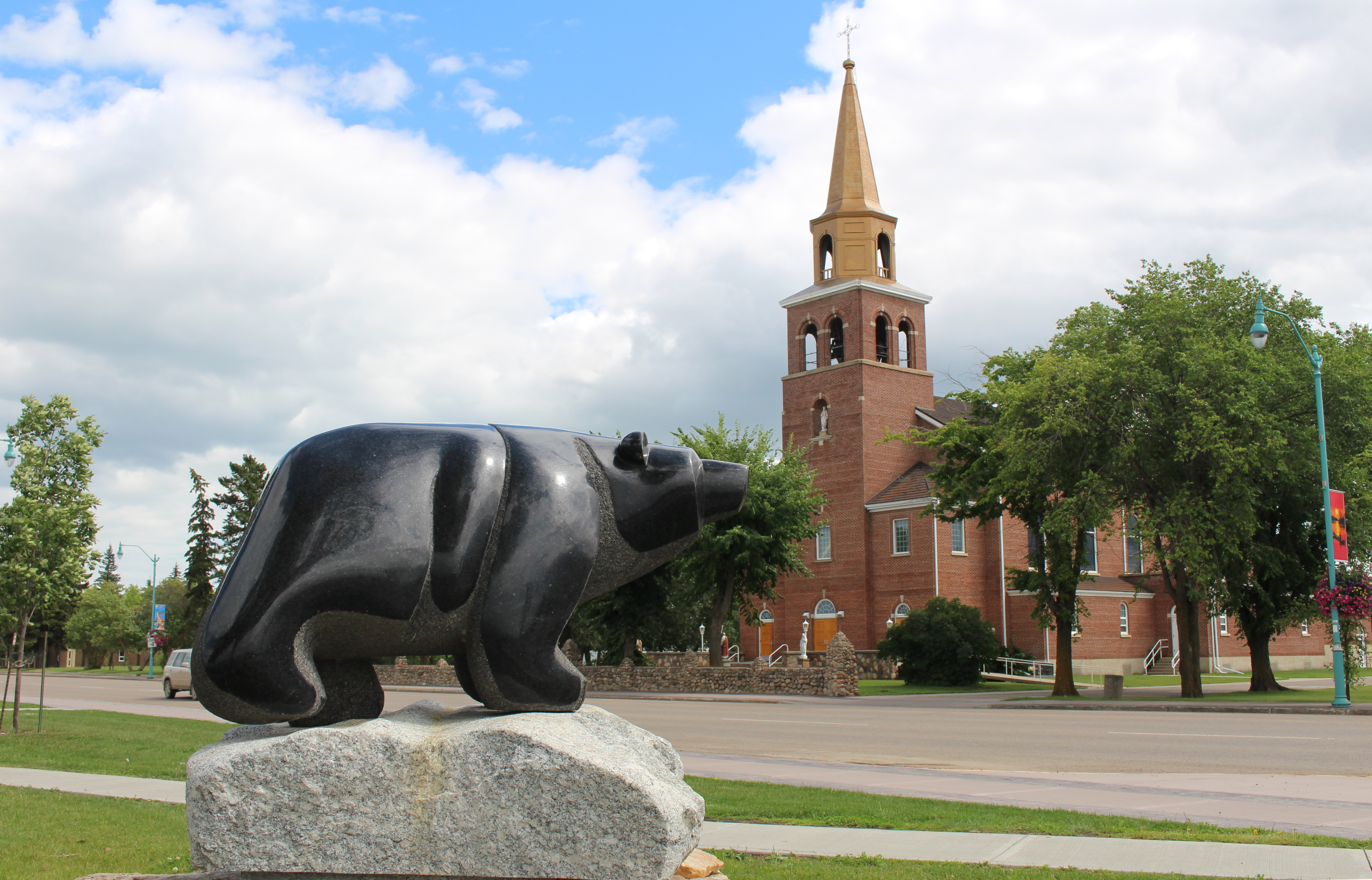
The St. Paul Roman Catholic Cathedral on 50 Avenue (Highway 29) in St. Paul

Following the former alignment of Highway 860 for only 1.3 km, Highway 29 then turns east along Township Road 554 to meet Highway 36 near the hamlet of Duvernay. It and Highway 36 continue concurrently north through Duvernay prior to a crossing of the North Saskatchewan River. The bridge was first built in 1930 and later replaced in 1978. The hamlet of Brosseau lies on the river's north bank, north of which the road passes Lac Brosseau before curving east past Foisy into St. Paul County. The concurrent highways meet Highway 646, which continues east to Lafond and Elk Point. Highways 29 and 36 veer due north, briefly crossing a section of the Saddle Lake Cree Nation before re-entering St. Paul County. Highway 652 branches west to Saddle Lake, and 1.6 km (1 mi) later, the concurrency ends at St. Brides as Highway 29 turns east toward St. Paul from Highway 36 which continues north to Ashmont.

Highway 29 remains in an east–west direction for most of its remaining 44 km (27 mi) in St. Paul County. It passes a series of small lakes and the St. Paul Airport before reaching the town of St. Paul. The speed limit reduces to 70 km/h (43 mph) then 50 km/h (31 mph) as the highway becomes 50 Avenue and widens to four lanes while bisecting the town. Traffic lights control an intersection with Highway 881 at the east end of town. After a brief concurrency, Highway 881 turns south to Myrnam at a second intersection further east, and Highway 29 continues east through St. Paul County. It curves slightly northeast before straightening out to the east and passing the hamlet of St. Edouard, turning southeast across Atimoswe Creek on a culvert. Straightening out due east, the highway ends at a Y intersection with Highway 41 north of Elk Point, 26 km (16 mi) east of St. Paul and 43 km (27 mi) east of the split with Highway 36.

== History ==
Highway 29 was not designated until October 2006, and involved no new construction. It is composed entirely of redesignated highways and concurrencies, with the intention of simplifying the journey from Edmonton to St. Paul which now involves only Highways 15 and 29. The first segment of Highway 29 between Highway 15 near Lamont and Highway 45 northwest of Hairy Hill was formerly Highway 637. A concurrency with Highway 45 precedes a short segment of Highway 860 which was re-signed as Highway 29. The highway turns back east on a segment that was formerly Highway 637. Highway 29 is concurrent with Highway 36 for 33.5 km (21 mi), prior to veering east into St. Paul on the former alignment of Highway 28 to the east end at Highway 41.

== Major intersections ==
Rural/specialized municipality	Location	km	mi	Destinations	Notes
Lamont County		0.0	0.0	Highway 15 – Mundare, Fort Saskatchewan, Edmonton	Highway 29 western terminus; west end of former Highway 637
Lamont County	Lamont	3.4	2.1	Highway 831 – Waskatenau, Boyle	
Lamont County		32.7	20.3	Highway 855 – Andrew, Mundare	
County of Two Hills No. 21		50.7	31.5	Highway 857 – Willingdon, Vegreville	
County of Two Hills No. 21		53.6	33.3	Highway 45 west – Redwater	West end of Highway 45 concurrency
County of Two Hills No. 21		55.7	34.6	UAR 150 south – Hairy Hill	
County of Two Hills No. 21		63.5	39.5	Highway 45 east – Two Hills	East end of Highway 45 concurrency; west end of former Highway 860
County of Two Hills No. 21		64.8	40.3	Highway 860 north	East end of former Highway 860
County of Two Hills No. 21		76.2	47.3	Highway 36 south – Two Hills	South end of Highway 36 concurrency; east end of former Highway 637
County of Two Hills No. 21	Duvernay Brosseau	78.0	48.5	Crosses the North Saskatchewan River (Note: Duvernay is located on the south bank of the North Saskatchewan River and Brosseau is on the north bank.)	
County of St. Paul No. 19		97.7	60.7	Highway 646 east – Lafond, Elk Point	
County of St. Paul No. 19		107.6	66.9	Highway 652 west – Saddle Lake	
County of St. Paul No. 19	St. Brides	109.2	67.9	Highway 36 north – Vilna, Lac La Biche	North end of Highway 36 concurrency; west end of former Highway 28
St. Paul		127.0	78.9	Highway 881 north (40 Street) – St. Vincent, Mallaig, Glendon	West end of Highway 881 concurrency
County of St. Paul No. 19		128.7	80.0	Highway 881 south – Myrnam	East end of Highway 881 concurrency
County of St. Paul No. 19		137.1	85.2	UAR 236 south – St. Edouard	
County of St. Paul No. 19		152.7	94.9	Highway 41 – Cold Lake, Bonnyville, Elk Point, Vermilion	Y intersection; Highway 29 eastern terminus; east end of former Highway 28
1.000 mi = 1.609 km; 1.000 km = 0.621 mi: Concurrency terminus
