= Alberta Highway 881 =

Highway in Alberta

Highway 881

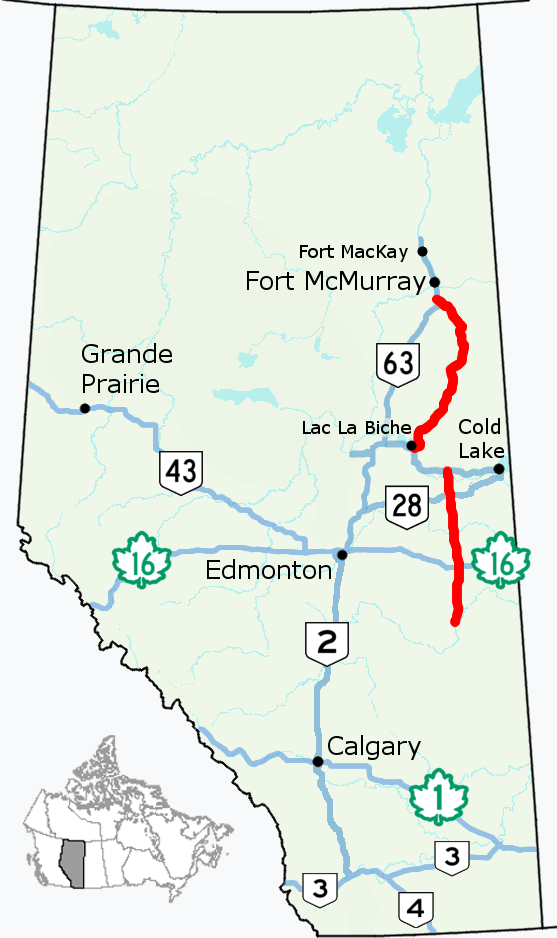
- The two segments of Highway 881 (highlighted in red) are connected by Highway 55

Route information
- Maintained by Alberta Transportation

South segment
- Length: 213.8 km (132.8 mi)
- South end: Highway 13 at Hardisty
- Major intersections: Highway 14 at Irma; Highway 16 (TCH) at Mannville; Highway 45 at Myrnam; Highway 29 at St. Paul; Highway 28 near St. Vincent
- North end: Highway 55 east of Rich Lake

North segment
- Length: 264.9 km (164.6 mi)
- South end: Highway 36 / Highway 55 at Lac La Biche
- North end: Highway 63 south of Fort McMurray

Location
- Country: Canada
- Province: Alberta
- Specialized and rural municipalities: Flagstaff County, Wainwright M.D. No. 61, Minburn County No. 27, Two Hills County No. 21, St. Paul County No. 19, Bonnyville M.D. No. 87, Lac La Biche County, I.D. No. 349, R.M. of Wood Buffalo
- Towns: Hardisty, St. Paul

Highway system
- Alberta Numbered Highway Network; List; Former
← Highway 880	→ Highway 882

Alberta Provincial Highway No. 881, commonly referred to as Highway 881, is a highway split into two sections in northeast Alberta, Canada. Each section is over 200 kilometres (120 mi) in length; the southern portion runs from Highway 13 in Hardisty to Highway 55 northwest of Bonnyville, while the northern section stretches from Highway 55 in Lac La Biche to the south side of Fort McMurray, serving as an important alternate route to Highway 63. A 72-kilometre (45 mi) section of Highway 55 joins the two sections. Lac La Biche County is lobbying the Government of Alberta to renumber the section of Highway 881 between Lac La Biche and Fort McMurray to Highway 36.

Both sections are entirely paved. This highway is also 49 Street in Hardisty, 53 Street in Irma, 47 Street in Mannville, 50 Street in Myrnam, and 40 Street in St. Paul.

== Future ==
In October 2012, the Government of Alberta announced $158 million in funding to improve Highway 881 between Lac La Biche and Fort McMurray, and an additional $150 million for extension of the highway from Anzac to Highway 69 (now Saprae Creek Trail) near Fort McMurray.

== Major intersections ==
Rural/specialized municipality	Location	km	mi	Destinations	Notes
Flagstaff County	Hardisty	0.0	0.0	Highway 13 – Camrose, Provost	Highway 881 southern terminus
M.D. of Wainwright No. 61	Irma	30.3	18.8	Highway 14 – Edmonton, Wainwright	
M.D. of Wainwright No. 61		51.8	32.2	Highway 619 west – Viking	South end of Highway 619 concurrency
County of Minburn No. 27		61.5	38.2	Highway 619 east	North end of Highway 619 concurrency
County of Minburn No. 27	Mannville	80.2	49.8	Highway 16 (TCH/YH) – Edmonton, Lloydminster	
↑ / ↓		104.9	65.2	Highway 631	
County of Two Hills No. 21	Myrnam	118.2	73.4	Highway 45 – Two Hills, Marwayne	
↑ / ↓		129.4	80.4	Crosses the North Saskatchewan River	
County of St. Paul No. 19		145.9	90.7	Highway 646 – Lafond, Elk Point	
County of St. Paul No. 19		156.5	97.2	Highway 29 east – Bonnyville, Elk Point	South end of Highway 29 concurrency
St. Paul		158.1	98.2	Highway 29 east (50 Avenue) / 40 Street	North end of Highway 29 concurrency
County of St. Paul No. 19	St. Vincent	176.1	109.4		
County of St. Paul No. 19		179.3	111.4	Highway 28 – Edmonton, Bonnyville, Cold Lake	
M.D. of Bonnyville		189.0	117.4	Highway 660 east – Glendon	
M.D. of Bonnyville		213.8	132.8	Highway 55 – Lac La Biche, Cold Lake	
69.6 km (43.2 mi) gap in Highway 881
Lac La Biche County	Lac La Biche	282.6	175.6	Highway 55 / Highway 36 south – Boyle, Vilna, Cold Lake	Highway 36 northern terminus
Lac La Biche County	Lac La Biche	285.2	177.2	Highway 663 east – Beaver Lake	
Lac La Biche County		290.4	180.4	Lakeland Drive	Former Highway 881 alignment
Lac La Biche County		296.5	184.2	Township Road 672	Alternate route to Highway 663
Lac La Biche County		311.5	193.6	Highway 858 west – Plamondon	
Lac La Biche County	Imperial Mills	328.6	204.2		
R.M. of Wood Buffalo	Conklin	420.9	261.5		
R.M. of Wood Buffalo	Janvier	456.4	283.6		
R.M. of Wood Buffalo		502.8	312.4	La Loche Winter Trail	Winter road to La Loche, Saskatchewan; future Highway 956 east
R.M. of Wood Buffalo	Anzac	525.9	326.8		
R.M. of Wood Buffalo		538.5	334.6	Gregoire Lake Provincial Park	
R.M. of Wood Buffalo		547.5	340.2	Highway 63 – Edmonton, Fort McMurray	Highway 881 northern terminus
1.000 mi = 1.609 km; 1.000 km = 0.621 mi: Concurrency terminus

== See also ==
- List of Alberta provincial highways
