= Lindbergh, Alberta =

Lindbergh
- Hamlet
- Location of Lindbergh Lindbergh (Canada)
- Coordinates: 53°53′15″N 110°40′22″W
- Country: Canada
- Province: Alberta
- Region: Northern Alberta
- Census division: 12
- Municipal district: County of St. Paul No. 19

Government
  - Type: Unincorporated
  - Governing body: County of St. Paul No. 19 Council

Population (1991)
  - Total: 50
- Time zone: UTC−06:00 (Alberta Time)
- Area codes: 780, 587, 825

Lindbergh is a hamlet in Northern Alberta, Canada within the County of St. Paul No. 19. It is located approximately 17 kilometres (11 mi) east of Highway 41 and 77 kilometres (48 mi) northwest of Lloydminster. The first settlers of Lindbergh arrived some time in 1906, and by 1911 a ferry, school, and cemetery had been constructed in the area. When the CNR reached nearby Heinsburg in 1927, a post office was moved to Lindbergh from Riverview along with a store. In 1946 oil companies drilling near Lindbergh found salt and began the planning of a new salt plant which was completed in 1948.

== Demographics ==
Population history of Lindbergh
Year	Pop.	±%
1941	29	—
1951	61	+110.3%
1956	74	+21.3%
1961	85	+14.9%
1966	62	−27.1%
1971	50	−19.4%
1976	44	−12.0%
1981	47	+6.8%
1986	47	+0.0%
1991	50	+6.4%
Source: Statistics Canada

Lindbergh recorded a population of 50 in the 1991 Census of Population conducted by Statistics Canada.

== See also ==
- List of communities in Alberta
- List of hamlets in Alberta
