= Louise Bernice Halfe =

Cree poet and social worker

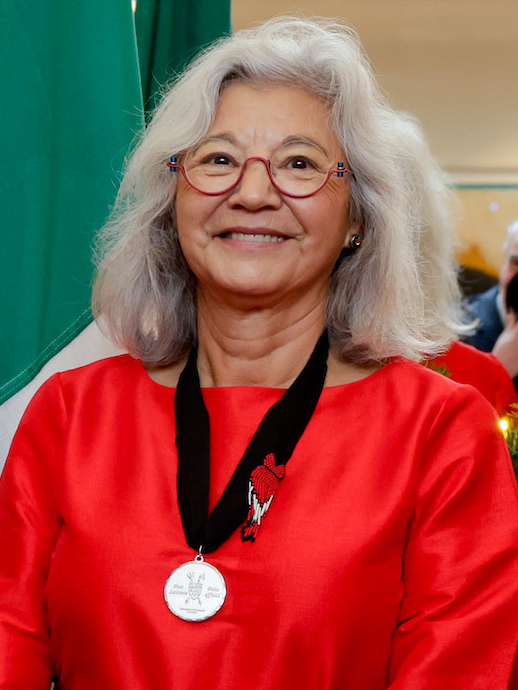
- Halfe in November 2022
- Born: April 8, 1953 (age 73); Two Hills, Alberta
- Occupations: Author, Poet, Social Worker & Acting Elder
- Spouse: Married
- Children: 2 Children & 3 Grandchildren
- Writing career
- Notable works: Bear Bones and Feathers, Blue Marrow, The Crooked Good & Burning in This Midnight Dream
- Notable awards: PEI Milton Acorn Award for Bear Bones and Feathers, 1996, Saskatoon Book Award and the First Peoples Publishing Award, Saskatchewan's Poet Laureate

Louise Bernice Halfe CM is a Cree poet and social worker from Saskatoon, Saskatchewan, Canada. Halfe's Cree name is Sky Dancer. At the age of seven, she was forced to attend Blue Quills Indian Residential School in St. Paul, Alberta. Her experience in the residential school system greatly influenced her writing. Halfe's books have been well-received and have won multiple awards. In 2021, Halfe was appointed as the new Canadian Parliamentary Poet Laureate.

Halfe signed with Coteau Books in 1994 and has published four books of poetry: Bear Bones & Feathers (1994), Blue Marrow (1998/2005), The Crooked Good (2007) and Burning in this Midnight Dream (2016). Halfe uses code-switching, white space, and the stories of other Cree women in her poetry.

== Personal life ==
Louise Halfe was born on April 8, 1953. She is also known by her Cree name Sky Dancer. She was born in Two Hills, Alberta, and was raised on the Saddle Lake Reserve. When she was seven years old, Louise was forced to attend Blue Quills Residential School in St. Paul, Alberta; she remained there for nine years. At the age of sixteen, she left home and broke ties with her family. This gave her the opportunity to complete her studies at St. Paul's Regional High School. While Halfe attended high school, she developed an interest in writing. She started a journal to write about her memories and life experiences.

During her six years at The University of Saskatchewan, Halfe lived off campus in Northern Saskatchewan.

Halfe earned a Bachelor of Social Work from the University of Regina and a certificate in Drug and Alcohol Counselling from the Nechi Institute.

== Career ==
In 1990, Halfe was first published in the collection Writing the Circle: Native Women of Western Canada. Her next publication was a piece in Residential Schools: The Stolen Years (1993) which was a collection of writing by residential school survivors. Her first book, Bear Bones & Feathers, was started in a journal during her academic career; it was published in 1994. She has published three more books: Blue Marrow (2004), Crooked Good (2007), and Burning in This Midnight Dream (2016). In 2018, as part of the Laurier Poetry Series, her previously published works were compiled in Sôhkêyihta: The Poetry of Sky Dancer Louise Bernice Halfe.

In 2005, Halfe became Saskatchewan's Poet Laureate. She is the second person ever to hold the title. Then, in 2012, Halfe received an honorary Doctorate of Letters from Wilfrid Laurier University. She is currently the acting Elder at the University of Saskatchewan.

== Poetic style ==
Halfe uses code-switching in her work. Code-switching is largely a response to the devastation of Aboriginal languages. Their loss is connected to the legacy of residential schools. The use of code-switching shows a fragmentation of history, culture, and land base which cannot be conveyed through English alone. Halfe code-switches between Cree and English, as well as between Cree-English and standardized English. Halfe personalizes the Cree language in her work by using possessive kinship terms. Halfe is also known to use the language of the church, or "Whiteman's words," in her work. Halfe has said that writing helps her reconnect to her culture and language.

Halfe writes poetry about the women that have come before her. Her writing focuses on the kinship relations between women, the stories women have to tell, and their histories. Halfe's poetry reasserts the importance of women in Cree culture.

Halfe works with Cree intellectual traditions in her poetry. She tells women's stories to explore the link between creation and knowledge in Cree storytelling. In The Crooked Good, Halfe explores Cree sacred history using a Cree feminist perspective.

Halfe incorporates the white space on the page into the meaning of her poems. According to Halfe, the white space represents the settler-colonial idea of terra nullius and, therefore, signifies erasure, a loss of language, and an inability to speak. Halfe says that every word she writes on the page is a political act against silence and erasure.

Halfe often writes about a connection to the land that is both spiritual and political.

Halfe titled her book Blue Marrow to invoke the image of using a bone writing in blue ink. The title re-appropriates the "blue quill" of Blue Quills Residential School. Much of Halfe's poetry reflects on her time at the school and the effect it had on her, her family, and her community.

== Critical reception ==
Halfe's work has been generally well accepted. Cahoots Magazine has praised her use of Aboriginal spirality and feminist exposure in Bear Bones & Feathers. Her book Burning in This Midnight Dream received numerous awards, such as the Saskatchewan Book Awards and the Indigenous Peoples' Publishing Award. The judges from these events have stated that Halfe's poetic storytelling reflects the harm inflicted by Canada's residential school system, calling her verses "heartbreaking and hopeful" and noting her attention to creating a healing atmosphere through specific use of Cree language and culture.

Other works by Halfe have received similar reviews, often applauding Halfe's use of code-switching for taking back the Cree language. This is prominent in Halfe's Blue Marrow and Sôhkêyihta: The Poetry of Sky Dancer Louise Bernice Halfe. Critics have also noted Halfe's focus on both mind and spirituality. Cheryl Petten for the Saskatchewan Review had noted that readers not only responded intellectually to Halfe's The Crooked Good but emotionally as well.

== Awards ==
Louise Halfe has won many awards and has received positive recognition as an independent Canadian author and poet. After making her debut, Halfe won third place in the League of Canadian Poets' Historical Poetry Contest.

Her first book of poetry, Bear Bones & Feathers, won the Milton Acorn People's Poet Award in 1996. Blue Marrow was nominated for the Pat Lowther First Book Award. In 1998, Blue Marrow was a finalist for the Governor General's Award for Poetry, the Saskatoon Book Award, and the Saskatchewan Poetry Award. The Crooked Goodwon the First Peoples Publishing Award and the Saskatoon Book Award in 2008. It was also nominated for the Poetry Award honouring Anne Szumigalski in the same year. Halfe was also shortlisted for the Spirit of Saskatchewan Award. In 2017, Burning in This Midnight Dream won the Indigenous Peoples' Publishing award, the Rasmussen, Ramussen & Charowsky Indigenous Peoples' Writing award and the Saskatchewan Arts Board Poetry Award. Burning in This Midnight Dream also won the League of Canadian Poets Raymond Souster Award and the High Plains Book Award for Indigenous Writers. Burning in This Midnight Dream was also the 2017 WILLA Literacy Award Finalist in Poetry.

In 2016, Halfe received the Hnatyshyn Foundation REVEAL award which recognizes Indigenous artists living in Canada and, in 2017, she was given the Latner Writers' Trust Award in recognition of a remarkable body of work.

She was made a Member of the Order of Canada in 2025.

== Works ==
- Bear Bones & Feathers, 1994
- Blue Marrow, 2004
- The Crooked Good, 2007
- Burning in this Midnight Dream, 2016
- Sôhkêyihta: The Poetry of Sky Dancer Louise Bernice Halfe, 2018
