= Alberta Highway 36 =

Highway in Alberta

Highway 36
- Veterans Memorial Highway
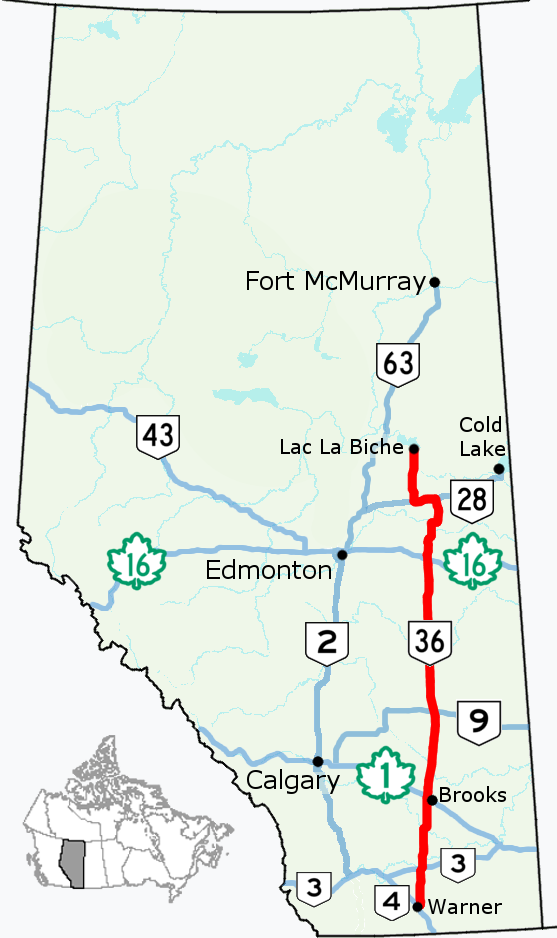
- Highway 36 highlighted in red

Route information
- Maintained by the Ministry of Transportation and Economic Corridors
- Length: 679 km (422 mi)

Major junctions
- South end: Highway 4 in Warner
- Highway 3 in Taber; Highway 1 (TCH) near Brooks; Highway 9 near Hanna; Highway 13 in Killam; Highway 14 in Viking; Highway 16 (TCH) near Lavoy; Highway 45 in Two Hills; Highway 29 in St. Brides; Highway 28 in Ashmont; Highway 28 near Vilna
- North end: Highway 55 in Lac La Biche

Location
- Country: Canada
- Province: Alberta
- Specialized and rural municipalities: Warner No. 5 County, Taber M.D., Newell County, Special Area No. 2, Paintearth No. 18 County, Flagstaff County, Beaver County, Minburn No. 27 County, Two Hills No. 21 County, St. Paul No. 19 County, Smoky Lake County, Lac La Biche County
- Towns: Taber, Vauxhall, Killam, Viking, Two Hills
- Villages: Warner, Vilna

Highway system
- Alberta Numbered Highway Network; List; Former
← Highway 35	→ Highway 37

Highway 36, officially named Veterans Memorial Highway, is a north–south highway in eastern Alberta, Canada, that extends from Highway 4 near Warner to Highway 55 in Lac La Biche. Highway 36, along with Highway 41 and the portion of Highway 881 north of Lac La Biche, is part of the Eastern Alberta Trade Corridor, an economic development corridor that links the oil sands with Texas and Mexico, and works in association with the North American Ports-to-Plains Alliance.

== Route description ==
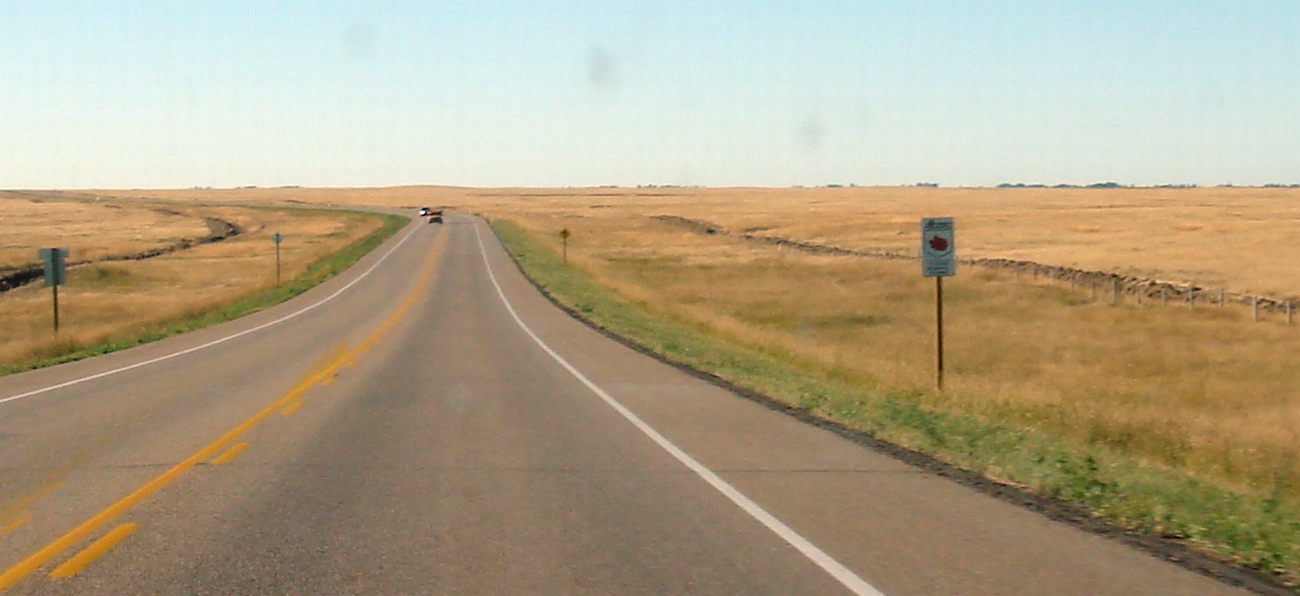
Southbound, south of Vauxhall

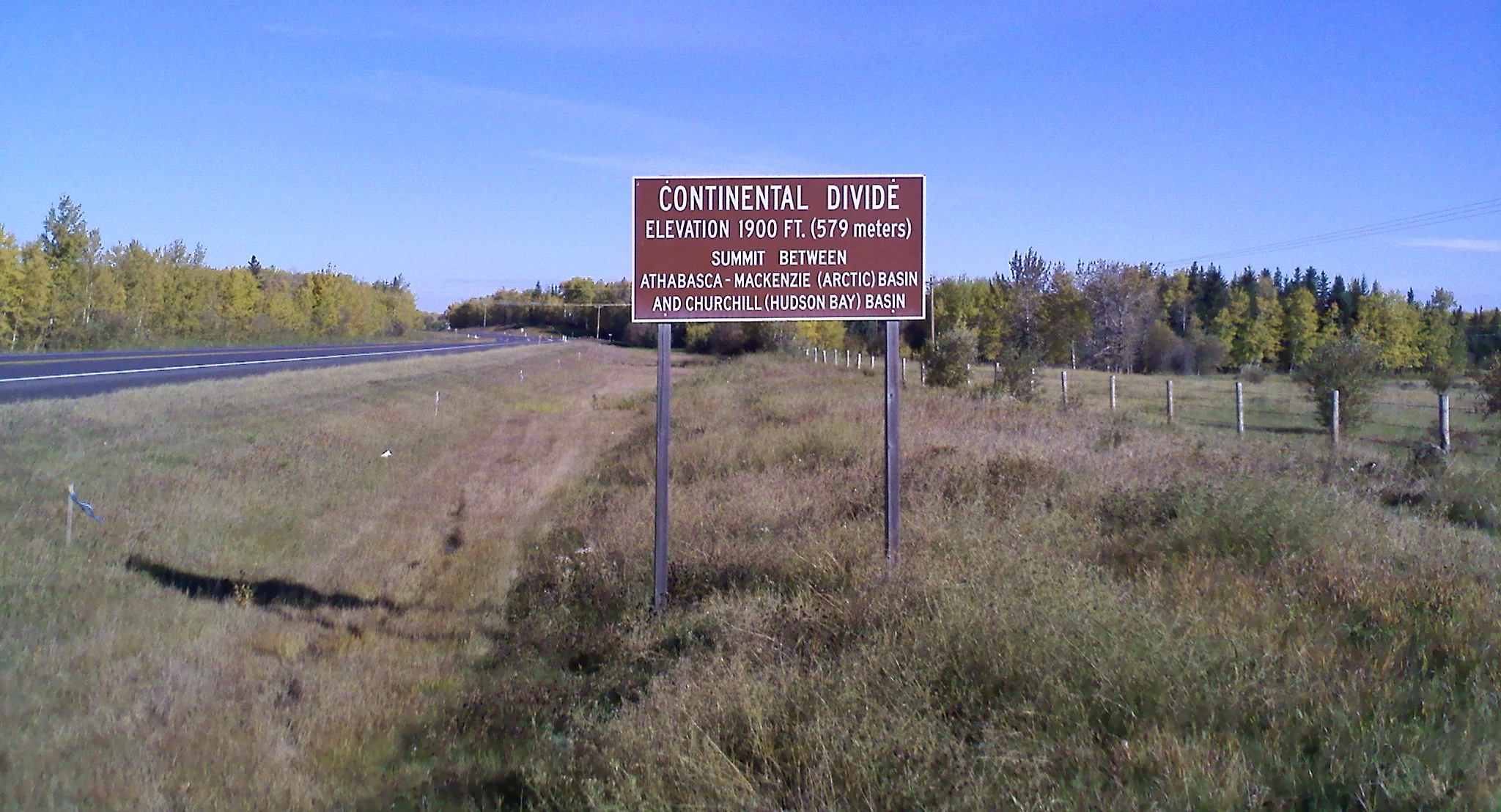
Northbound, south of Lac La Biche, marking the divide between the Arctic basin, and the Hudson Bay basin.

Highway 36 begins at Highway 4 near Warner, 38 kilometres (24 mi) north of the Canada–United States border at Coutts. It intersects Highway 61 (Red Coat Trail), about 2.3 kilometres (1.4 mi) northwest Wrentham, before reaching Taber where it has a 2.6-kilometre (2 mi) concurrency with the Crowsnest Highway (Highway 3). Highway 36 continues north, crossing the Oldman River, passing through Vauxhall, and crossing the Bow River before intersecting the Trans-Canada Highway (Highway 1) about 8 kilometres (5 mi) northwest of Brooks. It continues north past Duchess, crosses the Red Deer River, and continues to Highway 9 where it heads west and the two routes share an 2.6-kilometre (1.6 mi) concurrency. Highway 36 departs Highway 9 about 7 kilometres (4 mi) east of Hanna and continues north, intersecting Highway 12 about 4 kilometres (2 mi) southeast of Castor, Highway 53 about 16 kilometres (10 mi) east of Forestburg, crossing the Battle River about 6 kilometres (4 mi) south of Alliance, and intersecting Highway 13 on the east side of Killam. At Highway 26, Highway 36 heads east and the two routes share an 4-kilometre (2.5 mi) concurrency before Highway 36 continues north for 9 kilometres (6 mi) and intersects Highway 14 at Viking before intersecting the Yellowhead Highway (Highway 16) about 6 kilometres (4 mi) east of Lavoy or 16 kilometres (10 mi) east of Vegreville. Highway 36 continues to Two Hills, where it meets Highway 45, where Highway 36 heads east and the two routes share an 4-kilometre (2 mi) concurrency. Highway 36 travels north 6.5 kilometres (4 mi) before it reaches Highway 29 and the two routes share a 33-kilometre (20 mi) concurrency, crossing the North Saskatchewan River in the process. At St. Brides, Highway 29 heads east towards St. Paul, 15 kilometres (9 mi) to the east. Highway 36 continues north to Highway 28 at the southwestern edge of Ashmont, where it heads west and the two routes share an 31-kilometre (20 mi) concurrency before to turns north about 8 kilometres (5 mi) west of Vilna. Highway 36 meets Highway 55 (Northern Woods and Water Route) about 20 kilometres (12 mi) south of Lac La Biche; and the two routes share a concurrency into Lac La Biche and Highway 36 ends.

== Future ==
The Alberta government has studied constructing interchanges at both Highway 1 and Highway 16; however neither project have been funded and no construction timelines have been established.

Lac La Biche County has unsuccessfully lobbied the Government of Alberta to renumber Highway 881 to Highway 36 from Lac La Biche north to Highway 63 south of Fort McMurray, with the first attempt being in 2013 and revisited in 2023. The two routes are both part of the Eastern Alberta Trade Corridor and if proposal were to be successful, it would extend Highway 36 by 265 kilometres (165 mi) to a total length of 944 kilometres (587 mi).

== Major intersections ==
Rural/specialized municipality	Location	km	mi	Destinations	Notes
County of Warner No. 5	Warner	0.0	0.0	Highway 4 – Coutts, Lethbridge	Highway 36 southern terminus
County of Warner No. 5		1.0	0.62	Highway 504 east	
County of Warner No. 5	Wrentham	27.4	17.0	Highway 61 – Lethbridge, Foremost, Manyberries	
M.D. of Taber		44.8	27.8	Highway 513 east	
Taber		57.2	35.5	Highway 3 west – Lethbridge	South end of Highway 3 concurrency
Taber		59.8	37.2	Highway 3 east – Medicine Hat	North end of Highway 3 concurrency
M.D. of Taber		80.1	49.8	Crosses the Oldman River	
M.D. of Taber		84.1	52.3	Highway 875 north – Hays, Rolling Hills	
M.D. of Taber	Vauxhall	93.2	57.9	Highway 524 west – Retlaw	South end of Highway 524 concurrency
M.D. of Taber		97.6	60.6	Highway 524 east – Hays, Redcliff	North end of Highway 524 concurrency
M.D. of Taber		104.1	64.7	Highway 526 west – Enchant	
↑ / ↓		113.9	70.8	Crosses the Bow River	
County of Newell		115.7	71.9	Highway 530 east – Rolling Hills	
County of Newell		120.3	74.8	UAR 110 west – Scandia	
County of Newell		129.8	80.7	Highway 873 – Rainier, Kinbrook Island Provincial Park	
County of Newell		143.0	88.9	Highway 539 west – Lomond	
County of Newell	Cassils	152.8	94.9	Highway 542 east – Brooks	
County of Newell		160.1	99.5	Highway 1 (TCH) – Calgary, Brooks, Medicine Hat	
County of Newell		166.0	103.1	Highway 544 east – Patricia, Dinosaur Provincial Park	
County of Newell	Duchess	172.2	107.0	Highway 550 – Rosemary, Duchess	
County of Newell		190.3	118.2	Highway 556 west – Gem	
↑ / ↓		192.5	119.6	Crosses the Red Deer River	
Special Area No. 2		203.2	126.3	Highway 561 east – Cessford	
Special Area No. 2		232.9	144.7	Highway 570 – Sunnynook, Dorothy	
Special Area No. 2		259.3	161.1	Highway 577 east – Sheerness	
Special Area No. 2		272.8	169.5	Highway 9 east – Oyen	South end of Highway 9 concurrency
Special Area No. 2		275.4	171.1	Highway 9 west – Hanna, Drumheller, Calgary	North end of Highway 9 concurrency
Special Area No. 2		278.7	173.2	Township Road 312 – Hanna	
Special Area No. 2		288.4	179.2	Highway 586 east	
County of Paintearth No. 18	Castor	339.6	211.0	Highway 12 – Stettler, Coronation	
County of Paintearth No. 18	Castor	342.2	212.6	Highway 599 west	South end of Highway 599 concurrency
County of Paintearth No. 18		344.3	213.9	Highway 599 east	North end of Highway 599 concurrency
↑ / ↓		365.0	226.8	Crosses the Battle River	
Flagstaff County		368.2	228.8	Highway 602 east – Alliance	
Flagstaff County		378.3	235.1	UAR 137 west – Galahad	
Flagstaff County		384.8	239.1	Highway 53 west – Forestburg; Highway 608 east	
Flagstaff County	Killam	408.7	254.0	Highway 13 – Camrose, Provost	
Beaver County		433.6	269.4	Highway 26 west – Camrose	South end of Highway 26 concurrency
Beaver County		437.5	271.8	Highway 26 east – Kinsella	North end of Highway 26 concurrency; former Highway 615 east
Beaver County	Viking	446.0	277.1	Highway 14 – Edmonton, Wainwright	
Beaver County	Viking	446.2	277.3	Highway 619 east – Lloydminster	
County of Minburn No. 27		483.9	300.7	Highway 16 (TCH/YH) – Edmonton, Lloydminster	
County of Minburn No. 27		496.8	308.7	Highway 631	
County of Two Hills No. 21	Two Hills	516.7	321.1	Highway 45 west – Bruderheim	South end of Highway 45 concurrency
County of Two Hills No. 21		520.5	323.4	Highway 45 east – Marwayne	North end of Highway 45 concurrency
County of Two Hills No. 21		527.0	327.5	Highway 29 west – Hairy Hill, Lamont	South end of Highway 29 concurrency; former Highway 637 west
County of Two Hills No. 21	Duvernay Brosseau	528.8	328.6	Crosses the North Saskatchewan River (Note: Duvernay is on the south bank of the North Saskatchewan River and Brosseau is on the north bank.)	
County of St. Paul No. 19		548.5	340.8	Highway 646 east – Lafond, Elk Point	
County of St. Paul No. 19		558.4	347.0	Highway 652 west – Saddle Lake	
County of St. Paul No. 19	St. Brides	560.0	348.0	Highway 29 east – St. Paul	North end of Highway 29 concurrency; former Highway 28 east
County of St. Paul No. 19	Ashmont	575.7	357.7	Highway 28 east – Bonnyville, Cold Lake	South end of Highway 28 concurrency; former Highway 28A east
County of St. Paul No. 19		582.7	362.1	Highway 866 north – McRae	
Smoky Lake County		598.1	371.6	Highway 859 south – Hamlin	
Smoky Lake County	Vilna	599.4	372.4	UAR 116 north	
Smoky Lake County		606.9	377.1	Highway 28 west – Smoky Lake, Edmonton	North end of Highway 28 concurrency
Smoky Lake County	Kikino Metis Settlement	642.7	399.4	UAR 213 west – Kikino	
Lac La Biche County		661.3	410.9	Highway 55 east – Cold Lake	South end of Highway 55 concurrency
Lac La Biche County	Lac La Biche	679.0	421.9	Highway 55 west – Athabasca; Highway 881 north – Beaver Lake, Conklin, Fort McMurray	Highway 36 northern terminus; north end of Highway 55 concurrency
Lac La Biche County	Lac La Biche	681.1	423.2	101 Avenue	Former Highway 55 / Highway 881 alignment
1.000 mi = 1.609 km; 1.000 km = 0.621 mi: Closed/former; Concurrency terminus
