= Two Hills =

Two Hills can refer to:

- Two Hills, Alberta, a town in Alberta, Canada
- County of Two Hills No. 21, a municipal district in Alberta, Canada
