= Musidora, Alberta =

Musidora
- Hamlet
- Location of Musidora Musidora (Canada)
- Coordinates: 53°41′23″N 111°35′03″W
- Country: Canada
- Province: Alberta
- Region: Central Alberta
- Census division: 10
- Municipal district: County of Two Hills No. 21

Government
  - Type: Unincorporated
  - Governing body: County of Two Hills No. 21 Council

Population (1991)
  - Total: 13
- Time zone: UTC−06:00 (Alberta Time)
- Area codes: 780, 587, 825

Musidora is a hamlet in central Alberta, Canada within the County of Two Hills No. 21. It is located on Highway 45, approximately 112 kilometres (70 mi) northwest of Lloydminster.

== Toponymy ==
Musidora was named at some point before 1909 by Édouard Roberge (also recorded as Edward), a Quebec-born farmer who served as the postmaster of nearby Beauvallon from 1910 to 1917. Roberge was contracted to transport mail to settlements in the areas of Musidora, Beauvallon, and Duvernay. Alberta Culture suggested that Roberge selected the name owing to its popularity as a woman's name at the time, derived from James Thomson's poem "The Seasons" (1730).

== Demographics ==
Musidora recorded a population of 13 in the 1991 Census of Population conducted by Statistics Canada.

== Geography ==
Musidora contains four conservation areas, spanning 910 acres between them. The sites are maintained by the Alberta Conservation Association in partnership with the Alberta Wildlife Federation, Suncor Energy Foundation, and Ducks Unlimited Canada.

=== Ecology ===
As of 2025, fauna living in Musidora and surrounding areas includes white-tailed and mule deer, black bears, ruffled grouse, and moose. Flora in the area includes aspen and balsam poplar trees.

== History ==
Early settlers in Musidora were of predominantly Ukrainian descent. In 1910, a group of 88 settlers from Brody travelled together to settle in the area; among them were the paternal great-grandparents of Wayne Babych. A post office opened in Musidora in 1909, followed by a Ukrainian-owned general store in 1911.

In 1927, the Canadian Pacific Railway began building a line through Musidora to connect Whitford, Alberta to Cut Knife, Saskatchewan. The railway line brought expansion to Musidora. A garage and blacksmith opened by January 1930, and over the next twenty years, the hamlet's population grew to a peak of over 100 residents. At least 28 unique families lived in the area in the late 1950s.

In 1974, visiting Orthodox priest Fr. P. Zubrytsky observed a decline in Musidora's population. This owed to farmers retiring and selling their land, or the children of the original Ukrainian settlers leaving the area.

=== Political activities ===
During the 1930s, Musidora hosted an active communist association.

== Religious communities ==
Between 1916 and 1928, followers of Russian Orthodoxy made efforts to rally support in Musidora for establishing a church. Other residents were content to attend sermons by Basilian Fathers in nearby Mundare. A short-lived Catholic church operated on resident John Kolisniak's farm in the 1910s, and Musidora also hosted an active congregation of Ukrainian Presbyterians around the year 1916.

Ultimately, an Orthodox church was built between 1928 and 1929, and named St. Mary. According to historian Diana Kordan, the church, which remains functional as of 2025, has several unusual features for similar churches of its time, suggesting it was built with few resources and without clerical expertise. The church lacks a separation between the narthex and nave that, by 1929, was already "evocative of an earlier era," and the congregation is positioned to face west rather than the customary east.

Congregants could not agree on whether St. Mary should remain independent or formally join the Ukrainian Greek Orthodox Church of Canada (UGOC). Residents who allied with the Russian Orthodox position strongly believed that it should remain independent, while others feared that not incorporating with the UGOC would leave St. Mary vulnerable to a land claim against its cemetery, which had once been under Catholic control. While the church ultimately remained independent, it was served by UGOC priests.

Attendance numbers at St. Mary reflected Musidora's modest population. Membership peaked at 28 families between the mid-1950s and early 1960s. By 1970, only 5 families regularly attended liturgies. In 1978, the parish, struggling with the church's upkeep, considered selling the church to a private buyer, but the sale fell through due to resistance from locals and the UGOC's Consistory. St. Mary fell under the administration of the UGOC's Western Eparchy, where it remains as of 2025.

== In the media ==
Musidora is the setting of the winning entry to Alberta Views' 2015 short story contest, "Breathe In" by Bruce Cinnamon.

== See also ==
- List of communities in Alberta
- List of hamlets in Alberta
