= Lottie Lake =

- Hamlet
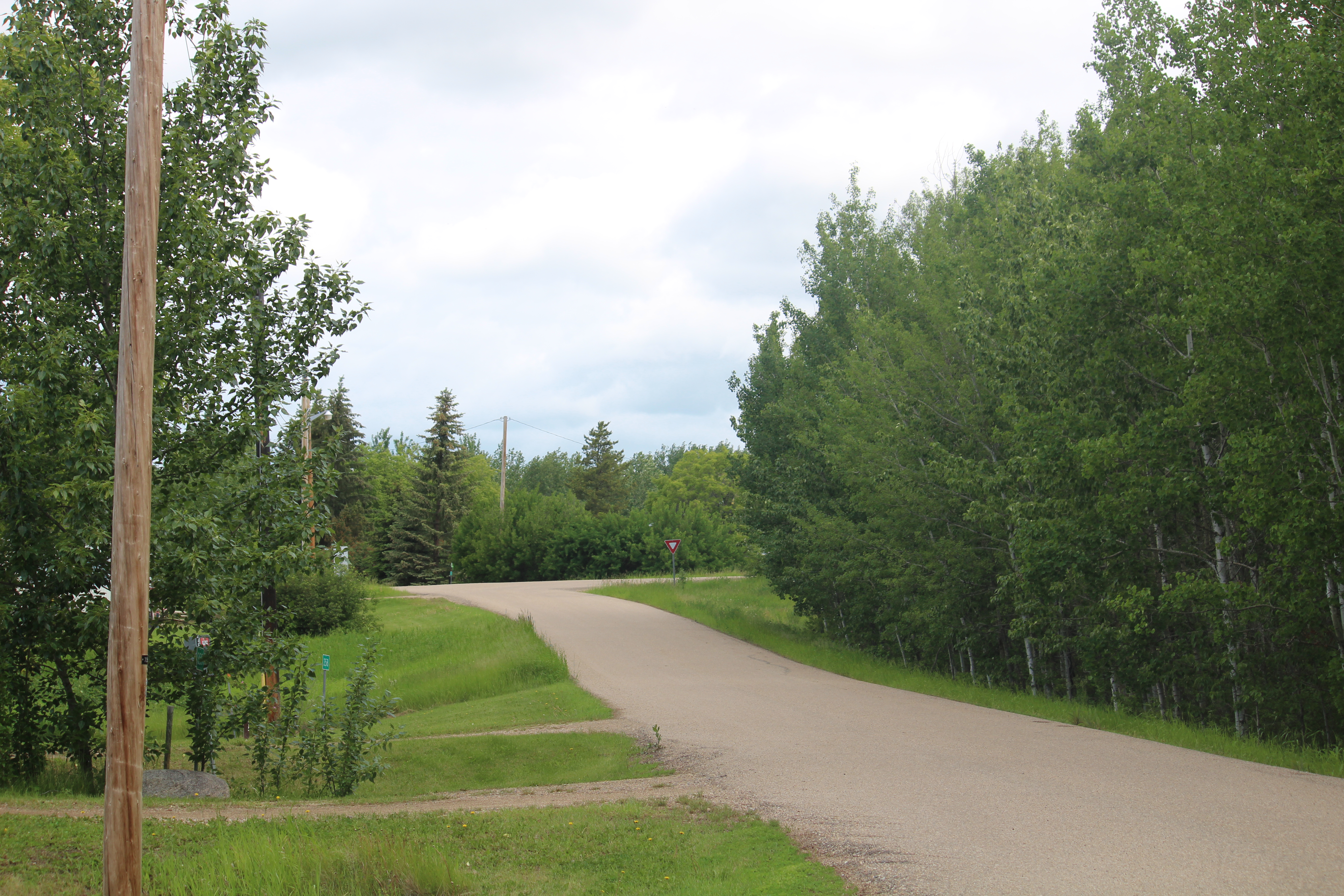
- Main street in Lottie Lake

- Location of Lottie Lake Lottie Lake (Canada)
- Coordinates: 54°03′28″N 111°34′06″W
- Country: Canada
- Province: Alberta
- Region: Central Alberta
- Census division: 12
- Municipal district: County of St. Paul No. 19

Government
  - Type: Unincorporated
  - Governing body: County of St. Paul No. 19 Council

Population (1991)
  - Total: 94
- Time zone: UTC−06:00 (Alberta Time)
- Area codes: 780, 587, 825

Lottie Lake is a hamlet in northern Alberta, Canada within the County of St. Paul No. 19. It is located 1 kilometre (0.62 mi) west of Highway 36, approximately 138 kilometres (86 mi) northeast of Edmonton.

== Demographics ==
Lottie Lake recorded a population of 94 in the 1991 Census of Population conducted by Statistics Canada.

== See also ==
- List of communities in Alberta
- List of hamlets in Alberta
