= St. Lina =

- Hamlet
- Location of St. Lina St. Lina (Canada) St. Lina (North America)
- Coordinates: 54°17′46″N 111°27′13″W
- Country: Canada
- Province: Alberta
- Region: Central Alberta
- Census division: 12
- Municipal district: County of St. Paul No. 19

Government
  - Type: Unincorporated
  - Governing body: County of St. Paul No. 19 Council

Population (1991)
  - Total: 24
- Time zone: UTC−06:00 (Alberta Time)
- Area codes: 780, 587, 825

St. Lina or Ste-Lina in French, is a hamlet in northern Alberta, Canada within the County of St. Paul No. 19. It is home of St. Lina Community Hall. It is located approximately 14 kilometres (8.7 mi) north of Highway 28 and 85 kilometres (53 mi) southwest of Cold Lake.

== History ==
On 20 August 1856 Father Malsonneuve set out with four men to open a trail from Lac La Biche by way of Sugden, Ste-Lina and St-Vincent. None of these hamlets were named at the time. The trail soon became a route for the hauling of supplies to northern points on the Athabasca River.

The trail wended its way passing east of the present hamlet of Mallaig. The Lac La Biche trail wends its way in a north-westerly direction past a farm owned in 1978 by W. Christensen and north to cross a creek just east of Ste-Lina. A camp was set up for travellers and to water horses before proceeding further.

As white settlers traveled this part of Canada and relayed information back East of the furs and timber in the area, the population grew. Surveyors mapped out the land, and it was opened to homesteaders for a nominal fee of $10.00 with certain requirements. St. Lina was named and became a hamlet as well as Goodridge, Beaver River, Sugden, Boyne Lake, McRae and Ashmont.

== Climate ==
Climate data for St. Lina
Month	Jan	Feb	Mar	Apr	May	Jun	Jul	Aug	Sep	Oct	Nov	Dec	Year
Record high °C (°F)	12 (54)	13 (55)	16 (61)	31.1 (88.0)	32 (90)	35 (95)	33 (91)	36 (97)	33.5 (92.3)	27 (81)	17.8 (64.0)	11 (52)	36 (97)
Mean daily maximum °C (°F)	−10.5 (13.1)	−6.3 (20.7)	0.1 (32.2)	9.9 (49.8)	17.1 (62.8)	20.5 (68.9)	22.4 (72.3)	21.7 (71.1)	15.7 (60.3)	9.3 (48.7)	−2.5 (27.5)	−8.8 (16.2)	7.4 (45.3)
Daily mean °C (°F)	−15.8 (3.6)	−12 (10)	−5.7 (21.7)	3.5 (38.3)	9.9 (49.8)	13.8 (56.8)	15.9 (60.6)	14.8 (58.6)	9.4 (48.9)	3.6 (38.5)	−6.9 (19.6)	−13.7 (7.3)	1.4 (34.5)
Mean daily minimum °C (°F)	−21 (−6)	−17.7 (0.1)	−11.4 (11.5)	−2.9 (26.8)	2.7 (36.9)	7 (45)	9.3 (48.7)	7.9 (46.2)	3 (37)	−2 (28)	−11.3 (11.7)	−18.5 (−1.3)	−4.6 (23.7)
Record low °C (°F)	−48.3 (−54.9)	−45 (−49)	−39.4 (−38.9)	−31.5 (−24.7)	−10.0 (14.0)	−3 (27)	0 (32)	−4.5 (23.9)	−11.5 (11.3)	−22 (−8)	−37.5 (−35.5)	−46.1 (−51.0)	−48.3 (−54.9)
Average precipitation mm (inches)	25.9 (1.02)	15.1 (0.59)	18.2 (0.72)	31.1 (1.22)	51.3 (2.02)	76.6 (3.02)	88 (3.5)	69 (2.7)	48.7 (1.92)	19.3 (0.76)	20.1 (0.79)	23.6 (0.93)	486.9 (19.17)
Source: Environment Canada

== Demographics ==
Population history of St. Lina
Year	Pop.	±%
1941	76	—
1951	98	+28.9%
1956	87	−11.2%
1961	80	−8.0%
1966	59	−26.2%
1971	57	−3.4%
1976	56	−1.8%
1981	68	+21.4%
1986	44	−35.3%
1991	24	−45.5%
2025	~25*	—
Source: Statistics Canada

St. Lina recorded a population of 24 in the 1991 Census of Population conducted by Statistics Canada.

== See also ==
- List of communities in Alberta
- List of hamlets in Alberta
