= Boyne Lake, Alberta =

Coordinates: 54°14′17″N 111°40′39″W

Location of Boyne Lake Alberta

Boyne Lake is an unincorporated community in northern Alberta in the County of St. Paul No. 19, located 11 kilometres (6.8 mi) north of Highway 36, 142 kilometres (88 mi) northeast of Edmonton.

The community was named in commemoration of the Battle of the Boyne.
