= St. Brides, Alberta =

Community in Alberta, Canada

Coordinates: 53°59′35″N 111°32′30″W

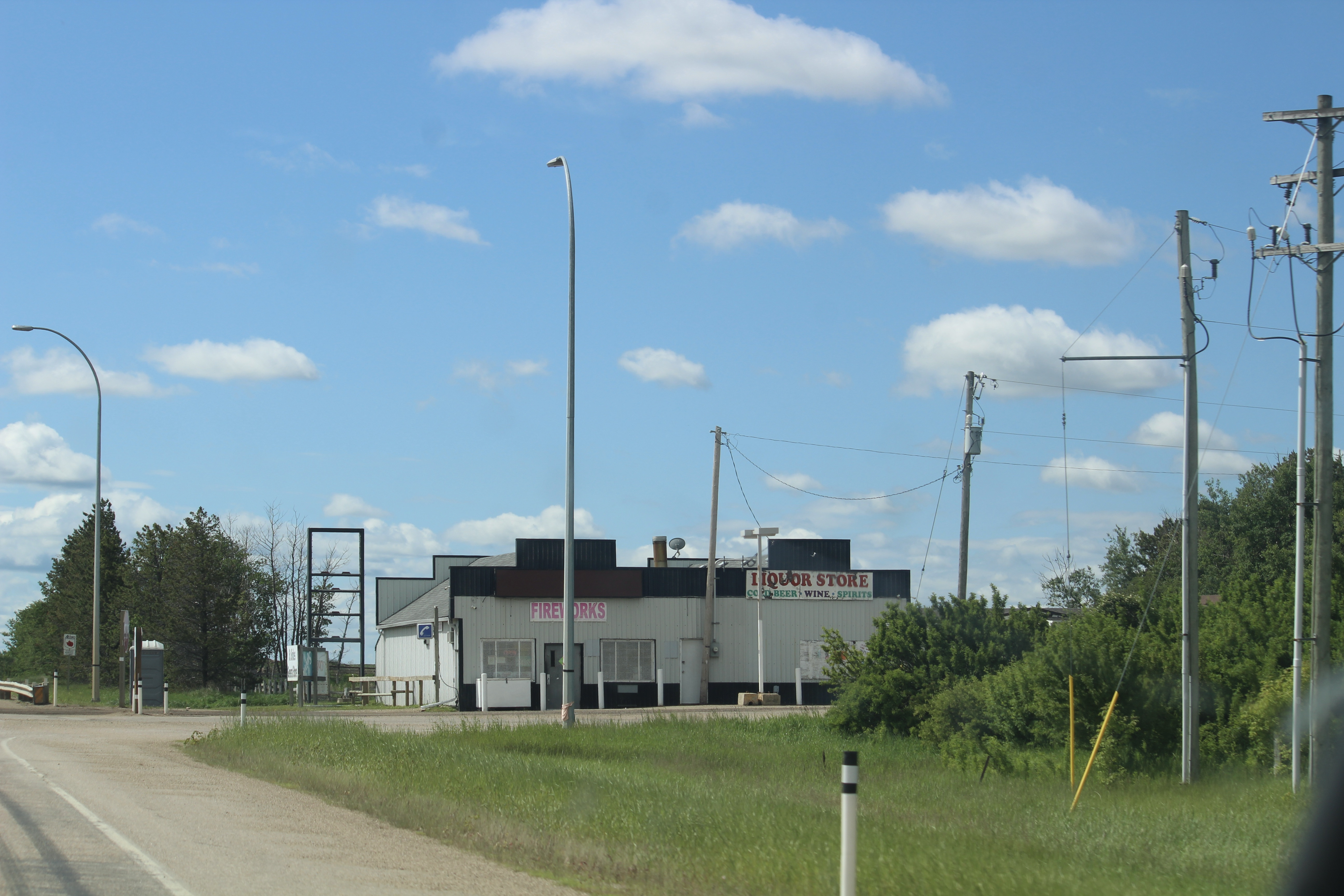
St. Brides General Store in St. Brides, Alberta

Location of St. Brides Alberta

St. Brides is an unincorporated community in northern Alberta within the County of St. Paul No. 19, located at the junction of Highway 29 and Highway 36, 15 km (9 mi) west of St. Paul. Established in 1927, this community in central Alberta was settled by 50 immigrant families from Northern Ireland.
