= Hillside Estates, Alberta =

Hillside Estates, Alberta may refer to:

- Hillside Estates, Parkland County, Alberta, a locality in Parkland County, Alberta
- Hillside Estates, St. Paul County No. 19, Alberta, a locality in St. Paul County No. 19, Alberta
