= Duvernay =

Duvernay is a last name of French origin:

It can refer to:

== People ==
- Devin Duvernay (born 1997), American football player
- Ludger Duvernay, a Canadian publisher
- Pauline Duvernay, a 19th-century French dancer
- Ava DuVernay, an American filmmaker and marketer

== Places ==
- Duvernay, Quebec, a former city, now a district of Laval, Quebec, Canada
- Duvernay, Alberta, a hamlet

== See also ==
- Duverney
