= 2017 census =

2017 census may refer to:

- 2017 Alberta municipal censuses
- 2017 Pakistani census
- 2017 Peru Census
