= Lac St. Cyr (Alberta) =

Lake in Alberta, Canada

- Location within Alberta
- Location: County of St. Paul No. 19, Alberta
- Coordinates: 53.896°N 111.193°W
- Basin countries: Canada
- Max. length: 2.3 km (1.4 mi)
- Max. width: 1.8 km (1.1 mi)
- Surface area: 2.46 km^{2} (0.95 sq mi)
- Average depth: 5.1 m (17 ft)
- Max. depth: 21 m (69 ft)
- Surface elevation: 648 m (2,126 ft)

Lac St. Cyr is a lake in the County of St. Paul No. 19, Alberta. The lake is near the town of St. Paul and since 1951 has been used as a source of water. In 1978, seasonal pumping of water from the North Saskatchewan River into the lake was begun to address a fall in the water level.
