= Brosseau, Alberta =

Brosseau
- Hamlet
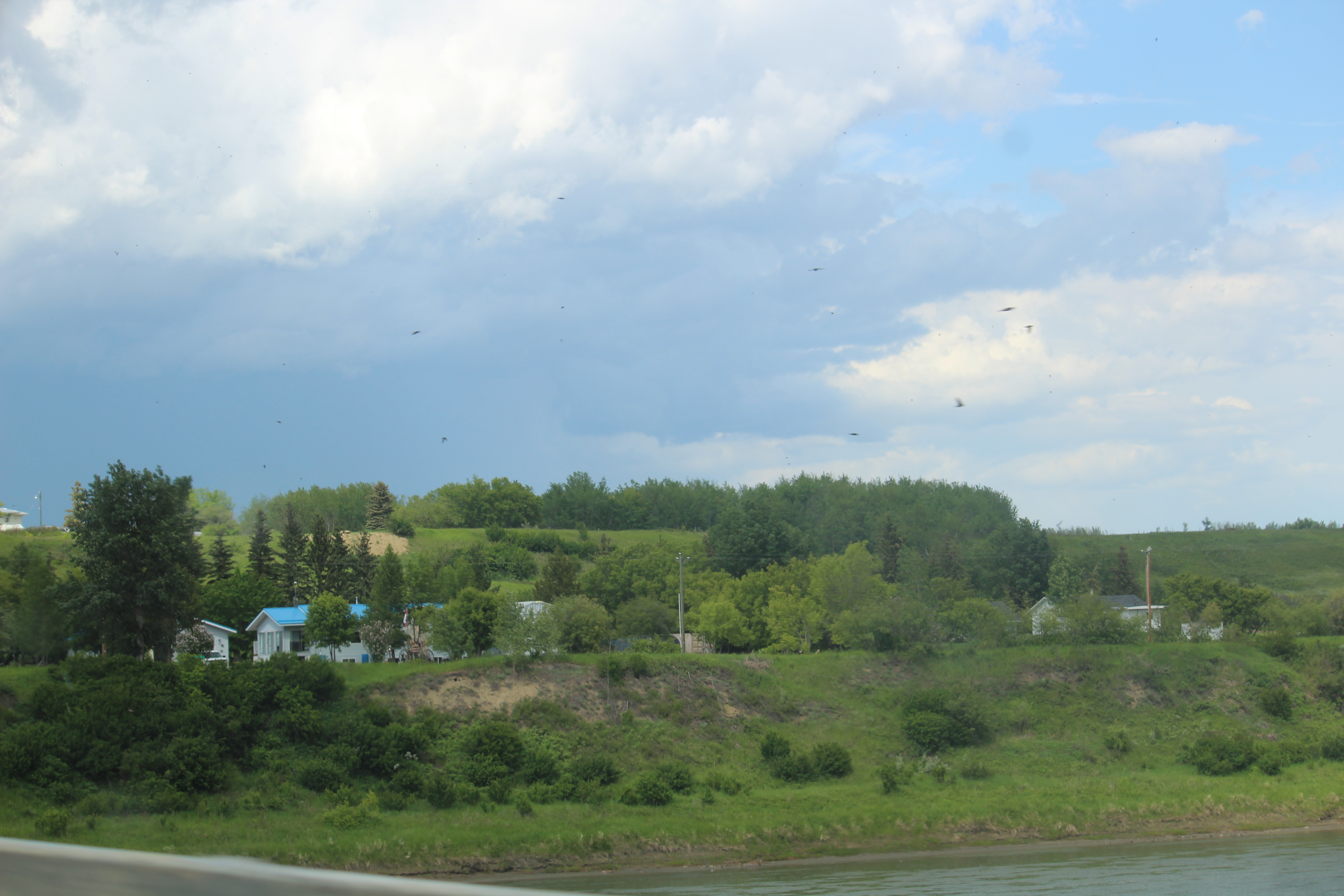

- Location of Brosseau Brosseau (Canada)
- Coordinates: 53°47′30″N 111°41′13″W
- Country: Canada
- Province: Alberta
- Region: Central Alberta
- Census division: 10
- Municipal district: County of Two Hills No. 21

Government
  - Type: Unincorporated
  - Governing body: County of Two Hills No. 21 Council

Population (1981)
  - Total: 13
- Time zone: UTC−06:00 (Alberta Time)
- Area codes: 780, 587, 825

Brosseau (English: /ˈbruːsoʊ/) is a hamlet in central Alberta, Canada within the County of Two Hills No. 21. It is located on the north bank of the North Saskatchewan River along the Highway 29 / Highway 36 concurrency, 50 km (31 mi) southwest of St. Paul. The hamlet of Duvernay is located immediately across the river along the south bank.

The hamlet has the name of Edmond Brosseau, an early settler.

Before Brosseau existed, a previous settlement had been created on the same site. Founded by Father Lacombe as Saint-Paul-des-Cris, it was a Catholic mission to the Cree which was established in 1865 and abandoned in 1874 due to Cree reluctance to adopt an agricultural lifestyle and several crop failures. Lacombe would try again nearby in 1896 with a new settlement called Saint-Paul-des-Métis, which also struggled until it was opened to white Francophones in 1909.

== Demographics ==
Brosseau recorded a population of 13 in the 1981 Census of Population conducted by Statistics Canada.

== See also ==
- List of communities in Alberta
- List of hamlets in Alberta
