= Myrnam =

- Village
- Village of Myrnam
- Location within Alberta
- Coordinates: 53°39′39.8″N 111°13′52.5″W
- Country: Canada
- Province: Alberta
- Region: Central Alberta
- Census division: 10
- Municipal district: County of Two Hills No. 21
- Founded: 1908
- Incorporated
  - Village: August 22, 1930

Government
  - Mayor: Donna Rudolf
  - Governing body: Myrnam Village Council

Area (2021)
  - Land: 2.75 km^{2} (1.06 sq mi)
- Elevation: 605 m (1,985 ft)

Population (2021)
  - Total: 257
  - Density: 93.6/km^{2} (242/sq mi)
- Time zone: UTC−06:00 (Alberta Time)
- Highways: Highway 45
- Website: Official website

Myrnam is a village in east central Alberta, Canada. It is located approximately 200 kilometres (120 mi) east of the capital city, Edmonton, and about 35 kilometres (22 mi) east-south-east of the town of Two Hills. Its economic base is mixed farming, cattle farming, and grain farming.

== History ==
Myrnam's post office opened in August 1908, and a small settlement formed around it. It was largely made up of Ukrainian immigrants, and named itself with the Ukrainian phrase meaning "peace to us." The Canadian Pacific Railway established a siding and townsite in 1927, and named it after the original settlement. It was incorporated as a village on August 22, 1930.

The former Myrnam Hospital is featured in a Heritage Minute, documenting the village's contribution to the construction of a larger hospital to service Myrnam and area.

== Geography ==
Myrnam is located 5 minutes south of the North Saskatchewan River, which provides both summer and winter recreational opportunities. It is on a flyway for Canada geese, snow geese, and sandhill cranes, providing opportunities for birdwatchers. There are two bird sanctuaries located near Myrnam, and Fort de L'Isle Historical Site is nearby.

== Demographics ==
In the 2021 Census of Population conducted by Statistics Canada, the Village of Myrnam had a population of 257 living in 122 of its 161 total private dwellings, a change of −24.2% from its 2016 population of 339. With a land area of 2.75 km^{2} (1.06 sq mi), it had a population density of 93.5/km^{2} (242.0/sq mi) in 2021.

In the 2016 Census of Population conducted by Statistics Canada, the Village of Myrnam recorded a population of 339 living in 140 of its 177 total private dwellings, a change of −8.4% from its 2011 population of 370. With a land area of 2.79 km^{2} (1.08 sq mi), it had a population density of 121.5/km^{2} (314.7/sq mi) in 2016.

== Education ==
Located in Myrnam is New Myrnam School, with a K-12 student population of about 120, as of 2019. The school also educates children from the neighbouring communities of Derwent and Beauvallon. The school teams are named the Barons. Sports and activities include curling, volleyball, badminton, track and field, golf, cross country, and basketball. The school also has a winter competition called Mukluk, usually held in February.

== Events and clubs ==
- The Myrnam and District Ukrainian Dance Club
- Myrnam Soccer Club
- Annual softball tournament (June)
- Myrnam 4-H Club
- Fun and Fair Days (July)

== Notable people ==
- Michael Fedechko, Anglican bishop
- Rocky Saganiuk, former professional hockey player

== See also ==
- List of communities in Alberta
- List of francophone communities in Alberta
- List of villages in Alberta
