= Del Thachuk =

Canadian football player (c.1936–2018)

Profile
- Position: Guard

Personal information
- Born: April 20, 1936; Lamont, Alberta
- Died: October 28, 2018 (aged 82)
- Listed height: 5 ft 11 in (1.80 m)
- Listed weight: 198 lb (90 kg)

Career history
- 1959–1960: Edmonton Eskimos

Ernest Delmor "Del" Thachuk (born c. April 20, 1936 - October 28, 2018) was a Canadian professional football player who played for the Edmonton Eskimos.References
