= Riverview, Alberta =

Riverview
- Hamlet
- Location of Riverview Riverview (Canada)
- Coordinates: 53°51′43″N 110°38′31″W
- Country: Canada
- Province: Alberta
- Region: Central Alberta
- Census division: 12
- Municipal district: County of St. Paul No. 19

Government
  - Type: Unincorporated
  - Governing body: County of St. Paul No. 19 Council

Population (1991)
  - Total: 49
- Time zone: UTC−06:00 (Alberta Time)
- Area codes: 780, 587, 825

Riverview is a hamlet in central Alberta, Canada within the County of St. Paul No. 19. It is located approximately 18 kilometres (11 mi) east of Highway 41 and 76 kilometres (47 mi) northwest of Lloydminster.

== Demographics ==
Riverview recorded a population of 49 in the 1991 Census of Population conducted by Statistics Canada.

== See also ==
- List of communities in Alberta
- List of hamlets in Alberta
