= Heinsburg =

- Hamlet
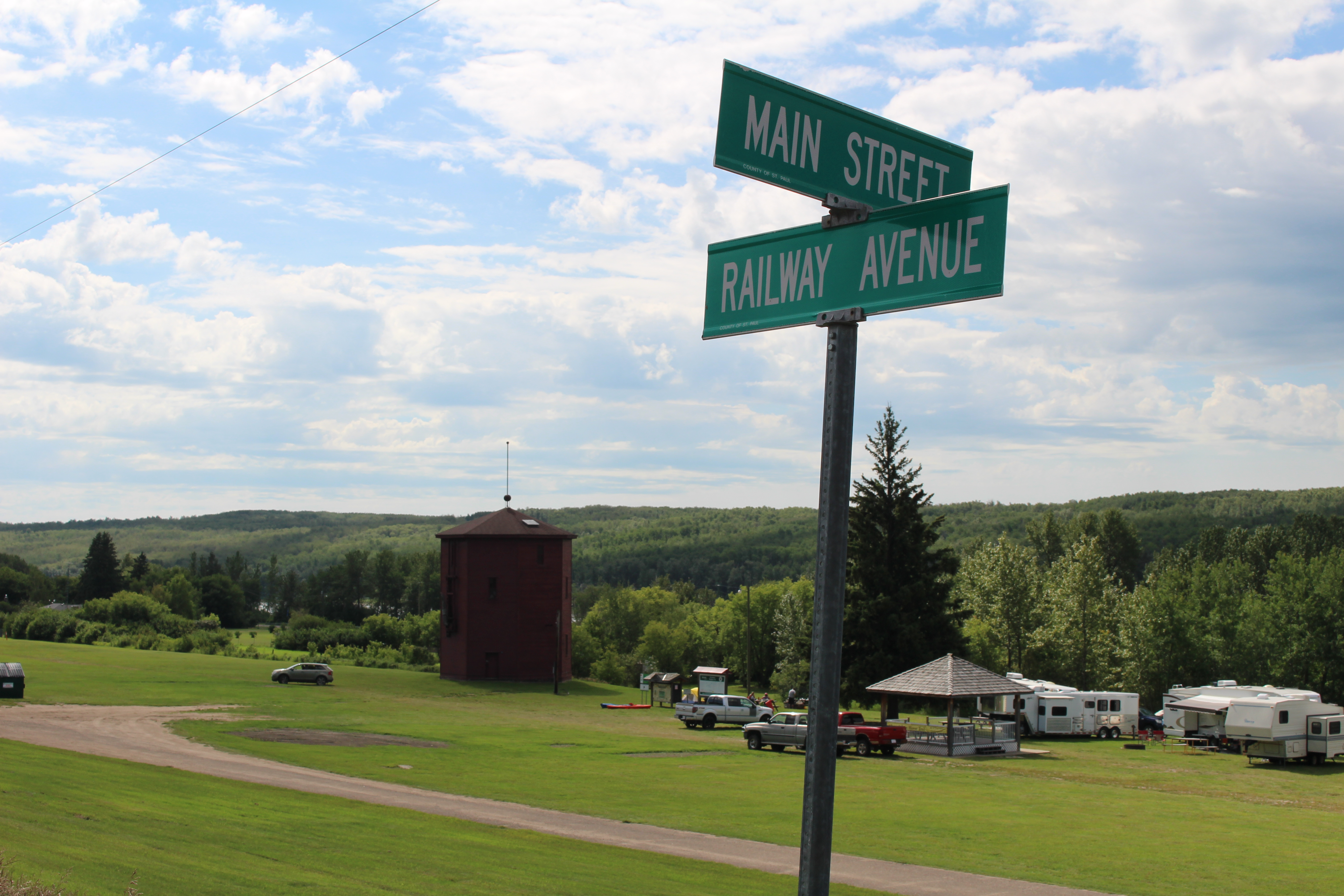
- View of the historic C.N.R. Water Tower in Heinsburg

- Location of Heinsburg Heinsburg (Canada)
- Coordinates: 53°46′03″N 110°31′18″W
- Country: Canada
- Province: Alberta
- Region: Central Alberta
- Census division: 12
- Municipal district: County of St. Paul No. 19

Government
  - Type: Unincorporated
  - Governing body: County of St. Paul No. 19 Council

Population (1991)
  - Total: 60
- Time zone: UTC−06:00 (Alberta Time)
- Area codes: 780, 587, 825

Heinsburg is a hamlet in central Alberta, Canada within the County of St. Paul No. 19. It is located approximately 21 kilometres (13 mi) north of Highway 45 and 66 kilometres (41 mi) northwest of Lloydminster.

John Heins, an early postmaster, gave the community his last name.

== Demographics ==
Heinsburg recorded a population of 60 in the 1991 Census of Population conducted by Statistics Canada.

== See also ==
- List of communities in Alberta
- List of hamlets in Alberta
