= St. Edouard, Alberta =

St. Edouard
- Hamlet
- Location of St. Edouard St. Edouard (Canada)
- Coordinates: 53°59′28″N 111°07′07″W
- Country: Canada
- Province: Alberta
- Region: Central Alberta
- Census division: 12
- Municipal district: County of St. Paul No. 19

Government
  - Type: Unincorporated
  - Governing body: County of St. Paul No. 19 Council

Population (1991)
  - Total: 33
- Time zone: UTC−06:00 (Alberta Time)
- Area codes: 780, 587, 825

St. Edouard is a hamlet in northern Alberta, Canada within the County of St. Paul No. 19. It is located 2 kilometres (1.2 mi) south of Highway 28, approximately 82 kilometres (51 mi) southwest of Cold Lake.

== Demographics ==
St. Edouard recorded a population of 33 in the 1991 Census of Population conducted by Statistics Canada.

== See also ==
- List of communities in Alberta
- List of hamlets in Alberta
