= Innisfree, Alberta =

Innisfree
- Village
- Village of Innisfree
- As photographed in 1980

- Location within Alberta
- Coordinates: 53°22′58″N 111°31′54″W
- Country: Canada
- Province: Alberta
- Region: Central Alberta
- Census Division: No. 10
- Municipal district: County of Minburn No. 27
- Incorporated
  - Village: March 11, 1911
- Named for: Innisfree island, Lough Gill, Ireland

Government
  - Mayor: Evan Raycraft
  - Governing body: Innisfree Village Council

Area (2021)
  - Land: 1 km^{2} (0.39 sq mi)
- Elevation: 680 m (2,230 ft)

Population (2021)
  - Total: 187
  - Density: 187.2/km^{2} (485/sq mi)
- Time zone: UTC−06:00 (Alberta Time)
- Highways: 16; 870
- Waterways: Birch Lake
- Website: Official website

Innisfree is a village in central Alberta, Canada. It is located 52 km west of Vermilion along the Yellowhead Highway. Innisfree is named for the island of Innisfree in Lough Gill, Ireland.

== Demographics ==
In the 2021 Census of Population conducted by Statistics Canada, the Village of Innisfree had a population of 187 living in 94 of its 124 total private dwellings, a change of −3.1% from its 2016 population of 193. With a land area of 1 km^{2} (0.39 sq mi), it had a population density of 187.0/km^{2} (484.3/sq mi) in 2021.

The population of the Village of Innisfree according to its 2017 municipal census is 223.

In the 2016 Census of Population conducted by Statistics Canada, the Village of Innisfree recorded a population of 193 living in 96 of its 126 total private dwellings, a −12.3% change from its 2011 population of 220. With a land area of 1.01 km^{2} (0.39 sq mi), it had a population density of 191.1/km^{2} (494.9/sq mi) in 2016.

== See also ==
- List of communities in Alberta
- List of francophone communities in Alberta
- List of villages in Alberta
