= Edgerton, Alberta =

Edgerton
- Village
- Village of Edgerton
- Location in Alberta
- Coordinates: 52.75935°N 110.46345°W
- Country: Canada
- Province: Alberta
- Region: Central Alberta
- Census division: 7
- Municipal district: Municipal District of Wainwright No. 61
- Incorporated
  - Village: September 11, 1917

Government
  - Mayor: Kaylan White
  - Governing body: Edgerton Village Council

Area (2021)
  - Land: 2.01 km^{2} (0.78 sq mi)
- Elevation: 650 m (2,130 ft)

Population (2021)
  - Total: 385
  - Density: 191.3/km^{2} (495/sq mi)
- Time zone: UTC−06:00 (Alberta Time)
- Postal code span: T0B 1K0
- Highways: Highway 894; Highway 610
- Waterway: Ribstone Creek
- Website: Official website

Edgerton is a village in central Alberta, Canada. it is located 35 kilometres (22 mi) east of Wainwright.

The village has the name of H. H. Edgerton, an official of the Grand Trunk Pacific Railway.

== Demographics ==
In the 2021 Census of Population conducted by Statistics Canada, the Village of Edgerton had a population of 385 living in 173 of its 197 total private dwellings, a change of 0.3% from its 2016 population of 384. With a land area of 2.01 km^{2} (0.78 sq mi), it had a population density of 191.5/km^{2} (496.1/sq mi) in 2021.

The population of the Village of Edgerton according to its 2017 municipal census is 425, a change of 6% from its 2012 municipal census population of 401.

In the 2016 Census of Population conducted by Statistics Canada, the Village of Edgerton recorded a population of 384 living in 177 of its 192 total private dwellings, a 21.1% change from its 2011 population of 317. With a land area of 2.04 km^{2} (0.79 sq mi), it had a population density of 188.2/km^{2} (487.5/sq mi) in 2016.

== Education ==
There is one school in Edgerton covering K–12. Edgerton Public School is one of 20 that come under the responsibility and direction of the Buffalo Trail Regional School Division.

== See also ==
- List of communities in Alberta
- List of villages in Alberta
