= Gene Achtymichuk =

Canadian ice hockey player (1932–2024)

- Born: September 7, 1932; Lamont, Alberta, Canada
- Died: June 28, 2024 (aged 91)
- Height: 5 ft 11 in (180 cm)
- Weight: 170 lb (77 kg; 12 st 2 lb)
- Position: Centre
- Shot: Left
- Played for: Montreal Canadiens; Detroit Red Wings
- Playing career: 1952–1972

Eugene Edward Achtymichuk (September 7, 1932 – June 28, 2024) was a Canadian professional ice hockey centre. He played 32 games in the National Hockey League with the Montreal Canadiens and Detroit Red Wings between 1952 and 1959. The rest of his career, which lasted from 1952 to 1972, was spent in various minor leagues. Achtymichuk was born in Lamont, Alberta on September 7, 1932, and died on June 28, 2024, at the age of 91.

== Playing career ==
Gene Achtymichuk played a total of 32 NHL games spanned over almost a decade. He began his career by playing one game for the Montreal Canadiens in 1951–52. Five years later, in 1956–57, he played another three games for the Canadiens. The following season saw Gene achieve a career-high 16 games played. This is also the season that he scored all of his three career goals and eight career points. The next season, his last NHL season, he played 12 games for the Detroit Red Wings.

While Achtymichuk was not playing at the NHL level, he was playing in various other minor leagues.

== Career statistics ==
=== Regular season and playoffs ===
			Regular season					Playoffs
Season	Team	League	GP	G	A	Pts	PIM	GP	G	A	Pts	PIM
1949–50	Edmonton Canadians	WJRHL	40	27	16	43	2	—	—	—	—	—
1949–50	Crowsnest Pass Timberwolves	WCJHL	—	—	—	—	—	—	—	—	—	—
1950–51	Crowsnest Pass Timberwolves	WCJHL	40	37	27	64	22	14	10	17	27	4
1951–52	Montreal Canadiens	NHL	1	0	0	0	0	—	—	—	—	—
1951–52	Crowsnest Pass Timberwolves	WCJHL	44	53	33	86	63	—	—	—	—	—
1952–53	Buffalo Bisons	AHL	50	7	4	11	18	—	—	—	—	—
1953–54	Victoria Cougars	WHL	65	11	21	32	25	5	1	0	1	0
1954–55	Victoria Cougars	WHL	69	18	19	37	18	5	0	1	1	2
1955–56	Quebec Aces	QSHL	64	22	28	50	34	7	0	5	5	2
1956–57	Montreal Canadiens	NHL	3	0	0	0	0	—	—	—	—	—
1956–57	Quebec Aces	QSHL	62	16	41	57	40	10	2	4	6	4
1957–58	Montreal Canadiens	NHL	16	3	5	8	2	—	—	—	—	—
1957–58	Montreal Royals	QSHL	54	14	38	52	28	—	—	—	—	—
1958–59	Detroit Red Wings	NHL	12	0	0	0	0	—	—	—	—	—
1958–59	Edmonton Flyers	WHL	39	16	17	33	30	3	0	1	1	6
1959–60	Edmonton Flyers	WHL	67	20	51	71	44	4	1	3	4	4
1960–61	Edmonton Flyers	WHL	25	6	14	20	2	—	—	—	—	—
1960–61	Sudbury Wolves	EPHL	37	5	28	33	16	—	—	—	—	—
1961–62	Portland Buckaroos	WHL	68	17	56	73	10	3	0	0	0	0
1962–63	Knoxville Knights	EHL	68	30	96	126	29	5	1	5	6	4
1963–64	Knoxville Knights	EHL	72	30	88	118	42	8	4	4	8	4
1964–65	Long Island Ducks	EHL	71	30	83	113	26	15	3	9	12	8
1965–66	Long Island Ducks	EHL	72	34	83	117	62	12	6	10	16	8
1965–66	Portland Buckaroos	WHL	—	—	—	—	—	2	0	0	0	0
1966–67	Long Island Ducks	EHL	71	13	45	58	82	3	0	0	0	2
1967–68	Long Island Ducks	EHL	35	6	12	18	24	—	—	—	—	—
1968–69	Edmonton Monarchs	ASHL	30	9	9	18	11	8	1	5	6	2
1969–70	Edmonton Monarchs	ASHL	—	—	—	—	—	—	—	—	—	—
1970–71	Edmonton Monarchs	ASHL	—	—	—	—	—	—	—	—	—	—
1971–72	Edmonton Monarchs	ASHL	—	—	—	—	—	—	—	—	—	—
EHL totals			389	143	407	550	265	43	14	28	42	26
WHL totals			333	88	178	266	129	22	2	5	7	12
NHL totals			32	3	5	8	2	—	—	—	—	—
