= Duverney =

Duverney is a French toponymic surname. Notable people with the surname include:

- Emmanuel-Maurice Duverney (1688–1761), French doctor and anatomist, son of Guichard Joseph Duverney
- Guichard Joseph Duverney or Joseph-Guichard Du Verney (1648–1730), French anatomist
- Jacques-François-Marie Duverney (1661–1748), French doctor and anatomist, brother of Guichard Joseph Duverney
- Joseph Paris Duverney (1684–1770), French banker
- Pierre Duverney (1653–1728), French surgeon, brother of Guichard Joseph Duverney

== See also ==
- Duvernay (disambiguation)
