= Foisy, Alberta =

Coordinates: 53°53′24″N 111°35′15″W

Location of Foisy Alberta

Foisy is an unincorporated community in northern Alberta in the County of St. Paul No. 19, located on Highway 36, 123 kilometres (76 mi) northwest of Lloydminster and is notable for the Foisy General Store.

Aladin Foisy, an early postmaster, gave the community his last name.
