= Horseshoe Bay, Alberta =

Horseshoe Bay
- Summer village
- Summer Village of Horseshoe Bay
- Location of Horseshoe Bay in Alberta
- Coordinates: 54.12226°N 111.36412°W
- Country: Canada
- Province: Alberta
- Census division: No. 12

Government
  - Type: Municipal incorporation
  - Mayor: Gary Burns
  - Governing body: Horseshoe Bay Summer Village Council

Area (2021)
  - Land: 0.98 km^{2} (0.38 sq mi)

Population (2021)
  - Total: 81
  - Density: 83.1/km^{2} (215/sq mi)
- Time zone: UTC−06:00 (Alberta Time)
- Website: Official website

Horseshoe Bay is a summer village in Alberta, Canada. It is located on the northern shore of Vincent Lake, in the County of St. Paul No. 19.

== Demographics ==
In the 2021 Census of Population conducted by Statistics Canada, the Summer Village of Horseshoe Bay had a population of 81 living in 41 of its 105 total private dwellings, a change of 65.3% from its 2016 population of 49. With a land area of 0.98 km^{2} (0.38 sq mi), it had a population density of 82.7/km^{2} (214.1/sq mi) in 2021.

The population of the Summer Village of Horseshoe bay according to its 2017 municipal census is 73.

In the 2016 Census of Population conducted by Statistics Canada, the Summer Village of Horseshoe Bay had a population of 49 living in 25 of its 88 total private dwellings, a 32.4% change from its 2011 population of 37. With a land area of 1.14 km^{2} (0.44 sq mi), it had a population density of 43.0/km^{2} (111.3/sq mi) in 2016.

== See also ==
- List of communities in Alberta
- List of francophone communities in Alberta
- List of summer villages in Alberta
- List of resort villages in Saskatchewan
