= Lafond, Alberta =

Lafond
- Hamlet
- Location of Lafond Lafond (Canada)
- Coordinates: 53°53′22″N 111°27′58″W
- Country: Canada
- Province: Alberta
- Region: Central Alberta
- Census division: 12
- Municipal district: County of St. Paul No. 19

Government
  - Type: Unincorporated
  - Governing body: County of St. Paul No. 19 Council

Population (1991)
  - Total: 35
- Time zone: UTC−06:00 (Alberta Time)
- Area codes: 780, 587, 825

Lafond is a hamlet in northern Alberta, Canada within the County of St. Paul No. 19. It is located 5 kilometres (3.1 mi) east of Highway 36, approximately 117 kilometres (73 mi) northwest of Lloydminster.

== Demographics ==
Lafond recorded a population of 35 in the 1991 Census of Population conducted by Statistics Canada.

== See also ==
- List of communities in Alberta
- List of hamlets in Alberta
