= Duvernay, Alberta =

Duvernay
- Hamlet
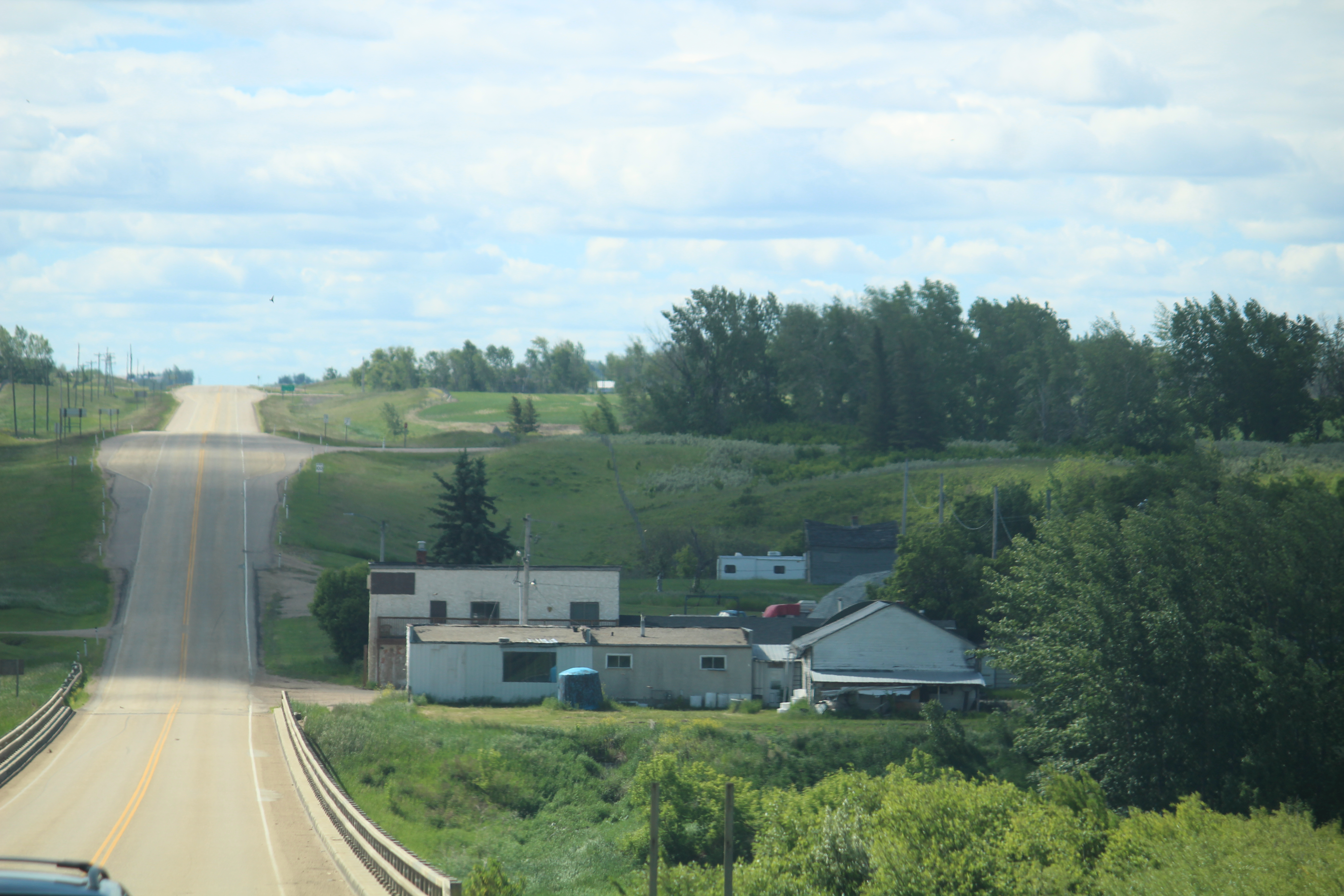

- Location of Duvernay Duvernay (Canada)
- Coordinates: 53°47′10″N 111°41′33″W
- Country: Canada
- Province: Alberta
- Region: Central Alberta
- Census division: 10
- Municipal district: County of Two Hills No. 21

Government
  - Type: Unincorporated
  - Governing body: County of Two Hills No. 21 Council

Population (1991)
  - Total: 26
- Time zone: UTC−06:00 (Alberta Time)
- Area codes: 780, 587, 825

Duvernay is a hamlet in central Alberta, Canada within the County of Two Hills No. 21. It is located 1.6 km (1.0 mi) north of the intersection of Highway 36 and Highway 29 along the south bank of the North Saskatchewan River, approximately 53 km (33 mi) southwest of St. Paul. The hamlet of Brosseau is located immediately across the river along the north bank.

The hamlet has the name of Ludger Duvernay. The Duvernay Formation, a stratigraphical unit of the Western Canadian Sedimentary Basin was named for the hamlet.

== Demographics ==
Duvernay recorded a population of 26 in the 1991 Census of Population conducted by Statistics Canada.

== See also ==
- List of communities in Alberta
- List of hamlets in Alberta
