= 2017 Alberta municipal censuses =

← 2016	April 1 – June 30, 2017	2018 →
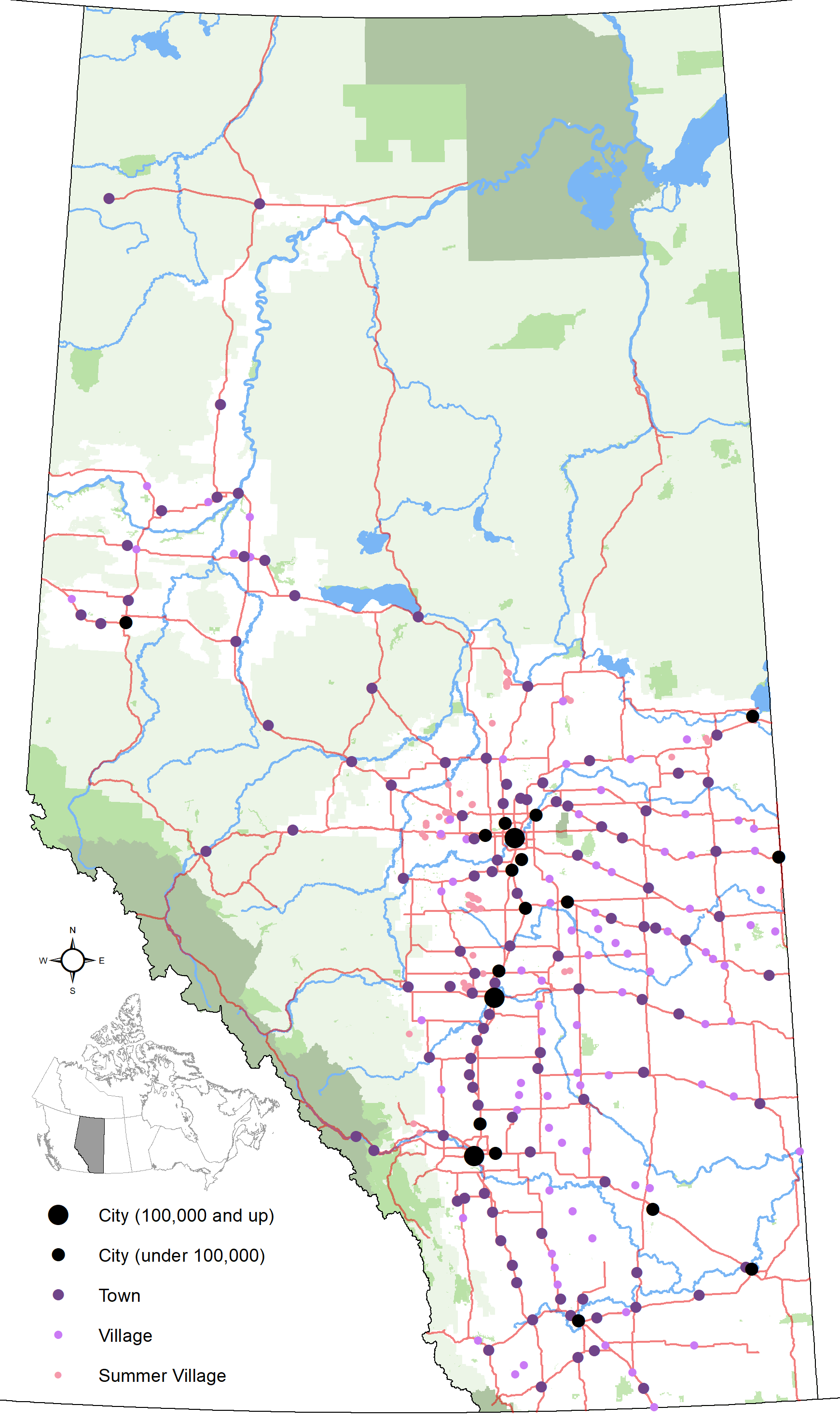
- Distribution of Alberta's 269 urban municipalities

Alberta has provincial legislation allowing its municipalities to conduct municipal censuses between April 1 and June 30 inclusive. Municipalities choose to conduct their own censuses for multiple reasons such as to better inform municipal service planning and provision, to capitalize on per capita based grant funding from higher levels of government, or to simply update their populations since the last federal census.

Alberta began the year of 2017 with 354 municipalities. Of these, 35 (9.9%) conducted a municipal census in 2017. Alberta Municipal Affairs recognized those conducted by 34 of these municipalities. By municipal status, it recognized those conducted by 7 of Alberta's 18 cities, 16 of 107 towns, 10 of 87 villages, 1 of its 51 summer villages, and 1 of 64 municipal districts. (Note: No censuses were conducted among Alberta's 5 specialized municipalities, 3 special areas and 8 improvement districts.)

Some municipalities achieved population milestones as a result of their 2017 censuses. Fort Saskatchewan exceeded 25,000 residents, while Chestermere surpassed 20,000 people and Crossfield grew beyond the 3,000 mark for the first time.

== Municipal census results ==
The following summarizes the results of the numerous municipal censuses conducted in 2017.

2017 municipal census summary				2016 federal census comparison				Previous municipal census comparison			
Municipality	Status	Census date	2017 pop.	2016 pop.	Absolute growth	Absolute change	Annual growth rate	Prev. pop.	Prev. census year	Absolute growth	Annual growth rate
Airdrie	City	April 1, 2017	64,922	61,581	3,341	5.4%	5.4%	61,842	2016	3,080	5.0%
Banff	Town	June 12, 2017	8,875	7,851	1,024	13%	13.0%	8,421	2014	454	1.8%
Beaumont	Town	April 15, 2017	18,320	17,396	924	5.3%	5.3%	17,720	2016	600	3.4%
Big Valley	Village	May 1, 2017	349	346	3	0.9%	0.9%	347	2015	2	0.3%
Blackfalds	Town	May 15, 2017	9,916	9,328	588	6.3%	6.3%	9,510	2016	406	4.3%
Bonnyville	Town	April 1, 2017	6,422	5,975	447	7.5%	7.5%	6,921	2014	−499	−2.5%
Bow Island	Town	April 1, 2017	2,043	1,983	60	3%	3.0%	1,868	2007	175	0.9%
Calgary	City	April 1, 2017	1,246,337	1,239,220	7,117	0.6%	0.6%	1,235,171	2016	11,166	0.9%
Carbon	Village	May 1, 2017	500	454	46	10.1%	10.1%	501	2000	−1	0.0%
Carmangay	Village	May 19, 2017	250	242	8	3.3%	3.3%	262	2013	−12	−1.2%
Chestermere	City	May 1, 2017	20,331	19,887	444	2.2%	2.2%	19,715	2016	616	3.1%
Cochrane	Town	April 3, 2017	26,320	25,853	467	1.8%	1.8%	25,122	2016	1,198	4.8%
Crossfield	Town	May 8, 2017	3,055	2,983	72	2.4%	2.4%	2,918	2014	137	1.5%
Edgerton	Village	May 10, 2017	425	384	41	10.7%	10.7%	401	2012	24	1.2%
Empress	Village		160	135	25	18.5%	18.5%	254	1983	−94	−1.4%
Fort Saskatchewan	City	April 3, 2017	25,533	24,149	1,384	5.7%	5.7%	24,569	2016	964	3.9%
Girouxville	Village	May 1, 2017	289	219	70	32%	32.0%	315	1976	−26	−0.2%
High Level	Town	May 1, 2017	3,992	3,159	833	26.4%	26.4%	3,823	2015	169	2.2%
Horseshoe Bay	Summer village	May 1, 2017	73	49	24	49%	49.0%	46	2001	27	2.9%
Innisfree	Village	May 15, 2017	223	193	30	15.5%	15.5%	267	1977	−44	−0.4%
Leduc	City	April 1, 2017	31,130	29,993	1,137	3.8%	3.8%	30,498	2016	632	2.1%
Lethbridge	City	April 1, 2017	98,198	92,729	5,469	5.9%	5.9%	96,828	2016	1,370	1.4%
Magrath	Town	April 24, 2017	2,435	2,374	61	2.6%	2.6%	2,398	2015	37	0.8%
Marwayne	Village	May 15, 2017	606	564	42	7.4%	7.4%	667	2013	−61	−2.4%
McLennan	Town	May 1, 2017	791	701	90	12.8%	12.8%	957	1997	−166	−0.9%
Oyen	Town	June 5, 2017	1,022	1,001	21	2.1%	2.1%	1,006	2015	16	0.8%
Raymond	Town	April 10, 2017	4,037	3,708	329	8.9%	8.9%	4,202	2016	−165	−3.9%
Rosemary	Village		(Note: The Village of Rosemary indicated it was going to conduct a municipal census in 2017, though no completion of this census was reported by Alberta Municipal Affairs.)	396				421	2012		
Spruce Grove	City	April 5, 2017	34,881	34,066	815	2.4%	2.4%	33,640	2016	1,241	3.7%
St. Paul	Town	April 10, 2017	5,963	5,827	136	2.3%	2.3%	6,004	2014	−41	−0.2%
County of St. Paul No. 19	Municipal district	April 18, 2017	6,468	6,036	432	7.2%	7.2%	6,168	2012	300	1.0%
Stirling	Village	June 1, 2017	1,269	978	291	29.8%	29.8%	1,147	2013	122	2.6%
Thorsby	Town	April 1, 2017	1,015	985	30	3%	3.0%	1,025	2015	−10	−0.5%
Two Hills	Town	May 15, 2017	1,443	1,352	91	6.7%	6.7%	1,431	2012	12	0.2%
Vermilion	Town	April 1, 2017	4,150	4,084	66	1.6%	1.6%	4,545	2012	−395	−1.8%
Veteran	Village	May 29, 2017	239	207	32	15.5%	15.5%	318	1982	−79	−0.8%

== See also ==
- List of communities in Alberta
