= St. Vincent, Alberta =

St. Vincent
- Hamlet
- Location of St. Vincent St. Vincent (Canada)
- Coordinates: 54°09′13″N 111°16′41″W
- Country: Canada
- Province: Alberta
- Region: Central Alberta
- Census division: 12
- Municipal district: County of St. Paul No. 19

Government
  - Type: Unincorporated
  - Governing body: County of St. Paul No. 19 Council

Population (1991)
  - Total: 43
- Time zone: UTC−06:00 (Alberta Time)
- Area codes: 780, 587, 825

St. Vincent is a hamlet in northern Alberta, Canada within the County of St. Paul No. 19. It is located 3 kilometres (1.9 mi) south of Highway 28, approximately 79 kilometres (49 mi) southwest of Cold Lake.

St. Vincent is the subject of a lengthy profile on the Alberta Online Encyclopedia, as a case study of a Franco-Albertan settlement.

== Demographics ==
St. Vincent recorded a population of 43 in the 1991 Census of Population conducted by Statistics Canada.

== See also ==
- List of communities in Alberta
- List of hamlets in Alberta
