= Lamont, Alberta =

Settlement in Canada, incorporated 1910

Lamont
- Town
- Town of Lamont
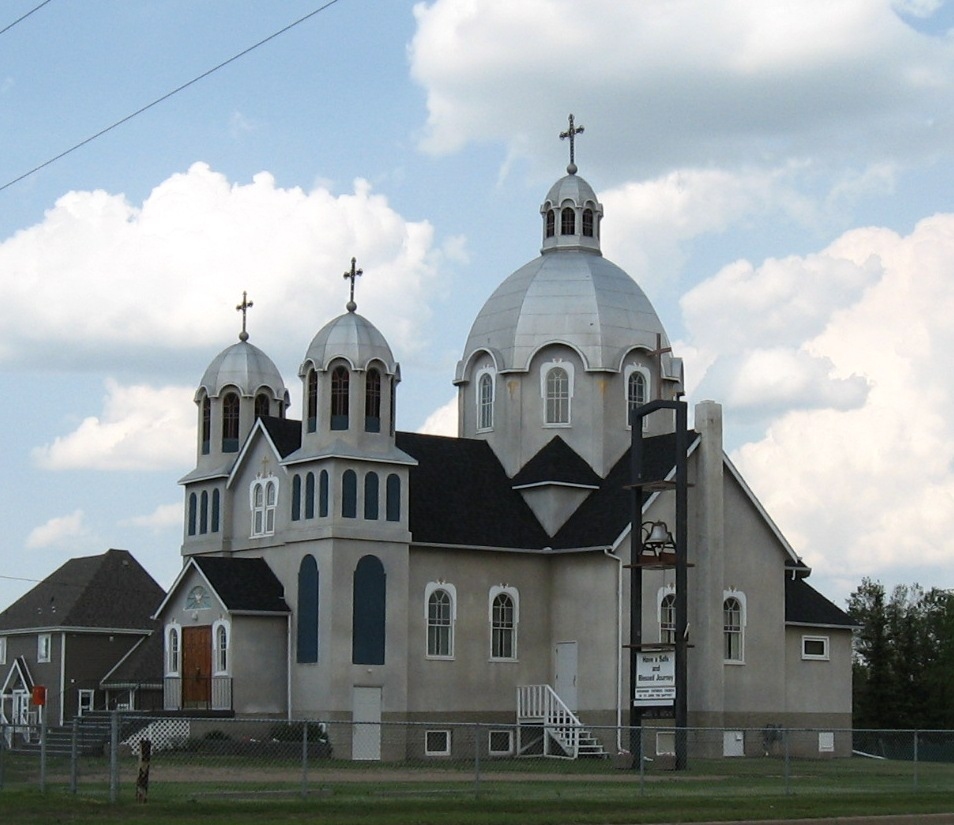
- Ukrainian Catholic Church in Lamont

- Location within Lamont County Location within Alberta
- Coordinates: 53°45′37″N 112°46′40″W
- Country: Canada
- Province: Alberta
- Region: Central Alberta
- Municipal district: Lamont County
- Post office: 1906
- Incorporated
  - Village: June 14, 1910
  - Town: May 31, 1968

Government
  - Mayor: Jody Foulds
  - Governing body: Lamont Town Council

Area (2021)
  - Land: 9.14 km^{2} (3.53 sq mi)
- Elevation: 653 m (2,142 ft)

Population (2021)
  - Total: 1,744
  - Density: 190.9/km^{2} (494/sq mi)
- Time zone: UTC−06:00 (Alberta Time)
- Area code: -1+780
- Highways: Highway 15; Highway 831; Highway 29
- Website: www.lamont.ca

Lamont is a town in central Alberta, Canada. It is located 60 kilometres (37 mi) east of Edmonton at the junction of Highway 15 and Highway 831.

== History ==
Settlement began in the 1880s. The area's location along the Victoria Trail, which was used by travellers between Edmonton and Winnipeg through most of the 1800s, aided the area's growing prosperity. This Victoria Trail was a road that ran south of the river, the so-called "plain [plains] trail." (A better known alternative route under the same name ran along the north bank and is now memorialized by the Victoria Trail in Edmonton.)

The town was named in honour of Canadian politician John Henderson Lamont.

Lamont was assigned a Royal Mail Canada post office in 1906, before being incorporated as a village in 1910.

The Lamont Hospital opened in 1912, serving the entire region.

On November 29, 1960, a school bus carrying students from nearby Chipman to school in Lamont was struck by a train, killing 17 students (15 girls and two boys). The collision occurred on the east side of town at a crossing just north of Highway 15 before 9:00 am.

== Demographics ==
In the 2021 Census of Population conducted by Statistics Canada, the Town of Lamont had a population of 1,744 living in 684 of its 743 total private dwellings, a change of −1.7% from its 2016 population of 1,774. With a land area of 9.14 km^{2} (3.53 sq mi), it had a population density of 190.8/km^{2} (494.2/sq mi) in 2021.

In the 2016 Census of Population conducted by Statistics Canada, the Town of Lamont recorded a population of 1,774 living in 664 of its 695 total private dwellings, a 1.2% change from its 2011 population of 1,753. With a land area of 9.2 km^{2} (3.6 sq mi), it had a population density of 192.8/km^{2} (499.4/sq mi) in 2016.

== Media ==
The Lamont Leader is a weekly newspaper that serves Lamont.

== Notable people ==
- Gene Achtymichuk (born 1932), professional hockey player
- Del Thachuk (1936-2018), professional football player
- Brian O'Kurley (born 1953), member of Canadian Parliament (1988–1993)
- Muriel Stanley Venne (1937), Indigenous women's rights advocate
- Ed Stelmach (born 1951), Premier of Alberta (2006–2011)

== See also ==
- List of communities in Alberta
- List of towns in Alberta
