= Ispas, Alberta =

Coordinates: 53.88346°N 111.80182°W

Ispas is a locality in Alberta, Canada.

The community was named after Ispas, Bukovina, the ancestral home of an early postmaster.
