= Saddle Lake, Alberta =

Coordinates: 53°58′06″N 111°41′31″W

Location of Saddle Lake, Alberta

Saddle Lake is a First Nations community in central Alberta. It is located on Saddle Lake Cree Nation 125 and is governed by the Saddle Lake Cree Nation.

The community is located on Highway 652, approximately 180 km (110 mi) northeast of the City of Edmonton, 26 km (16 mi) west of the Town of St. Paul and 105 km (65 mi) north of the Town of Vegreville.
