= Beauvallon, Alberta =

Beauvallon
- Hamlet
- Location of Beauvallon Beauvallon (Canada)
- Coordinates: 53°39′32″N 111°21′58″W
- Country: Canada
- Province: Alberta
- Region: Central Alberta
- Census division: 10
- Municipal district: County of Two Hills No. 21

Government
  - Type: Unincorporated
  - Governing body: County of Two Hills No. 21 Council

Population (1991)
  - Total: 7
- Time zone: UTC−06:00 (Alberta Time)
- Area codes: 780, 587, 825

Beauvallon is a hamlet in central Alberta, Canada within the County of Two Hills No. 21. It is located on Highway 45, approximately 139 kilometres (86 mi) east of Edmonton.

Beauvallon is a name derived from French meaning "beautiful vale".

== Demographics ==
Population history of Beauvallon
Year	Pop.	±%
1941	78	—
1951	84	+7.7%
1956	96	+14.3%
1961	71	−26.0%
1966	70	−1.4%
1971	57	−18.6%
1976	37	−35.1%
1981	46	+24.3%
1986	18	−60.9%
1991	7	−61.1%
Source: Statistics Canada

Beauvallon recorded a population of 7 in the 1991 Census of Population conducted by Statistics Canada.

== See also ==
- List of communities in Alberta
- List of hamlets in Alberta
