= County of Two Hills No. 21 =

Municipal district in Alberta, Canada

- Municipal district

- Location within Alberta
- Coordinates: 53°42′54″N 111°44′46″W
- Country: Canada
- Province: Alberta
- Region: Central Alberta
- Census division: 10
- Established: 1963
- Incorporated: 1963

Government
  - Reeve: Don Gulayec
  - Governing body: County of Two Hills Council
  - Administrative office: Two Hills

Area (2021)
  - Land: 2,600.15 km^{2} (1,003.92 sq mi)

Population (2021)
  - Total: 3,412
  - Density: 1.3/km^{2} (3.4/sq mi)
- Time zone: UTC−06:00 (Alberta Time)
- Website: thcounty.ab.ca

The County of Two Hills No. 21 is a municipal district in east-central Alberta, Canada. Located in Census Division No. 10, its municipal office is located in the Town of Two Hills.

The County's flag depicts an outline of the region, with a wheat bushel, cow, and oil derrick alongside the county's name and the seal of Alberta.

== History ==
The County of Two Hills No. 21 was formed in 1963 through the amalgamation of the Municipal District of Eagle No. 81 and the Two Hills School Division.

== Geography ==
=== Communities and localities ===
The following urban municipalities are surrounded by the County of Two Hills No. 21.

Cities

- none

Towns

- Two Hills

Villages

- Myrnam

Summer villages

- none

The following hamlets are located within the County of Two Hills No. 21.

Hamlets

- Beauvallon
- Brosseau
- Derwent (dissolved from village status on September 1, 2010)
- Duvernay
- Hairy Hill (dissolved from village status in 1996)
- Morecambe
- Musidora
- Willingdon (dissolved from village status on September 1, 2017)

The following localities are located within the County of Two Hills No. 21.

Localities

- Boian
- Desjarlais
- Ispas
- Kaleland
- Maughan
- Norma
- Pathfinder
- Plain Lake
- Raychuk Subdivision
- Rusylvia
- Shalka
- Shepenge
- Slawa
- Soda Lake
- Stubno

== Demographics ==
In the 2021 Census of Population conducted by Statistics Canada, the County of Two Hills No. 21 had a population of 3,412 living in 1,148 of its 1,590 total private dwellings, a change of −6.3% from its 2016 population of 3,641. With a land area of 2,600.15 km^{2} (1,003.92 sq mi), it had a population density of 1.3/km^{2} (3.4/sq mi) in 2021.

In the 2016 Census of Population conducted by Statistics Canada, the County of Two Hills No. 21 had a population of 3,322 living in 1,105 of its 1,499 total private dwellings, a 5.1% change from its 2011 population of 3,160. With a land area of 2,637.18 km^{2} (1,018.22 sq mi), it had a population density of 1.3/km^{2} (3.3/sq mi) in 2016.

== See also ==
- List of communities in Alberta
- List of municipal districts in Alberta
