= County of St. Paul No. 19 =

Municipal district in Alberta, Canada

- Municipal district
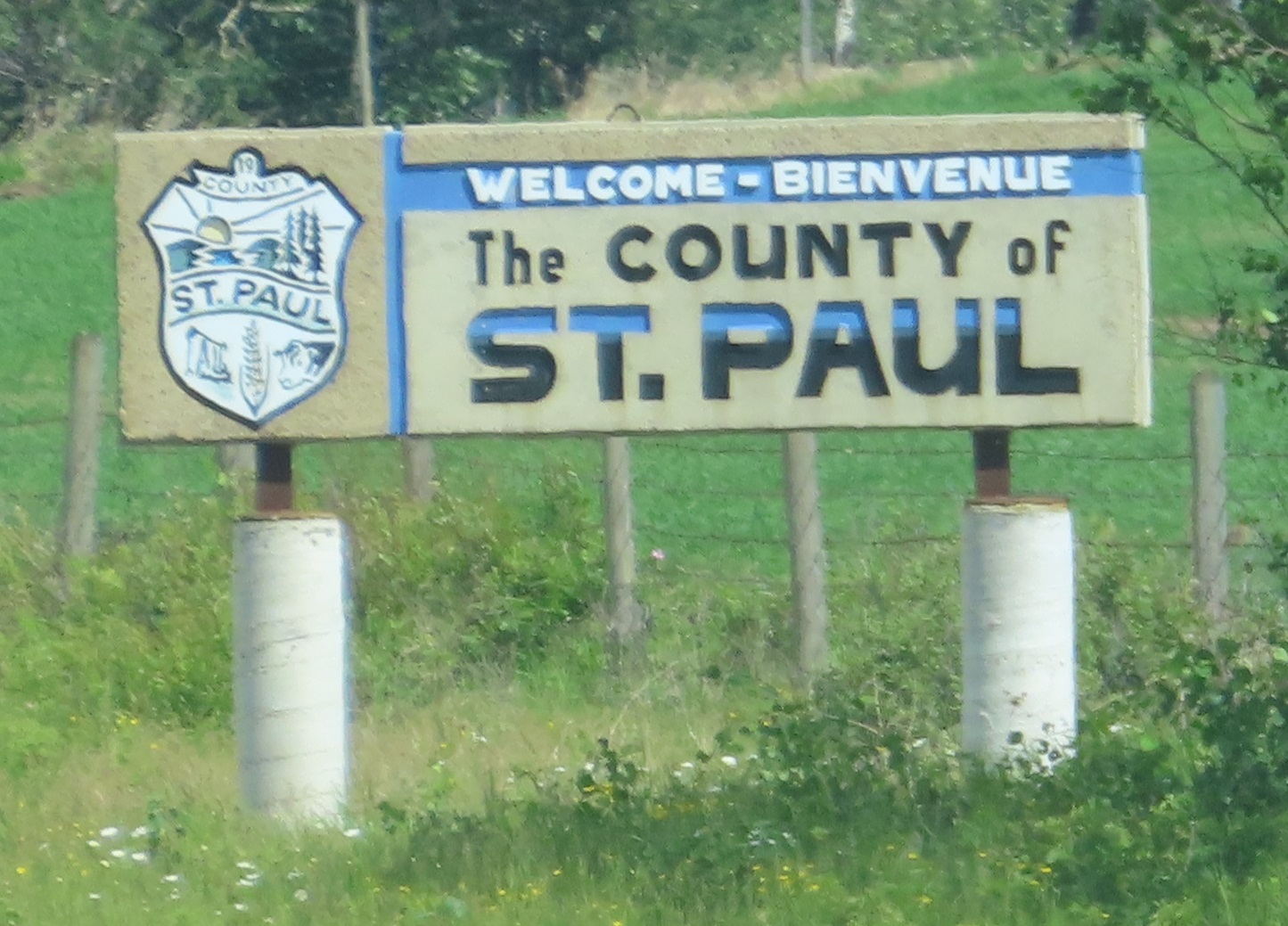
- Welcome sign

- Location within Alberta
- Country: Canada
- Province: Alberta
- Region: Northern Alberta
- Census division: 12
- Established: 1942
- Incorporated: 1962 (County)

Government
  - Reeve: Glen Ockerman
  - Governing body: County of St. Paul Council
  - Administrative office: St. Paul

Area (2021)
  - Land: 3,280.4 km^{2} (1,266.6 sq mi)

Population (2021)
  - Total: 6,306
  - Density: 1.9/km^{2} (4.9/sq mi)
- Time zone: UTC−06:00 (Alberta Time)
- Website: county.stpaul.ab.ca

The County of St. Paul No. 19 is a municipal district in eastern Northern Alberta, Canada. Located in Census Division No. 12, its municipal office is located in the Town of St. Paul.

== History ==
It was previously known as the Municipal District of St. Paul No. 86 until January 1, 1962, when it became the County of St. Paul No. 19.

== Geography ==
=== Communities and localities ===
The following urban municipalities are surrounded by the County of St. Paul No. 19.

Cities

- none

Towns

- Elk Point
- St. Paul

Villages

- none

Summer villages

- Horseshoe Bay

The following hamlets are located within the County of St. Paul No. 19.

Hamlets

- Ashmont
- Heinsburg
- Lafond
- Lindbergh
- Lottie Lake
- Mallaig
- Riverview
- St. Edouard
- St. Lina
- St. Vincent

The following localities are located within the County of St. Paul No. 19.

Localities

- Abilene
- Angle Lake
- Armistice
- Bayview Beach
- Bellevue Subdivision
- Boscombe
- Boyne Lake
- Cameron Cove
- Clarksville
- Cork
- Crestview Beach
- Edouardville
- Ferguson Flats
- Floating Stone
- Foisy
- Frog Lake
- Glen Haven
- Glen On The Lake
- Gratz
- Hillside Estates
- Lac Bellevue
- Lac Canard
- Lac St. Cyr
- Lake Eliza
- Linkewich Trailer Court

- Lower Therien Lake
- McLeod Beach
- McRae
- Middle Creek
- Muriel
- Northern Valley
- Norway Valley
- Owlseye
- Owlseye Lake
- Pine Meadow
- Plateau Estates
- Pratch Subdivision
- Primrose
- Primula
- Riel
- Springpark
- St. Brides
- St. Paul Beach
- Stony Lake
- Sugden
- Sunset Beach
- Terence View Estates
- Whitney Lake Mobile Home Park

== Demographics ==
In the 2021 Census of Population conducted by Statistics Canada, the County of St. Paul No. 19 had a population of 6,306 living in 2,491 of its 3,764 total private dwellings, a change of 4.5% from its 2016 population of 6,036. With a land area of 3,280.4 km^{2} (1,266.6 sq mi), it had a population density of 1.9/km^{2} (5.0/sq mi) in 2021.

The population of the County of St. Paul No. 19 according to its 2017 municipal census is 6,468, a change of 4.9% from its 2012 municipal census population of 6,168.

In the 2016 Census of Population conducted by Statistics Canada, the County of St. Paul No. 19 had a population of 6,036 living in 2,334 of its 3,562 total private dwellings, a 3.6% change from its 2011 population of 5,826. With a land area of 3,309.44 km^{2} (1,277.78 sq mi), it had a population density of 1.8/km^{2} (4.7/sq mi) in 2016.

== See also ==
- List of communities in Alberta
- List of francophone communities in Alberta
- List of municipal districts in Alberta
