= Two Hills, Alberta =

Two Hills
- Town
- Town of Two Hills
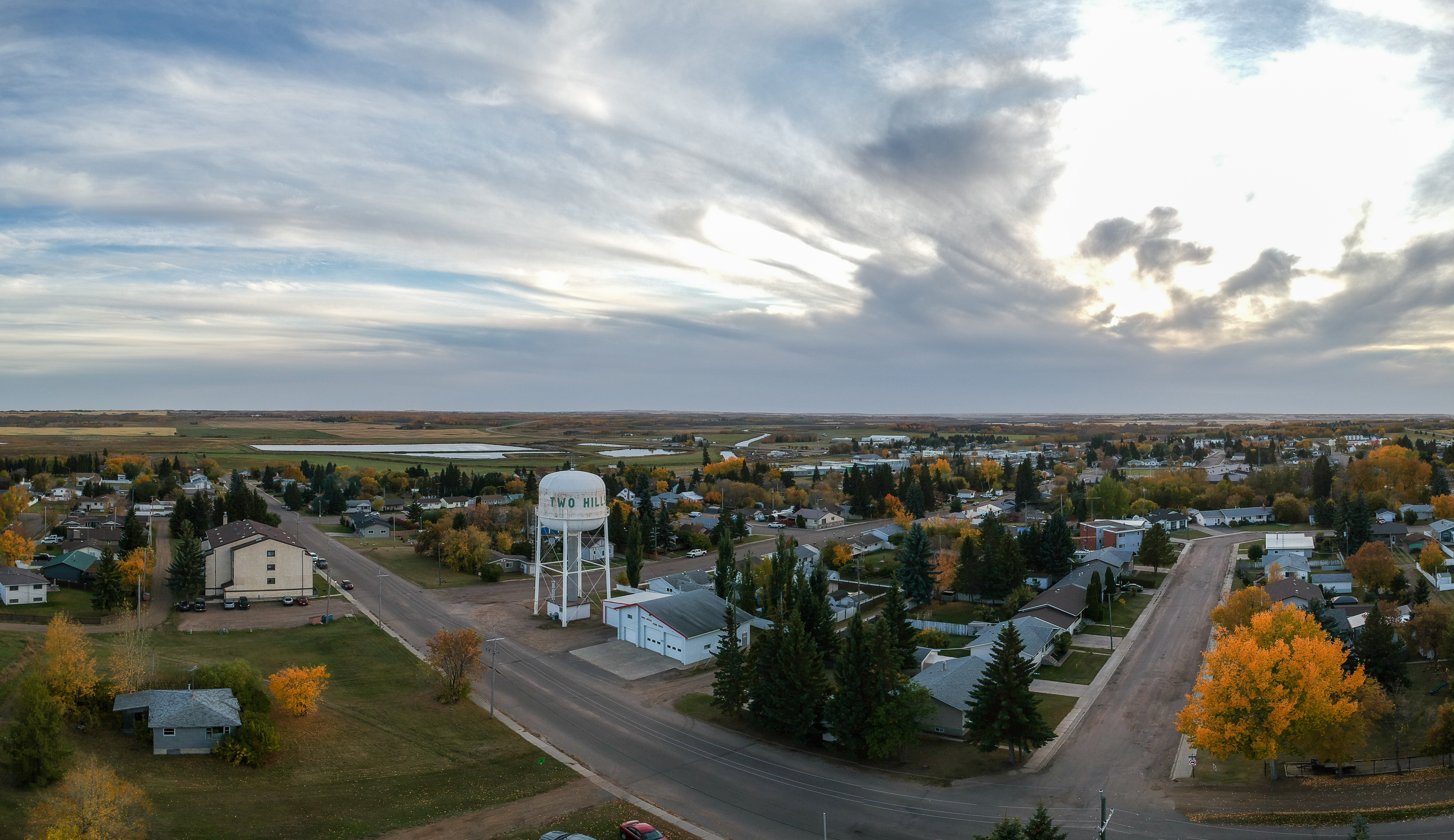
- Motto: Small Town With A Big Future
- Location of Two Hills in Alberta
- Coordinates: 53°42′54″N 111°44′46″W
- Country: Canada
- Province: Alberta
- Region: Central Alberta
- Census division: 10
- Municipal district: County of Two Hills No. 21
- Incorporated
  - Village: June 4, 1929
  - Town: January 1, 1955

Government
  - Mayor: Leonard L. Ewanishan
  - Governing body: Two Hills Town Council

Area (2021)
  - Land: 3.11 km^{2} (1.20 sq mi)
- Elevation: 603 m (1,978 ft)

Population (2021)
  - Total: 1,416
  - Density: 454.7/km^{2} (1,178/sq mi)
- Time zone: UTC−06:00 (Alberta Time)
- Postal code span: T0B 4K0
- Area code: +1-780
- Highways: Highway 36; Highway 45
- Waterway: Vermilion River
- Website: Official website

Two Hills is a town in central Alberta, Canada. It is approximately 137 km (85 mi) east of Edmonton at the junction of Highway 45 and Highway 36. Two Hills is primarily an agriculture-based community. It was named from the presence of two hills located near the town. Post office established in 1914.

== Demographics ==
In the 2021 Census of Population conducted by Statistics Canada, the Town of Two Hills had a population of 1,416 living in 445 of its 527 total private dwellings, a change of 4.7% from its 2016 population of 1,352. With a land area of 3.11 km^{2} (1.20 sq mi), it had a population density of 455.3/km^{2} (1,179.2/sq mi) in 2021.

The population of the Town of Two Hills according to its 2017 municipal census is 1,443, a change of 0.8% from its 2012 municipal census population of 1,431.

In the 2016 Census of Population conducted by Statistics Canada, the Town of Two Hills recorded a population of 1,352 living in 399 of its 478 total private dwellings, a −2% change from its 2011 population of 1,379. With a land area of 3.38 km^{2} (1.31 sq mi), it had a population density of 400.0/km^{2} (1,036.0/sq mi) in 2016.

== See also ==
- List of communities in Alberta
- List of towns in Alberta
