= St. Paul, Alberta =

Saint-Paul Saint-Paul-des-Métis (1909–1936)
- Town
- Town of St. Paul
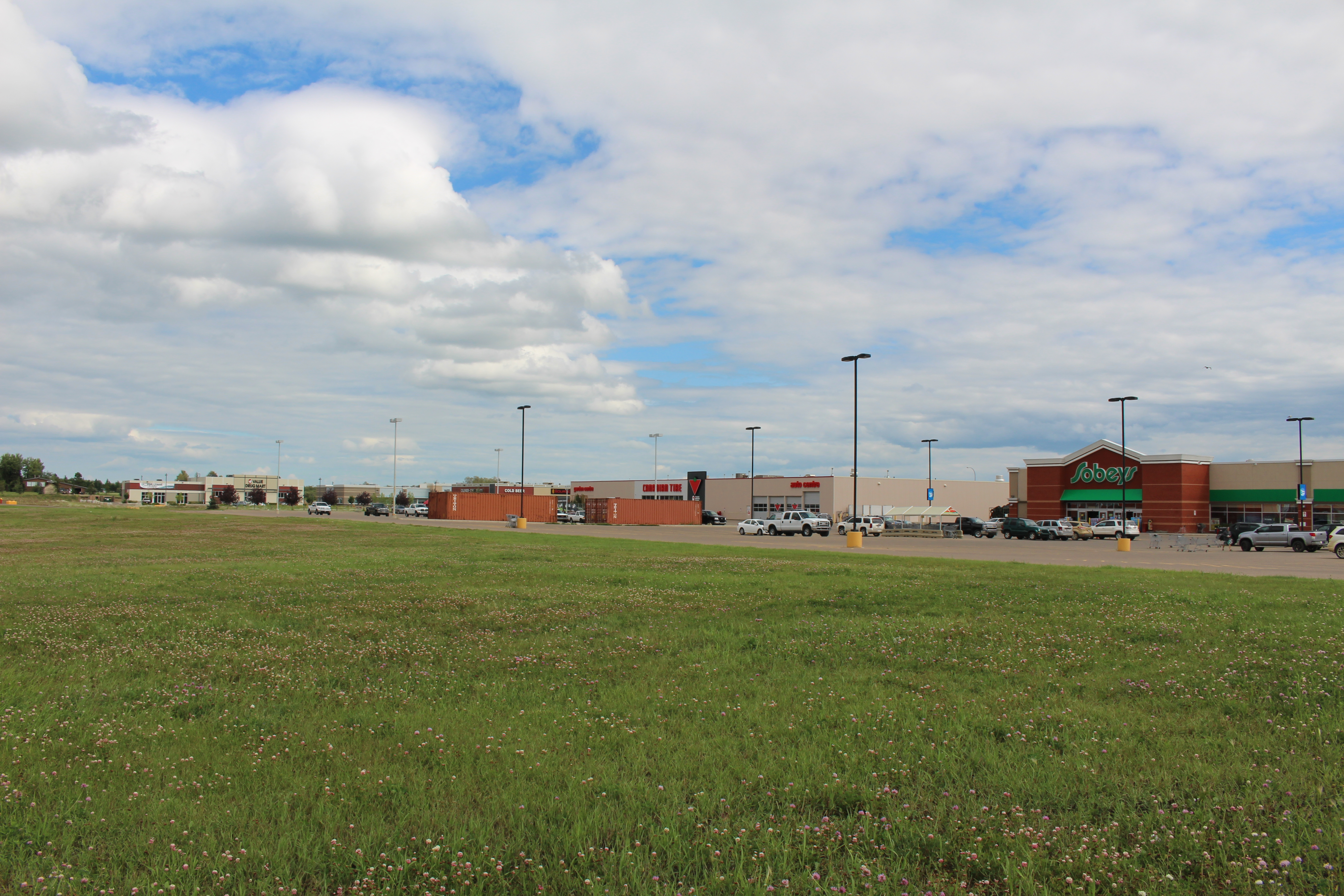
- St. Paul on 40 Street south of 50th Avenue

- Logo

- Location within Alberta
- Coordinates: 53°59′34″N 111°17′50″W
- Country: Canada
- Province: Alberta
- Region: Northern Alberta
- Census division: 12
- Municipal district: County of St. Paul No. 19
- Founded: 1896
- Incorporated
  - Village: June 14, 1912 (as St. Paul de Metis)
  - Town: December 15, 1936

Government
  - Mayor: Glenn Andersen
  - Governing body: St. Paul Town Council

Area (2021)
  - Land: 8.64 km^{2} (3.34 sq mi)
- Elevation: 646 m (2,119 ft)

Population (2021)
  - Total: 5,863
  - Density: 678.7/km^{2} (1,758/sq mi)
- Time zone: UTC−06:00 (Alberta Time)
- Postal code span: T0A 3A0 & T0A 4A0
- Area codes: +1-780, +1-587
- Highways: Highway 29; Highway 881
- Website: www.stpaul.ca

St. Paul, originally known as St-Paul-de-Métis or St-Paul-des-Métis, is a town in East-Northern Alberta, Canada that is surrounded by the County of St. Paul No. 19. It was known as St. Paul de(s) Métis between 1912 and 1936.

The community of St-Paul-de-Métis has historical significance related to the Métis people in the region. The area was settled by Métis families who played a vital role in the fur trade and the early development of the region. The Métis, with their mixed Indigenous and European ancestry, established themselves in the area and contributed to its cultural heritage.

The community takes its name from the Catholic mission and parish established in the late 19th century. The parish was dedicated to Saint Paul the Apostle and became a focal point for religious, social, and cultural activities for the local Métis population.

== History ==
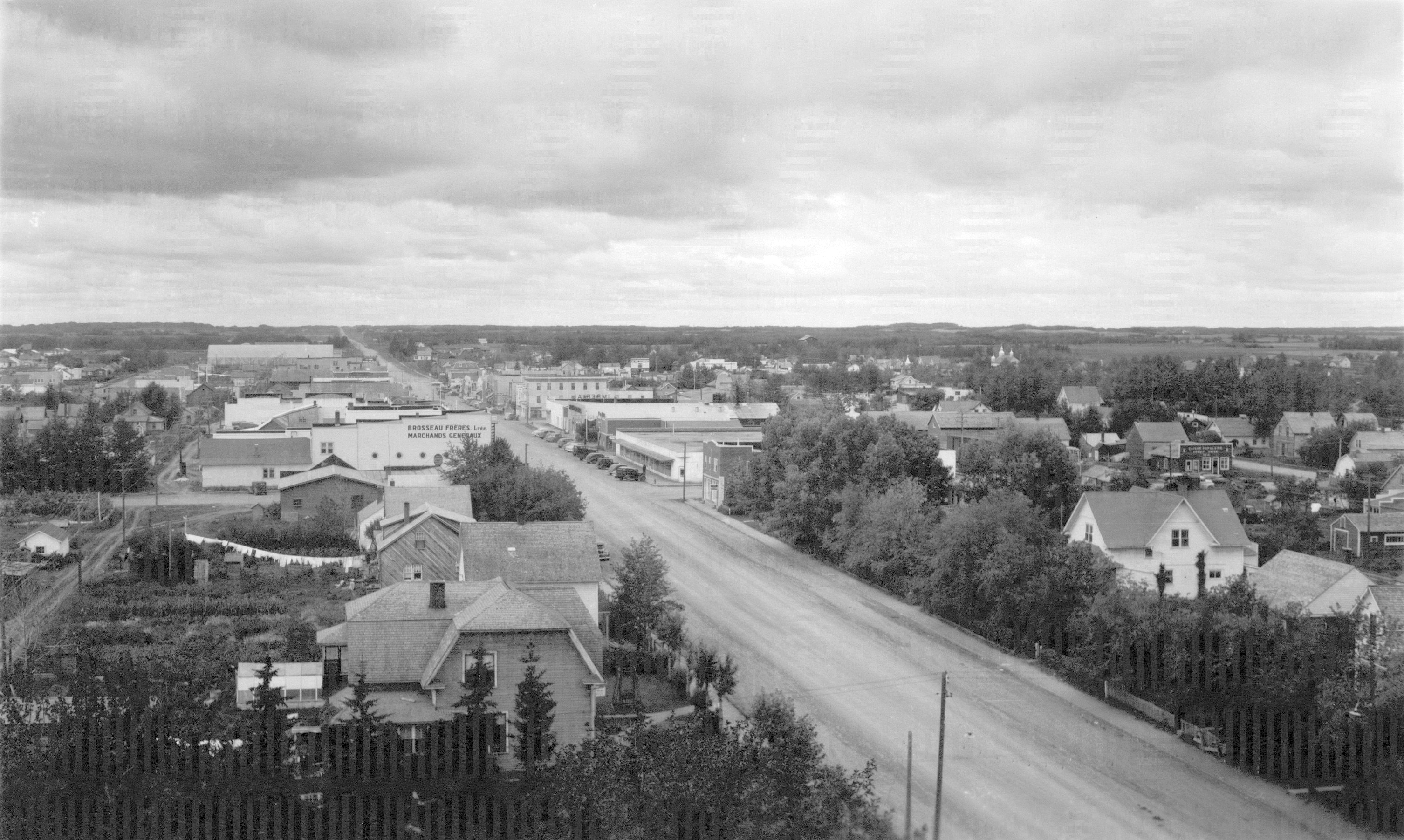
St. Paul, circa 1930

The community was founded as a Métis colony in 1896 after missionary Albert Lacombe petitioned the Canadian government for a land grant reserved for the Métis people to farm. The colony was founded as Saint-Paul-des-Métis on four townships of federal government property which was leased for 99 years at a rate of $1 per year. Each Métis family which settled in the area received 80 acres of land, livestock, farming equipment and access to collective land, and soon after a chapel, boarding school, sawmill and windmill were constructed in the colony. The colony experienced significant hardships due to storms and a fire in 1905 which resulted in the colony's failure and termination of the government lease in 1908. One of the original structures of the colony, the Old St. Paul Rectory, a mission site built as the administrative centre for the Oblate priests remains standing today, and is designated an Alberta Provincial Historical Resource.

Following the failure of the Métis colony the area was opened up to other Canadians, and under the care of Father Thérien, 450 people including French-Catholic Canadian homesteads were registered in the area in on 2 days in 1909, and the community was incorporated as the Village of St. Paul de Métis on June 14, 1912, though it was referred to as St. Paul des Métis by June 6, 1922, and would later incorporate as the Town of St. Paul, removing any mention of the Métis on December 15, 1936. The community would construct a 48 km railroad track to connect the village with the Canadian railway network in 1920, which had stopped at Spedden, Alberta.

== Demographics ==
In the 2021 Census of Population conducted by Statistics Canada, the Town of St. Paul had a population of 5,863 living in 2,284 of its 2,466 total private dwellings, a change of 0.6% from its 2016 population of 5,827. With a land area of 8.64 km^{2} (3.34 sq mi), it had a population density of 678.6/km^{2} (1,757.5/sq mi) in 2021.

The population of the Town of St. Paul according to its 2017 municipal census is 5,963, a change of −0.7% from its 2014 municipal census population of 6,004.

In the 2016 Census of Population conducted by Statistics Canada, the Town of St. Paul recorded a population of 5,827 living in 2,248 of its 2,378 total private dwellings, a 7.8% change from its 2011 population of 5,405. With a land area of 8.64 km^{2} (3.34 sq mi), it had a population density of 674.4/km^{2} (1,746.7/sq mi) in 2016.

As of the 2016 Canada Census, 71% of the population is of European descent. Indigenous people make up the next largest ethnic group with 16% of St. Paul's population. Most of the town's Indigenous residents are Cree or Métis. Visible minorities make up 12.3% of St. Pauls population. Filipino Canadians (6.1%) form the largest group, followed by Black Canadians (3.6%), Chinese (0.7%) and South Asians (0.7%).

== Economy ==
St. Paul's economy is driven by the agriculture and service industries. St. Paul is located in Alberta's Lakeland tourism district.

== Attractions ==
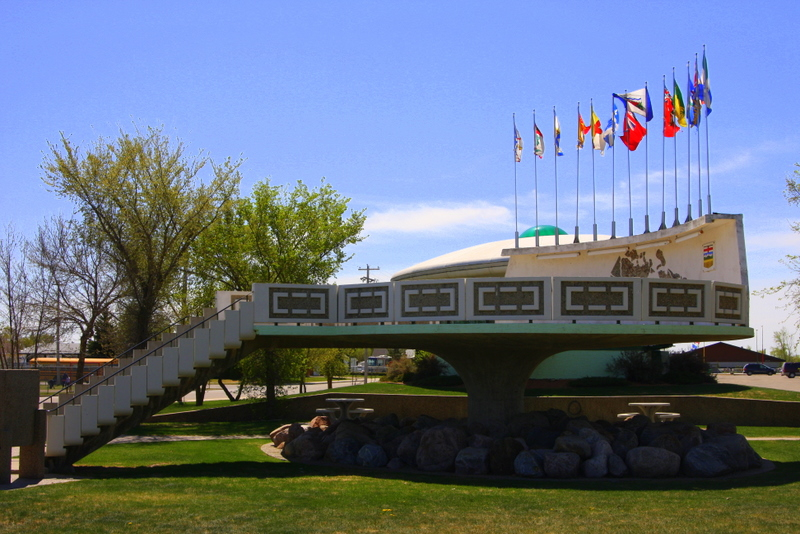
UFO landing pad in St. Paul

St. Paul is home to the world's first UFO landing pad, built as part of the 1967 Canadian Centennial celebrations in an effort to attract both tourists and Martians to the community. The pad consists of a 30-tonne raised platform with a map of Canada embossed on the back stop, consisting of stones provided by each province of Canada. On June 3, 1967, Paul Hellyer, Minister of National Defence, flew in by helicopter to officially open the Pad. The pad was one of over 100 Centennial Projects organized by the town. The idea for the UFO landing pad is credited to former town Mayor Jules Van Brabant and a couple of local business owners, the concrete and steel materials for the landing pad were donated by local construction companies, and a local designer developed the blueprint for the mushroom-shaped pod.

The sign beside the pad reads: "The area under the World's First UFO Landing Pad was designated international by the Town of St. Paul as a symbol of our faith that mankind will maintain the outer universe free from national wars and strife. That future travel in space will be safe for all intergalactic beings, all visitors from earth or otherwise are welcome to this territory and to the Town of St. Paul." Mentioned in George Fox's song, Real Canadian Town. The UFO Landing pad was also featured across Canada as a film crew with Cineplex Entertainment was in the town in May 2014 filming a pre-show piece to be played in Cineplex movie theatres across Canada throughout the month of June. The UFO landing pad was visited by Queen Elizabeth II and Prince Philip during their 1978 tour of Canada, which also included stops at the Vegreville egg and in other communities in Eastern Alberta.

== Notable people ==
- Ryley Barnes, former professional volleyball player
- Kyle Brodziak, professional hockey player
- Greg Evtushevski, professional hockey player
- Alex Janvier, indigenous visual artist
- Brett Kissel, professional country singer/songwriter
- Wilf Martin, former professional hockey player
- Caleb Lawrence McGillvary, convicted murderer known as the "Hatchet-Wielding Hitchiker".
- Audrey Poitras, former president of the Métis Nation of Alberta
- Marcel Rocque, curler
- Jamie Sadlowski, former professional long driver and golfer
- Stan Smyl, former professional hockey player
- Bernard Trottier, politician
- Calvin Vollrath, professional fiddler and composer
- Mike Wanchuk, former professional hockey player

== See also ==
- List of communities in Alberta
- List of francophone communities in Alberta
- List of towns in Alberta
