= Division No. 12, Alberta =

Census division in Canada

Coordinates: 54°27′51″N 110°10′57″W

Division No. 12
- Census division in Alberta
- Country: Canada
- Province: Alberta

Area
  - Total: 30,047 km^{2} (11,601 sq mi)

Population (2021)
  - Total: 67,483
  - Density: 2.2459/km^{2} (5.8169/sq mi)

Division No. 12 is a census division in Alberta, Canada. Including the City of Cold Lake, the majority of the division is located in the northeast corner of Northern Alberta. The northern portion of the division is located within northern Alberta.

== Census subdivisions ==
The following census subdivisions (municipalities or municipal equivalents) are located within Alberta's Division No. 12.

- Cities
  - Cold Lake
- Towns
  - Bonnyville
  - Elk Point
  - Smoky Lake
  - St. Paul
- Villages
  - Glendon
  - Vilna
  - Waskatenau
- Summer villages
  - Bonnyville Beach
  - Horseshoe Bay
  - Pelican Narrows
- Municipal districts
  - Bonnyville No. 87, M.D. of
  - Lac La Biche County
  - Smoky Lake County
  - St. Paul No. 19, County of
- Indian reserves
  - Beaver Lake 131
  - Cold Lake 149
  - Cold Lake 149A
  - Cold Lake 149B
  - Heart Lake 167
  - Kehewin 123
  - Puskiakiwenin 122
  - Saddle Lake 125
  - Unipouheos 121
  - White Fish Lake 128

== Demographics ==
Historical population
| Year | Pop. | ±% |
|---|---|---|
| 1991 | 54,485 | — |
| 1996 | 56,499 | +3.7% |
| 2001 | 58,362 | +3.3% |
| 2006 | 59,990 | +2.8% |
| 2011 | 63,427 | +5.7% |
| 2016 | 67,120 | +5.8% |
| 2021 | 67,483 | +0.5% |

In the 2021 Census of Population conducted by Statistics Canada, Division No. 12 had a population of 67,483 living in 25,554 of its 30,557 total private dwellings, a change of 0.5% from its 2016 population of 67,120. With a land area of 31,816.86 km^{2} (12,284.56 sq mi), it had a population density of 2.1/km^{2} (5.5/sq mi) in 2021.

== See also ==
- List of census divisions of Alberta
- List of communities in Alberta
