= Calgary–Edmonton Corridor =

- Geographic region
- The corridor consists of Alberta's three most densely populated census divisions and three largest cities.
- Interactive map of Calgary–Edmonton Corridor
- Coordinates: 52°N 114°W
- Country: Canada
- Province: Alberta

Area (2011)
  - Total: 38,323.18 km^{2} (14,796.66 sq mi)

Population (2021)
  - Total: 3,230,150
  - Density: 84.2871/km^{2} (218.303/sq mi)
- Time zone: UTC−7 (MST)
  - Summer (DST): UTC−6 (MDT)
- Forward sortation areas: T1S to T1V, T1X to T4S, T4X to T7A, T7X to T8R, T8T, T9A, T9E to T9G, T0C (part), T0E (part)
- Area codes: 403, 780, 587, 825, 368
- Highways: 1, 1A, 2, 2A, 8, 11, 11A, 14, 15, 16, 16A, 19, 22X, 28, 28A, 37, 39, 60, 100, 201, 216, 595
- Waterways: Bow River, Elbow River, North Saskatchewan River, Red Deer River, Battle River, Blindman River, Medicine River, Rosebud River, Sturgeon River, Raven River, North Raven River, Sheep River, Little Bow River, Highwood River, Brazeau River

The Calgary–Edmonton Corridor is a geographical region of the Canadian province of Alberta. It is the most urbanized area in Alberta and is one of Canada's four most populated urban regions. It consists of Statistics Canada Alberta census divisions No. 11, No. 8, and No. 6. Measured from north to south, the region covers a distance of approximately 400 km (250 mi). As of the designations in the Canada 2021 Census of census metropolitan areas (CMAs) and census agglomerations (CAs) in Alberta, the corridor includes three of the province's four CMAs (Calgary, Edmonton and Red Deer) and two CAs (Lacombe and Sylvan Lake), in addition to four other CAs already included in the Calgary and Edmonton CMAs.

The corridor is bordered by Edmonton and the surrounding area to the north, Red Deer in the middle, and Calgary and the surrounding area to the south.

== Transportation ==
Alberta Highway 2, also known as the Queen Elizabeth II Highway or QE2, is the busiest highway in Alberta and forms the central spine of the corridor.

A Canadian Pacific Kansas City rail line, originally built by the Calgary and Edmonton Railway in 1891, roughly parallels the highway. The line has been used exclusively by freight trains since 1985, when Via Rail discontinued its Calgary–South Edmonton train service. There have been several proposal and studies for high-speed rail through the region.

The corridor has two of Canada's five busiest airports: Calgary International and Edmonton International. The number of daily flights between these two airports number into the dozens, making it one of Canada's busiest commuter flight routes.

== Demographics ==
In the Canada 2001 Census, the population of the Calgary–Edmonton Corridor was 2,149,586, representing 72.3% of Alberta's population. In the Canada 2011 Census, the corridor's population had increased to 2,703,380 or 74.2% of the province's population. The population as of the Canada 2021 Census was 3,230,150.

The following presents the historic population growth of the Calgary–Edmonton Corridor between 1996 and 2021 by its three census divisions.

Census division	Area (km^{2})	Pop. (2021)	Pop. (2016)	Pop. (2011)	Pop. (2006)	Pop. (2001)	Pop. (1996)
Division No. 6	12,645.88	1,590,639	1,498,778	1,311,022	1,160,936	1,021,060	880,859
Division No. 8	9,909.31	213,470	209,395	189,243	175,337	153,049	133,592
Division No. 11	15,767.99	1,426,041	1,366,050	1,203,115	1,076,103	975,477	898,888
Calgary–Edmonton Corridor	38,323.18	3,230,150	3,074,223	2,703,380	2,412,376	2,149,586	1,913,339
Province of Alberta	640,081.87	4,262,635	4,067,175	3,645,257	3,290,350	2,974,807	2,696,826
Provincial proportion	6.0%	75.8%	75.6%	74.2%	73.3%	72.3%	70.9%

== Growth ==
The Calgary–Edmonton Corridor is one of the fastest growing regions and wealthiest regions in Canada. A 2003 study by TD Bank Financial Group found the GDP per capita in the corridor is 10% above average compared to U.S. metropolitan areas and 40% above average compared to other Canadian cities. Much of this is because of large oil revenues due to the growing cost of oil since 2003.

== Census subdivisions ==
The following are lists of the census subdivisions within the Calgary Metropolitan Region and Edmonton Metropolitan Region portions of the Calgary–Edmonton Corridor. The Edmonton Metropolitan Region's eight summer villages are not listed.

- Calgary Metropolitan Region
  - Airdrie
  - Beiseker
  - Calgary
  - Chestermere
  - Cochrane
  - Crossfield
  - Diamond Valley
  - Eden Valley 216 (Stoney First Nation)
  - Foothills County
  - High River
  - Irricana
  - Longview
  - Okotoks
  - Rocky View County
  - Tsuu T'ina Nation 145 (Tsuu T'ina Nation)
- Edmonton Metropolitan Region
  - Alexander 134 (Alexander First Nation)
  - Beaumont
  - Bon Accord
  - Bruderheim
  - Calmar
  - Devon
  - Edmonton
  - Enoch Cree Nation 135 (Enoch Cree Nation)
  - Fort Saskatchewan
  - Gibbons
  - Leduc
  - Leduc County
  - Legal
  - Morinville
  - Parkland County
  - Redwater
  - Spring Lake
  - Spruce Grove
  - St. Albert
  - Stony Plain
  - Strathcona County
  - Sturgeon County
  - Thorsby
  - Wabamun
  - Warburg
  - Wetaskiwin
  - Wabamun 133A & 133B (Paul First Nation)

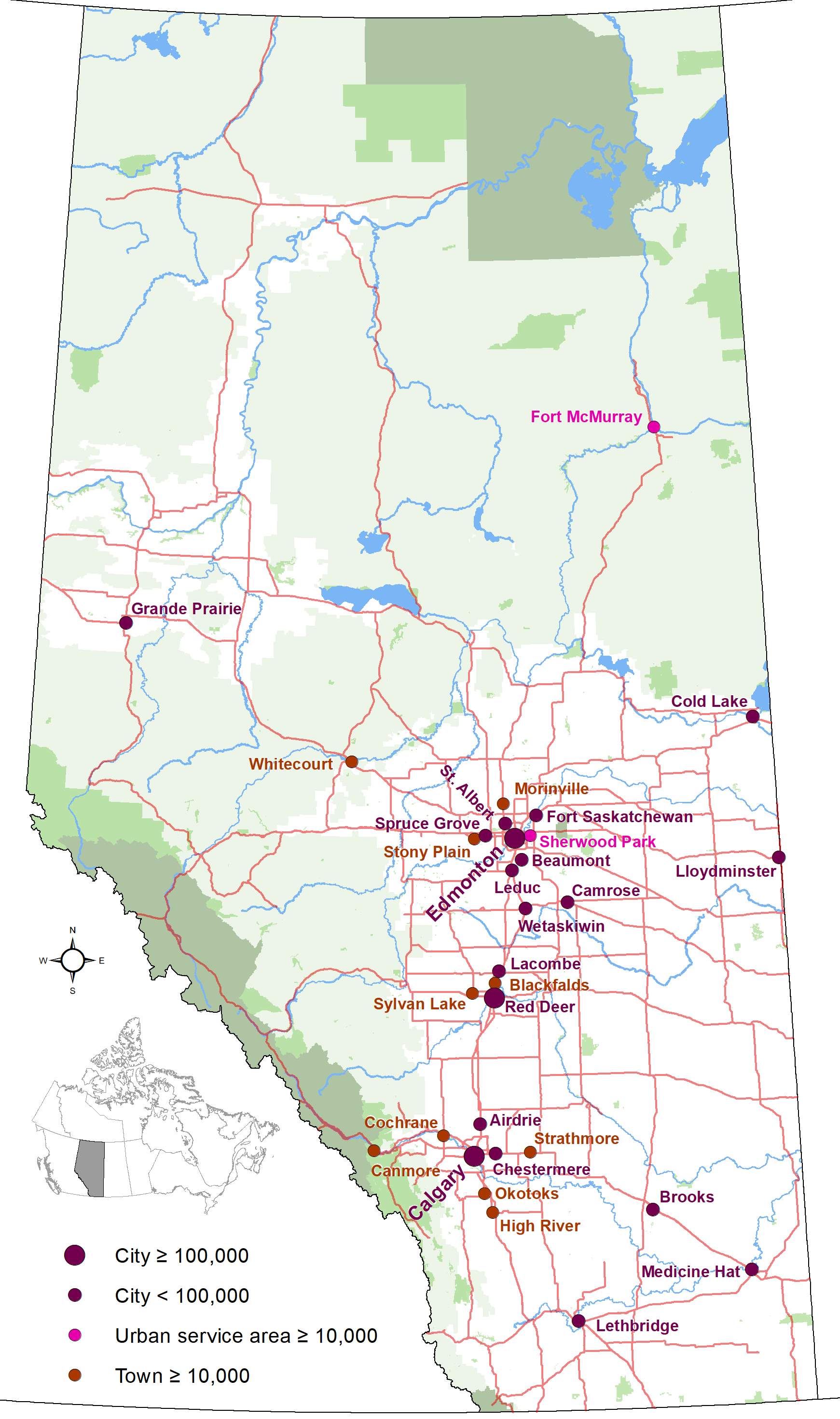
Map of Alberta showing the linear concentration of cities between Calgary and Edmonton.

== Gallery ==
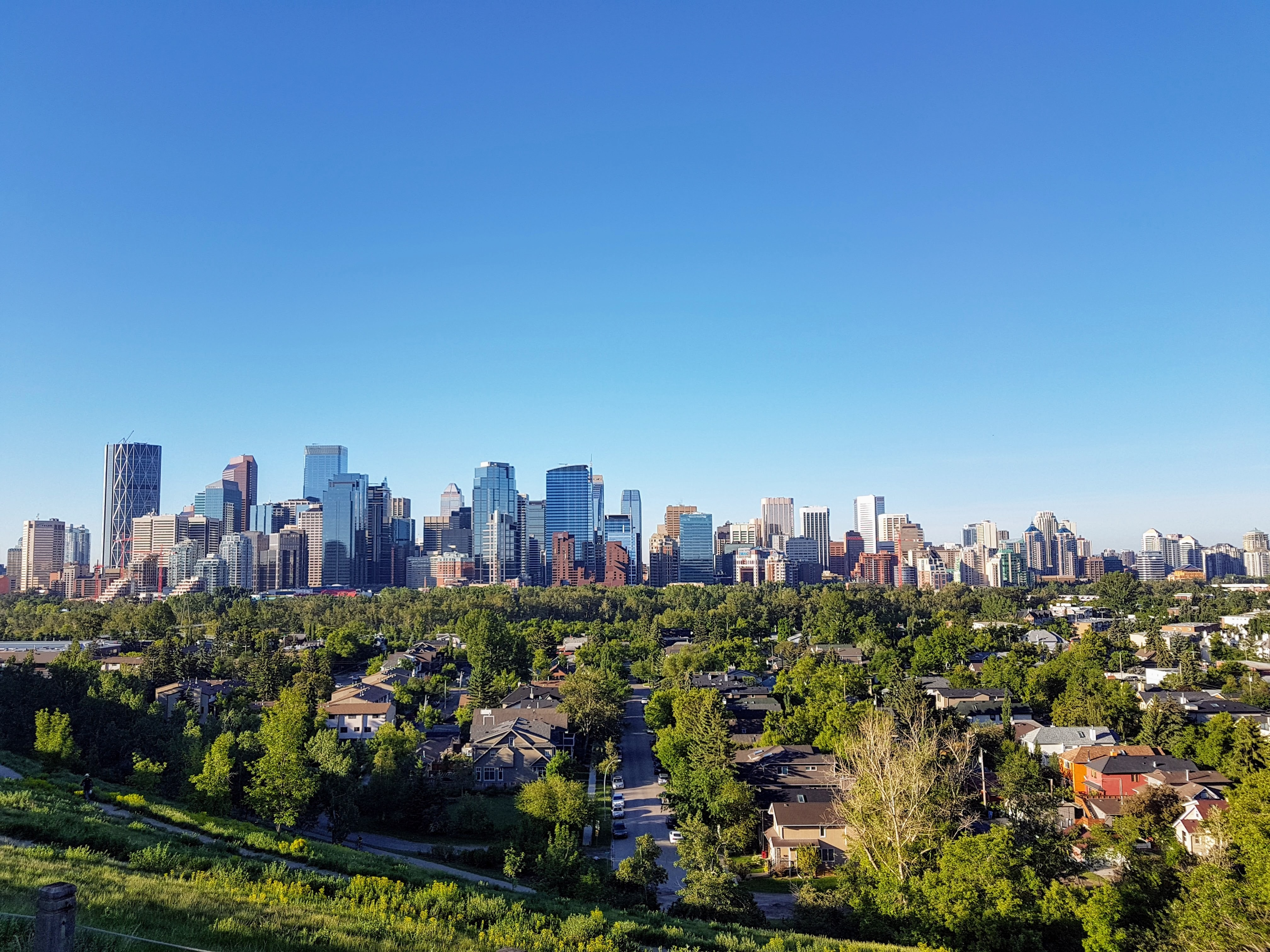
Calgary, the largest city in Alberta

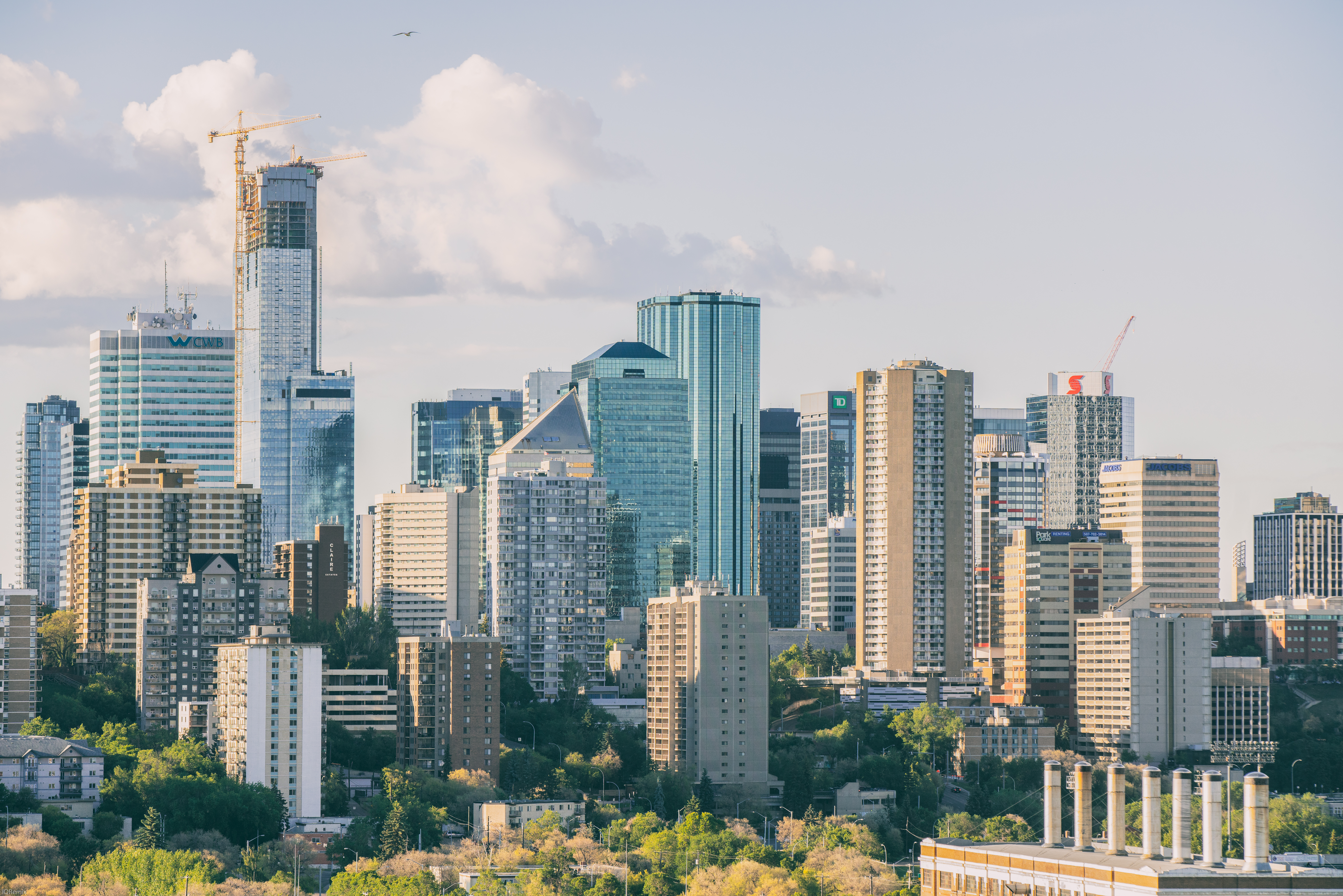
Edmonton, the capital and the second largest city in Alberta

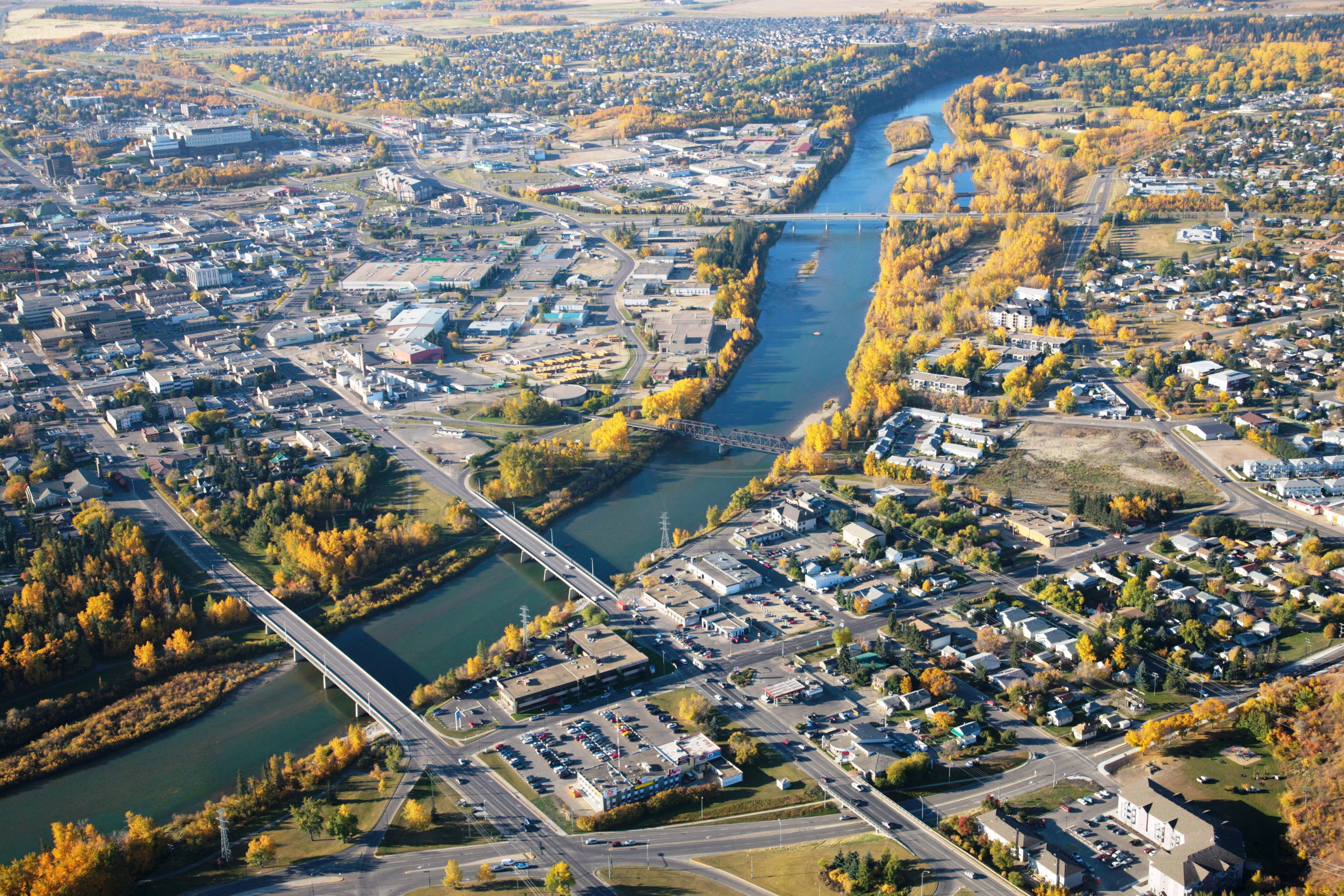
The Red Deer River flows through the city of Red Deer, AB, situated south of Edmonton and north of Calgary, approx. 150 km (93 miles, or 90 minutes‘ drive) each way.

== See also ==
- List of census divisions of Alberta
  - List of communities in Alberta
- Golden Horseshoe
- Greater Montreal
- Quebec City–Windsor Corridor
