= List of former Alberta provincial highways =

Alberta Provincial Highway Network
- Highway markers for Highway 1, Highway 1A, and Highway 67 in different vintages

- Alberta's provincial highway network as of April 2025

System information
- Maintained by the Ministry of Transportation and Economic Corridors
- Length: 31,400 km (19,500 mi)

Highway names
- Types: Core: Highway 1–216; X: Highway 1X–43X; Local/Rural: Highway 500–986

System links
- Alberta Numbered Highway Network; List; Former

This list consists of decommissioned or retired highways that have since been replaced with newer highways within Alberta's provincial highway network.

== Main highways ==
=== 1-216 series ===
These are highways or alternate routes in the 1–216 series that have been closed or replaced by newer highways in the same series.

Number	Length (km)	Length (mi)	Southern or western terminus	Northern or eastern terminus	Local names	Formed	Removed	Notes
Highway 1	1370	850	U.S. (Montana) border at Carway	B.C. border west of Demmitt		1926	c. 1941	Replaced by Highway 2; passes through Calgary, Red Deer, Edmonton, Peace River and Grande Prairie.
Highway 1	60	37	Bassano	Brooks		c. 1941	c. 1955	Replaced by Highway 36 between Brooks and Duchess; became Highway 550 and Highway 873 in 1973.
Highway 1A	6	3.7	BC 1A at the B.C. border at Kicking Horse Pass	Highway 1 at Lake Louise	Kicking Horse Trail	1962	c. 1990s	Route closed to automobile traffic.
Highway 1A	228	142	Highway 1 west of Lake Louise	Highway 16 in Jasper	Icefields Parkway	1940	1959	Replaced by Highway 93.
Highway 1A	11	6.8	Highway 1 (16 Avenue NW) / Crowchild Trail in Calgary	Highway 2 (Deerfoot Trail) / 17 Avenue SE in Calgary	• 14 Street W • 6 Avenue S • 9 Avenue S	1949	c. 1980	Former section of Highway 1 through downtown Calgary; Highway 1A was split into two sections when decommissioned.
Highway 1A	14	8.7	Highway 2 (Deerfoot Trail) in Calgary	Highway 1 in Chestermere	17 Avenue SE	1949	2013	Former section of Highway 1 through east Calgary.
Highway 1B	11	6.8	BC 1B at the B.C. border at Vermilion Pass	Highway 1 at Castle Junction	Banff–Windermere Highway	1941	1959	Replaced by Highway 93.
Highway 2	534	332	B.C. border at Kicking Horse Pass	SK border east of Walsh		1926	c. 1941	Replaced by Highway 1; passed through Banff, Calgary, and Medicine Hat.
Highway 2	97	60	BC 2 at the B.C. border west of Demmitt	Highway 34 (now Highway 43) north of Grande Prairie		c. 1941	1998	Section replaced by Highway 43.
Highway 2A	20	12	Highway 2 north of Nanton	Highway 23 in High River		—	1996	Former section of Highway 2.
Highway 2A	11	6.8	Highway 1 in Calgary	Highway 2 north of Calgary	Barlow Trail	—	c. 1980s	Former section of Highway 2.
Highway 2A	8	5.0	Highway 2 (109 Street) in Edmonton	Highway 2 (St. Albert Trail / 118 Avenue) in Edmonton	• Whyte Avenue • University Avenue • Saskatchewan Drive • Groat Road	1955	1970	Downtown Edmonton bypass via Groat Bridge.
Highway 3A	6	3.7	Highway 3 east of Coalhurst	Highway 3 in Lethbridge	• Westside Drive • Bridge Drive	1967	c. 1980s	Former section of Highway 3; all but a 650 m section, was decommissioned when the area was annexed by the City of Lethbridge.
Highway 8	11	6.8	Highway 1A (14 Street NW) in Calgary	Bowness Park in Bowness	• Kensington Road • Parkdale Boulevard • 3 Avenue NW • Bowness Road • 85 Street NW	—	1964	Serviced the former towns of Montgomery and Bowness. Decommissioned after the towns were annexed by the City of Calgary.
Highway 7	17	11	Black Diamond	Longview		—	—	Section replaced by Highway 22.
Highway 11A	13	8.1	Highway 11 at Benalto	Highway 20 in Sylvan Lake		c. 1987	c. 2008	Former section of Highway 11.
Highway 11X	28	17	Highway 11 at Benalto	Highway 2 in Red Deer		c. 1985	c. 1987	Designation of Sylvan Lake bypass during construction; replaced by Highway 11.
Highway 12	90	56	Highway 20 / Highway 51 at Bentley	Highway 39 at Alsike		—	c. 1980s	Section replaced by Highway 20.
Highway 13A	5	3.1	Highway 2A / Highway 13 in Wetaskiwin	Highway 13 / Highway 814 north of Wetaskiwin		—	—	Alternate route through Wetaskiwin.
Highway 14A	3	1.9	Downtown Edmonton	Highway 14 (Whyte Avenue) in Edmonton	• Connors Road • 83 Street	c. 1960	c. 1970	
Highway 14A	6	3.7	Edmonton	Highway 14 (Sherwood Park Freeway) near Sherwood Park	79 Avenue	1968	c. 1970s	Former section of Highway 14.
Highway 14X	3	1.9	Highway 14 (Sherwood Park Freeway) between Edmonton and Sherwood Park	Highway 16A (Baseline Road) between Edmonton and Sherwood Park		c. 1950s	1999	Replaced by Anthony Henday Drive.
Highway 14X	3	1.9	Baseline Road between Edmonton and Sherwood Park	Highway 16 between Edmonton and Sherwood Park		1996	1999	Replaced section of Highway 16A; replaced by Highway 216.
Highway 15	80	50	Highway 16 in downtown Edmonton	Highway 16 south of Mundare		c. 1930s	1940	Passed through Elk Island National Park; replaced by Highway 16.
Highway 16	98	61	Highway 15 in Edmonton	Highway 15 south of Mundare		c. 1930s	1940	Passed through Fort Saskatchewan; section replaced by Highway 15.
Highway 16A	16	9.9	Highway 16 in Edmonton	Edmonton eastern city limits		c. 1950s	c. 1980s	Former section of Highway 16 through downtown Edmonton.
Highway 16A	7	4.3	Edmonton city limits	Highway 16 east of Edmonton		c. 1950s	1996	Portion replaced by Highway 14X (now Highway 216).
Highway 16X	36	22	Highway 16 west of Stony Plain	Highway 2 / Highway 16 in Edmonton		c. 1970s	1997	Replaced by Highway 16.
Highway 17	14	8.7	Highway 16 at Manly Corner	Onoway		c. 1930s	c. 1940s	Replaced by Highway 43.
Highway 18	97	60	Highway 933 (now Highway 33) at Barrhead	Swan Hills		—	c. 1977	Section replaced by Highway 33.
Highway 19	70	43	Highway 12 (now Highway 20) at Winfield	Highway 2 (now Highway 2A) in Wetaskiwin		—	c. 1969	Replaced by Highway 13.
Highway 21A	33	21	Highway 9 at Beiseker	Highway 21 east of Carbon		1958	c. 1962	Former section of Highway 21; replaced by Highway 26 (now Highway 575 and Highway 806).
Highway 21A	5	3.1	Highway 21 southeast of Nevis	Highway 12 east of Nevis		—	c. 1991	Replaced by Highway 11.
Highway 22	17	11	Highway 553 (now Highway 22) near Priddis	Highway 2 (now Highway 2A) south of Calgary		—	c. 1976	Replaced by Highway 22X.
Highway 26	52	32	Highway 9 south of Carbon	Highway 9 at Beiseker		—	1970	Replaced by portions of Highway 575, Highway 806, and Highway 836.
Highway 28	49	30	Highway 36 at St. Brides	Highway 41 east of St. Paul		—	2006	Section replaced by Highway 29.
Highway 28A	3	1.9	Highway 28 north of Edmonton	CFB Edmonton		—	—	Access road to CFB Edmonton.
Highway 28A	46	29	Highway 28 / Highway 36 at Ashmont	Highway 28 / Highway 41 at Hoselaw		—	2006	Replaced by Highway 28.
Highway 28X	13	8.1	Highway 28 near Beaver Crossing	SK 55 at the SK border near Cherry Grove		—	c. 1977	Replaced by Highway 55.
Highway 29	6	3.7	Spring Lake (formerly Edmonton Beach)	Highway 16 (now Highway 16A) west of Stony Plain	• Range Road 15 • Township Road 530	—	c. 1985	
Highway 30	3.5	2.2	Kapasiwin	Highway 16 east of Wabamun	• Range Road 42 • Range Road 35	—	c. 1994	
Highway 33	10	6.2	Highway 43 south of Onoway	Alberta Beach		—	c. 1985	Section replaced by Highway 633.
Highway 34	152	94	Highway 2 north of Grande Prairie	Highway 2 (now Highway 49) north of Guy		1939	1998	47 km (29 mi) section between Valleyview and Guy replaced by Highway 43 (now Highway 49) in the early 1990s; remainder replaced by Highway 43.
Highway 34A	47	29	Highway 34 (now Highway 49) north of Valleyview	Highway 2 (now Highway 2A) west of High Prairie		1959	1966	Former Highway 34.
Highway 38	3.2	2.0	Stony Plain Road (former Highway 16A)	79 Avenue (now Whitemud Drive)	156 Street	—	c. 1962	Serviced the former town of Jasper Place; decommissioned when the town was annexed by the city of Edmonton.
Highway 40	24	15	U.S. (Montana) border at Whiskey Gap	Highway 2 south Cardston		—	1971	Border crossing closed; majority of route replaced by Highway 501.
Highway 43	77	48	Highway 2 / Highway 49 west of Donnelly	Highway 34 (now Highway 43) in Valleyview		c. 1990	1998	Section replaced by Highway 49.
Highway 43X	4	2.5	Range Road 63 (116 Street) north of Grande Prairie	Highway 2 / Highway 43 at Clairmont		2010	2019	Replaced by Highway 43 after it was extended to 100 Avenue in Grande Prairie.
Highway 46	152	94	Highway 28 at Radway	Highway 36 at Lac La Biche		—	c. 1978	Replaced by portions of Highway 55 and Highway 63.
Highway 48	114	71	S-232 at the U.S. (Montana) border at Wild Horse	Highway 1 west of Irvine		—	1979	Replaced by Highway 41.
Highway 51	36	22	Highway 761 north of Leslieville	Highway 12 / Highway 20 at Bentley		c. 1950s	c. 1985	Replaced by Highway 12.
Highway 55	15	9.3	Highway 16 east of Edmonton	Highway 15 in Fort Saskatchewan		—	c. 1976	Replaced by Highway 21.
Highway 57	82	51	Highway 39 at Alsike	Highway 16 at Entwistle		—	1979	Replaced by Highway 22 and Highway 39.
Highway 58A	22	14	Fort Vermilion	Highway 58 north of Fort Vermilion		c. 1970	c. 1973	Replaced by Highway 67 (now Highway 88).
Highway 67	428	266	Highway 2 at Slave Lake	Highway 58 north of Fort Vermilion		c. 1973	1988	Replaced by Highway 88.
Highway 69	14	8.7	Highway 63 in Fort McMurray	Saprae Creek	Airport Road	c. 1975	c. 2014	Reverted to R.M. of Wood Buffalo.
Highway 92	24	15	Highway 28 west of Ardmore	Township Road 643 west of Cold Lake		c. 1981	c. 1985	Former Highway 992; replaced by Highway 892.
Former

=== X series ===
Number	Length (km)	Length (mi)	Southern or western terminus	Northern or eastern terminus	Local names	Formed	Removed	Notes
Highway 2X	10	6.2	Highway 2 east of De Winton	Highway 2 / Highway 22X in Calgary	Deerfoot Trail	—	2003	Temporary designation during construction; replaced by Highway 2 when completed.
Highway 11X	28	17	Highway 11 at Benalto	Highway 2 in Red Deer		c. 1985	c. 1987	Designation of Sylvan Lake bypass during construction; replaced by Highway 11.
Highway 14X	3	1.9	Highway 14 (Sherwood Park Freeway) between Edmonton and Sherwood Park	Highway 16A (Baseline Road) between Edmonton and Sherwood Park		c. 1950s	1999	Replaced by Highway 216.
Highway 14X	3	1.9	Baseline Road between Edmonton and Sherwood Park	Highway 16 between Edmonton and Sherwood Park		1996	1999	Replaced section of Highway 16A; replaced by Highway 216.
Highway 16X	36	22	Highway 16 west of Stony Plain	Highway 2 / Highway 16 in Edmonton		c. 1970s	1997	Replaced by Highway 16.
Highway 28X	13	8.1	Highway 28 near Beaver Crossing	SK 55 at the SK border near Cherry Grove		—	c. 1977	Replaced by Highway 55.
Highway 43X	4	2.5	Range Road 63 (116 Street) north of Grande Prairie	Highway 2 / Highway 43 at Clairmont		2010	2019	Replaced by Highway 43 when extension to 100 Avenue in Grande Prairie
Former

== Other highways ==
=== 500-900 series ===
==== 500 ====
Number	Length (km)	Length (mi)	Southern or western terminus	Northern or eastern terminus	Local names	Formed	Removed	Notes
Highway 502	53	33	Highway 501 south of Manyberries	Highway 41 east of Onefour		—	c. 1994	
Highway 516	30	19	Highway 785 north of Pincher Creek	Highway 2 north of Fort Macleod		—	1979	Replaced by Highway 785.
Highway 517	22	14	Forestry Trunk Road	Highway 22 north of Lundbreck		—	2000	
Highway 553	22	14	Elbow Falls	Highway 22 at Priddis		c. 1973	c. 1983	
Highway 559	34	21	Highway 22 north of Bragg Creek	Calgary city limits	Bragg Creek Road / Richmond Road	—	1979	Replaced by Highway 8.
Highway 565	19	12	Highway 895 (Range Road 43) south of Oyen	Highway 41 in Acadia Valley		—	2000	
Highway 572	34	21	Highway 2 / Highway 2A southeast of Crossfield	Highway 9 / Highway 806 in Beiseker		—	1979	Replaced by Highway 72.
Highway 573	18	11	Highway 862 at Lonebutte	Highway 36 south of Hanna		1979	1998	
Highway 578	18	11	Highway 862 at Lonebutte	Highway 36 south of Hanna		—	1979	Replaced by Highway 573.
Highway 596	18	11	Highway 781 south of Sylvan Lake	Highway 11 west of Red Deer	Burnt Lake Trail	—	2000	
Former

==== 600 ====
Number	Length (km)	Length (mi)	Southern or western terminus	Northern or eastern terminus	Local names	Formed	Removed	Notes
Highway 606	44	27	Highway 922 (now Highway 22) north of Rocky Mountain House	Highway 20 in Rimbey		—	1979	Replaced by Highway 53.
Highway 612	44	27	Alder Flats	Highway 12 (now Highway 20) / Highway 13 at Winfield		—	1979	Replaced by Highway 13.
Highway 615	14	8.7	Highway 36 south of Viking	Highway 14 west of Kinsella		—	2009	Replaced by Highway 26.
Highway 634	38	24	Highway 757 northwest of Gainford	Former Highway 33 south of Alberta Beach		—	1979	Replaced by Highway 633.
Highway 635	51	32	Highway 43 west of Onoway	Highway 28 / Highway 37 at Namao		—	c. 1985	Replaced by Highway 37.
Highway 636	8	5.0	Highway 15 in Fort Saskatchewan	Highway 830 at Josephburg	Josephburg Road	—	2000	
Highway 637	76	47	Highway 15 west of Lamont	Highway 36 south of Duvernay		—	2006	Replaced by Highway 29.
Highway 649	15	9.3	Highway 757 north of Sangudo	Highway 764 north of Cherhill		—	2000	7 km (4 mi) section replaced by Highway 654; 8 km (5 mi) section decommissioned.
Highway 650	34	21	Highway 33 north of Rich Valley	Highway 44 in Alcomdale		—	2000	
Highway 655	20	12	Highway 763 at Campsie	Highway 933 (now Highway 33) in Barrhead		—	1977	Replaced by Highway 18.
Highway 656	41	25	Highway 2 / Highway 18 west of Clyde	Highway 46 (now Highway 63) east of Thorhild		—	1977	Section replaced by Highway 18.
Highway 662	125	78	Highway 36 south of Lac La Biche	Highway 28 in Cold Lake		—	c. 1977	Replaced by Highway 55.
Highway 664	32	20	Highway 2 in Athabasca	Highway 46 (now Highway 63) north of Boyle		—	c. 1977	Replaced by Highway 55.
Highway 686	158	98	Highway 35 north of Grimshaw	Highway 88 south of Red Earth Creek		—	c. 1995	Replaced by Highway 986.
Former

==== 700 ====
Number	Length (km)	Length (mi)	Southern or western terminus	Northern or eastern terminus	Local names	Formed	Removed	Notes
Highway 720	22	14	Highway 671 west of Goodfare	Highway 43 north of Horse Lakes 152B		—	2000	
Highway 724	7	4.3	Township Road 710	Highway 43 west of Wembley		—	2000	
Highway 734	26	16	Highway 40 / Highway 579 north of Waiparous	Clearwater County boundary	Forestry Trunk Road	c. 1995	2000	Section transferred to the Municipal District of Bighorn No. 8.
Highway 734	168	104	Highway 40 at Muskeg River	Highway 43 east of DeBolt	Forestry Trunk Road	c. 1985	2000	
Highway 742	62	39	Highway 40 in Peter Lougheed Provincial Park	Canmore	Smith-Dorrien / Spray Trail	—	2000	
Highway 745	29	18	Highway 43 in Little Smoky	Highway 665 south of Valleyview	Little Smoky Road	—	2000	
Highway 746	29	18	Highway 2A east of Guy	Highway 2 in McLennan		—	2000	
Highway 755	49	30	Highway 16 between Evansburg and Wildwood	Highway 918 north of Mayerthorpe		—	1979	Replaced by Highway 22.
Highway 773	18	11	Highway 549 west of Okotoks	Highway 22X in Calgary		—	c. 2000	
Highway 782	3	1.9	Calgary city limits	Highway 566 west of Balzac	Centre Street N	—	2007	Transferred to the City of Calgary as part of city annexation.
Highway 788	13	8.1	Highway 628 south of Spruce Grove	Township Road 540 west of Villeneuve	Golden Spike Road / Calahoo Road	—	c. 2003	Decommissioned; Highway 16 intersection closed due to Range Road 274 (Jennifer Heil Way) interchange construction.
Highway 789	28	17	Highway 901 southeast of Calgary	Highway 564 northeast of Calgary	84 Street E	—	1979	
Highway 794	66	41	Highway 16 north of Acheson	Highway 18 in Westlock		—	1999	Replaced by Highway 44.
Highway 797	9.7	6.0	North bank of the Bow River	Highway 560 (Glenmore Trail) in Langdon		—	2000	Section transferred to Rocky View County.
Former

==== 800 ====
Number	Length (km)	Length (mi)	Southern or western terminus	Northern or eastern terminus	Local names	Formed	Removed	Notes
Highway 847	15	9.3	Township Road 200	Highway 1 in Bassano		—	2000	
Highway 868	30	19	Highway 55 / Highway 36 in Lac La Biche	Highway 858 at Owl River		—	c. 1990	Replaced by Highway 881.
Highway 897	8	5.0	CFB Cold Lake boundary	Highway 28 / Highway 55 in Grand Centre		—	1996	Section transferred to City of Cold Lake as part of annexation.
Former

==== 900 ====
Number	Length (km)	Length (mi)	Southern or western terminus	Northern or eastern terminus	Local names	Formed	Removed	Notes
Highway 901	10	6.2	Highway 2 / Highway 22X in Calgary	Former Highway 789 east of Calgary		—	1980	Section replaced by Highway 22X.
Highway 901	27	17	Former Highway 789 east of Calgary	Highway 24 north of Carseland		—	c. 1987	Section replaced by Highway 22X.
Highway 911	17	11	Red Deer	Highway 815 east of Red Deer		—	c. 1982	Replaced by Highway 11.
Highway 911	33	21	Highway 815 east of Red Deer	Highway 21 / Highway 21A southwest of Nevis		c. 1989	1992	Replaced by Highway 11.
Highway 918	48	30	Highway 43 at Green Court	Highway 18 at Campsie		—	—	Replaced by Highway 18.
Highway 919	12	7.5	Highway 60 in Devon	Highway 2 / Highway 625 in Nisku		—	—	Replaced by Highway 19.
Highway 922	111	69	Highway 3 west of Lundbreck	Highway 22 / Highway 541 at Longview		—	c. 1980	Replaced by Highway 22.
Highway 922	38	24	Highway 22 at Priddis	Highway 1 / Highway 22 south of Cochrane		1975	1977	Replaced by Highway 22.
Highway 922	255	158	Highway 1A in Cochrane	Highway 57 (now Highway 39) east of Drayton Valley		c. 1973	c. 1980	Replaced by Highway 22.
Highway 926	64	40	Highway 13 in Camrose	Highway 36 south of Viking		c. 1973	c. 1977	Replaced by Highway 26.
Highway 932	204	127	Highway 32 / Highway 748 north of Peers	Highway 2 east of Kinuso		c. 1974	c. 1977	Passed through Whitecourt and Swan Hills; replaced by Highway 32 and Highway 33.
Highway 933	48	30	Highway 43 at Gunn	Highway 18 at Barrhead		—	c. 1977	Unimproved sections of Highway 33; replaced by Highway 33.
Highway 940	101	63	Highway 40 at the Crowsnest Pass boundary	Highway 40 / Highway 541 west of Longview	Forestry Trunk Road	c. 1981	c. 1990	
Highway 940	46	29	Highway 1A west of Cochrane	Highway 579 north of Waiparous	Forestry Trunk Road	c. 1981	c. 1993	Replaced by Highway 40.
Highway 940	293	182	Highway 579 north of Waiparous	Highway 40 at the Lovett River	Forestry Trunk Road	c. 1981	c. 1990	Became Highway 734 in c. 1995.
Highway 940	168	104	Highway 40 at Muskeg River	Highway 34 (now Highway 43) east of DeBolt	Forestry Trunk Road	c. 1981	c. 1985	Replaced by Highway 734.
Highway 947	244	152	Highway 16 in Edson	Highway 2 east of Kinuso		c. 1973	c. 1974	Passed through Whitecourt and Swan Hills; replaced by Highway 748 and Highway 932 (now Highway 32 and Highway 33).
Highway 953	79	49	Highway 21 / Highway 605 at Bashaw	Highway 36 / Highway 608 east of Forestburg		—	c. 1977	Replaced by Highway 53.
Highway 956	30	19	Highway 12 / Highway 56 in Stettler	Highway 953 (now Highway 53) west of Donalda		—	c. 1977	Section replaced by Highway 56.
Highway 956	45	28	Highway 53 / Highway 56 west of Donalda	Highway 13 east of Camrose		—	c. 1985	Replaced by Highway 56.
Highway 969	14	8.7	Highway 63 in Fort McMurray	South of Saprae Creek		c. 1975	c. 1985	Replaced by Highway 69 (now Airport Road).
Highway 992	24	15	Highway 28 west of Ardmore	Township Road 643 west of Cold Lake		—	c. 1985	Replaced by Highway 92 (now Highway 892).
Former

== See also ==
- List of Alberta provincial highways
