= Alberta Highway 28 =

Highway in Alberta

Highway 28
- Highway 28 highlighted in red

Route information
- Maintained by Alberta Transportation
- Length: 286 km (178 mi)

Major junctions
- West end: Highway 216 in Edmonton
- Highway 37 at Namao; Highway 28A near Gibbons; Highway 38 in Redwater; Highway 63 near Radway; Highway 36 from Vilna to Ashmont; Highway 41 from Hoselaw to Bonnyville; Highway 55 in Cold Lake
- East end: Lakeshore Drive in Cold Lake

Location
- Country: Canada
- Province: Alberta
- Specialized and rural municipalities: Sturgeon County, Thorhild County, Smoky Lake County, St. Paul No. 19 County, Bonnyville No. 87 M.D.
- Major cities: Edmonton, Cold Lake
- Towns: Bon Accord, Gibbons, Redwater, Smoky Lake, Bonnyville
- Villages: Waskatenau, Vilna

Highway system
- Alberta Numbered Highway Network; List; Former
| ← Highway 27 | → Highway 28A |

Highway 28 is a 286-kilometre (178 mi) highway in north-central Alberta, Canada that connects Edmonton to Cold Lake. The highway is a component of Canada's National Highway System. Between Highway 28A near Gibbons and the intersection with Highway 63 near Radway, it forms part of the Northeast Alberta Trade Corridor and is designated as a core route. For the remainder of the route from Radway to the eastern end at Cold Lake, it is designated as a feeder route.

== Route description ==
Highway 28 begins at the intersection of 97 Street and Anthony Henday Drive (Highway 216), Edmonton's ring road, at the north end of the city. It enters Sturgeon County, passing CFB Edmonton and Bon Accord. After merging with Highway 28A near Gibbons it travels in a northeasterly direction through Redwater and intersects Highway 63 just west of Radway. It continues east and winds through agricultural lands of north-central Alberta, roughly paralleling the North Saskatchewan River, passing through Waskatenau and Smoky Lake. It intersects Highway 36 near Vilna, and shares a 36-kilometre (22 mi) concurrency to Ashmont. At Hoselaw, it intersects Highway 41 and shares a 18-kilometre (11 mi) concurrency to Bonnyville. Highway 28 continues east to Beaver Crossing, where it intersects Highway 55, about 14 kilometres (9 mi) west of the Saskatchewan border; the two routes turn north and share a 10-kilometre (6 mi) wrong-way concurrency and enter the City of Cold Lake where they connect Cold Lake South (the former town of Grand Centre) with Cold Lake North. After Highway 55 leaves the route, it runs northeast and ends at Lakeshore Drive along the shores of Cold Lake.

== History ==
Highway 28 began as a short highway travelling north out of Downtown Edmonton to Namao, ending in the Gibbons and Coronado area. Highway 28 started at Jasper Avenue (Highway 15 east and Highway 16 west) and followed 100 Street and 101 Street to Norwood Boulevard, cosigned with Highway 16. The routes split and Highway 16 continued east to 86 Street and Fort Road and Highway 28 continued north on 97 Street. In c. 1940, the Highway 15 & 16 designations were switched east of Edmonton, resulting in Highway 28 sharing a concurrency Highway 15 in Downtown Edmonton. Highway 28 was extended northeastward, connected to St. Paul in mid-1940s and Cold Lake in the early 1950s. In 1961, a more direct route between Ashmont and Hoselaw was constructed and designated as Highway 28A; construction of the highway required splitting Mann Lake in two, creating Upper and Lower Mann Lake. Work continued on paving the route throughout the 1960s, and by the end of the decade the route was fully paved between Edmonton and Cold Lake.

When Highway 16 was moved to Yellowhead Trail in the 1980s, the Highway 28 designation was removed from city streets south the roadway and its new southern terminus was at the 97 Street / Yellowhead Trail intersection. In 2006, as part of an effort to simplify highway route numbering in the St. Paul area, Highway 28 was rerouted to Highway 28A to formalize the more contiguous route between Edmonton and Cold Lake, while Highway 28 through St. Paul was re-signed to be part of Highway 29. In 2016, Anthony Henday Drive was completed and in subsequent years the official Highway 28 designation was removed from 97 Street inside the ring road.

=== Highway 28X ===
Highway 28X
- Location: Bonnyville M.D. No. 87
- Length: 14 km (8.7 mi)

Highway 28X was a 14-kilometre (9 mi) spur route of Highway 28. It began at Highway 28, approximately 10 kilometres (6 mi) south of Cold Lake, and travelled to the Saskatchewan boundary where it continued east as Saskatchewan Highway 55. In c. 1977, Highway 28X was part of a number of highways which were renumbered when Alberta Highway 55 was established between Athabasca and the Saskatchewan border.

== Future ==
Alberta Transportation ultimately intends to upgrade the entire Edmonton-Fort McMurray corridor to a divided highway, which would include twinning of Highway 28 from Highway 28A to Highway 63.

== Major intersections ==
| Rural/specialized municipality | Location | km | mi | Destinations | Notes |
|---|---|---|---|---|---|
| City of Edmonton | | −7.3 | −4.5 | Yellowhead Trail (Highway 16 (TCH/YH)) – Lloydminster, Jasper | Single-point urban interchange; Highway 16 exit 389; former Highway 28 southern terminus |
| City of Edmonton | | 0.0 | 0.0 | Anthony Henday Drive (Highway 216) | Interchange; Highway 216 exit 39 |
| Sturgeon County | | 0.8 | 0.50 | Former Highway 28A north | Interchange permanently closed and removed |
| Sturgeon County | | 4.7 | 2.9 | Sturgeon Road | Access to CFB Edmonton |
| Sturgeon County | Namao | 8.0 | 5.0 | Highway 37 – Onoway, Fort Saskatchewan | |
| Sturgeon County | | 17.8 | 11.1 | Highway 642 west – Morinville | |
| Sturgeon County | | 20.4 | 12.7 | Highway 803 north | Directional signage changes from north/south to east/west |
| Sturgeon County | Bon Accord | 25.7 | 16.0 | | |
| Sturgeon County | Gibbons | 32.6 | 20.3 | Highway 28A south – Edmonton | Trumpet interchange; south end of Northeast Alberta Trade Corridor |
| Sturgeon County | | 46.0 | 28.6 | Highway 651 west – Legal | |
| Sturgeon County | Redwater | 52.6 | 32.7 | Highway 38 east (48 Avenue) – Bruderheim, Two Hills | |
| Thorhild County | | 62.6 | 38.9 | Highway 827 north – Egremont, Thorhild, Athabasca | |
| Thorhild County | | 69.1 | 42.9 | Highway 63 north – Lac La Biche, Fort McMurray; Highway 829 south – Redwater | North end of Northeast Alberta Trade Corridor |
| Thorhild County | Radway | 75.3 | 46.8 | UAR 158 south | |
| Smoky Lake County | | 85.7 | 53.3 | Highway 831 – Boyle, Lamont | |
| Smoky Lake County | Waskatenau | 86.8 | 53.9 | UAR 74 south | |
| Smoky Lake County | Warspite | 97.1 | 60.3 | UAR 104 south | |
| Smoky Lake County | Smoky Lake | 108.4 | 67.4 | Highway 855 – Caslan, Andrew, Mundare | |
| Smoky Lake County | Smoky Lake | 109.2 | 67.9 | UAR 156 south | |
| Smoky Lake County | | 131.7 | 81.8 | Highway 857 south – Willingdon, Vegreville; UAR 217 north – Bellis | |
| Smoky Lake County | | 138.2 | 85.9 | Highway 36 north – Lac La Biche | West end of Highway 36 concurrency |
| Smoky Lake County | Vilna | 145.7 | 90.5 | UAR 116 south | |
| Smoky Lake County | | 147.0 | 91.3 | Highway 859 south | |
| Smoky Lake County | Spedden | 159.2 | 98.9 | PAR 120 north – Garner Lake Provincial Park | |
| County of St. Paul No. 19 | | 162.4 | 100.9 | Highway 866 north | |
| County of St. Paul No. 19 | Ashmont | 169.4 | 105.3 | Highway 36 south – St. Paul, Two Hills | East end of Highway 36 concurrency; Highway 28 formerly followed Highway 36 south to St. Paul; west end of former Highway 28A |
| County of St. Paul No. 19 | | 177.8 | 110.5 | Highway 867 north | |
| County of St. Paul No. 19 | | 191.1 | 118.7 | Highway 881 – Therien, St. Vincent, St. Paul | |
| M.D. of Bonnyville No. 87 | | 199.2 | 123.8 | Highway 882 north – Glendon | |
| M.D. of Bonnyville No. 87 | Hoselaw | 215.8 | 134.1 | Highway 41 south – St. Paul, Elk Point, Vermilion | West end of Highway 41 concurrency; Highway 28 formerly followed Highway 41 south to St. Paul; east end of former Highway 28A |
| M.D. of Bonnyville No. 87 | | 226.0 | 140.4 | UAR 96 west – Bonnyville Beach | |
| Bonnyville | | 233.3 | 145.0 | Highway 41 north (55 Street) – La Corey | East end of Highway 41 concurrency |
| Bonnyville | | 235.2 | 146.1 | Highway 659 east (50 Avenue) – Lloydminster | |
| M.D. of Bonnyville No. 87 | | 239.9 | 149.1 | Highway 660 west | |
| M.D. of Bonnyville No. 87 | Ardmore | 253.3 | 157.4 | Highway 892 | |
| M.D. of Bonnyville No. 87 | Beaver Crossing | 271.3 | 168.6 | Crosses the Beaver River | |
| M.D. of Bonnyville No. 87 | | 273.1 | 169.7 | Highway 55 east to Highway 897 – Cherry Grove, Pierceland, Lloydminster, Elizabeth Settlement | South end of Highway 55 wrong-way concurrency; formerly Highway 28X east |
| City of Cold Lake | | 278.3 | 172.9 | 50 Avenue / Centre Avenue – CFB Cold Lake | Former Highway 897 |
| City of Cold Lake | | 283.3 | 176.0 | Highway 55 west / 16 Avenue – Cold Lake Provincial Park, Lac La Biche | North end of Highway 55 wrong-way concurrency |
| City of Cold Lake | | 285.7 | 177.5 | Lakeshore Drive | Highway 28 eastern terminus |
1.000 mi = 1.609 km; 1.000 km = 0.621 mi: Closed/former; Concurrency terminus
