= Alberta Highway 28A =

Highway in Alberta

Highway 28A

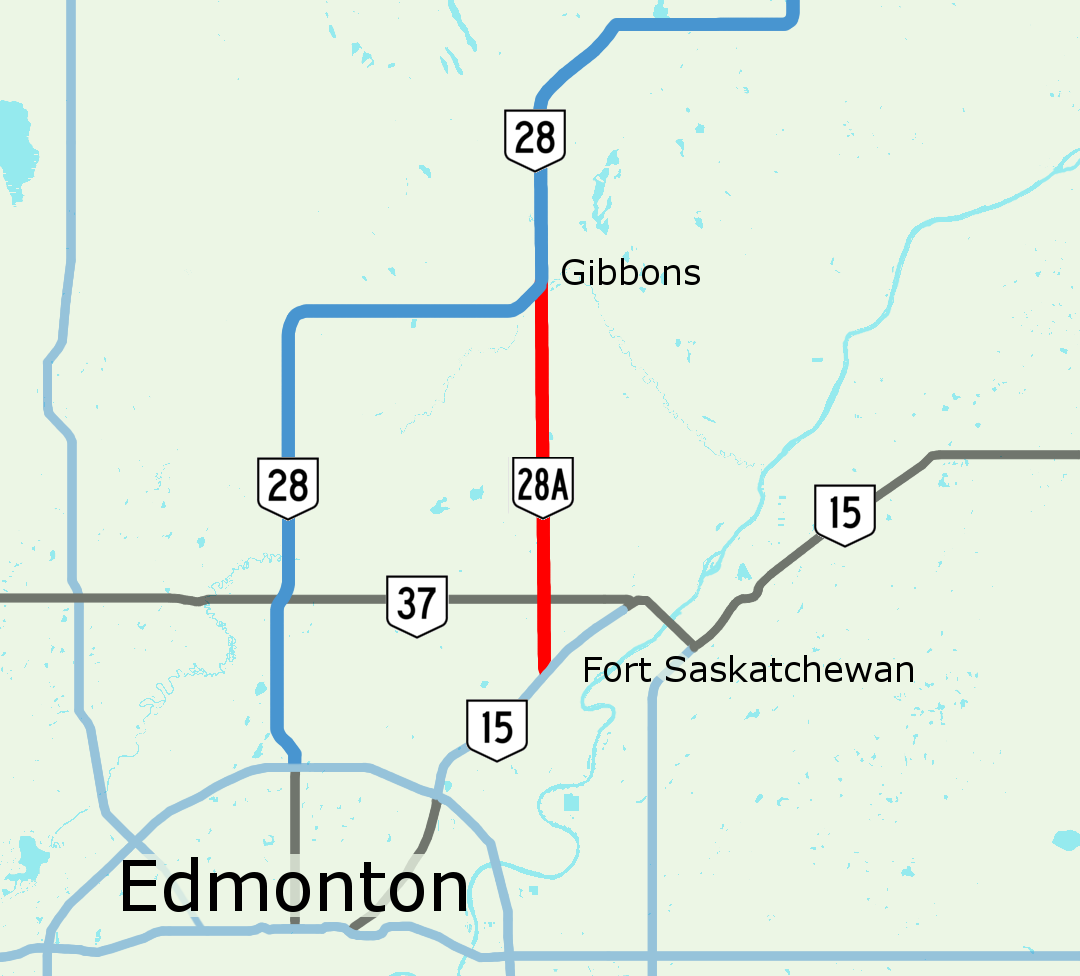
- Highway 28A highlighted in red

Route information
- Auxiliary route of Highway 28
- Maintained by Alberta Transportation
- Length: 17.71 km (11.00 mi)

Major junctions
- South end: Highway 15 in Edmonton
- Highway 37 near Ft. Saskatchewan; Highway 643 in Gibbons
- North end: Highway 28 near Gibbons

Location
- Country: Canada
- Province: Alberta
- Specialized and rural municipalities: Sturgeon County
- Major cities: Edmonton
- Towns: Gibbons

Highway system
- Alberta Provincial Highway Network; List; Former
← Highway 28	→ Highway 29
National Highway System

Alberta Provincial Highway No. 28A, commonly referred to as Highway 28A, is an 18-kilometre (11 mi) highway in Alberta, Canada that connects Highway 15 in northeast Edmonton to Highway 28 near Gibbons. It is numbered 17 Street NE within Edmonton and forms an alternate route to Highway 28 into the city from the north. As the southernmost component of the Northeast Alberta Trade Corridor, the highway is designated as a core route of Canada's National Highway System for its entire length.

Highway 28A began as a gravel road in the 1930s, formerly designated as Highway 37 which it now intersects at the north Edmonton city limit. Alberta Transportation has plans to upgrade Highways 28 and 28A to a divided highway, with long term plans for a freeway between Edmonton and Fort McMurray.

== Route description ==
Like most rural two-lane highways in Alberta, Highway 28A is not a controlled-access highway, as numerous driveways and local roads intersect it at-grade. Nevertheless, it forms part of the Edmonton-Fort McMurray corridor and is designated as a core route of the National Highway System. The highway begins at an intersection in northeast Edmonton where it splits to the north from Manning Drive (Highway 15) near 227 Avenue. As 17 Street NE, the two-lane highway proceeds through rural residential and agricultural lands north of Edmonton for approximately 3.5 km (2 mi)to Highway 37, crossing into Sturgeon County. It continues north to the town of Gibbons in which it intersects 50 Avenue and Highway 643 (53 Avenue), approximately 37 km (23 mi) north of downtown Edmonton. A bridge carries a branch of the Canadian National Railway over the highway before the road crosses the Sturgeon River on a culvert. While crossing the river, the road briefly widens to a divided highway then immediately terminates at a trumpet interchange with Highway 28.

== History ==
Highway 28A had been in place as a gravel road since at least 1940, then signed as Highway 37 running from Highway 15 to north of Gibbons. At this time, Highway 28 terminated near Bon Accord and did not connect to present day Highway 28A. A route from Mundare to Cold Lake via Brosseau and St. Paul had already been built by 1930, which later comprised portions of Highway 28 by the mid-1950s. The culvert over the Sturgeon River was built in 1970. The railway overpass in Gibbons was constructed in 1973, followed by the Highway 28 interchange in 1974.

Another 46 km (29 mi) section formerly existed between Ashmont and Hoselaw as a bypass of St. Paul, forming a shorter route to Cold Lake than Highway 28. As part of an effort to simplify highway route numbering, this section was re-signed as Highway 28 in 2006, when Highway 28 through St. Paul was re-signed as Highway 29.

== Future ==
Alberta Transportation ultimately intends to upgrade the entire Edmonton-Fort McMurray corridor to a divided highway. A functional study which included public consultation was completed in 2011 to develop plans for interchanges and access management along Highway 28A. It calls for potential modifications to the existing interchange at Highway 28, and new interchanges at Highway 643 in Gibbons and Township Road 554 to the south. The highway would be realigned slightly east of Gibbons to allow for widening, necessitating new bridges over the Sturgeon River and a relocation of the Canadian National Railway overpass in Gibbons.

== Major intersections ==
Starting from the south end of Highway 28A:

Rural/specialized municipality	Location	km	mi	Destinations	Notes
City of Edmonton		0.0	0.0	Highway 15 (Manning Drive) – Fort Saskatchewan	Begins as 17 Street NE
Sturgeon County		3.4	2.1	Highway 37 – Onoway, Fort Saskatchewan	Traffic signals
Sturgeon County	Gibbons	16.4	10.2	Highway 643 east / 53 Avenue	
Sturgeon County	Gibbons	17.7	11.0	Highway 28 – Cold Lake, Fort McMurray, Bon Accord, Edmonton (97 Street)	Trumpet interchange
1.000 mi = 1.609 km; 1.000 km = 0.621 mi
