= Alberta Highway 15 =

Highway in Alberta

Highway 15
- Highway 15 highlighted in red

Route information
- Maintained by Alberta Transportation, Edmonton, and Fort Saskatchewan
- Length: 86.6 km (53.8 mi)

Major junctions
- West end: Highway 216 in Edmonton
- Highway 28A in Edmonton; Highway 37 near Fort Saskatchewan; Highway 21 in Fort Saskatchewan; Highway 45 near Bruderheim; Highway 29 near Lamont
- East end: Highway 16 (TCH) / Highway 855 near Mundare

Location
- Country: Canada
- Province: Alberta
- Specialized and rural municipalities: Sturgeon County, Strathcona County, Lamont County
- Major cities: Edmonton, Fort Saskatchewan
- Towns: Lamont, Mundare
- Villages: Chipman

Highway system
- Alberta Numbered Highway Network; List; Former
← Highway 14	→ Highway 16

Highway 15 is a highway in the Edmonton Region of Alberta, connecting northeast Edmonton to the City of Fort Saskatchewan and communities within Lamont County. It serves as an alternative to Highway 16 that bypasses Elk Island National Park; the highway follows the route of a railway line completed in 1905 by the Canadian Northern Railway. In Edmonton, the route is named Manning Drive, a developing freeway named after Ernest Manning, the premier of Alberta from 1943 to 1968.

Highway 15 is designated as a core route of Canada's National Highway System, between Anthony Henday Drive (Highway 216) and the intersection with Highway 28A within Edmonton and is part of the Northeast Alberta Trade Corridor.

== Route description ==
Highway 15 begins at the intersection of Manning Drive and Anthony Henday Drive (Highway 216), Edmonton's ring road. It proceeds northeast through a largely rural area, despite being within Edmonton city limits, to the southern terminus of Highway 28A. Within Sturgeon County, it intersects with the eastern terminus of Highway 37 and then turns southeast to cross the North Saskatchewan River, where it enters Fort Saskatchewan and intersects the northern terminus of Highway 21. Fort Saskatchewan was established as a North West Mounted Police post in 1875 and incorporated as a city in 1985. The Shell Scotford upgrader, refinery, and chemicals complex, operational since 1984, is located east of Fort Saskatchewan along the highway corridor.

From this junction, Highway 15 travels northeast again and then east, intersecting Highway 45, about 3 kilometres (2 mi) south of Bruderheim, and Highway 29 about 4 kilometres (2 mi) northwest of Lamont. It turns southeast and passes through Lamont, Chipman, and Mundare. Lamont County, which the highway traverses for much of its eastern half, has been formally recognized as the cradle of Ukrainian settlement in Canada following the arrival of Ukrainian homesteaders in the 1890s. At Mundare, a 42 feet (13 m) monument to kovbasa (Ukrainian sausage) stands in the town's heritage park, reflecting Stawnichy's Mundare sausage, which has been produced there since 1959. At the outskirts of Mundare, it begins a 2.2-kilometre (1.4 mi) concurrency with Highway 855 before ending at Highway 16.

== History ==
Highway 15 began the route connecting Edmonton with Elk Island National Park, which Highway 16 followed Fort Road and passed through Fort Saskatchewan and Lamont before continuing towards the Saskatchewan border. Beginning at Jasper Avenue in Downtown Edmonton, Highway 15 followed Rowland Road and the Dawson Bridge before taking 101 Avenue out of town, eventually rejoining Highway 16 about 15 kilometres (9 mi) south of Chipman. In c. 1940, the Highway 15 & 16 designations were switched east of Edmonton and Highway 16 assumed the more direct easterly route. Cosigned with Highway 28, Highway 15 followed 100 Street and 101 Street to Norwood Boulevard, where Highway 28 followed 97 Street and Highway 15 continued east to 86 Street, turning north and following Fort Road in a northeasterly direction towards Fort Saskatchewan. It then travelled east and southeast, ending at Highway 16 south of Chipman. In the mid-1950s, Highway 15 was realigned to follow the railway in a southeasterly direction from Chipman to Mundare, relocating its eastern terminus with Highway 16. In 1972, Highway 15 was realigned and twinned north of 137 Avenue to present-day Highway 28A. At the time, most of the new roadway was in Sturgeon County and was not annexed into Edmonton until the early 1980s when it became Manning Drive.

When Highway 16 was moved to Yellowhead Trail in the 1980s, the Highway 15 designation was removed from city streets south the roadway and its new western terminus was at the Fort Road / Yellowhead Trail intersection. In 1988, Highway 15 was moved from Fort Road to 50 Street, creating a more direct route to Highway 16 and bypassing the Fort Road CN Rail underpass which had a clearance of 4.0 metres (13 ft 1 in), as opposed to the 50 Street CN Rail underpass which has a clearance of 5.5 metres (18 ft 1 in). In 2016, Anthony Henday Drive was completed and in subsequent years the official Highway 15 designation was removed from Manning Drive and 50 Street inside the ring road.

In 2017, the provincial government announced that the bridge spanning the North Saskatchewan River, connecting Sturgeon County to Fort Saskatchewan, would be twinned, as well a new pedestrian bridge underneath; A separate project also saw remaining 7-kilometre (4 mi) Fort Saskatchewan–Edmonton portion twinned. The twinning of the highway was completed in the fall of 2019, the new eastbound bridge opened in October 2022, and the pedestrian underslung bridge opened in July 2023.

== Construction and improvements ==
Alberta Transportation's 2023 and 2024 provincial construction programs listed improvements to Highway 15, all designated as economic corridor projects supporting oversize and overweight vehicle movement. A project to construct an overpass at the Highway 15 and Highway 830 intersection was in engineering in both years. A separate intersection improvement project was in planning as of 2024.

== Major intersections ==
Rural/specialized municipality	Location	km	mi	Destinations	Notes
City of Edmonton		−5.6	−3.5	Yellowhead Trail (Highway 16 (TCH/YH)) / 50 Street – Lloydminster, Jasper	Interchange; Highway 16 exit 394; former Highway 15 western terminus and followed 50 Street
City of Edmonton		−3.3– −3.1	−2.1– −1.9	Manning Drive / 50 Street	Highway 15 followed Manning Drive; original Highway 15 followed Manning Drive and Fort Road
City of Edmonton		0.0– 1.5	0.0– 0.93	Anthony Henday Drive (Highway 216)	Interchange; Highway 216 exit 46; Highway 15 western terminus
City of Edmonton		8.5	5.3	Highway 28A north (17 Street NE) – Gibbons, Cold Lake, Fort McMurray	Former Highway 37 alignment
Sturgeon County		13.5	8.4	Highway 37 west to Highway 825 – Namao, Onoway, Sturgeon Industrial Park	
↑ / ↓		15.6	9.7	Crosses the North Saskatchewan River	
City of Fort Saskatchewan		16.2	10.1	99 Avenue	Interchange
City of Fort Saskatchewan		17.2	10.7	Highway 21 south to Highway 16 (TCH) / 94 Street – Sherwood Park, Edmonton	
Strathcona County		29.6	18.4	Highway 830 south – Josephburg	West end of Highway 830 concurrency
Strathcona County		36.3	22.6	Highway 830 north – Highway 38	East end of Highway 830 concurrency
Lamont County		39.6	24.6	Highway 45 north – Bruderheim, Two Hills	
Lamont County		46.0	28.6	Highway 29 east – St. Paul	Former Highway 637 east
Lamont County	Lamont	48.0	29.8	Highway 831 south – Elk Island National Park	West end of Highway 831 concurrency
Lamont County	Lamont	50.0	31.1	Highway 831 north (48 Street) – Waskatenau	East end of Highway 831 concurrency
Lamont County	Chipman	59.5	37.0	Highway 834 south – Tofield	
Lamont County	Hilliard	73.0	45.4	Range Road 175	
Lamont County	Mundare	84.4	52.4	Highway 855 north (Sawchuck Street) – Andrew	West end of Highway 855 concurrency
Lamont County		86.6	53.8	Highway 16 (TCH/YH) – Vegreville, Lloydminster, Edmonton Highway 855 south – Ryley, Holden	Highway 15 eastern terminus; Highway 855 continues south
1.000 mi = 1.609 km; 1.000 km = 0.621 mi: Closed/former; Concurrency terminus

== See also ==
- Transportation in Edmonton
