= Alberta Highway 14X =

Former highway in Alberta, Canada

Highway 14X

Route information
- Maintained by the Ministry of Transportation and Economic Corridors
- Length: 3.1 km (1.9 mi) 1996-1999: 6.4 km (4.0 mi)
- Existed: 1950s–1999

Major junctions
- South end: Highway 14 / Sherwood Park Fwy
- North end: Highway 16A / Baseline Rd

Location
- Country: Canada
- Province: Alberta
- Specialized and rural municipalities: Strathcona County
- Major cities: Edmonton

Highway system
- Alberta Provincial Highway Network; List; Former
← Highway 14	→ Highway 15

Alberta Provincial Highway No. 14X, commonly referred to as Highway 14X, was the designation of a former spur route of Highway 14 in Alberta, Canada. It was a short north-south provincial highway located in Strathcona County between Edmonton and Sherwood Park and is now part of Anthony Henday Drive (Highway 216).

== History ==
In the early 1950s, Highway 14 was a gravel highway which entered the Edmonton area from the southeast, briefly traveled north-south along Range Road 234, and then turned west and entered Edmonton along Wye Road (76 Avenue) and 82 (Whyte) Avenue. At the same time, Highway 16 entered region from the east along Township Road 532, briefly turned south along Range Road 234, and then west along Baseline Road into Edmonton where it became 101 Avenue. When Highway 14 was paved in the mid-1950s, the 3.2 km (2.0 mi) section of Range Road 234 connecting Highways 14 and 16 was also paved and became Highway 14X; in the late 1950s, Highway 16 was realigned to enter Edmonton along 118 Avenue and the former section became Highway 16A.

In 1968, a cloverleaf interchange was opened at the Highway 14X/14 junction as part of the Sherwood Park Freeway construction. In the early 1970s, Highway 14X and the north-south section of Highway 16A were divided with interchanges being opened at Highway 16 in 1971 and Baseline Road in 1975, in conjunction with the province establishing a Restricted Development Area around Edmonton which included Highway 14X. In 1996, Highway 16A was decommissioned and Highway 14X was extended north by renumbering to Highway 16, extending the length of Highway 14X to 6.4 km (4.0 mi); however it was short-lived, as the city of Edmonton extended Whitemud Drive to Highway 14, located 3.4 km (2.1 mi) south of Sherwood Park Freeway. In 1999, Highway 14 was realigned to follow Whitemud Drive and as part of the Highway 14 realignment, Highway 14X was renumbered to Highway 216.

== Major intersections ==
The entire route is in Strathcona County. All exits are unnumbered.

km	mi	Destinations	Notes
0.0	0.0	Highway 14 east – Wainwright	Continued south; present-day part of Anthony Henday Drive (Highway 216)
0.0	0.0	Highway 14 west (Sherwood Park Freeway) / Wye Road east – Edmonton, Sherwood Park	Southern terminus
3.1	1.9	Highway 16A west (101 Avenue) / Baseline Road east – Edmonton, Sherwood Park	Northern terminus (pre-1996); continued as Highway 16A
5.8– 6.4	3.6– 4.0	Highway 16 (TCH/YH) (Yellowhead Trail) – Edmonton, Lloydminster	Northern terminus (1996-1999)
5.8– 6.4	3.6– 4.0	Meridian Street	Freeway ended and continued north as Meridian Street; replaced by Anthony Henday Drive (Highway 216)
1.000 mi = 1.609 km; 1.000 km = 0.621 mi: Closed/former
