= Alberta Highway 37 =

Highway in Alberta

Highway 37

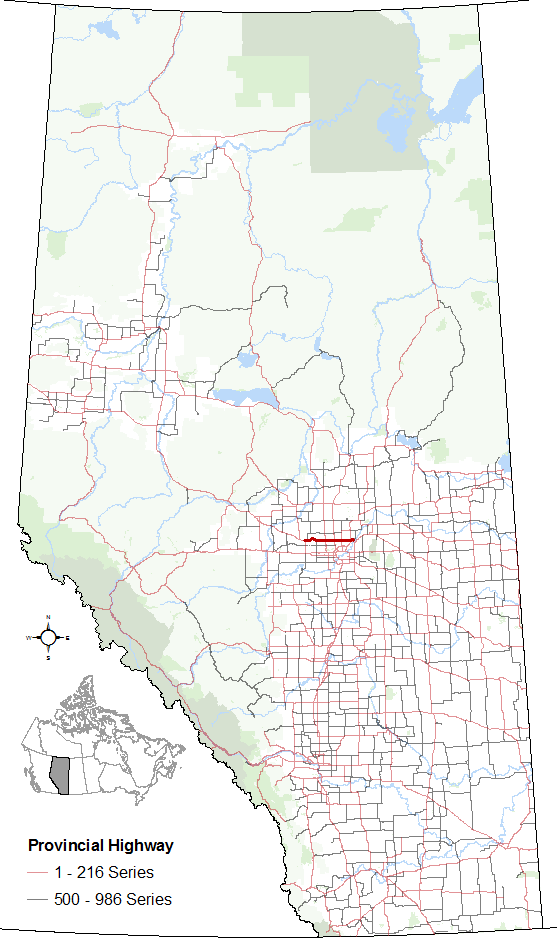

Route information
- Maintained by Alberta Transportation
- Length: 67.4 km (41.9 mi)

Major junctions
- West end: Highway 43 west of Onoway
- Highway 2 Highway 28; Highway 28A
- East end: Highway 15 west of Fort Saskatchewan

Location
- Country: Canada
- Province: Alberta
- Specialized and rural municipalities: Lac Ste. Anne County, Sturgeon County
- Major cities: Edmonton
- Towns: Onoway

Highway system
- Alberta Provincial Highway Network; List; Former
← Highway 36	→ Highway 38

Highway 37 is a highway in the province of Alberta, Canada. It runs in an east–west direction just north of St. Albert and Edmonton, from west of Onoway to west of Fort Saskatchewan.

Starting in the west, Highway 37 begins 3.4 km (2.1 mi) west of Onoway (nicknamed Hub of the Highways) where it leaves Highway 43 and parallels it east for 1.6 km (1 mi), before Highway 43 turns south. It continues for most of its length on Township Road 550, a correction line, except for avoiding the Sturgeon River and crossing it twice.

North of Edmonton, from Range Road 241 (50 Street NW) to Range Road 232 (33 Street NE), it is given the designation 259 Avenue. However, it does not enter city limits, as the city's boundary is on the south side of the right of way. Highway 37 ends northeast of Edmonton just short of Fort Saskatchewan when it intersects with Highway 15.

== Major intersections ==
Starting at the west end of Highway 37:

Rural/specialized municipality	Location	km	mi	Destinations	Notes
Lac Ste. Anne County		0.0	0.0	Highway 43 – Edmonton, Whitecourt, Grande Prairie	Highway 37 western terminus
Lac Ste. Anne County	Onoway	5.0	3.1	Highway 777 north / Lac St. Anne Trail – Sunrise Beach	
Sturgeon County		17.9	11.1	Highway 779 south – Stony Plain	
Sturgeon County	Calahoo	21.0	13.0		
Sturgeon County		30.2	18.8	Highway 44 – Villeneuve, Westlock	Former Highway 794
Sturgeon County		42.0	26.1	Highway 2 – Athabasca, Morinville, St. Albert, Edmonton (St. Albert Trail)	Interchange
Sturgeon County	Namao	51.2	31.8	Highway 28 – Bon Accord, Cold Lake, Edmonton (97 Street)	
Sturgeon County–Edmonton boundary		63.0	39.1	Highway 28A (17 Street NE) – Gibbons, Fort McMurray, Edmonton	Highway 37 formerly followed Highway 28A north to Gibbons
Sturgeon County		67.2	41.8	Highway 825 north – Sturgeon Industrial Park	
Sturgeon County		67.4	41.9	Highway 15 – Fort Saskatchewan, Edmonton (Manning Drive)	Highway 37 eastern terminus
1.000 mi = 1.609 km; 1.000 km = 0.621 mi
