= Alberta economic corridors =

Alberta Economic Corridors

System information
- Maintained by the Ministry of Transportation and Economic Corridors
- Length: 7,100 km (4,400 mi)

Highway names
- Provincial Highways: Alberta Highway XX

System links
- Alberta Numbered Highway Network; List; Former

The Alberta economic corridors are priority economic corridors defined by Alberta Transportation and Economic Corridors. These corridors are designed to link Alberta with other jurisdictions and include transportation, energy, power, telecommunications and other utilities.

In addition to the National Highway System, Alberta's economic corridors include a series of transport corridors that are part of the provincial highway network, as well a High Load Corridor Network to transport oversized loads.

== East–west corridors ==
=== Highway 1 (Trans-Canada Highway) Corridor ===
Highway 1 Trans-Canada Highway
- Location: British Columbia–Saskatchewan borders
- Length: 534 km (332 mi)

The Trans-Canada Highway (Highway 1) in southern Alberta that runs between the British Columbia and Saskatchewan boundaries, passing through Calgary, Medicine Hat, and Banff National Park. The corridor is approximately 534 kilometres (332 mi) long and includes Highway 1 and portions of Highway 201 around Calgary, both designated as Core Routes of the National Highway System, as well as the Canadian Pacific Kansas City (CPKC) mainline. Highway 1 provides access to international markets through the Ports of Vancouver and Montreal.

=== Highway 3 (Crowsnest) Corridor ===
Highway 3 Crowsnest Highway
- Location: British Columbia border– Medicine Hat
- Length: 324 km (201 mi)

The Crowsnest Highway (Highway 3) in southern Alberta that runs between the British Columbia border and Medicine Hat, linking to Saskatchewan via Highway 1, and passes through Lethbridge. The corridor is approximately 324 kilometres (201 mi) long and includes Highway 3, designated a Core Route of the National Highway System, as well as and the Canadian Pacific Kansas City (CPKC) mainline. Highway 3 provides access to international markets through the Port of Vancouver, and also links to the Eastport–Kingsgate Border Crossing (via British Columbia Highway 95 southwest of Cranbrook), which provides access to the Pacific Northwest.

=== Highway 16 (Yellowhead) Corridor ===
Highway 16 Yellowhead Highway Trans-Canada Highway
- Location: British Columbia–Saskatchewan borders
- Length: 634 km (394 mi)

The Yellowhead Highway (Highway 16) in central Alberta that runs between the British Columbia and Saskatchewan boundaries, passing through Edmonton, Lloydminster, and Jasper National Park. The corridor is approximately 634 kilometres (394 mi) long and includes Highway 16 designated as a Core Route of the National Highway System and part of the Trans-Canada Highway network, as well as the Canadian National Railway mainline. Highway 16 provides access to international markets through the Ports of Vancouver (via British Columbia Highway 5, also part of the Yellowhead Highway) and Prince Rupert. It also links to Central and Eastern Canada via the Trans-Canada Highway, either via Saskatchewan Highway 11 or at its eastern terminus west of Winnipeg.

=== Highway 9 (Calgary to Saskatchewan) ===
Highway 9
- Location: Calgary–Saskatchewan border
- Length: 324 km (201 mi)

Highway 9, along with Saskatchewan Highway 7, connects Calgary with Saskatoon via Drumheller. Beginning at Highway 1 east of Calgary near Langdon, the corridor is approximately 324 kilometres (201 mi) long and is designated as a Core Route of the National Highway System. While not officially listed as part of the Highway 9 corridor, Highway 72 serves as an alternate access route to Calgary, linking with Highway 2 north of the city near Crossfield.

=== Highway 11 (Red Deer to Saskatchewan River Crossing) ===
Highway 11
- Location: Saskatchewan River Crossing– Red Deer
- Length: 254 km (158 mi)

Highway 11, also known as the "David Thompson Highway", connects Red Deer with the Rocky Mountains and Banff National Park via Rocky Mountain House. The corridor is approximately 254 kilometres (158 mi) and is not part the National Highway System. Part of the corridor includes a proposed extension to the Trans-Canada Highway near Golden, British Columbia through Howse Pass; however, the conceptual route would be under the jurisdiction of Parks Canada (being located in Banff National Park) and the Province of British Columbia, and would require their support.

=== Highway 28 (Edmonton to Cold Lake) ===
Highway 28
- Location: Edmonton–Cold Lake
- Length: 285 km (177 mi)

Highway 28 connects Edmonton with Cold Lake, including the Cold Lake oil sands, and includes a 14-kilometre (9 mi) section of Highway 55 between Cold Lake and the Saskatchewan border. The corridor is approximately 285 kilometres (177 mi) is designated as a Feeder Route of the National Highway System.

=== Northern Trade Corridor ===
Northern Trade Corridor
- Location: Rainbow Lake–High Level Mackenzie Highway–Saskatchewan border
- Length: 817 km (508 mi)

Northern Trade Corridor is a discontiguous east–west economic corridor that runs across Northern Alberta and consists of Highway 58 from High Level to Rainbow Lake, Highways 986 and 686 from the Mackenzie Highway (Highway 35) to Peerless Lake, and Highway 956 from Highway 881 to the Saskatchewan border.

Highway 58 from High Level to Rainbow Lake is approximately 285 kilometres (177 mi) and is designated as a Northern Feeder Route of the National Highway System. There is also conceptual western extension to the British Columbia border; however, the there is no connecting all-weather highway in British Columbia and would require a new highway connecting to Fort Nelson and the Alaska Highway.

Highway 986 is approximately 158 kilometres (98 mi) and runs from Highway 35, 20 km (10 mi) north of Grimshaw and 36 km (20 mi) northwest of Peace River, to Highway 88 near Red Earth Creek. Highway 686 is approximately 91 kilometres (57 mi) and runs from Highway 88 at Red Earth Creek to Peerless Lake; however there is a proposed 218-kilometre (135 mi) extension to Fort McMurray. When completed, the two routes would link Fort McMurray to the Peace River region.

Highway 956 is approximately 65 kilometres (40 mi) and is conceptual route that runs from Highway 881, 25 km (20 mi) south of Anzac and 75 km (50 mi) south of Fort McMurray, to the Saskatchewan border and connecting with Saskatchewan Highway 956. When completed it would link Fort McMurray to La Loche, Saskatchewan.

=== Northern Woods and Water Route (Highways 2, 49, and 55) ===
Northern Woods and Water Route Highways 2, 49, and 55
- Location: British Columbia–Saskatchewan borders
- Length: 853 km (530 mi)

Not officially recognized as an economic corridor, the Northern Woods and Water Route in northern Alberta is notable as it runs between the British Columbia and Saskatchewan borders and is one of only three routes in Alberta that connects to both provinces, with the others being the Trans-Canada and Yellowhead Highways. The route is approximately 853 kilometres (530 mi) and is not part of the National Highway System. The Northern Woods and Water Route consists of:

- Highway 49 from the British Columbia border, where it continues as British Columbia Highway 49 to Dawson Creek, to Highway 2 at either Rycroft or Donnelly (the section between Rycroft and Donnelly functioning as an alternate route)
- Highway 2 from Rycroft, through Peace River and Slave Lake, to Athabasca
- Highway 55 from Athabasca, through Lac La Biche and Cold Lake, to the Saskatchewan border where it continues as Saskatchewan Highway 55

== North–south corridors ==
=== CANAMEX Corridor ===
CANAMEX Corridor
- Location: United States–British Columbia border
- Length: 1,164 km (723 mi)

The CANAMEX Corridor is a trilateral trade corridor that connects Canada, the United States, and Mexico. Within Alberta, the CANAMEX Corridor is approximately 1,164 kilometres (723 mi) long and the entire length of the is designated as a Core Route of the National Highway System. The CANAMEX Corridor consists of:

- Highway 4 from the Coutts–Sweetgrass Border Crossing, where it continues into Montana as Interstate 15, to Lethbridge
- Highway 3 from Lethbridge to Fort Macleod
- Highway 2 from Fort Macleod, through Calgary and Red Deer, to Edmonton
- Highway 201 as an alternate route through Calgary
- Highway 216 through Edmonton
- Highway 16 from Edmonton to the Highway 43 junction
- Highway 43 from the Highway 16 junction, through Grande Prairie, to the British Columbia border, where it continues as British Columbia Highway 2 to Dawson Creek and connects with the Alaska Highway

The CANAMEX Corridor also includes Canadian Pacific Kansas City rail line, which runs from the Coutts–Sweetgrass border crossing, through Lethbridge, Calgary, and Red Deer, to Edmonton. It also passes by both the Calgary and Edmonton International Airports.

=== Northeast Alberta Trade Corridor (Highway 63 to Fort McMurray) ===
Northeast Alberta Trade Corridor Highway 63
- Location: Edmonton–Fort McMurray
- Length: 424 km (263 mi)

The Northeast Alberta Trade Corridor connects Edmonton to the Fort McMurray region, including the Athabasca oil sands, and includes Highway 63, as well as portions of Highway 15, Highway 28A, and Highway 28, which connect Edmonton to Highway 63. The corridor is approximately 424 kilometres (263 mi) long is designated as a Core Route of the National Highway System south of Fort McMurray, and includes the Canadian National Railway rail line. A notable omission is that there is no reference of any winter road upgrades to all-season highway north of Fort McMurray, connecting to Fort Chipewyan, Wood Buffalo National Park, and Fort Smith, Northwest Territories, despite lobbying efforts from local indigenous communities.

=== Eastern Alberta Trade Corridor (Highways 36, 41, and 881) ===
Northeast Alberta Trade Corridor Highways 36, 41, and 881
- Location: United States border– Cold Lake/Fort McMurray
- Length: 950 km (590 mi)

The Eastern Alberta Trade Corridor is located in eastern Alberta and consists of parallel routes connecting Canada–U.S. border to the Fort McMurray and Cold Lake regions. The corridor consists of Highway 36 from Warner to Lac La Biche, Highway 881 from Lac La Biche to Highway 63. Concurrently, it also consists of Highway 41 from the Wild Horse Border Crossing to La Corey. The Eastern Alberta Trade Corridor is promoted as the most direct route linking the oil sands with Texas and Mexico, and works in association with the North American Ports-to-Plains Alliance. The corridor is not part of the National Highway System.

Highway 36, also known as Veterans Memorial Highway, is approximately 626 kilometres (389 mi) and begins at Highway 4 near Warner, approximately 38 kilometres (24 mi) north of the Coutts–Sweetgrass border crossing, past Taber, Brooks and Vegreville, to Lac La Biche. The corridor then follows a 264-kilometre (164 mi) section of Highway 881 from Lac La Biche to Highway 63, about 16 kilometres (10 mi) south of Fort McMurray. There have been proposals to renumber the section of Highway 881 north of Lac La Biche to become part of Highway 36.

Highway 41, also known as Buffalo Trail, is approximately 686 kilometres (426 mi) and begins at the Wild Horse Border Crossing, where it continues as Montana Highway 232 to Havre and connects with U.S. Route 87, past Medicine Hat, Wainwright, and Bonnyville, to Highway 55 near La Corey, approximately 18 kilometres (10 mi) north of Bonnyville or 37 kilometres (20 mi) west of Cold Lake. The Wild Horse Border Crossing closed at 5:00 pm in the winter and 9:00 pm during the summer, unlike the Coutts–Sweetgrass border crossing which is open 24 hours. In 2023, Alberta Premier Danielle Smith and Montana Governor Greg Gianforte wrote a joint letter their respective federal governments to upgrade the boarder crossing to 24 hours.

=== Highway 22 (Cowboy Trail) ===
Highway 22 Cowboy Trail
- Location: Lundbreck–Mayerthorpe
- Length: 584 km (363 mi)

Highway 22, also known as the Cowboy Trail, is located in western Alberta. It begins at Highway 3 near Lundbreck, passes through the western edge of the Calgary Region (bypassing the City of Calgary), Rocky Mountain House, and Drayton Valley, before ending at Highway 18 just north of Mayerthorpe. The corridor is approximately 584 kilometres (363 mi) and is not part the National Highway System.

The Cowboy Trail continues along Highway 6 and Highway 5 between Pincher Creek and Cardston through Waterton Lakes National Park; however, this section is not included as part of the Economic Corridor.

=== Arctic Corridor (Highway 35 and Highway 58 East) ===
Arctic Corridor (Mackenzie Highway)
- Location: Valleyview–NWT border High Level–Wood Buffalo National Park
- Length: 623 km (387 mi)

The Arctic Corridor connects Valleyview (and Edmonton via the CANAMEX Highway/Highway 43) to the Northwest Territories, where it continues as Northwest Territories Highway 1. It includes Highway 35, also known as the Mackenzie Highway, as well as portions of Highway 2 and Highway 49 between Valleyview and Grimshaw via Peace River. The corridor is approximately 623 kilometres (387 mi) long is designated as a Core Route of the National Highway System; it also includes the Canadian National Railway rail line that runs between Peace River and Hay River, Northwest Territories.

The Arctic Corridor also includes a 194-kilometre (121 mi) spur from High Level to the Wood Buffalo National Park boundary via Highway 58; the section of highway is designated as Northern Feeder Route of the National Highway System. There is conceptual route through Wood Buffalo National that would connect Highway 58 to Fort Chipewyan and Fort Smith, Northwest Territories.

== Ring roads ==
Both Calgary and Edmonton both have ring roads that encircle the respective cities. The ring roads are constructed to a freeway standard and function as both east–west and north–south trade corridors. There are also sections of the ring roads that are included as part specific corridors.

=== Calgary Ring Road ===
Highway 201 Stoney Trail Tsuut'ina Trail
- Location: Calgary
- Length: 101 km (63 mi)

The Calgary Ring Road, designated as Highway 201 and known as both Stoney Trail and Tsuut'ina Trail for the section passing through the Tsuu T'ina reserve, is 101 kilometres (63 mi) long is designated as a Core Route of the National Highway System. The northern section is included as part of the Highway 1 (Trans-Canada Highway) Corridor, despite not being signed as part of the Trans-Canada Highway, as a freeway alternative to 16 Avenue N (Highway 1) through Calgary, where the majority is an arterial road with numerous traffic signals. The eastern section is also included as part the CANAMEX Corridor as an alternative to Deerfoot Trail (Highway 2) through Calgary; both routes are freeways.

=== Edmonton Ring Road ===
Highway 216 Anthony Henday Drive
- Location: Edmonton
- Length: 78 km (48 mi)

The Edmonton Ring Road, designated as Highway 216 and known as Anthony Henday Drive, is 78 kilometres (48 mi) long is designated as a Core Route of the National Highway System. The northern section is included as part of the Highway 16 (Yellowhead Highway) Corridor as an alternative to Yellowhead Trail (Highway 16) through Edmonton. The southwestern section is also included as part the CANAMEX Corridor through Edmonton; Highway 2 follows Gateway Boulevard and Whitemud Drive through southwestern Edmonton, but is not included as part of the CANAMEX Corridor.

== See also ==
- Alberta Provincial Highway Network
- List of Alberta provincial highways
- List of former Alberta provincial highways
