= Bonnie Lake (Alberta) =

Lake in Alberta, Canada

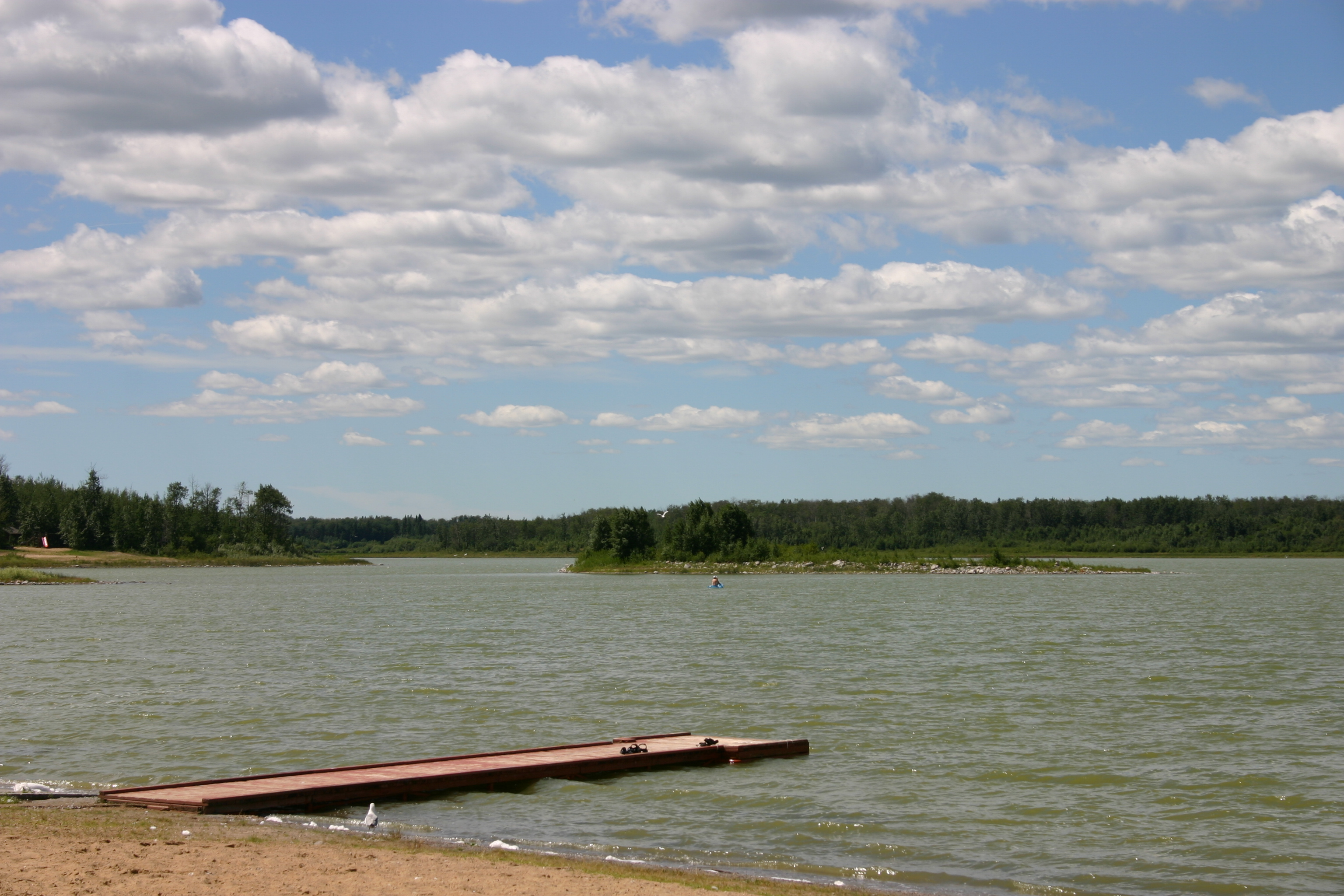

- Location within Alberta
- Location: Smoky Lake County, Alberta
- Coordinates: 54°09′03″N 111°51′50″W
- Lake type: Hyper-Eutrophic
- Primary outflows: Stony Creek
- Catchment area: 49.6 km^{2} (19.2 sq mi)
- Basin countries: Canada
- Max. length: 5 km (3.1 mi)
- Max. width: 1.2 km (0.75 mi)
- Surface area: 3.77 km^{2} (1.46 sq mi)
- Average depth: 3.1 m (10 ft)
- Max. depth: 6.1 m (20 ft)
- Surface elevation: 648 m (2,126 ft)

Bonnie Lake is a small lake in Alberta, Canada. It is located 6 km (3.7 mi) outside of Vilna, Alberta, north of Highway 28, and is part of the North Saskatchewan River basin.

The lake has a surface of 3.77 km^{2} (1.46 sq mi) and reaches a maximum depth of 6.1 m (20 ft), while the average depth is 3.1 m (10 ft). Bonnie Lake drains a total area of 49.6 km^{2} (19.2 sq mi). The lake drains through its south shore into Stony Creek which empties into the North Saskatchewan River.
