= Miya Turnbull =

Canadian artist

Miya Turnbull is an artist based in Halifax, Nova Scotia, Canada. She is of Japanese and Canadian ancestry and uses this to explore her identity in her work. Her work consists of photography, video, projection, and masks. Miya has had several installations around Canada and internationally. Miya's mask work has been inspired by quotes from Joseph Campbell and Andre Berthiaume.

== Early life ==
Turnbull grew up on a small farm near Onoway, Alberta. Though she often visited her grandparents in Lethbridge where she was immersed to her Japanese culture. This consisted of cooking, family gatherings, and language exposure. Miya is a fourth generation Japanese Canadian and currently identifies as "half-japanese" or "Hapa."

== Education and career ==
In 2000, she earned her B.F.A of Fine Arts from University of Lethbridge. There, she worked with sculpting, photography, printmaking, and painting. At the university, she gained permission to take a mask making class where she learned the foundation for her later art pieces. During Turnbull's time in Montreal, she also audited an Introduction to Art Therapy Class at Concordia University. Two years later, she moved from Montreal to Halifax, Nova Scotia to begin her career. Since 2003, she has facilitated youth oriented visual art workshops in art organizations and schools in Nova Scotia. Turnbull has also received three grants from the Nova Scotia Department of Tourism, Culture and Heritage. Miya married her husband Jake, in 2007 after meeting fifteen years prior. They had a child named Azalea in 2008.
