= Garner Lake (Alberta) =

Lake in Alberta, Canada

- Location within Alberta
- Location: Smoky Lake County / County of St. Paul No. 19, Alberta
- Coordinates: 54°11′54″N 111°43′47″W
- Basin countries: Canada
- Max. length: 3 km (1.9 mi)
- Max. width: 2.5 km (1.6 mi)
- Surface area: 6.19 km^{2} (2.39 sq mi)
- Average depth: 8.1 m (27 ft)
- Max. depth: 15.2 m (50 ft)
- Surface elevation: 617 m (2,024 ft)
- References: Garner Lake

Garner Lake is a lake in Alberta. It is part of Garner Lake Provincial Park.
