= Garner Lake Provincial Park =

Provincial park in Alberta, Canada

- Location within Alberta
- Interactive map of Garner Lake Provincial Park
- Location: Smoky Lake County, Alberta, Canada
- Nearest city: Vilna
- Coordinates: 54°10′57″N 111°44′41″W
- Area: 0.9 km^{2} (0.35 sq mi)
- Established: July 14, 1953
- Governing body: Alberta Tourism, Parks and Recreation

Garner Lake Provincial Park is a provincial park around Garner Lake in Alberta, Canada.

Garner Orchid Fen Natural Area is an extension of the park.

== Activities ==
The following activities are available in the park:

- Beach activities (swimming, volleyball, water-skiing and windsurfing)
- Camping
- Canoeing and kayaking
- Cross-country skiing (6 kilometres (3.7 mi) of non-groomed trails)
- Fishing and ice fishing
- Front country hiking
- Mountain biking
- Power boating
- Sailing

== See also ==
- List of provincial parks in Alberta
- List of Canadian provincial parks
- List of National Parks of Canada
