= Coronado, Alberta =

Locality in Alberta, Canada

Coordinates: 53.88345°N 113.30201°W

Coronado is a locality in Alberta, Canada.

The community takes its name from Coronado, California.
