= Waskatenau =

- Village
- Village of Waskatenau
- Location of Waskatenau
- Coordinates: 54°05′51″N 112°47′4″W
- Country: Canada
- Province: Alberta
- Region: Central Alberta
- Census Division: 12
- Municipal district: Smoky Lake County
- Incorporated
  - Village: May 19, 1932

Government
  - Mayor: Brian Zatorski
  - Governing body: Waskatenau Village Council

Area (2021)
  - Land: 0.59 km^{2} (0.23 sq mi)
- Elevation: 362 m (1,188 ft)

Population (2021)
  - Total: 247
  - Density: 421.1/km^{2} (1,091/sq mi)
- Time zone: UTC−06:00 (Alberta Time)
- Highways: 28; 831
- Waterways: North Saskatchewan River
- Website: Official website

Waskatenau ( /wəˈsɛtnə/ wə-SET-nə) is a village in central Alberta, Canada. It is surrounded by Smoky Lake County, approximately 90 km (56 mi) northeast of Edmonton. Waskatenau is a Cree word meaning "opening in the bank" in reference to the clef in the nearby ridge through which the Waskatenau Creek flows. It is pronounced WAS-ET-NA, with a silent "k."

== Demographics ==
In the 2021 Census of Population conducted by Statistics Canada, the Village of Waskatenau had a population of 247 living in 118 of its 138 total private dwellings, a change of 32.8% from its 2016 population of 186. With a land area of 0.59 km^{2} (0.23 sq mi), it had a population density of 418.6/km^{2} (1,084.3/sq mi) in 2021.

In the 2016 Census of Population conducted by Statistics Canada, the Village of Waskatenau recorded a population of 186 living in 99 of its 129 total private dwellings, a −27.1% change from its 2011 population of 255. With a land area of 0.6 km^{2} (0.23 sq mi), it had a population density of 310.0/km^{2} (802.9/sq mi) in 2016.

== Home Run For Life softball marathons ==
Waskatenau is known for its repeated efforts to set a world record for the longest continuous game of softball. The town held three such softball marathons, known as the "Home Run For Life", as fundraisers for the Cross Cancer Institute and Stollery Children's Hospital in Edmonton. In late June 2005, the first marathon went for 60 hours and 4 minutes and raised $75,000, unofficially holding the world record for less than 1 day before a team in Quebec broke it. Waskatenau tried again in 2007, and played for 108 hours and 3 minutes from June 27 to July 1, raising over $91,000. However, the Guinness Book of World Records disallowed the record for technical reasons. Finally, in 2009, Home Run For Life III successfully set the official, Guinness-approved record for the "longest game of softball", playing 115 hours and 3 minutes from June 30 to July 5, and raising more than $110,000.

== History ==
The 1880s name for the area was Wah-Sat-now after the nearby cleft as mentioned above. The Wah-Sat-Now (Cree) band in residence there in the 1880s later forced to the Saddle Lake reserve.

The new spelling Waskatenau was in common use by 1920, decided by settlers. About that time a CNR line was built from Edmonton to St. Paul. Waskatenau was the station built between Radway and Warspite.

The Village of Waskatenau was incorporated on May 19, 1932.

== See also ==
- List of communities in Alberta
- List of francophone communities in Alberta
- List of villages in Alberta
