= Beaver Crossing, Alberta =

Beaver Crossing
- Hamlet
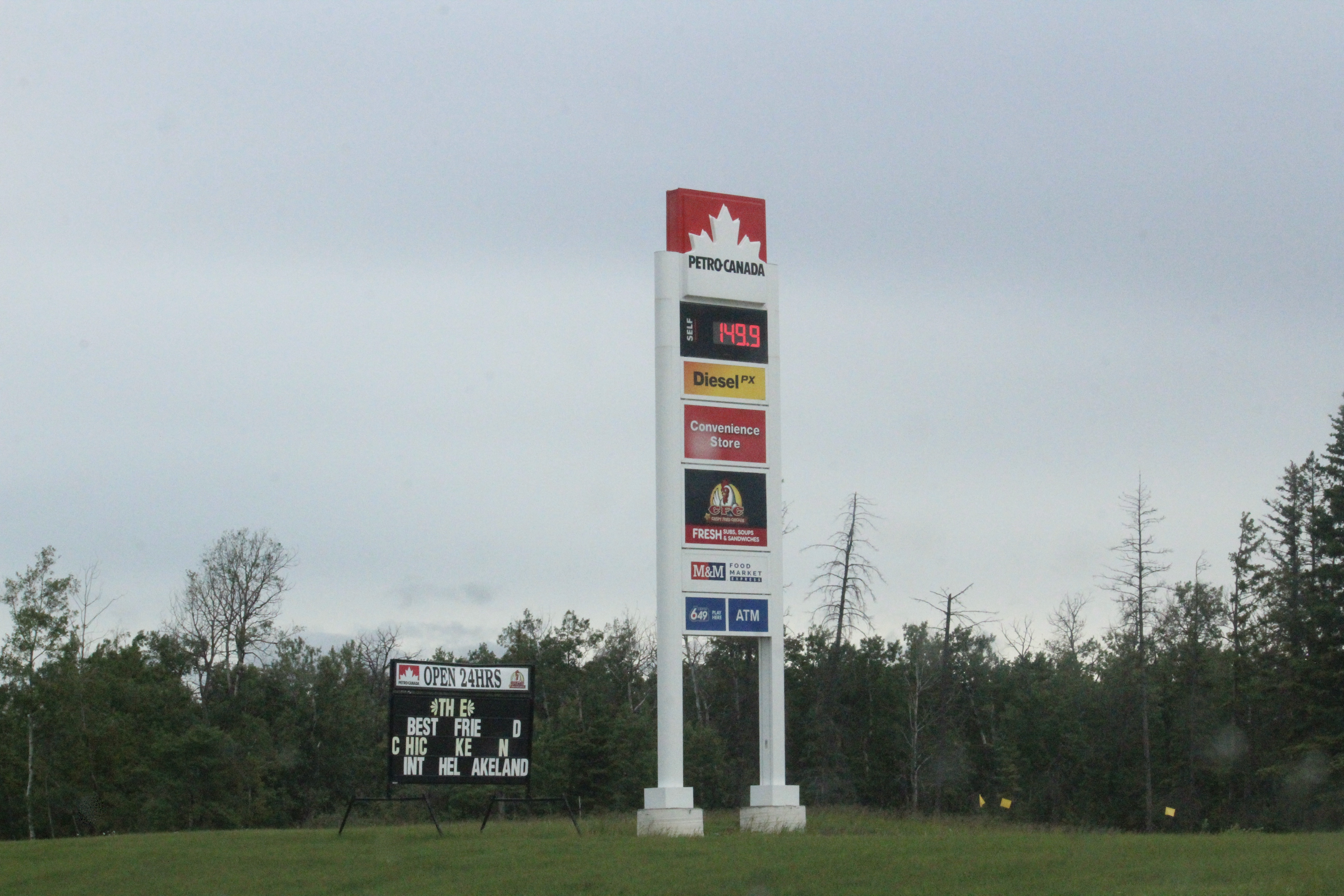

- Location of Beaver Crossing Beaver Crossing (Canada)
- Coordinates: 54°21′38″N 110°12′24″W
- Country: Canada
- Province: Alberta
- Region: Central Alberta
- Census division: 12
- Municipal district: Municipal District of Bonnyville No. 87

Government
  - Type: Unincorporated
  - Governing body: Municipal District of Bonnyville No. 87 Council

Population (1991)
  - Total: 18
- Time zone: UTC−06:00 (Alberta Time)
- Area codes: 780, 587, 825

Beaver Crossing is a hamlet in central Alberta, Canada within the Municipal District of Bonnyville No. 87, located on Highway 28 where it crosses the Beaver River, approximately 12 kilometres (7.5 mi) south of Cold Lake. Near here was Cold Lake House built by the Montreal traders in 1781.

== Demographics ==
Beaver Crossing recorded a population of 18 in the 1991 Census of Population conducted by Statistics Canada.

== See also ==
- List of communities in Alberta
- List of hamlets in Alberta
