= Vilna, Alberta =

Vilna
- Village
- Village of Vilna
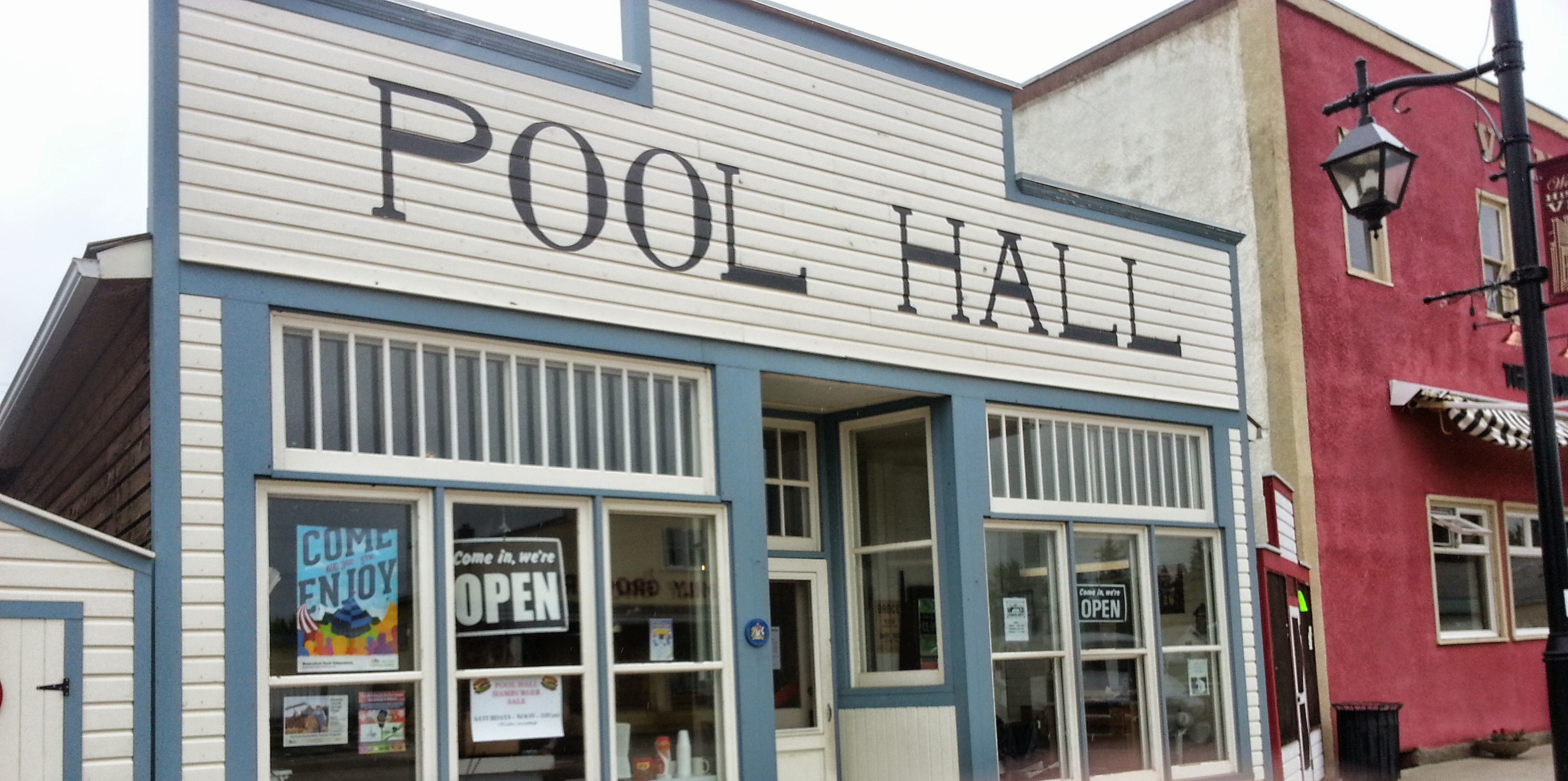
- Pool hall and barbershop

- Location of Vilna
- Coordinates: 54°06′56″N 111°55′16″W
- Country: Canada
- Province: Alberta
- Region: Central Alberta
- Census Division: No. 12
- Municipal district: Smoky Lake County
- Founded: 1907
- Incorporated
  - Village: June 23, 1923

Government
  - Mayor: Leroy kunyk
  - Villiage council: Tammy-Lynn thompson, Jenn trider

Area (2021)
  - Land: 0.96 km^{2} (0.37 sq mi)
- Elevation: 640 m (2,100 ft)

Population (2021)
  - Total: 268
  - Density: 278/km^{2} (720/sq mi)
- Time zone: UTC−06:00 (Alberta Time)
- Highways: Highway 28; Highway 859
- Waterways: Bonnie Lake, Stony Creek
- Website: Official website

Vilna is a village in central Alberta, Canada.

Vilna is located in Smoky Lake County, on Highway 28, 150 km (93.2 mi) northeast of the city of Edmonton. Bonnie Lake Provincial Recreation Area is located 6 km (3.7 mi) north of the community, on the shores of Bonnie Lake.

== History ==
Vilna was founded in 1907, mostly by central European settlers. By 1918, the settlers were calling the larger district Vilna, after the Lithuanian capital city of Vilnius (Latin: Vilna). The main community started to coalesce in 1919, when the railroad reached the area and the first grain elevator was built. The "Villette" post office, located two miles east, was relocated to the growing community in 1920, at which time the community was officially named Vilna. That same year, the first schoolhouse was built. Vilna was incorporated as a village on June 13, 1923.

On February 5, 1967, Vilna experienced a meteor air burst with a yield estimated at 600 tonnes of TNT (2.5 TJ). Subsequently, two very small meteorite fragments were found – 48 milligrams (0.74 grains) and 94 milligrams (1.45 gr) which are now stored at University of Alberta, in Edmonton.

== Demographics ==
In the 2021 Census of Population conducted by Statistics Canada, the Village of Vilna had a population of 268 living in 108 of its 119 total private dwellings, a change of −7.6% from its 2016 population of 290. With a land area of 0.96 km^{2} (0.37 sq mi), it had a population density of 279.2/km^{2} (723.0/sq mi) in 2021.

In the 2016 Census of Population conducted by Statistics Canada, the Village of Vilna recorded a population of 290 living in 114 of its 143 total private dwellings, a 16.5% change from its 2011 population of 249. With a land area of 0.96 km^{2} (0.37 sq mi), it had a population density of 302.1/km^{2} (782.4/sq mi) in 2016.

The Village of Vilna's 2012 municipal census counted a population of 290.

== Attractions ==
The town claims to be home to the world's largest metal sculpture mushroom.

== See also ==
- List of communities in Alberta
- List of villages in Alberta
