= Ashmont, Alberta =

Hamlet in northern Alberta, Canada

Ashmont
- Hamlet
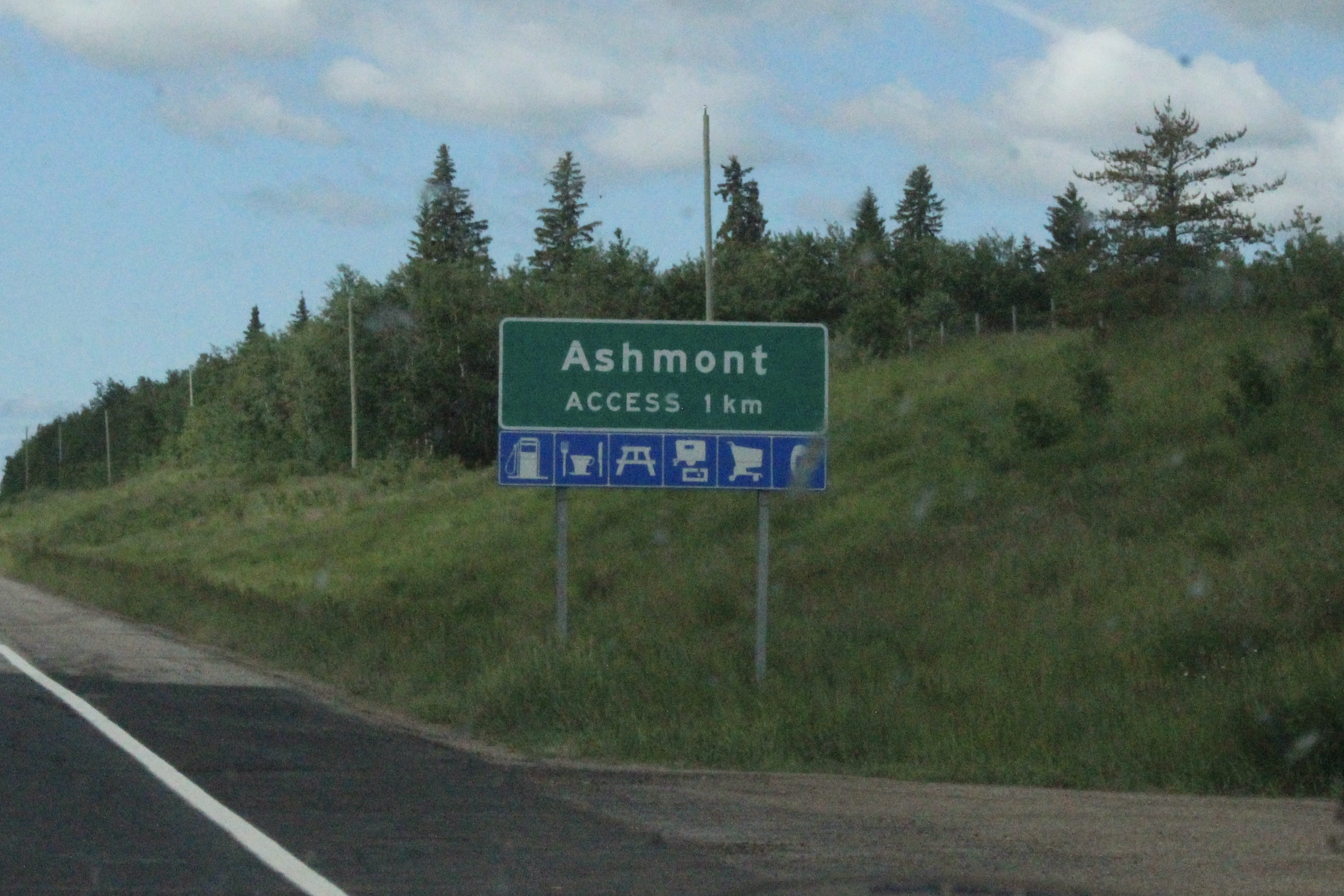

- Location of Ashmont in Alberta
- Coordinates: 54°07′45″N 111°34′05″W
- Country: Canada
- Province: Alberta
- Census division: No. 19
- Municipal district: County of St. Paul No. 19

Area (2021)
  - Land: 1.11 km^{2} (0.43 sq mi)

Population (2021)
  - Total: 125
  - Density: 112.2/km^{2} (291/sq mi)
- Time zone: UTC−06:00 (Alberta Time)

Ashmont is a hamlet in northern Alberta, Canada within the County of St. Paul No. 19. It is located near the intersection of Highway 28 and Highway 36, approximately 33 kilometres (21 mi) northwest of the Town of St. Paul. It has an elevation is 2,073 feet (632 m).

Ashmont is surrounded by numerous lakes, such as Lower Mann Lakes, Upper Mann Lake, Batty Lake, Lottie Lake, Floatingstone Lake and Garner Lake. Many provincial recreation areas are established on the shores of these lakes.

A first settler named the community after his native home in Ashmont, Boston. Ashmont began as a farming community in the early part of the 20th century. At its peak in the 1960s it boasted a grain elevator, four general stores, a pool hall, Legion Hall, two gas stations and a school. As is typical of many small rural communities it has fallen on hard times. Only one store remains, kept alive by the local lake communities and a relatively large school (K to 12).

== Demographics ==
Population history of Ashmont
Year	Pop.	±%
1941	106	—
1951	146	+37.7%
1956	187	+28.1%
1961	152	−18.7%
1966	156	+2.6%
1971	150	−3.8%
1976	119	−20.7%
1981	196	+64.7%
1986	222	+13.3%
1991	202	−9.0%
1991A	200	−1.0%
1996	176	−12.0%
2001	160	−9.1%
2006	149	−6.9%
2011	188	+26.2%
2016	133	−29.3%
2021	125	−6.0%
Source: Statistics Canada

In the 2021 Census of Population conducted by Statistics Canada, Ashmont had a population of 125 living in 51 of its 59 total private dwellings, a change of −6% from its 2016 population of 133. With a land area of 1.11 km^{2} (0.43 sq mi), it had a population density of 112.6/km^{2} (291.7/sq mi) in 2021.

As a designated place in the 2016 Census of Population conducted by Statistics Canada, Ashmont had a population of 133 living in 47 of its 65 total private dwellings, a change of −29.3% from its 2011 population of 188. With a land area of 1.11 km^{2} (0.43 sq mi), it had a population density of 119.8/km^{2} (310.3/sq mi) in 2016.

== See also ==
- List of communities in Alberta
- List of designated places in Alberta
- List of hamlets in Alberta
