= Namao, Alberta =

Namao
- Hamlet
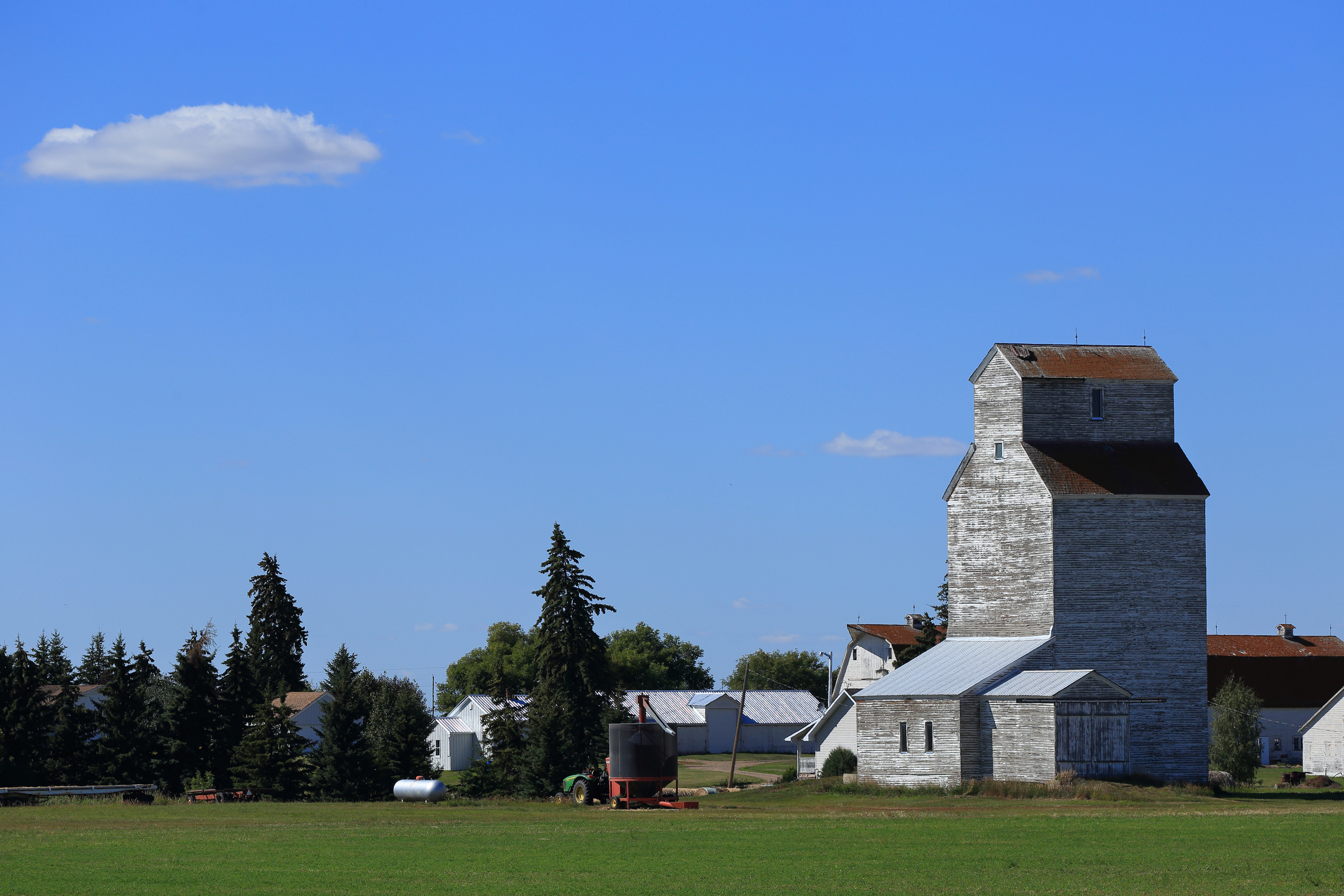

- Location of Namao Namao (Canada)
- Coordinates: 53°42′58″N 113°29′32″W
- Country: Canada
- Province: Alberta
- Region: Edmonton Metropolitan Region
- Census division: 11
- Municipal district: Sturgeon County

Government
  - Type: Unincorporated
  - Governing body: Sturgeon County Council

Population (2010)
  - Total: 10
- Time zone: UTC−06:00 (Alberta Time)
- Area codes: 780, 587, 825

Namao (/nəˈmeɪ.oʊ/) is a hamlet in central Alberta, Canada within Sturgeon County. It is at the intersection of Highway 37 and Highway 28, approximately 7 kilometres (4.3 mi) north of Edmonton's city limits. It was the namesake of RCAF Station Namao, now CFB Edmonton, which is directly south of the hamlet.

== History ==
On August 22, 1891, the Edmonton Bulletin reported that, "The Sturgeon river settlers had been requesting a post office since May 3, 1884. They had wanted to call it Wilson Valley at first, then Sturgeon and finally Naoma (Namao)." It opened on April 12, 1892. According to Wilfred McLean, Dan [McKinley, who took up one of the first Sturgeon homesteads in the early 1880s] insisted on the name; "[He] had associated with the Indians for quite a few years and knew quite a few Cree words.", The name is derived from the Cree word ᓇᒣᐤ (namêw), meaning "sturgeon".

On May 19, 1892, Postmaster J. Johnstone wrote that "'Nemao' is the correct spelling of the name of the post office in the Sturgeon river settlement."

== Demographics ==
The population of Namao according to the 2010 municipal census conducted by Sturgeon County is 10.

== Climate ==
Climate data for Namao (CFB Namao) WMO ID: 71121; coordinates 53°40′N 113°28′W; elevation: 687.9 m (2,257 ft); 1971–2000 normals
Month	Jan	Feb	Mar	Apr	May	Jun	Jul	Aug	Sep	Oct	Nov	Dec	Year
Record high humidex	9.8	13.0	16.1	28.9	34.9	38.4	37.8	41.5	36.2	27.8	18.9	12.8	41.5
Record high °C (°F)	10.0 (50.0)	13.9 (57.0)	16.3 (61.3)	29.6 (85.3)	31.9 (89.4)	33.9 (93.0)	33.9 (93.0)	33.9 (93.0)	32.8 (91.0)	28.4 (83.1)	18.9 (66.0)	10.6 (51.1)	33.9 (93.0)
Mean daily maximum °C (°F)	−7.6 (18.3)	−5.3 (22.5)	1.3 (34.3)	10.6 (51.1)	17.3 (63.1)	20.5 (68.9)	22.2 (72.0)	21.4 (70.5)	16.3 (61.3)	10.5 (50.9)	−0.6 (30.9)	−6.2 (20.8)	8.4 (47.1)
Daily mean °C (°F)	−12.1 (10.2)	−10.1 (13.8)	−3.5 (25.7)	4.8 (40.6)	11.1 (52.0)	14.7 (58.5)	16.5 (61.7)	15.6 (60.1)	10.5 (50.9)	4.9 (40.8)	−4.9 (23.2)	−10.6 (12.9)	3.1 (37.6)
Mean daily minimum °C (°F)	−16.6 (2.1)	−14.8 (5.4)	−8.2 (17.2)	−1.1 (30.0)	4.8 (40.6)	8.8 (47.8)	10.8 (51.4)	9.7 (49.5)	4.7 (40.5)	−0.7 (30.7)	−9.1 (15.6)	−15.0 (5.0)	−2.2 (28.0)
Record low °C (°F)	−42.2 (−44.0)	−38.0 (−36.4)	−35.0 (−31.0)	−23.3 (−9.9)	−7.2 (19.0)	−1.1 (30.0)	2.8 (37.0)	−2.0 (28.4)	−7.8 (18.0)	−24.5 (−12.1)	−35.4 (−31.7)	−39.2 (−38.6)	−42.2 (−44.0)
Record low wind chill	−57.1	−51.3	−45.9	−30.8	−14.2	−4.9	0.0	−4.6	−15.5	−35.4	−52.8	−56.4	−57.1
Average precipitation mm (inches)	19.7 (0.78)	14.0 (0.55)	17.3 (0.68)	20.2 (0.80)	44.7 (1.76)	88.6 (3.49)	95.7 (3.77)	74.8 (2.94)	39.6 (1.56)	16.4 (0.65)	14.3 (0.56)	21.0 (0.83)	466.3 (18.36)
Average rainfall mm (inches)	1.3 (0.05)	0.5 (0.02)	1.7 (0.07)	8.3 (0.33)	40.9 (1.61)	88.6 (3.49)	95.7 (3.77)	74.7 (2.94)	37.9 (1.49)	9.9 (0.39)	1.8 (0.07)	1.0 (0.04)	362.3 (14.26)
Average snowfall cm (inches)	21.7 (8.5)	17.2 (6.8)	17.3 (6.8)	13.0 (5.1)	3.6 (1.4)	0.0 (0.0)	0.0 (0.0)	0.2 (0.1)	1.8 (0.7)	7.0 (2.8)	15.4 (6.1)	23.7 (9.3)	120.9 (47.6)
Average precipitation days (≥ 0.2 mm)	10.2	8.4	7.8	6.7	10.4	15.1	14.3	13.1	10.0	6.6	7.8	10.2	120.4
Average rainy days (≥ 0.2 mm)	0.76	0.76	1.1	4.2	10.0	15.1	14.3	13.1	9.6	4.5	1.5	1.0	76.0
Average snowy days (≥ 0.2 cm)	10.3	8.4	7.1	3.8	0.84	0.0	0.0	0.08	0.92	2.9	7.1	10.2	51.7
Average relative humidity (%) (at 1500)	68.0	64.6	61.4	45.5	41.1	49.3	54.6	54.5	53.3	50.2	66.8	70.3	56.6
Source: Environment and Climate Change Canada

== See also ==
- List of communities in Alberta
- List of hamlets in Alberta
