= Cherry Grove, Alberta =

Cherry Grove
- Hamlet
- Location of Cherry Grove in Alberta
- Coordinates: 54°21′N 110°04′W
- Country: Canada
- Province: Alberta
- Region: Central Alberta
- Census division: 12
- Municipal district: M.D. of Bonnyville No. 87
- Elevation: 550 m (1,800 ft)

Population (2014)
  - Total: 405
- Time zone: UTC−06:00 (Alberta Time)
- Postal code span: T0A 0T0
- Area code: 780
- NTS Map: 073L08

Cherry Grove is a hamlet in central Alberta, Canada within the Municipal District of Bonnyville No. 87. It is 1 km (0.62 mi) north of Highway 55, approximately 12 km (7.5 mi) southeast of Cold Lake.

== Community ==
Cherry Grove is a rural community serving the surrounding agricultural area. Community facilities include the Cherry Grove Community Hall, a community rink, and rodeo grounds operated by the Cherry Grove Agricultural Society. The community rink is maintained by local volunteers and is available for public use.

The community hosts the annual Cherry Grove Lawn Tractor Races, organized by the Cherry Grove Agricultural Society. The event features multiple racing classes and family-oriented activities.

The hamlet is home to a congregation of The Church of Jesus Christ of Latter-day Saints.

The Bonnyville Regional Fire Authority operates Station 10 – Cherry Grove, which began emergency response operations on December 3, 2025. The station serves Cherry Grove and the surrounding area.

== History ==
On April 28, 2023, a fire destroyed the Cherry Grove meetinghouse of The Church of Jesus Christ of Latter-day Saints. Firefighters from several surrounding communities responded to the incident, which resulted in the building being declared a complete loss. The fire was investigated as suspicious by the Bonnyville Regional Fire Authority and the Royal Canadian Mounted Police.

A new meetinghouse was later completed, with the Cherry Grove congregation holding its first worship service in the new building in April 2026.

== Demographics ==
The population of Cherry Grove according to the 2014 municipal census conducted by the Municipal District of Bonnyville No. 87 is 405.

== See also ==
- List of communities in Alberta
- List of hamlets in Alberta
