= Alberta Numbered Highway Network =

Highway network of Alberta, Canada

- Highway markers for Highway 1, Highway 2, and Highway 519

- Network as of April 2025

System information
- Maintained by TEC
- Length: 31,400 km (19,500 mi)
- Formed: c. 1934

Highway names
- Types: Core: Highway 1–216; X: Highway 1X–43X; Local/Rural: Highway 500–986

System links
- Alberta Numbered Highway Network; List; Former

The Alberta Numbered Highway Network is the provincial highway network of Alberta, Canada, consisting of all the roads, bridges, and interchanges that are managed and maintained by the Ministry of Transportation and Economic Corridors (TEC), a department within the Government of Alberta. The network is extensive and one of the largest highway networks in Canada, with over 64,000 lane kilometres of roads (equivalent to 31,400 kilometres [19,500 mi]) and over 4,900 bridges and interchanges making up the network. Additionally, around 58,000 lane kilometres (equivalent to 28,400 kilometres [17,600 mi]) of the roads in the network are paved, while the remaining roads are unpaved. The longest highway in the network is Highway 2 with a total length of 1,273 kilometres (791 mi), while the shortest is a segment of Highway 3A allowing access to West Lethbridge, at a length of 0.65 kilometres (0.40 mi).

The broader road network within the province, including roads within its highway network, has a total length of over 473,000 kilometres (294,000 mi) of single-lane equivalent roads as of April 2018.

== Regulations ==
In Alberta, all public and private roads are legally considered highways under the Traffic Safety Act (TSA). The TSA sets forth the traffic regulations and the rules of the road that regulate and control the use of the road infrastructure within the province, including major highways. Additionally, the definition of highway as defined in the Act is broad in nature, with "any thoroughfare, street, road, trail, avenue, parkway, driveway, viaduct, lane, alley, square, bridge, causeway, trestleway or other place or any part of any of them, whether publicly or privately owned, that the public is ordinarily entitled or permitted to use for the passage or parking of vehicles" being defined as a highway and therefore subject to the Act and its related regulations. The Highways Development and Protection Act (HDPA) additionally sets the regulations and responsibilities of the Government of Alberta regarding all roads and highways under its ownership and authority.

Speed limits on provincial highways are regulated by the Traffic Safety Act, and vary between 50 and 100 kilometres per hour (31–62 mph) depending on the type of highway. However, divided highways usually have a set speed of 110 km/h (68 mph).

On April 29, 2026, the Ministry of Transportation and Economic Corridors launched a pilot project on a 22 km (14 mi) portion of Highway 2 south of Leduc wherein the speed limit was increased to 120 km/h (75 mph), with the intent to expand the increased speed limit to additional divided highways if the project is successful.

== Classification ==
The Numbered Highway Network comprises two distinct series, or types, of highways. The 1 to 216 series of highways serve as the highway network's primary travel routes and are the most active routes in terms of traffic, while the 500 to 986 series serves as the network's secondary travel routes and serve as the province's local and rural routes, with them seeing less traffic than the primary travel routes.

=== 1–216 series ===
The 1 to 216 series within Alberta's numbered highway network serve as the network's primary travel routes, and are identified with route markers that have the number of the route inside of a shield, with the exception of Highway 1 and Highway 16, as they are the travel routes within the highway network that form the Alberta portion of the Trans-Canada Highway (TCH), Canada's transcontinental highway system. As a result, these highways are identified by green-coloured route markers, with the number of the route being inside of a white maple leaf. Highway 1 serves as the primary travel route within the TCH, while Highway 16 serves as the alternative route. They are the only major primary highway routes in the province to be given the designation, with the rest of the highways in the network remaining as standard provincial highways.

All highways within the series use the numbering range of 1 to 100, with the exception of Highway 201 and Highway 216, otherwise known as Stoney Trail and Anthony Henday Drive, respectively; these highways serve as the respective ring roads for Calgary and Edmonton and are therefore given numbers outside of the standard numbering range.

Several highways within the series are additionally a part of Canada's National Highway System (NHS) and form the Alberta portion of the NHS. They are designated as one of three types of routes: core routes, feeder routes, and northern and remote routes. Most highways within the Alberta portion of the NHS carrying these designations typically carry them for their entire length, while some highways only carry the aforementioned designations for specific portions or segments along their total length.

==== National Highway System routes ====
The following highways form the Alberta portion of the National Highway System, for a total of sixteen highways and a total length of 4,545 kilometres (2,824 mi), with some routes within the system additionally being a part of the CANAMEX corridor linking Canada to Mexico through the United States:

- Highway 1 (TCH; entire route)
- Highway 2 (partial route; CANAMEX corridor)
- Highway 3 (entire route)
- Highway 4 (entire route; CANAMEX corridor)
- Highway 9 (entire route)
- Highway 15 (partial route)
- Highway 16 (TCH; entire route)
- Highway 28 (entire route)
- Highway 28A (entire route)
- Highway 35 (entire route)
- Highway 43 (entire route; CANAMEX corridor)
- Highway 49 (partial route)
- Highway 58 (Northern and Remote; partial route)
- Highway 63 (partial route)
- Highway 201 (entire route; Calgary ring road)
- Highway 216 (entire route; Edmonton ring road)

=== 500–986 series ===
The 500 to 986 series of highways within Alberta's numbered highway network are typically considered to be secondary travel routes as well as local and/or rural highways. These highways form the remainder of the numbered highway network after the 1 to 216 series, and are identified with route markers that have the route number inside of an oval shape. They are divided into three sub-series:

- The 500 and 600 series of highways go in the east–west direction, where the numbering of the highways increase northward from the Montana border to the Northwest Territories border.
- The 700 to 800 series of highways go in the north–south direction, where numbering increases eastward from the British Columbia border to the Saskatchewan border.
- The 900 series of highways are newer or planned highways that have been established for future consideration as potential extensions or realignments of highways within the 1–216 series.

Some highways in the 500 to 986 series are paved, while others are partially or completely gravel. Speed limits on these highways vary, ranging from 80 km/h (50 mph) to 100 km/h (62 mph).

== History ==
In April 1918, Bill 37, entitled "An Act to provide for a System of Highways in the Province", was passed, establishing the basis of a true highway network within the province. It designated all public roads within the province as highways, including trails. As part of this, highways were split into three separate classifications: main highways, district highways, and local highways. Main highways were considered crucial highways necessary for the effective means of transport between more important cities and towns within the province; district highways were highways considered to be important locally; and local highways were any remaining highways that were not classified as either main or district highways. However, the concept of highways within the province have existed since c. 1906.

In 1926, Alberta discontinued its system of marking highways with different colours in favour of a numbering system. By 1928, the year a gravel road stretched from Edmonton to the United States border, Alberta's provincial highway network comprised 2,310 km (1,440 mi).

Prior to 1973, the expanding highway system comprised one-digit and two-digit highways, with some numbers having letter suffixes (e.g., Highway 1X, Highway 26A). In 1973, a second highway system emerged, using three digits starting in the 500s and referred to as secondary roads, while the existing system continued to be referred to as provincial highways. In 1974, provincial highways became known as primary highways; and in 1990, secondary roads became known as secondary highways.

Secondary highways were abolished in 2000, with most becoming primary highways. The expanded primary highway system was divided into two subsets: former primary highways, which became the 1–216 series; and former secondary highways, which became the 500–986 series. In 2010, all highways became known as provincial highways, while maintaining the two numbered series. Despite this, the series are still often referred to as primary and secondary highways, respectively.

== See also ==
- Alberta economic corridors
- List of Alberta provincial highways
- List of former Alberta provincial highways
