= Hoselaw, Alberta =

Coordinates: 54°10′51″N 110°53′35″W

Location of Hoselaw Alberta

Hoselaw is an unincorporated community in northeast Alberta, Canada. The community was named for Loch Hoselaw in Roxburghshire, Scotland. Hoselaw is administered by the Municipal District of Bonnyville No. 87. Hoselaw is also the name of a lake in Alberta.
