= Gibbons, Alberta =

Settlement in Canada, incorporated 1959

Gibbons
- Town
- Town of Gibbons
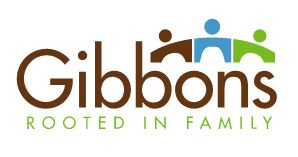
- Flag
- Motto: Rooted in Family
- Location of Gibbons in Alberta
- Coordinates: 53°49′40″N 113°19′22″W
- Country: Canada
- Province: Alberta
- Region: Edmonton Metropolitan Region
- Census division: 11
- Municipal district: Sturgeon County
- Incorporated
  - Village: January 1, 1959
  - Town: April 1, 1977

Government
  - Mayor: Dan Deck
  - Governing body: Gibbons Town Council
  - MP: Michael Cooper

Area (2021)
  - Land: 9.46 km^{2} (3.65 sq mi)
- Elevation: 643 m (2,110 ft)

Population (2021)
  - Total: 3,218
  - Density: 340.1/km^{2} (881/sq mi)
- Time zone: UTC−06:00 (Alberta Time)
- Postal code span: T0A 1N0
- Highways: Highway 28A; Highway 643
- Waterway: Sturgeon River
- Website: Official website

Gibbons is a town in central Alberta, Canada. It is located on Highway 28A, 37 km (23 mi) northeast of Edmonton.

Gibbons is situated on the southern banks of the Sturgeon River which is a major tributary of the North Saskatchewan River.

== Demographics ==
In the 2021 Census of Population conducted by Statistics Canada, the Town of Gibbons had a population of 3,218 living in 1,199 of its 1,291 total private dwellings, a change of 1.9% from its 2016 population of 3,159. With a land area of 9.46 km^{2} (3.65 sq mi), it had a population density of 340.2/km^{2} (881.0/sq mi) in 2021.

In the 2016 Census of Population conducted by Statistics Canada, the Town of Gibbons recorded a population of 3,159 living in 1,136 of its 1,223 total private dwellings, a 4.3% change from its 2011 population of 3,030. With a land area of 7.5 km^{2} (2.9 sq mi), it had a population density of 421.2/km^{2} (1,090.9/sq mi) in 2016.

== Sports and recreation ==
Gibbons is home to many sporting facilities, leagues, and teams. As a family community, the majority of activities are orientated to youth, but many adult options are also available.

The Gibbons arena is home to a number of ice hockey teams and leagues in the winter. In partnership with the community of Bon Accord, Alberta, the CNN Spurs minor hockey program offers teams from initiation to midget level, as well as a female program. The Gibbons Jr. C Broncos, playing in the Noralta Junior Hockey League, also call the Gibbons Arena home. The East Sturgeon Gentlemen's Hockey League, consisting of 11 teams, play the majority of their games in Gibbons as well as the surrounding communities.

Adjoining with the Gibbons Arena is the Gibbons Curling Club. This facility features four sheets of ice, ice-level seating, as well as a recently renovated lounge. The lounge, popular with the town's residents in the winter months, includes food and beverage service, table seating, and an above ice viewing area complete with sheet cameras. The facility runs men's, ladies', mixed, farmers', and junior leagues. It also hosts the annual Saville Country Classic Junior Bonspiel, where highly competitive junior level teams from across the province compete.

In the spring and summer, minor baseball and soccer teams are offered. The town has numerous soccer pitches and ball diamonds, with the majority of them located in the area surrounding Landing Trail School and at the Jack Hogg Sports Grounds north of Gibbons School and the Gibbons Arena. A successful recreational slow pitch league is also run, which includes an annual wind up tournament in July.

Lacrosse is also becoming increasingly popular with Gibbons' youth. Although the town does not yet host its own teams, the surrounding communities of Fort Saskatchewan, Sherwood Park, St. Albert, and Edmonton run programs for minor, junior, men's, and ladies' levels.

== Education ==
As part of the Sturgeon School Division, Gibbons is the site of the following schools: Landing Trail Elementary, Gibbons School Elementary and Junior High, and the Sturgeon Learning Centre, which focuses on high school and adult learning.

== See also ==
- List of communities in Alberta
- List of francophone communities in Alberta
- List of towns in Alberta
