= Bon Accord, Alberta =

Bon Accord
- Town
- Town of Bon Accord
- Flag

- Location of Bon Accord in Alberta
- Coordinates: 53°49′58″N 113°25′08″W
- Country: Canada
- Province: Alberta
- Region: Edmonton Metropolitan Region
- Census division: 11
- Municipal district: Sturgeon County
- Incorporated
  - Village: January 1, 1964
  - Town: November 20, 1979

Government
  - Mayor: Brian Holden
  - Governing body: Gamble
  - MP: Joe Mooney

Area (2021)
  - Land: 3.99 km^{2} (1.54 sq mi)
- Elevation: 625 m (2,051 ft)

Population (2021)
  - Total: 1,461
  - Density: 366.4/km^{2} (949/sq mi)
- Time zone: UTC−06:00 (Alberta Time)
- Area code: +1-780
- Highways: Highway 28
- Website: Official website

Bon Accord is a town in central Alberta, Canada. It is located 40 km (25 mi) north of downtown Edmonton on Highway 28. The name is derived from the French phrase "Bon Accord", the ancient motto of Aberdeen, Scotland, the ancestral home of a first settler, Sandy Florence.

The International Dark-Sky Association designated Bon Accord an International Dark Sky Community in August 2015 in recognition of the town's implementation of initiatives to preserve and enhance dark night skies over the community. It was the first community in Canada and eleventh in the world to earn this designation.

== Demographics ==
In the 2021 Census of Population conducted by Statistics Canada, the Town of Bon Accord had a population of 1,461 living in 555 of its 590 total private dwellings, a change of −4.4% from its 2016 population of 1,529. With a land area of 3.99 km^{2} (1.54 sq mi), it had a population density of 366.2/km^{2} (948.4/sq mi) in 2021.

In the 2016 Census of Population conducted by Statistics Canada, the Town of Bon Accord recorded a population of 1,529 living in 560 of its 578 total private dwellings, a 2.8% change from its 2011 population of 1,488. With a land area of 2.13 km^{2} (0.82 sq mi), it had a population density of 717.8/km^{2} (1,859.2/sq mi) in 2016.

== See also ==
- List of communities in Alberta
- List of francophone communities in Alberta
- List of towns in Alberta
