= Onoway =

- Town
- Town of Onoway
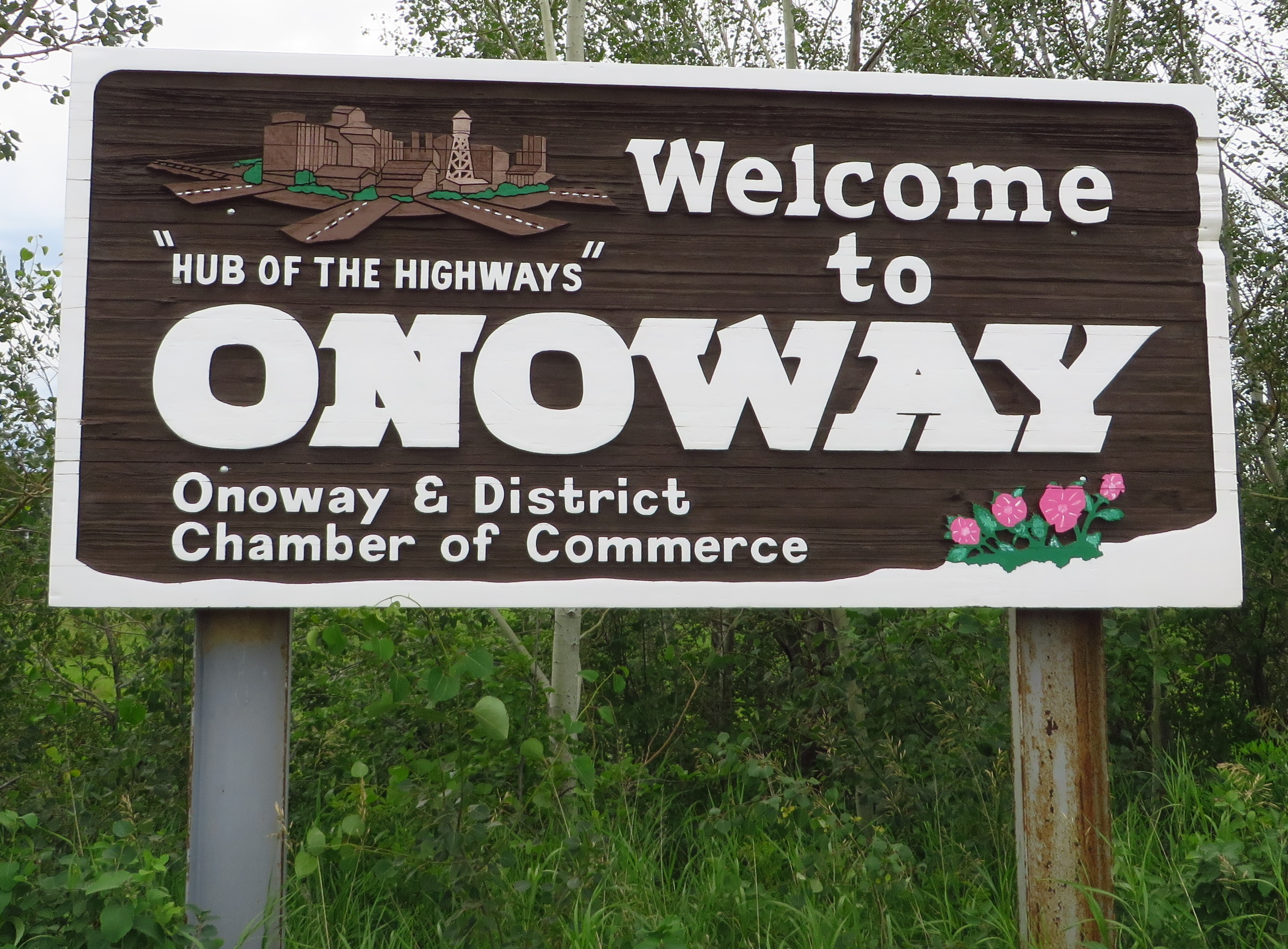
- Welcome sign
- Nickname: Hub of the Highways
- Location in Lac Ste. Anne County

- Location within Alberta
- Coordinates: 53°42′04″N 114°11′53″W
- Country: Canada
- Province: Alberta
- Planning region: Upper Athabasca
- Municipal district: Lac Ste. Anne County
- Incorporated
  - Village: June 25, 1923
  - Town: September 1, 2005

Government
  - Mayor: Bridgitte Coninx
  - Governing body: Onoway Town Council
  - MP: Michael Cooper
  - MLA: Shane Getson

Area (2021)
  - Land: 3.31 km^{2} (1.28 sq mi)

Population (2021)
  - Total: 966
  - Density: 292.1/km^{2} (757/sq mi)
- Time zone: UTC−06:00 (Alberta Time)
- Postal code span: T0E 1V0
- Area code: -1+780 -1+587
- Highways: Highway 43; Highway 37
- Waterway: Lac Ste. Anne; Sturgeon River
- Website: Official website

Onoway is a small town in central Alberta, Canada. It is approximately 60 km (37 mi) northwest of Edmonton at the junction of Highway 37 and Highway 43. The mayor is Bridgitte Coninx.

== History ==
Two theories are behind the naming of the community. "Onoway" in Chipewyan translates to "fair field" while the variant "onaway" is used in The Song of Hiawatha, a poem by Henry Wadsworth Longfellow. Onoway's post office was established in 1904. Onoway incorporated as a village on June 25, 1923. It incorporated as a town on September 1, 2005.

== Geography ==
The Canadian National Railway tracks run through the town, which is situated east of Lac Ste. Anne and south of the Sturgeon River.

== Demographics-and-land-mass ==
In the 2021 Census of Population conducted by Statistics Canada, the Town of Onoway had a population of 966 living in 360 of its 388 total private dwellings, a change of −6.1% from its 2016 population of 1,029. With a land area of 3.31 km^{2} (1.28 sq mi), it had a population density of 291.8/km^{2} (755.9/sq mi) in 2021.

In the 2016 Census of Population conducted by Statistics Canada, the Town of Onoway recorded a population of 1,029 living in 355 of its 374 total private dwellings, a −1% change from its 2011 population of 1,039. With a land area of 3.32 km^{2} (1.28 sq mi), it had a population density of 309.9/km^{2} (802.7/sq mi) in 2016.

== Attractions ==
Onoway hosts a weekend fair every June called "Heritage Days".

== Education ==
Onoway has an elementary school, serving 400 students in the local area as well as a junior and senior high school which has been open since the 1940s.

== Notable people ==
- Troy Bourke, ice hockey player
- Paxton Schulte, ice hockey player

== See also ==
- List of communities in Alberta
- List of towns in Alberta
