= Cypress County =

Municipal district in Alberta, Canada

- Municipal district
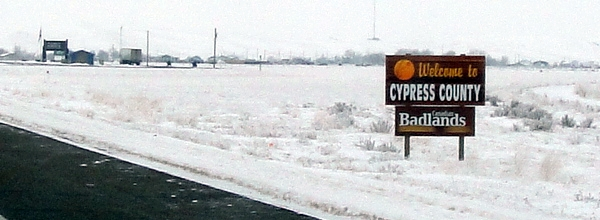
- Welcome sign

- Logo

- Location within Alberta
- Country: Canada
- Province: Alberta
- Region: Southern Alberta
- Census division: 1
- Established: 1985
- Incorporated: 1985

Government
  - Reeve: Dan Hamilton
  - Governing body: Cypress County Council
  - Administrative office: Dunmore

Area (2021)
  - Land: 12,977.99 km^{2} (5,010.83 sq mi)

Population (2021)
  - Total: 7,524
  - Density: 0.6/km^{2} (1.6/sq mi)
- Time zone: UTC−06:00 (Alberta Time)
- Website: cypress.ab.ca

Cypress County is a municipal district in southeastern Alberta, Canada that surrounds the City of Medicine Hat and the Town of Redcliff. The municipality is part of Census Division 1, Alberta. The first farm in the area was settled in 1890.

== Geography ==
The Cypress County landscape is dominated by a shortgrass prairie ecosystem. The land is flat to slightly rolling. The Cypress Hills region features mixed grasslands, wetlands and montane habitats. Major hydrological features include the South Saskatchewan and Milk rivers. Extensive coulee systems have formed adjacent to major rivers resulting in badlands terrain.

Near Walsh, Alberta at 50°0′38.2″N 110°6′48.3″W lies the Badlands Guardian. Here the landscape takes the form of a head wearing a feathered headdress. The head is approximately 300 metres (980 ft) wide and 25 metres (82 ft) deep. This unusual geographic feature is a result of natural erosion of the surrounding prairie.

=== Communities and localities ===
The following urban municipalities are surrounded by Cypress County.

Cities

- Medicine Hat

Towns

- Redcliff

Villages

- none

Summer villages

- none

The following hamlets are located within Cypress County.

Hamlets

- Desert Blume
- Dunmore
- Hilda
- Irvine
- Schuler
- Seven Persons
- Suffield
- Veinerville
- Walsh

The following localities are located within Cypress County.

Localities

- Agatha
- Alderson (dissolved from village status on January 31, 1936)
- Army Experimental Range
- Bain
- Bellcott
- Bowell
- Bowmanton
- Bulls Head
- Bullshead
- Carlstadt
- Cecil
- Craigower
- Cressday
- Dennis
- Eagle Butte
- Elkwater
- Fitzgerald
- Fox
- Illingworth
- Improvement District No. 1

- Jaydot
- Lamoral
- Larmour
- Little Plume
- Macson
- McNeill
- Onefour
- Pashley
- Pivot
- Ralston
- Ronalane
- Rosebeg
- Royal
- Roytal
- Stornham
- Thelma
- Tothill
- Vale
- Wild Horse
- Wisdom
- Woolchester

=== Climate ===
Cypress County has a semiarid climate with cold, dry winters and warm to hot summers. The winter cold is occasionally tempered by mild and dry chinook winds blowing from the west. Hot summer daytime temperatures are made tolerable by low humidity and rapid cooling in the evening hours. Maximum precipitation typically occurs in late spring and early summer.

== Demographics ==
In the 2021 Census of Population conducted by Statistics Canada, Cypress County had a population of 7,524 living in 2,658 of its 3,149 total private dwellings, a change of −1.8% from its 2016 population of 7,662. With a land area of 12,977.99 km^{2} (5,010.83 sq mi), it had a population density of 0.6/km^{2} (1.5/sq mi) in 2021.

In the 2016 Census of Population conducted by Statistics Canada, Cypress County had a population of 7,662 living in 2,689 of its 3,222 total private dwellings, a 6.2% change from its 2011 population of 7,214. With a land area of 13,173.25 km^{2} (5,086.22 sq mi), it had a population density of 0.6/km^{2} (1.5/sq mi) in 2016.

== Economy ==
Agriculture and the oil and gas industry are the primary economic activities within the county. Agricultural sectors include ranching, wheat and oil seed crops, irrigated alfalfa and other specialty crops. Irrigation water is supplied by the St. Mary River Irrigation District (SMRID) and other smaller water co-operatives. Oil and gas production is extensive throughout the county. Natural gas is gathered through pipe networks and processed in gas production plants near Hilda.

== Attractions ==
- Bullshead Reservoir - Camping, Fishing
- Cavan Lake Municipal Recreation Area - Camping, Boating, Fishing
- Cypress Hills Interprovincial Park - Camping, Boating, Fishing, Golfing, Swimming, Hiking, Rodeo, Winter Carnival, Skiing (Water, Downhill, Cross Country)
- Desert Blume Golf Club - Golfing
- Golden Sheaf Municipal Recreation Area - Boating, Fishing, Water Skiing, Camping
- Irvine Prairie Memories Museum - Local Historical Displays
- Michelle Reservoir - Camping, Fishing, Boating
- Murray Lake Reservoir - Fishing
- Reesor Lake - Camping, Fishing, Boating, Hiking
- Sandy Point Municipal Recreation Area - Camping, Fishing, Boating
- Spruce Coulee Reservoir - Camping, Fishing, Boating
- Cypress County Welcome Centre - Cypress County

== Government ==
=== Municipal ===
Cypress County has a Municipal Council of 9 elected Councillors. Councillors are elected by the eligible electors (Cypress County residents) who vote for a candidate in their electoral ward. Municipal elections organized by Alberta Municipal Affairs are held on the 3rd Monday in October every four years. Each October, the Councillors elect the Reeve and Deputy Reeve.

The Cypress County Council (elected in October 2021) consists of:

- Councillor Michelle McKenzie
- Councillor Blaine Brost
- Councillor Lloyd Want
- Councillor Robin Kurpjuweit
- Reeve Dan Hamilton
- Councillor Dustin Vossler
- Deputy Reeve Richard Oster
- Councillor Shane Hok
- Councillor Keith Ritz (elected in byelection February 2022)

=== Provincial ===
Cypress County is served by the Provincial Electoral Division of Cypress-Medicine Hat and represented in the Alberta Legislature by UCP MLA Justin Wright (politician).

=== Federal ===
Cypress County is served by the Federal Electoral Division of Medicine Hat—Cardston—Warner and represented in the House of Commons of Canada by Conservative MP Glen Motz.

=== Military ===
Cypress County is home to Canadian Forces Base Suffield. The base provides an extensive training area for both Canadian and British Armed Forces. Defence Research and Development Canada facilities are located here as well.

Fire Services

Cypress County Fire Services serves the entirety of Cypress County, excluding the city of Medicine Hat. They are a municipal paid-on-call fire department with 140 firefighters who respond to a yearly average of 250 calls for service. They have 9 fire halls located in Dunmore, Elkwater, Hilda, Irvine, One Four, Schuler, Seven Persons, and Walsh.

== Infrastructure ==
=== Transportation ===
Highways

The Trans-Canada Highway (1), Crowsnest Highway (3) and Highway 41 traverse Cypress County. The Trans-Canada enters the eastern part of the County near Walsh and travels west through Dunmore and on to Medicine Hat. From Medicine Hat the highway travels in a north westerly direction passing near Suffield and on to Calgary. Planning has begun to upgrade The Trans Canada to true freeway status. The Crowsnest highway enters the County near Seven Persons and travels in a north westerly direction to Medicine Hat. Highway 41 begins at the U.S. border (Port of Wild Horse) and passes through the county in a northerly direction. Highway 41 intersects the Trans Canada Highway near Dunmore and continues on in a northerly direction until it exits the County near Sandy Point Recreational Area at the county's most northerly limits.

Road network

Cypress County has developed and maintains an extensive road network within its municipal jurisdiction. Paved, oiled and graveled roads total more than 2700 km in length.

Rail

The Canadian Pacific Kansas City main line traverses Cypress County. The line enters the eastern part of the county near Walsh and travels west through Dunmore and on to Medicine Hat. From Medicine Hat the line travels in a north westerly direction passing near Suffield and on to Calgary. A secondary line joins the main at Dunmore and travels in a south westerly direction passing near Seven Persons and on to Lethbridge. Major switching yards are located in Dunmore. Several spur lines and side yards exist along the lines route to facilitate the handling of grain and other commodities.

=== Municipal services ===
Cypress County provides municipal services through various departments. Services include agricultural programs, road maintenance, bylaw enforcement, land use planning, development advice and approvals, fire protection, recreation, street lighting, waste collection, recycling, water and sewer, emergency services, and family and community support.

== Education ==
=== Secondary schools ===
The Prairie Rose School Division #8 serves the needs of public school students. Schools within this district include Eagle Butte High School, Burdett School, Bow Island Elementary, Senator Gershaw School, Parkside School, I. F. Cox School, Margaret Wooding School, Irvine School, Schuler School, Oyen Public School, New Brigden School, Ralston School, Seven Persons School, Beyond Walls Alternative Outreach School and Elkwater Hutterite Colony and six other colony schools. The division office is located in Dunmore.

The Medicine Hat Catholic Separate Regional School Division #20 serves the needs of Roman Catholic students. District schools located in Medicine Hat and Bow Island include McCoy High School, St. Mary's School, Notre-Dame Academy, St. Louis School, St. Francis Xavier School, St. Michael's School, Mother Teresa School and St. Patrick's School. The division office is located in Medicine Hat.

Christian Education K-12 is provided by Cornerstone Christian School.

=== Post-secondary education ===
The Medicine Hat College is a junior college located in Medicine Hat. The college offers university transfer programs, applied degrees and apprenticeship programs. Athletics include basketball, volleyball, and soccer.

== See also ==
- List of communities in Alberta
- List of municipal districts in Alberta
