= Eagle Butte =

Eagle Butte may refer to:

- Eagle Butte, South Dakota
- Eagle Butte, Alberta
- Eagle Butte (Nevada)
- Eagle Butte (Ziebach County, South Dakota)
- Eagle Butte crater
- Eagle Butte High School
- Eagle Butte Mine
