= Prairie Rose School Division No. 8 =

School district in the Canadian province of Alberta

Location
- 918 - 2nd Avenue; Dunmore, Alberta, Canada Canada

Other information
- Website: www.prrdweb.com

Prairie Rose School Division No. 8 is a public school authority within the Canadian province of Alberta operated out of Dunmore.

== Community Schools ==
- Bow Island Elementary School, Bow Island (K-3)
- Burdett School, Burdett (K-9)
- Eagle Butte High School, Dunmore (10-12)
- Foremost School, Foremost (K-12)
- I.F. Cox School, Redcliff (K-3)
- Irvine School, Irvine (K-9)
- Jenner School, Jenner (K-9)
- Margaret Wooding School, Redcliff (4-6)
- New Brigden School, New Brigden (K-5)
- Oyen Public School, Oyen (K-6)
- Parkside Jr. High School, Redcliff (7-9)
- Ralston School, Ralston (K-9)
- Schuler School, Schuler (K-9)
- Senator Gershaw School, Bow Island (4-12)
- Seven Persons School, Seven Persons (K-9)
- South Central High School, Oyen (7-12)
- Warren Peers School, Acadia Valley (K-9)

=== Alternative/Faith-based Schools ===
- CIS Akram Jomaa Campus, Calgary (K-12)
- CIS Omar Bin Al-Khattab Campus, Calgary (K-9)
- Coulee Collegiate, Medicine Hat
- Home Plus Learning Network
- Link School/CASA Classroom
- Prairie Mennonite School, Medicine Hat (K-9)
- South Alberta Remote High School
- South Alberta Collegiate

=== Colony Schools ===
- Acadia Colony School, Acadia Valley
- Baker Colony School, Etzikom
- Elkwater Colony School, Elkwater
- Jenner Colony School, Jenner
- Kingslake Colony School, Foremost
- Mayfield Colony School, Orion
- Meridian Colony School, Acadia Valley
- Murray Lake Colony School, Seven Persons
- Plainview Colony School, Foremost
- Ponderosa Colony School, Bow Island
- Prairie View Colony School, Oyen
- Rosebank Colony School, Skiff
- Rosedale Colony School, Etzikom
- Roseglen Colony School, Hilda
- Shamrock Colony School, Bow Island
- Silver Sage Colony School, Orion
- Starbrite Colony School, Foremost
- Sunrise Colony School, Foremost
- Winnifred Colony School, Burdett

== See also ==
- List of school authorities in Alberta
