= Eagle Butte High School =

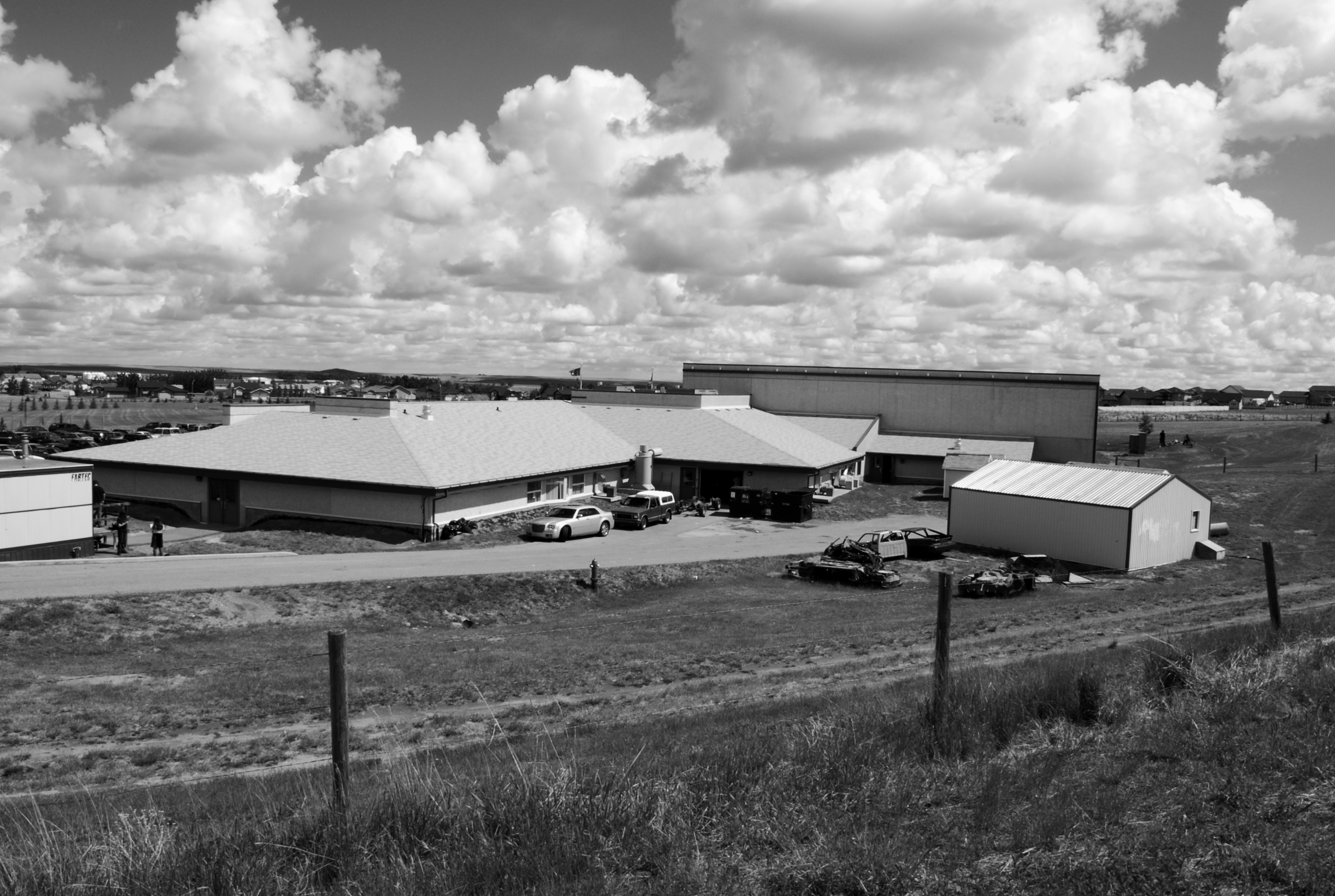

Location
- Dunmore, Canada, Alberta; 49°57′40″N 110°34′50″W

Information
- School type: Public Secondary
- Motto: "Giving Our Students Roots and Wings"
- Established: 1996
- School district: Prairie Rose Regional Division No.8
- Principal: Rocheal Howes
- Grades: 10 – 12
- Colours: Black and Teal
- Team name: Talons
- Website: eaglebutte.ca

Eagle Butte High School is a high school in Dunmore, Alberta established in 1996. It is a school with only one hallway, a single floor, and is built into a hill for better heating efficiency. It is part of Prairie Rose School Division No. 8.

== History ==
Eagle Butte High School was built in the spring of 1996. It was named after a former one-room schoolhouse in the Cypress Hills called "Eagle Butte School".

In the fall of 1996, 220 students – mostly registered in grade 10 – began study at Eagle Butte; coming from Redcliff, Irvine, Schuler, Seven Persons, Ralston and surrounding areas.

The school now offers a full range of high school programs, from welding, woodworking and firearm safety to cosmetology, food studies and computers (both Macintosh and IBM).

== Student body ==
Generally the students of Eagle Butte come from the feeder schools which are part of the Prairie Rose Regional School Division No. 8. Students come from communities or farms and ranches in or around Dunmore, Irvine, Walsh, Schuler, Elkwater, Manyberries, Medicine Hat, Suffield, Seven Persons, and Redcliff.

== Athletics ==
Eagle Butte has programs in the following sports: Badminton, Baseball, Basketball, Volleyball, Cross Country Running, Curling, Track and Field, Rugby, and a combined football team with McCoy High School in Medicine Hat.
