= Onefour, Alberta =

Onefour
- Settlement
- Location of Onefour in Alberta
- Coordinates: 49.1208°N 110.47°W
- Country: Canada
- Province: Alberta
- Region: Southern Alberta
- Census division: Division No. 1, Alberta
- County: Cypress County
- Post office: 1913
- Provincial recognition: 1947
- Time zone: UTC−7 (MST)
  - Summer (DST): UTC−6 (MDT)
- Highways: Alberta Highway 41

Onefour is a locality in Cypress County, southern Alberta, situated 16 kilometres (9.9 mi) west of Highway 41 and 104 kilometres (65 mi) southeast of Medicine Hat. It also contains Onefour Research Ranch, a former research substation of Agriculture and Agri-Food Canada and current field location of the University of Alberta.

== Toponymy ==
Onefour is named for its original geographic location in township one, range four, under the Alberta Township System. The locality later moved to township two, range four, around 9.7 kilometres (6.0 mi) away.

== Topography ==
Onefour's semi-arid terrain is characterized by hummocky moraine, extensive grasslands, and ephemeral areas of wetland. There are two igneous dikes in the area, which are uncommon in the rest of Alberta.

=== Flora and fauna ===
Native grasses in the Onefour region include needle, June, and blue grama. Sagebrush grows in flats, and prickly pear and pincushion cacti grow on hillsides. Russian thistles are also common, and rarer plants that have been identified in the area include flowering quillwort and dense boisduvalia.

The Government of Alberta maintains conservation zones in Onefour, collectively termed the Onefour Heritage Rangeland Natural Area. The area is home to Sprague's pipits, burrowing owls, ferruginous hawks, great plains toads, and western painted turtles.

Onefour is also an important habitat for pronghorn antelope and swift foxes, and hosts populations of sage-grouse, which are near-unique to southern Alberta.

== History ==
=== Pre-settlement ===
Prior to the arrival of permanent settlers, Onefour belonged to the Blackfoot Confederacy's traditional territory, as part of the modern-day Cypress County.

=== Founding and dry years: 1900–1926 ===
In the early 1900s, homesteaders began to settle in township one, range four, forming a community that subsequently identified with the name Onefour. Local rancher Theo L. Duncan (recorded in some sources as Thomas) opened a post office named Onefour on his property in 1913, as well as a general store.

The 1916 provincial census recorded a total of 163 residents in the localities of Onefour, Comrey, and Wild Horse. This was likely the district's peak population, as farmers were soon repelled from the area due to its extreme temperature changes, frequent high winds, and severe droughts (particularly during the 1930s' Dust Bowl). Finding drinking water was also complex for early settlers, who would source water from shallow wells or nearby creeks. Water obtained through the latter method would need to be strained through cloth to extract mosquito larvae and tadpoles, then boiled.

Onefour also had no access to rail or telegraph services, nor would any places of worship or community centres be founded there. The district relied on postmaster Theo Duncan to set their watches, as he was the only resident who knew how to calculate Mountain Time by reviewing the position of the sun against his ranch's longitude. In 1926, Duncan wrote of Onefour's dire conditions to Premier John Edward Brownlee:

The report of the School Board shows one family with children poorly provided with school, and three bachelors living alone, all at considerable distances from one another, and many miles from other communities... The mental state of these settlers is certain to deteriorate under this isolation... No estimate can be placed on the great value [of] human associations and relationships that have been lacking in this community for the last fifteen years. No church, no organized social activity, school struggling for existence, bachelors living alone—these do not lead to normal existence.

— Theo L. Duncan, Onefour, to Premier Brownlee, July 6, 1926.

=== Research station, abandonment, and remaining 20th century: 1927–2000 ===
In 1927, the federal government established the Onefour Dominion Experimental Farm, an agricultural research centre, to investigate best practices for dryland farming. Onefour was chosen as its location after the government assessed the community to be the driest known location in the Canadian Prairies.

Over time, the Onefour Research Ranch gradually came to overshadow the Onefour locality. It grew in size by purchasing land from homesteaders who abandoned the area after years of successive crop failures, and Onefour's population shifted from consisting of farmers to consisting primarily of research station employees. By August 1938, fewer than a "half dozen" homesteads from Onefour's earlier community remained in the area, according to the Lethbridge Herald. In December 1939, Onefour's postmaster Axel Carlson, who had succeeded Theo Duncan in September 1928, died suddenly from cardiac arrest. A bachelor with no family, he was discovered by mail courier William Trainer near his stove, with potatoes still boiling.

Despite the locality's decline, Onefour's name was approved for federal mapping purposes in 1943, and recognition by the Government of Alberta followed in March 1947. Onefour's post office relocated into the research station two years later, which by then stretched into township two. Over time, the Onefour locality shifted completely into township two. To serve workers at the station, Onefour received a store, school, and assembly hall, and contained 23 active granaries by the late 1950s, though funding cuts beginning in the 1980s reduced the number of services available. Onefour's post office closed in February 1989.

=== 21st century: 2001–present ===
In 2003, palaeontologist Wendy Sloboda found one of the largest Tyrannosaurus rex coprolites ever discovered near Onefour. It also contained a rare specimen of well-preserved dinosaur tissue.

Onefour's temperature reached 37.3 degrees Celsius in August 2020, the highest temperature recorded in the area since 1933. Its temperature reached a record low of -37.8 degrees in January 2024, the lowest since 1928.

As of 2025, Onefour remains the site of several ranches, including operations constituting the One-Four Grazing Co-op.

== Onefour Research Ranch ==
The site today known as the Onefour Research Ranch was initially known as the Dominion Range Experiment Station upon its founding in 1927. It would only assume the 'Onefour' name, derived from its neighbouring locality, in 1965. Initially, the research station was tasked with investigating problems that afflicted farmers in southern Alberta and southwestern Saskatchewan in the early 1900s, ranging from poor crop yields to grasshopper infestations. The station's early work included determining the grazing capacity of land in the area and reclaiming over-grazed farmland. By 1939, the centre covered 7,000 hectares.

Other research conducted throughout the station's time as an arm of Agriculture and Agri-Food Canada primarily concerned rangeland and cattle. In the 1950s, the station launched a Brahman and Hereford cattle cross-breeding program. After the federal government wound the program down in the late 1980s, the station's focus shifted to analyzing soil and grassland, and determining their agricultural properties. Other projects included experimenting with sheep farming and fruit trees. The station was reportedly larger than 17,000 hectares in 2002.

In 2013, Agriculture Canada decided to discontinue funding for Onefour Research Ranch, culminating in the closure of its cattle program. The Government of Alberta assumed responsibility for the now-42,000-acre ranch, allowing decades of grassland research to continue. In 2017, the province partnered with the University of Alberta to continue the ranch as a research station. Onefour Research Station remains a field location of the university's Rangeland Research Institute as of 2026.

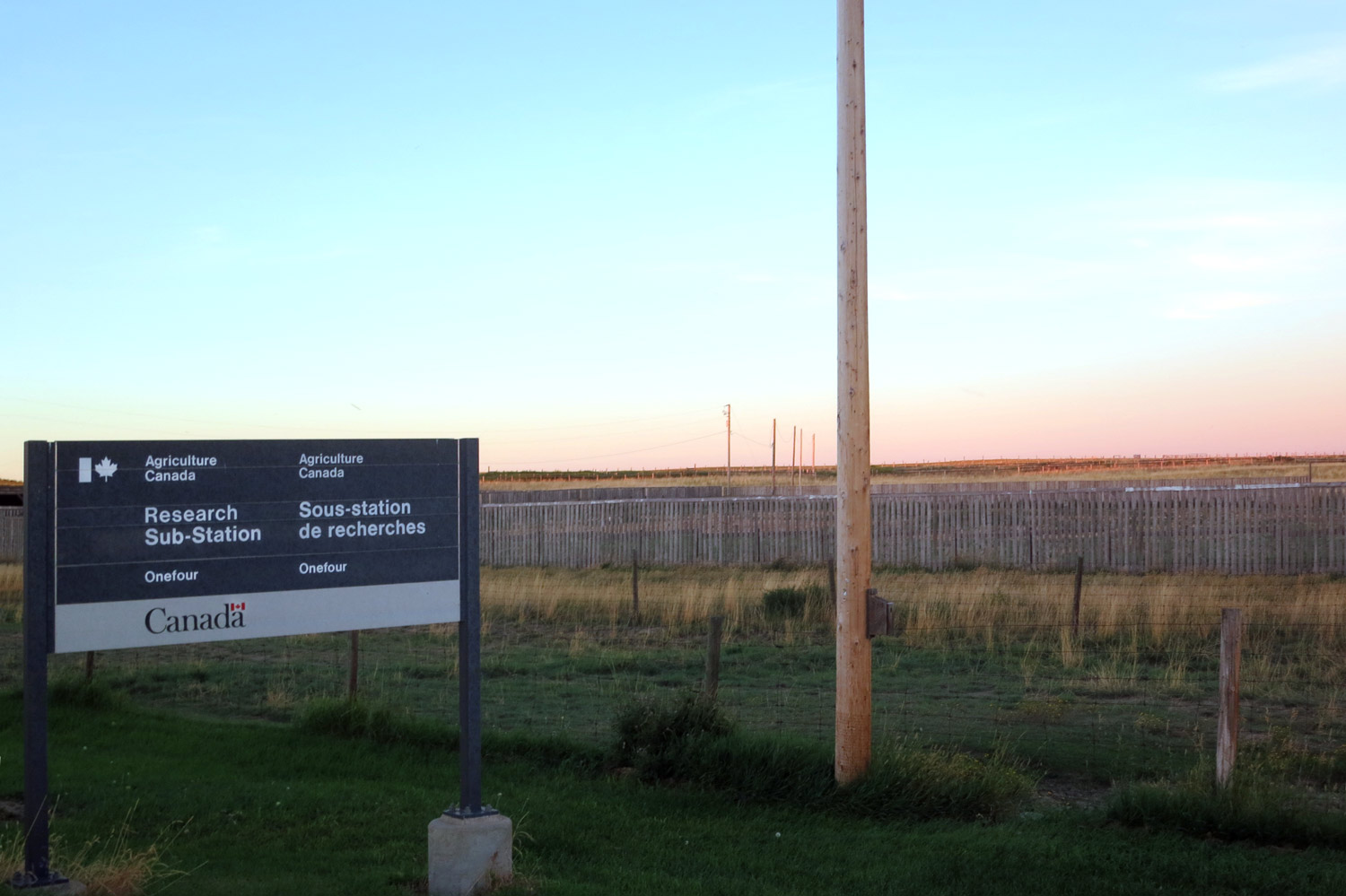

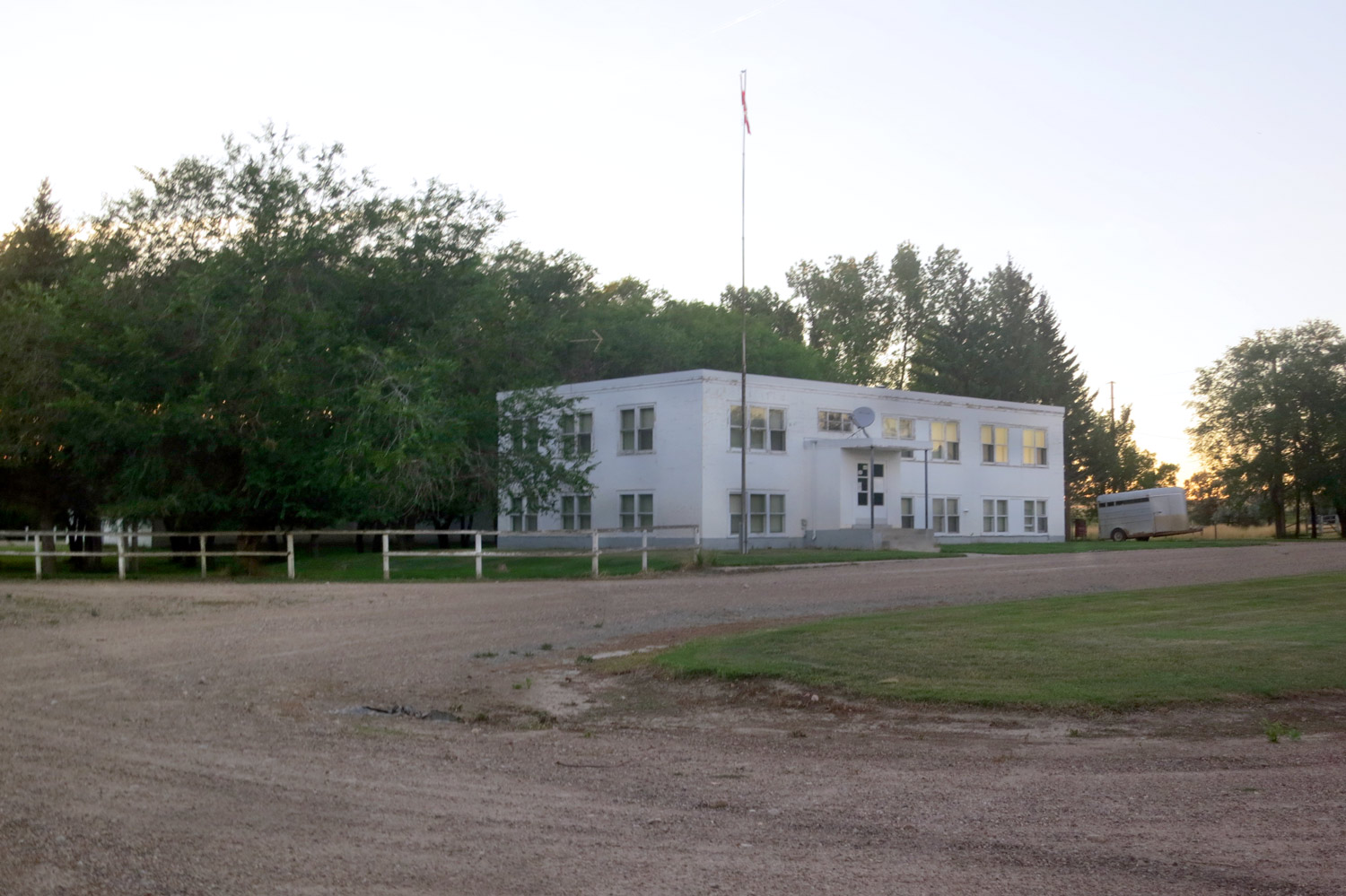
Agriculture Canada research offices in Onefour

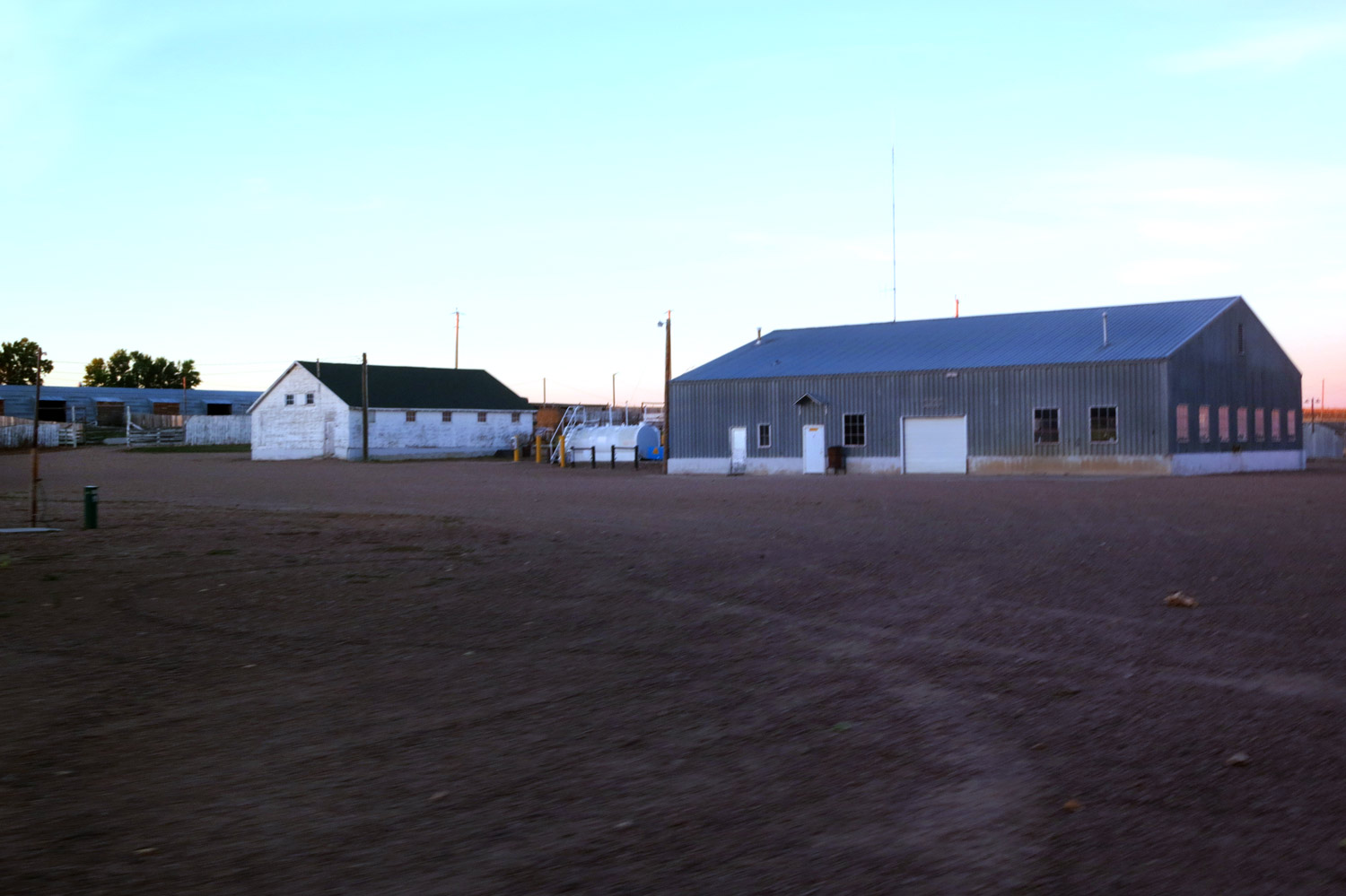
Agriculture Canada research farm outbuildings

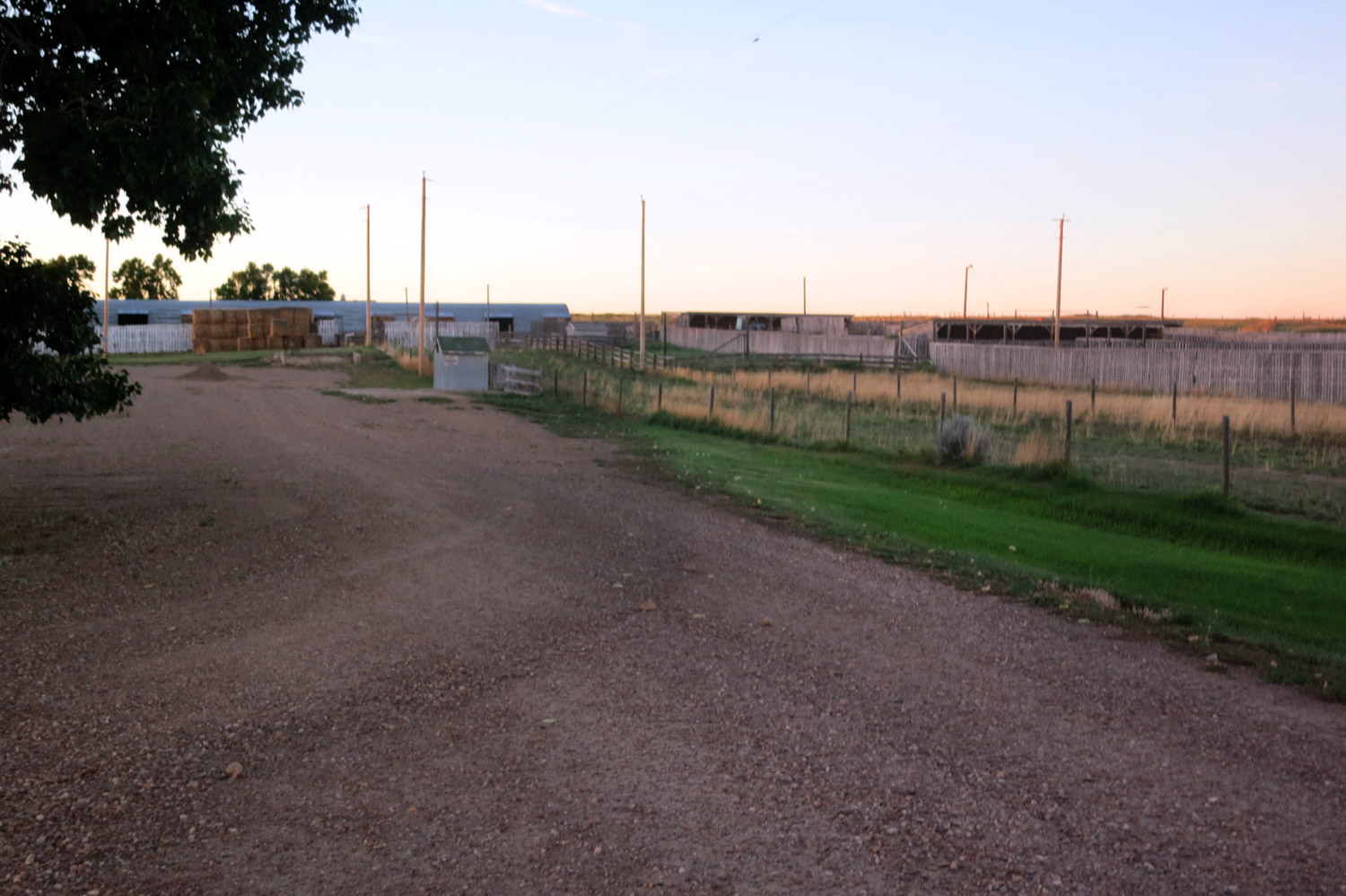
Agriculture Canada research farm stockyards and corral

== See also ==
- List of communities in Alberta
- Agriculture Canada
- Agriculture and Agri-Food Canada
- Prairie Farm Rehabilitation Administration
- Minister of State – Agriculture
