= Agatha =

Agatha may refer to:

- Agatha (film), a 1979 film about Agatha Christie
- Agatha (given name), a feminine given name, including a list of persons and fictional characters with the name
- Agatha, Alberta, a locality in Canada
- Operation Agatha, a 1946 British police and military operation in Mandatory Palestine
- Agatha (genus), a genus of gastropods
- Agatha Award, for mystery and crime writers
- Agatha of Sicily, an early Christian virgin martyr
- Agatha (wife of Edward the Exile)

== Partial titles ==
- Agatha All Along, a 2024 television miniseries based on the Marvel Comics character Agatha Harkness
- Agatha Raisin (TV series), a 2014 British TV series

== See also ==
- List of storms named Agatha, tropical storms and hurricanes
