= Alberta Highway 41 =

Highway in Alberta, Canada

Highway 41
- Buffalo Trail
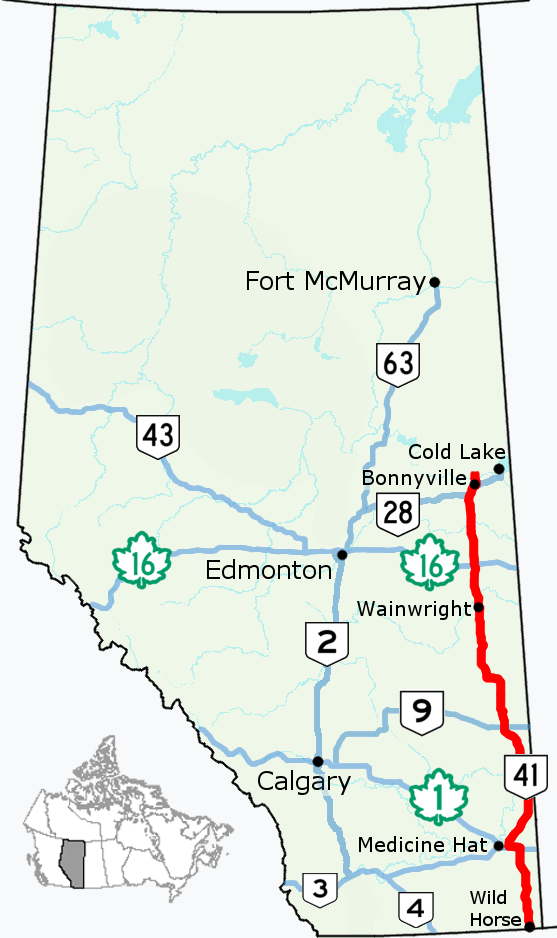
- Highway 41 highlighted in red

Route information
- Maintained by the Ministry of Transportation and Economic Corridors
- Length: 689.1 km (428.2 mi)

Major junctions
- South end: S-232 at the U.S. border in Wild Horse
- Highway 1 (TCH) near Medicine Hat; Highway 9 near Oyen; Highway 13 near Czar; Highway 14 in Wainwright; Highway 16 (TCH) in Vermilion; Highway 45 near Derwent; Highway 29 near Elk Point; Highway 28 in Bonnyville
- North end: Highway 55 in La Corey

Location
- Country: Canada
- Province: Alberta
- Specialized and rural municipalities: Cypress County, Special Area No. 2, Acadia No. 34 M.D., Special Area No. 3, Special Area No. 4, Provost No. 52 M.D., Wainwright No. 61 M.D., Vermilion River County, Two Hills No. 21 County, St. Paul No. 19 County, Bonnyville No. 87 M.D.
- Towns: Oyen, Wainwright, Vermilion, Elk Point, Bonnyville
- Villages: Consort, Czar

Highway system
- Alberta Numbered Highway Network; List; Former
← Highway 40	→ Highway 42

Highway 41, officially named Buffalo Trail, is a 686-kilometre (426 mi) north-south highway in eastern Alberta, Canada. It extends from the United States border at Wild Horse to Highway 55 in the hamlet of La Corey north of Bonnyville. Highway 41, along with Highway 36 and the portion of Highway 881 north of Lac La Biche, is part of the Eastern Alberta Trade Corridor, an economic development corridor that links the oil sands with Texas and Mexico, and works in association with the North American Ports-to-Plains Alliance.

== Route description ==
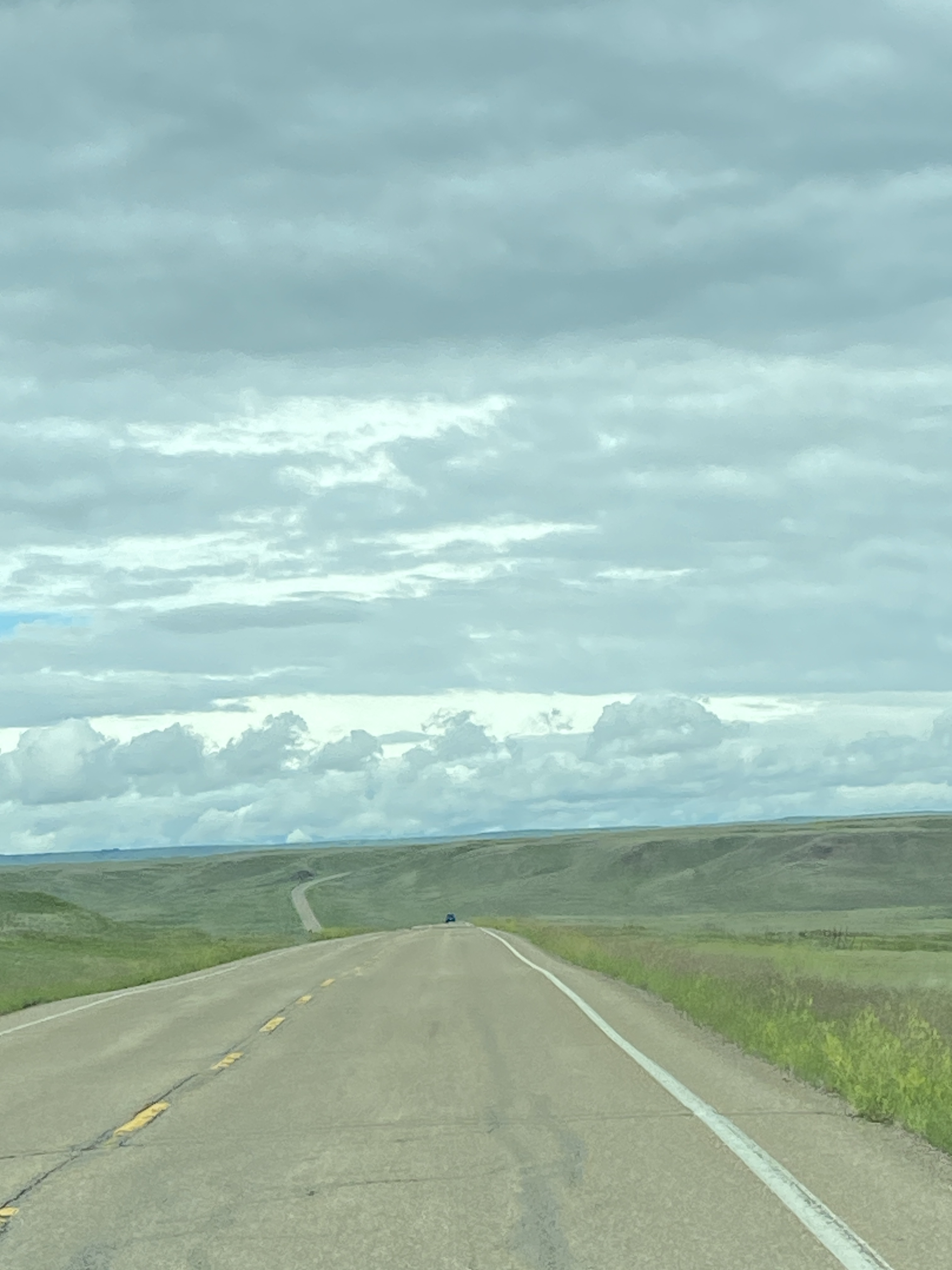
Highway 41 South south of Elkwater

Highway 41 begins at the Canada–United States border at Wild Horse as the northern continuation of Montana Secondary Highway 232, located about 69 kilometres (43 mi) north of Havre, Montana. It passes through Cypress Hills Interprovincial Park and the hamlet of Elkwater, before reaching the Trans-Canada Highway (Highway 1) about 4.5 kilometres (2.8 mi) west of Irvine. Highway 41 runs concurrent with Highway 1 for 16 kilometres (10 mi) before turning north at Dunmore, about 10 kilometres (6 mi) east of Medicine Hat. Highway 41 travels in a northeasterly direction for about 65 kilometres (40 mi) before turning due north, parallel to the Saskatchewan border which is about 6.5 kilometres (4.0 mi) further east. North of the Acadia Valley, Highway 41 travels in a northeasterly direction to Oyen, and intersects Highway 9 about 4 kilometres (2 mi) north of town. Highway 41 continues for 68 kilometres (42 mi) to Highway 12 near the Monitor, where it runs concurrent with Highway 12 for 17 kilometres (11 mi) to Consort and resumes travelling north. Highway 41 intersects Highway 13 4 kilometres (2 mi) north of Czar, before reaching Wainwright and intersecting Highway 14. Highway 41 continues for 57 kilometres (35 mi) and crosses the Yellowhead Highway (Highway 16) at Vermilion. About 7 kilometres (4 mi) east Derwent, Highway 41 shares a 4-kilometre (2 mi) concurrency with Highway 45 before reaching Elk Point. Highway 41 passes Highway 29 before reaching Highway 28 at Hoselaw, where he two routes share an 18-kilometre (11 mi) concurrency to Bonnyville. Highway 41 continues north for 20 kilometres (12 mi) and ends at Highway 55 at La Corey, about 40 kilometres (25 mi) west of Cold Lake.

== Major intersections ==
From south to north:

Rural/specialized municipality	Location	km	mi	Destinations	Notes
Cypress County	Wild Horse	0.0	0.0	S-232 south – Havre	Continuation into Montana
Cypress County	Wild Horse	0.0	0.0	Canada–United States border at Wild Horse Border Crossing	
Cypress County		26.5	16.5	Highway 501 (Red Coat Trail) – Manyberries, Eastend	
Cypress County	Cypress Hills; Interprovincial Park	79.5	49.4	PAR 115 west – Elkwater	
Cypress County	Cypress Hills; Interprovincial Park	82.4	51.2	Highway 514 west	
Cypress County		94.7	58.8	Highway 515 east – Maple Creek	
Cypress County		113.8	70.7	Highway 1 (TCH) east – Swift Current, Regina	South end of Highway 1 concurrency
Cypress County	Dunmore	129.8	80.7	Highway 1 (TCH) west – Medicine Hat	North end of Highway 1 concurrency
Cypress County		136.8	85.0	Highway 41A west – Medicine Hat	
Cypress County		168.2	104.5	Highway 528 east – Golden Prairie	
Cypress County		181.3	112.7	UAR 168 east – Schuler	
Cypress County		192.9	119.9	Highway 537 east – Fox Valley	
Cypress County		199.4	123.9	UAR 154 west – Hilda	
Cypress County		218.8	136.0	Highway 545 east – Burstall	
↑ / ↓		229.2	142.4	Crosses the South Saskatchewan River	
Special Area No. 2		245.5	152.5	Highway 555 west – Bindloss, Jenner	
Special Area No. 2		250.4	155.6	UAR 139 north – Empress	
↑ / ↓		254.3	158.0	Crosses the Red Deer River	
M.D. of Acadia No. 34		260.4	161.8	Highway 562 east – Empress	
M.D. of Acadia No. 34		280.8	174.5	UAR 178 east – Acadia Valley	
↑ / ↓		290.9	180.8	Highway 570 – Big Stone	
Special Area No. 3	Oyen	312.3	194.1	Highway 895 south	
Special Area No. 3		315.6	196.1	Highway 9 – Drumheller, Kindersley	
Special Area No. 4	Monitor	383.9	238.5	Highway 12 east – Kerrobert	South end of Highway 12 concurrency
Special Area No. 4	Consort	401.2	249.3	Highway 12 west – Stettler Highway 886 south – Cereal	North end of Highway 12 concurrency
Special Area No. 4		413.7	257.1	PAR 121 east – Gooseberry Lake Provincial Park	
↑ / ↓		429.3	266.8	Highway 599 west – Castor	
M.D. of Provost No. 52		439.2	272.9	Highway 600 east – Cadogan, Provost	
M.D. of Provost No. 52	Czar	455.6	283.1	UAR 121 west	
M.D. of Provost No. 52		459.8	285.7	Highway 13 – Camrose, Provost	
M.D. of Wainwright No. 61	No major junctions				
Wainwright		499.3	310.3	Highway 14 (Poundmaker Trail) – Edmonton, The Battlefords	
M.D. of Wainwright No. 61		512.3	318.3	Highway 614 east	
M.D. of Wainwright No. 61		517.1	321.3	Crosses the Battle River	
M.D. of Wainwright No. 61		517.9	321.8	Highway 883 west – Irma	
County of Vermilion River		536.2	333.2	Highway 619 – Lloydminster, Viking	
County of Vermilion River	Vermilion	556.4	345.7	Highway 16 (TCH/YH) – Edmonton, Lloydminster	Interchange; Highway 16 exit 577
County of Vermilion River		579.1	359.8	Highway 631 west	
County of Two Hills No. 21		585.6	363.9	Highway 45 east – Marwayne	South end of Highway 45 concurrency
County of Two Hills No. 21		592.1	367.9	Highway 45 west – Derwent, Two Hills	North end of Highway 45 concurrency
County of Two Hills No. 21		602.1	374.1	Highway 640 east – Heinsburg	
County of St. Paul No. 19		615.2	382.3	Crosses the North Saskatchewan River	
County of St. Paul No. 19	Elk Point	618.3	384.2	Highway 646 – Lafond, Lindbergh	
County of St. Paul No. 19		627.6– 628.3	390.0– 390.4	Highway 29 west – St. Paul	Y intersection; former Highway 28 west
Kehewin No. 123		644.1	400.2	Highway 657 east – Gurneyville	
M.D. of Bonnyville No. 87	Hoselaw	652.0	405.1	Highway 28 west – Smoky Lake, Edmonton	South end of Highway 28 concurrency; former Highway 28A west
M.D. of Bonnyville No. 87		662.3	411.5	UAR 96 west – Bonnyville Beach	
Bonnyville		669.6	416.1	50 Avenue (Highway 28 east) / 55 Street – Cold Lake	North end of Highway 28 concurrency
M.D. of Bonnyville No. 87		672.8	418.1	Highway 660 – Fort Kent, Glendon	
M.D. of Bonnyville No. 87	La Corey	689.1	428.2	Highway 55 (NWRR) – Lac La Biche, Cold Lake	
1.000 mi = 1.609 km; 1.000 km = 0.621 mi: Concurrency terminus; Route transition

== Highway 41A ==
Highway 41A
- Location: Cypress County, Medicine Hat
- Length: 15.0 km (9.3 mi)

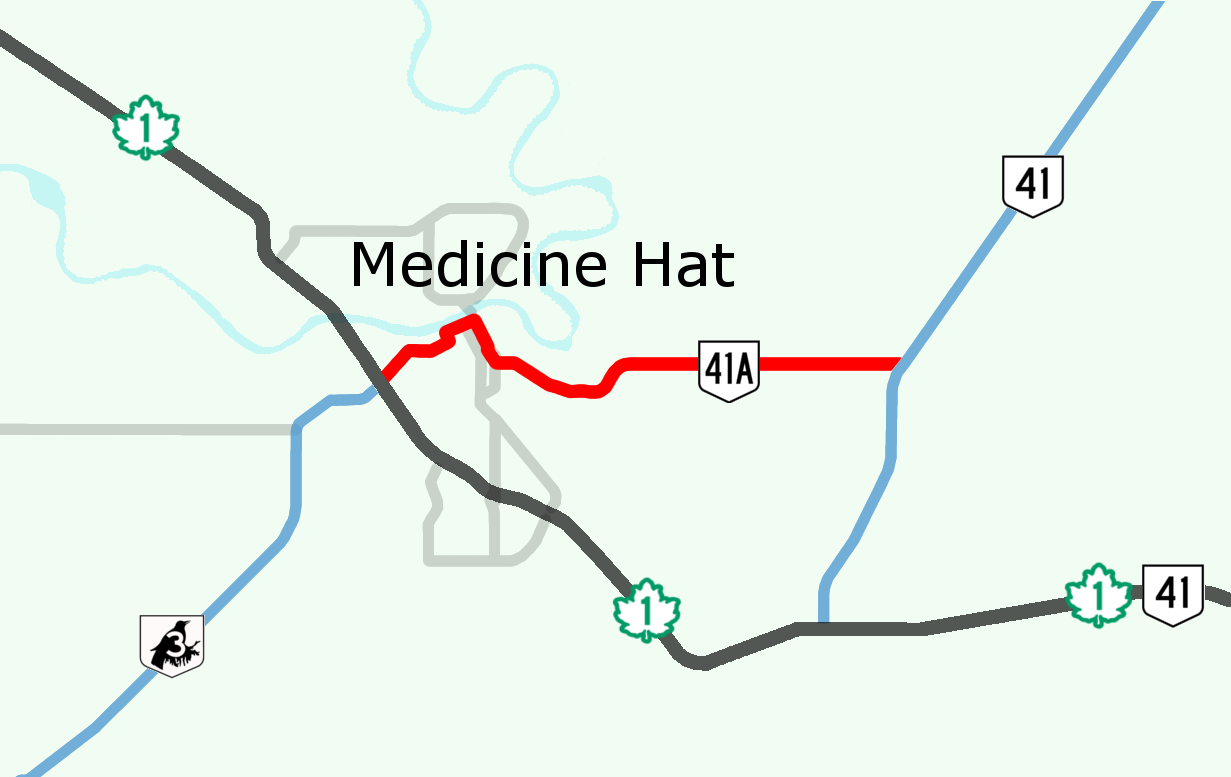
Highway 41A in Medicine Hat, Alberta

Alberta Provincial Highway No. 41A is the designation of an alternate route off Highway 41 serving the city of Medicine Hat. It branches off Highway 41 approximately 7 km (4.3 mi) north of the Trans-Canada Highway and runs approximately 12 km (7.5 mi). It winds through Medicine Hat and terminates at its junction with the Trans-Canada Highway and the Crowsnest Highway (Highway 3) west of the downtown core.

=== Major intersections ===
Starting from the east end of Highway 41A.

Location	km	mi	Destinations	Notes
Cypress County	0.0	0.0	Highway 41 – Oyen, Hwy 1 (TCH), Havre	50°01′48″N 110°32′01″W
Medicine Hat	10.0	6.2	Bridge Street SE	Hwy 41A branches west 50°02′00″N 110°39′24″W
Medicine Hat	10.6	6.6	North Railway Street SE	Hwy 41A turns northwest 50°02′01″N 110°39′52″W
Medicine Hat	11.0	6.8	Prince Street SE	Hwy 41A branches northeast 50°02′12″N 110°40′03″W
Medicine Hat	11.1	6.9	Maple Avenue SE to Highway 1 (TCH)	Hwy 41A branches northwest 50°02′14″N 110°39′59″W
Medicine Hat	11.9	7.4	1 Street SE	Hwy 41A branches southwest 50°02′36″N 110°40′19″W
Medicine Hat	12.1	7.5	North Railway Street SE	Northeast-bound right-in/right-out 50°02′33″N 110°40′26″W
Medicine Hat	12.2	7.6	South Railway Street SE to Highway 1 (TCH)	Northeast-bound right-in/right-out 50°02′32″N 110°40′30″W
Medicine Hat	12.3	7.6	6 Avenue SE	50°02′29″N 110°40′37″W
Medicine Hat	12.6	7.8	4 Avenue SE	Hwy 41A branches southeast 50°02′24″N 110°40′53″W
Medicine Hat	12.9	8.0	3 Street SE	Hwy 41A branches southwest 50°02′18″N 110°40′48″W
Medicine Hat	13.4	8.3	Division Avenue S	Hwy 41A turns west; becomes 3 Street SW; 50°02′10″N 110°41′13″W
Medicine Hat	14.0	8.7	Gershaw Drive SW	Hwy 41A turns southwest 50°02′10″N 110°41′39″W
Medicine Hat	15.0	9.3	Highway 1 (TCH) – Swift Current, Calgary Highway 3 (Crowsnest Highway) – Airport	50°01′45″N 110°42′11.8″W
1.000 mi = 1.609 km; 1.000 km = 0.621 mi: Incomplete access
