= Veinerville =

- Hamlet
- Location of Veinerville Veinerville (Canada)
- Coordinates: 50°2′5″N 110°37′40″W
- Country: Canada
- Province: Alberta
- Region: Southern Alberta
- Census division: 1
- Municipal district: Cypress County

Government
  - Type: Unincorporated
  - Governing body: Cypress County Council

Area (2021)
  - Land: 0.18 km^{2} (0.069 sq mi)

Population (2021)
  - Total: 70
  - Density: 399.3/km^{2} (1,034/sq mi)
- Time zone: UTC−06:00 (Alberta Time)
- Area codes: 403, 587, 825

Veinerville is a hamlet in southern Alberta, Canada within Cypress County. It is located 0.5 kilometres (0.31 mi) northwest of Highway 41A, and less than 150 metres (490 ft) from Medicine Hat's east boundary.

== History ==
The town was named after Mayor Henry Viener of Medicine Hat.

In the 1960s, a Medicine Hat Transportation Company bus route was slated to be enstated to the town, however there was little interest from residents. Later, a stop was made on the Flats route that was approximately 200 metres downhill from the town.

== Demographics ==
In the 2021 Census of Population conducted by Statistics Canada, Veinerville had a population of 70 living in 32 of its 35 total private dwellings, a change of −15.7% from its 2016 population of 83. With a land area of 0.18 km^{2} (0.069 sq mi), it had a population density of 388.9/km^{2} (1,007.2/sq mi) in 2021.

As a designated place in the 2016 Census of Population conducted by Statistics Canada, Veinerville had a population of 83 living in 35 of its 35 total private dwellings, a change of 6.4% from its 2011 population of 78. With a land area of 0.11 km^{2} (0.042 sq mi), it had a population density of 754.5/km^{2} (1,954.3/sq mi) in 2016.

== See also ==
- List of communities in Alberta
- List of hamlets in Alberta
