= EBHS =

EBHS may refer to:

- Eagle Butte High School, Dunmore, Alberta, Canada
- East Bakersfield High School, Bakersfield, California, United States
- East Bernard High School, East Bernard, Texas, United States
- East Brunswick High School, East Brunswick Township, New Jersey, United States
- Epping Boys High School, Epping, New South Wales, Australia
