= Alderson, Alberta =

Alderson Carlstadt (1911–1916)
- Locality
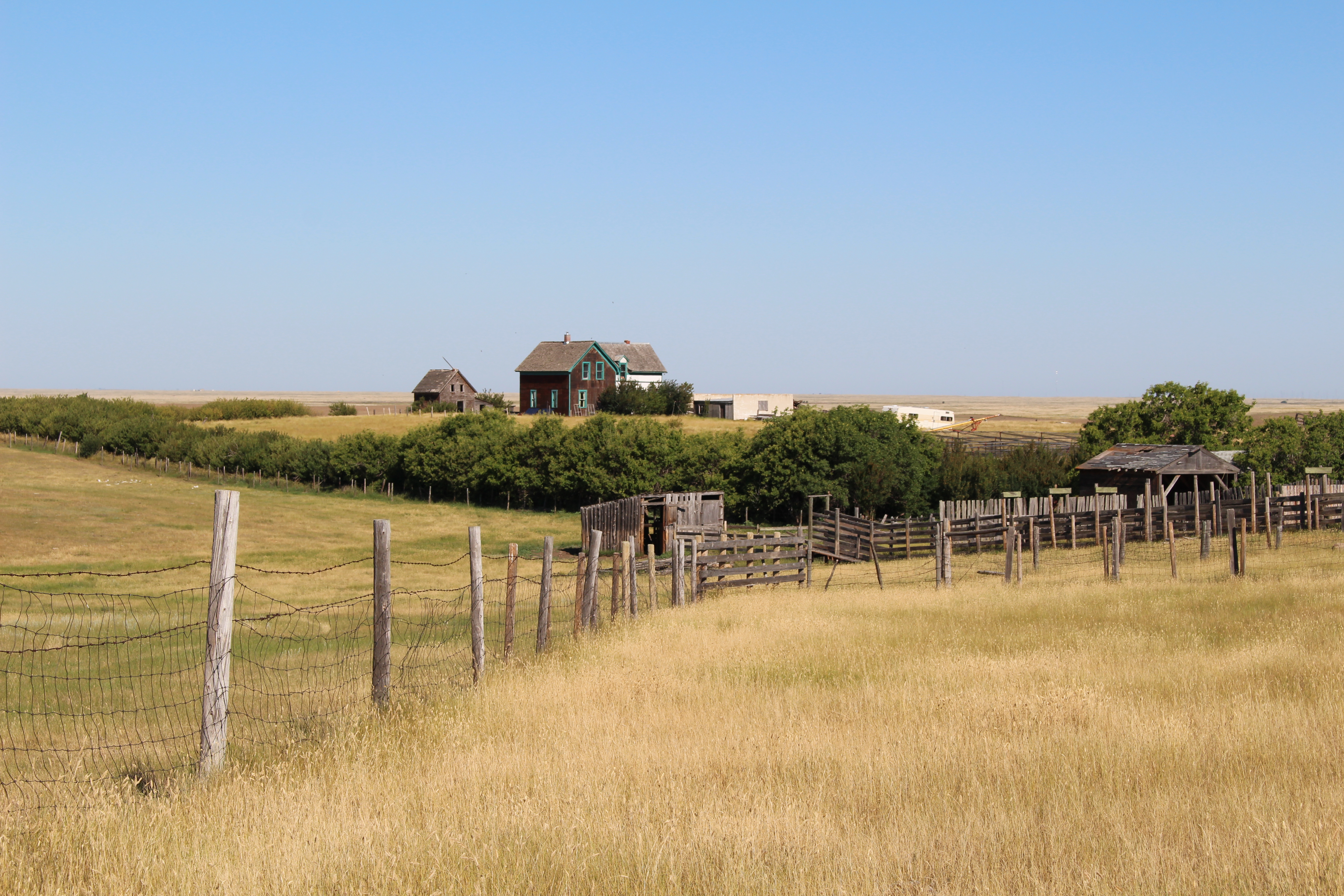
- Motto: "Star of the Prairies"
- Location of Alderson in Alberta
- Coordinates: 50.281°N 111.347°W
- Country: Canada
- Province: Alberta
- Region: Southeast Alberta
- Census division: 1
- Municipal district: Cypress County
- Founded: 1909

Government
  - Governing body: Cypress County Council
- Elevation: 760 m (2,490 ft)
- Time zone: UTC−06:00 (Alberta Time)
- Railways: Canadian Pacific Railway

Alderson was a village in Alberta, Canada, within Cypress County. Now a ghost town, its abandoned site lies approximately 20 km (12 mi) southwest of Suffield and 53 km (33 mi) northwest of Medicine Hat, along the Canadian Pacific Railway's main line.

== Toponymy ==
Alderson was named after Lieutenant-General Sir Edwin Alfred Hervey Alderson, who commanded the First Canadian Division in Europe during the First World War.

== Topography ==
The Alderson site's landscape consists of rolling hills that are hummocky in places. Soils are primarily chernozemic and solonetzic, characteristic of Alderson's location within Palliser's Triangle. Identified as unsuitable for farming by explorer John Palliser in the late 1850s, the triangle is typified by desert-like conditions, short grasses, and shallow topsoil that is poor for agriculture.

== History ==
=== Langevin and Carlstadt: 1883–1914 ===
Alderson was founded as a permanent settlement in 1883, when the Canadian Pacific Railway (CPR) built a station there. The station, and the community that developed around it, was originally named Langevin, after Hector-Louis Langevin.

In 1908, local farmer Wemyss Cotter complained to the CPR that 'Langevin' sounded too similar to other settlements in Alberta, such as Langdon. He feared that he would not receive letters from his new wife, Charlotte Cotter (née Mason), who had not yet joined him in the prairies.

The CPR acquiesced in 1909 and renamed the station with the German-inspired identifier of Carlstadt, in recognition of the area's growing German population. Wemyss Cotter opened a post office with the name of Carlstadt in August that year, and the provincial government recognized Carlstadt as a village in 1910.

Speculators had high hopes for Carlstadt's economic potential, nicknaming it the "Star of the Prairie". A school opened to serve the community in 1910, and a local newspaper, the Carlstadt Progress (later the Carlstadt News), began publishing in 1911. Editor Calvin Goss wrote of his community in 1912: "Three years ago Bassano was nothing [and] two years ago Brooks was nothing; but look at them today. This year is Carlstadt's."

At its peak, the locality boasted five hotels and four grain elevators, in anticipation of steady growth. Commercial operations included a livery and a branch of the Union Bank of Canada. Nonetheless, the first signs of the settlement's eventual decline occurred in 1914. That year saw a prairie fire claim several commercial buildings, which were not rebuilt. There was also so little rain that farmers hired rainmakers, or charlatans who falsely claimed that they could influence the weather.

=== Alderson: 1915–1936 ===
After Canada entered the First World War against Germany, Carlstadt residents decided to once again rename their village, to shed its German connotations. They held a contest that was ultimately won by Charlotte Cotter, wife of postmaster Wemyss, who suggested Alderson in honour of a British military commander. The post office's name changed to Alderson in June 1915, as did its newspaper, and the Carlstadt Hotel became the Alberta Hotel.

The Government of Alberta officially recognized Alderson's new name on March 24, 1916. At this time, the village had between 200 and 300 residents, which would prove to be its peak. Despite the optimism of its early settlers, Alderson's farms would face particularly relentless dry weather throughout the rest of the decade. When the federal government introduced conscription for the war effort in 1917, Alderson farmers staged a protest, stating that they could not afford to release their sons as their farms were already struggling to produce crops.

Between 1917 and 1919, Alderson's grain elevators went from shipping 72,000 bushels annually to just 9,000. The Alderson News published its last issue on July 25, 1918, just three years after its name changed from Carlstadt. Village treasurer George Steele wrote to the Deputy Minister of Municipal Affairs on January 22, 1919: "Owing to poor crop conditions the last two years, the village has become considerably depopulated... [It] seems to me as though some [lot owners] would like to repudiate their ownership. In many cases we do not know who the owners are and I don't know how to find out."

Fire at Alderson, August 23, 1919.

Alderson also continued to experience frequent fires, exacerbated by dry weather. In August 1919, six stores and the disused office of the Alderson News were lost to a fire, caused by an overheated stove inside a hotel. The hotel itself was also destroyed, with losses of $75,000 estimated by the Medicine Hat News ($1,256,633 in constant dollars).

In 1921, Alderson's farms were blighted by a grasshopper infestation that spread from Manitoba. The following year, the Government of Alberta reported that 450,000 acres of a total 784,000 in the Alderson region were in the process of foreclosure. The Alberta Hotel, once an anchor business for Alderson, relocated to Gleichen in 1924, and unrecoverable debts forced the local Union Bank branch to close soon after. Most of Alderson's farms were abandoned by 1925, with owners collectively owing $14,000 in unpaid taxes ($252,615 in constant dollars). Alderson School was also delinquent on its property taxes by 1927.

The few farms that remained operational in Alderson enjoyed improved crop yields in 1927 and 1928. The latter also saw Alderson receive a visit from Edward VIII, then-Prince of Wales. Nonetheless, Alderson's profitable years were followed by a decade of drought that effectively ended the community. Alderson was largely abandoned by the mid-1930s, and the village was officially dissolved on January 31, 1936, at the request of its municipal government.

=== Abandonment: 1937–present ===
Alderson siding on the Canadian Pacific Railway main line, photographed in 2014.

Passenger rail services to Alderson ended in 1938. According to resident Carl Anderson, who had farmed continuously in the area since 1910, the rest of the area's original settlers had died or left Alderson by 1940. Alderson's post office continued operating until September 1951, having been managed by a succession of several acting postmasters since June 1948.

By 1970, all that remained of Alderson were three abandoned buildings: a general store, the CPR section house, and a livery. The general store was burned down by arsonists in the late 1970s, and a prairie fire burned down the section house and livery in 2014.

As of 2026, it is possible to see some cement foundations from Alderson's buildings, including that of Alderson School.

== Landmarks ==
=== Alderson Cemetery ===
Around 1912, resident Tom Swanby donated two acres of land for use as a graveyard, which would become Carlstadt Cemetery (also referred to as Alderson Cemetery). Though abandoned, the cemetery can be seen a mile south of the railway track. It is maintained by volunteers on occasion.

=== Langevin Discovery Wells ===
The original Alderson site is marked by a cairn that commemorates two natural gas wells in the area: 'C.P.R. No. 1,' discovered in 1883, and 'No. 2. Langevin,' discovered in 1884. The first was struck in December 1883 by a drilling crew the CPR had hired to install a water well. The CPR's efforts to develop 'C.P.R. No. 1' ended in January 1884, when an explosion at the site seriously injured two contractors; the well was soon sealed. Workers discovered a second well, dubbed 'No. 2. Langevin', later that year, which became the first well drilled in Alberta for the purpose of extracting natural gas as fuel.

By October 1884, the CPR had installed a gas line from No. 2. Langevin to fuel its section house. Although the CPR encouraged settlers to take advantage of the fuel source, most opted to establish their farms closer to Langevin's water source instead. The locality of Langevin, now Alderson, was abandoned by the mid-1930s, and the CPR sealed off No. 2. Langevin around 1935 after a gas explosion. Because No. 2. Langevin had been poorly sealed, Alberta's Energy Resources Conservation Board ordered the CPR to reseal the well in 1954.

In 1978, PanCanadian Petroleum decided to investigate the two abandoned wells that had marked the start of Alberta's natural gas industry. By this time, it was unknown whether C.P.R. No. 1 had indeed been a separate well from No. 2. Langevin. A dig the following year located both wells, which were collectively declared to be a provincial historic site by Minister Mary LeMessurier in 1981. PanCanadian Petroleum funded the installation of a cairn at the site, to celebrate the CPR's centennial.

== Demographics ==
Population history of Alderson
Year	Pop.	±%
1901		—
1906		—
1911	162	—
1916		—
1921	111	—
1926		—
1931	81	—
Source: Statistics Canada

In the 1931 Census, Alderson had a population of 81.

== Historic interest ==
What remains of Alderson, and its status as a ghost town, has attracted occasional interest from local journalists and urban explorers. In 2018, writer Johnnie Bachusky described why interest in Alderson persisted into the 21st century: "That place was supposed to be opening the new frontier of Alberta... [a] big city offering all kinds of hopes and dreams and prosperity".

University of Calgary academic David C. Jones has written several books charting Alderson's rise and decline, of which the most notable is Empire of Dust: Settling and Abandoning the Prairie Dry Belt (1987).

== Notable people ==
- John J. Bowlen (1876–1959) – the seventh Lieutenant Governor of Alberta; owned a ranch near Alderson in the 1930s

== See also ==
- List of communities in Alberta
- List of former urban municipalities in Alberta
- List of ghost towns in Alberta
