= Jenner School =

Jenner School or Jenner Elementary School may refer to:

- Edward Jenner School (later Jenner Academy of the Arts) in Chicago
- Jenner School, Prairie Rose School Division 8, Jenner, Alberta
