= Eagle Butte (Nevada) =

Mountain in Nevada, United States

- Location within Nevada

Highest point
- Elevation: 8,405 ft (2,562 m) NAVD 88
- Prominence: 711 ft (217 m)
- Coordinates: 39°31′48″N 116°48′32″W

Geography
- Location: Lander County, Nevada
- Parent range: Simpson Park Mountains
- Topo map: USGS Bates Mountain

Eagle Butte is a Nevada peak east of Simpson Park.
