= Postal orders of Canada =

Postal orders were a service provided by the Canadian Post Office, and was a method of transferring funds between 1898 and 1 April 1949.

Postal orders have been issued by the Canadian Post Office roughly since confederation (the timeline linked to below, for example, cites the postal money order system as expanding to Manitoba in July 1873). Money orders were issue for values up to $100, while postal notes (introduced 4 August 1898) were for sending small sums between 10¢ and $5.

Canadian postal orders and notes were not issued in Newfoundland, as Newfoundland was an independent dominion, and a British colony, before it became a Canadian province, although Canadian postal notes were allowed to be paid in Newfoundland.

== Range of denominations ==
Here is a list of denominations of the Canadian postal notes as noted on P.N.107-12,000, which was issued by the Post Office Department, Ottawa with effect from 13 December 1934. They are listed as pairs of values and commissions, including revenue tax:

10¢ (1¢), 20¢ (2¢), 25¢ (2¢), 30¢ (2¢), 40¢ (2¢), 50¢ (3¢), 60¢ (3¢), 70¢ (3¢), 75¢ (3¢), 80¢ (3¢), 90¢ (3¢), $1 (3¢), $1.50 (5¢), $2 (6¢), $2.50 (6¢), $3 (6¢), $4 (6¢), $5 (6¢), $10 (8¢).

The $10 postal notes were issued at non-accounting offices.

== Postal Note Stamps ==
Canada was the only British Commonwealth country to issue special postal note stamps. These were used for the purpose of extending the value of a postal note up to a value of 99c. above the denomination of the postal note itself. The United States had issued postal note stamps as well.

== British Forces Post Office-issued British Postal Orders ==
These have been issued only in Alberta and Newfoundland. There is also a British Forces Post Office in Ottawa - B.F.P.O. 487.

B.F.P.O. issues from B.F.P.O. 14, Suffield, Alberta have been confirmed.

== British overprinted postal orders ==
A series of British postal orders were overprinted in about 1905 as examples of what Canadian-issued British postal orders might look like. However, plans to issue British postal orders throughout Canada never materialised. In July 2006, a set of 3 British postal orders overprinted "Canada" and the word "Specimen" turned up and were sold on eBay for £7,123. These are believed to be unique.

The denominations with their details are as follows;

2/6 (61 Cents). Serial number 21/C J29313.

4/- (97 Cents). Serial number E/14 537597.

12/6 ($3.04). Serial number 2/N 900005.

These postal orders can be found illustrated on http://www.gbos.org.uk/index.php/Overprint_Postal_Orders
