= Reesor Lake (Alberta) =

Lake in Alberta, Canada

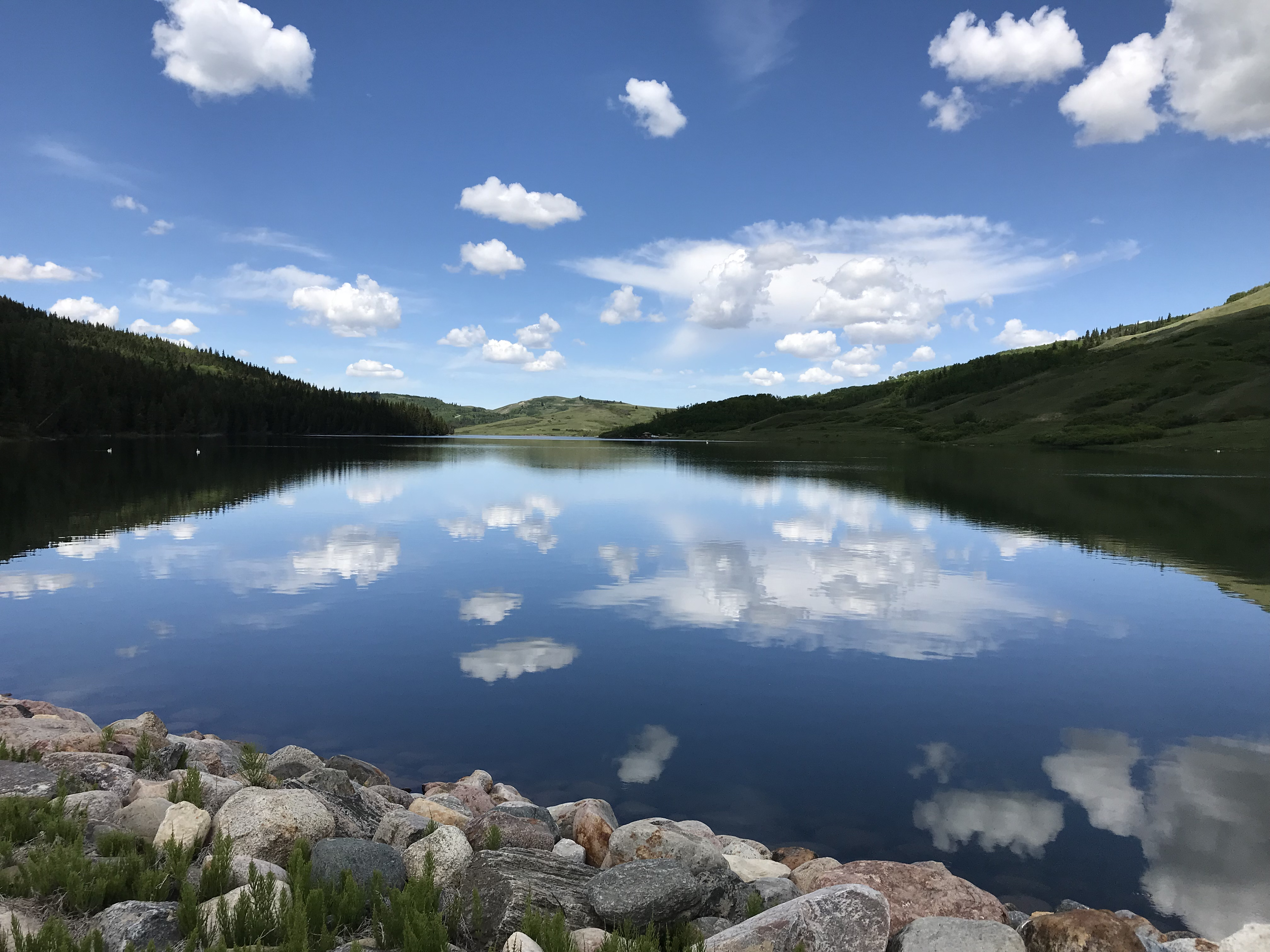
- Reesor Lake in July 2020

- Location within Alberta
- Location: Cypress County, Alberta
- Coordinates: 49°39′55″N 110°06′27″W
- Basin countries: Canada
- Max. length: 1.4 km (0.87 mi)
- Max. width: 1.9 km (1.2 mi)
- Surface area: 51 ha (130 acres)
- Average depth: 3.7 m (12 ft)
- Max. depth: 5.5 m (18 ft)
- Surface elevation: 1,239 m (4,065 ft)
- References: Reesor Lake

Reesor Lake is a lake in Cypress Hills Provincial Park, in Alberta. Reesor Lake is a small, popular trout-fishing reservoir located within Cypress Hills Provincial Park in the Municipal District of Cypress. It was named after David William Reesor, the son of Senator David Reesor, who settled in the area in 1900. The original Reesor ranch house still stands near the shore (Alta. Cult. Multicult. n.d.). Prior to 1960, the lake was two small, separate water bodies, called Twin Lakes. In 1960, a dam was constructed across the southeast end of the valley where the two lakes were located. Water was diverted into the reservoir from Battle Creek, raising the water level and thus creating a single lake.

Cypress Hills Provincial Park is situated approximately 65 km southeast of Medicine Hat, off Highway 41. Of the 12 campgrounds in the park, two are located near Reesor Lake. The first of these is Reesor Lake Dock Campground, which is situated on the north shore of the lake off the Reesor Lake Road. It is open year-round and has 24 random campsites, a water pump, a fishing pier and a boat launch. The second campground, Reesor Lake Campground, is located south of the lake on the south side of Battle Creek. It is open from May to September and provides 40 campsites, including 7 walk-in tenting sites, tap water, picnic tables, a picnic shelter, a playground and weekly interpretive programs. A boat launch is located at the western end of the dam. The only boat motors allowed on the lake are electric (Alta. For. Ld. Wild. 1988).
