= Desert Blume =

- Hamlet
- Location of Desert Blume Desert Blume (Canada)
- Coordinates: 49°59′13″N 110°43′25″W
- Country: Canada
- Province: Alberta
- Region: Southern Alberta
- Census division: 1
- Municipal district: Cypress County

Government
  - Type: Unincorporated
  - Governing body: Cypress County Council

Area (2021)
  - Land: 1.43 km^{2} (0.55 sq mi)

Population (2021)
  - Total: 835
  - Density: 583.8/km^{2} (1,512/sq mi)
- Time zone: UTC−06:00 (Alberta Time)
- Area codes: 403, 587, 825

Desert Blume is a hamlet in southern Alberta, Canada within Cypress County, adjacent to the southern boundary of Medicine Hat.

The hamlet is located on southwest corner of South Boundary Road (Township Road 122) and Range Road 61A, 0.8 kilometres (0.50 mi) southeast of Highway 3.

== Demographics ==
Population history of Desert Blume
Year	Pop.	±%
2011	306	—
2016	586	+91.5%
2016R	574	−2.0%
2021	835	+45.5%
Source: Statistics Canada

In the 2021 Census of Population conducted by Statistics Canada, Desert Blume had a population of 835 living in 279 of its 284 total private dwellings, a change of 45.5% from its 2016 population of 574. With a land area of 1.43 km^{2} (0.55 sq mi), it had a population density of 583.9/km^{2} (1,512.3/sq mi) in 2021.

Cypress County indicates that the population of the Hamlet of Desert Blume was 586 in the 2016 Census, a change of 91.5% from its 2011 population of 306.

== See also ==
- List of communities in Alberta
- List of hamlets in Alberta
