= Czar, Alberta =

Czar
- Village
- Village of Czar
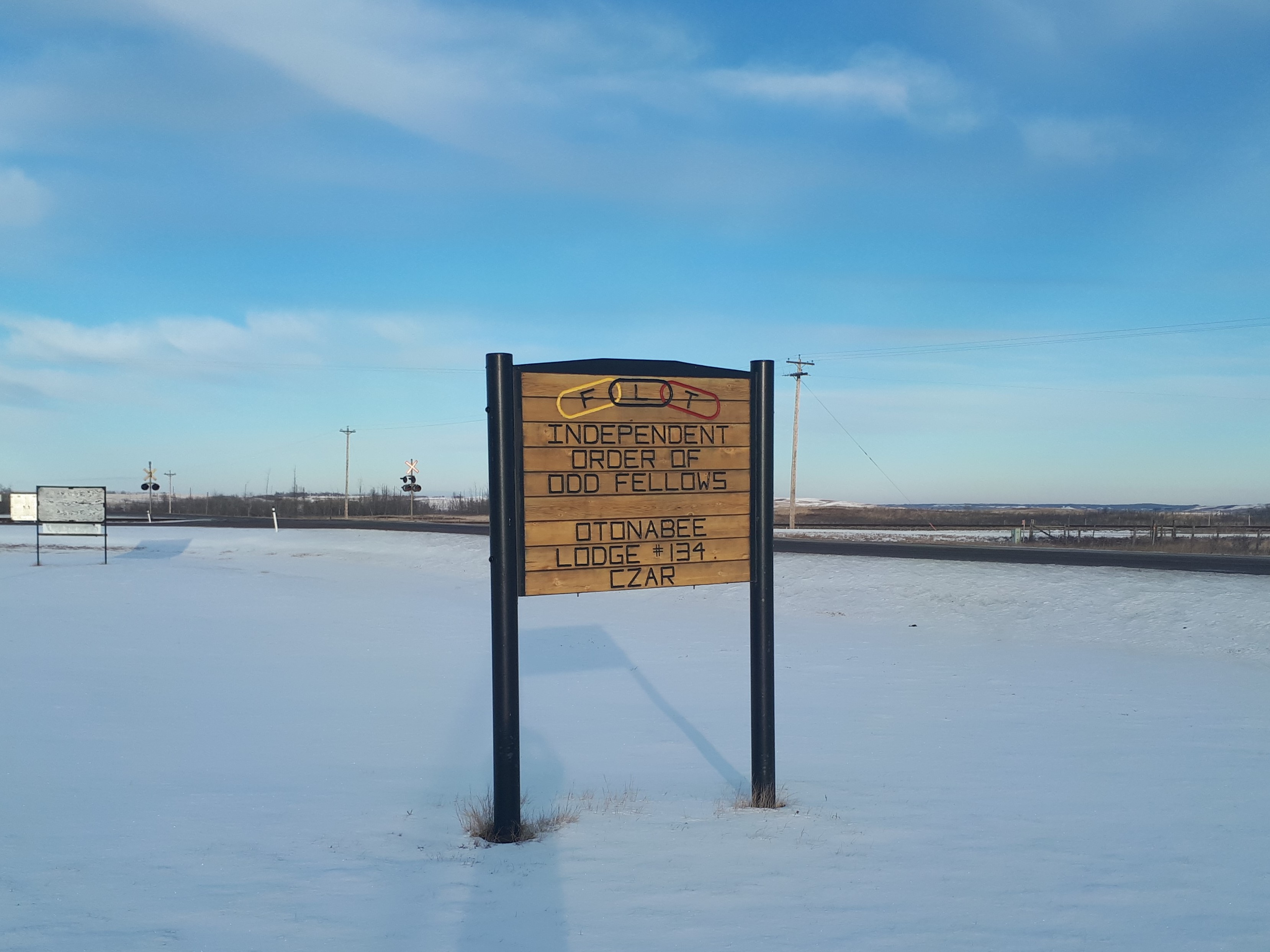
- Czar, Alberta
- Motto: Where the Cowboys Reign
- Location in Alberta
- Coordinates: 52°27′15.2″N 110°49′47.7″W
- Country: Canada
- Province: Alberta
- Region: Central Alberta
- Census division: 7
- Municipal district: Municipal District of Provost No. 52
- Incorporated
  - Village: November 12, 1917

Government
  - Mayor: Angela Large
  - Governing body: Czar Village Council

Area (2021)
  - Land: 1.12 km^{2} (0.43 sq mi)
- Elevation: 685 m (2,247 ft)

Population (2021)
  - Total: 248
  - Density: 221.2/km^{2} (573/sq mi)
- Time zone: UTC−06:00 (Alberta Time)
- Area code: 780 587
- Highways: Highway 41; Highway 13
- Waterway: Shorncliffe Lake
- Website: www.villageofczar.ca

Czar is a village in central Alberta, Canada. It is 70 kilometres (43 mi) west of the Saskatchewan border, at the intersection of Highway 13, Buffalo Trail, and the Canadian Pacific Kansas City tracks.

== Demographics ==
In the 2021 Census of Population conducted by Statistics Canada, the Village of Czar had a population of 248 living in 86 of its 99 total private dwellings, a change of 22.8% from its 2016 population of 202. With a land area of 1.12 km^{2} (0.43 sq mi), it had a population density of 221.4/km^{2} (573.5/sq mi) in 2021.

In the 2016 Census of Population conducted by Statistics Canada, the Village of Czar recorded a population of 202 living in 85 of its 87 total private dwellings, a 21% change from its 2011 population of 167. With a land area of 1.12 km^{2} (0.43 sq mi), it had a population density of 180.4/km^{2} (467.1/sq mi) in 2016.

== See also ==
- List of communities in Alberta
- List of francophone communities in Alberta
- List of villages in Alberta
