= Dunmore, Alberta =

Dunmore
- Hamlet
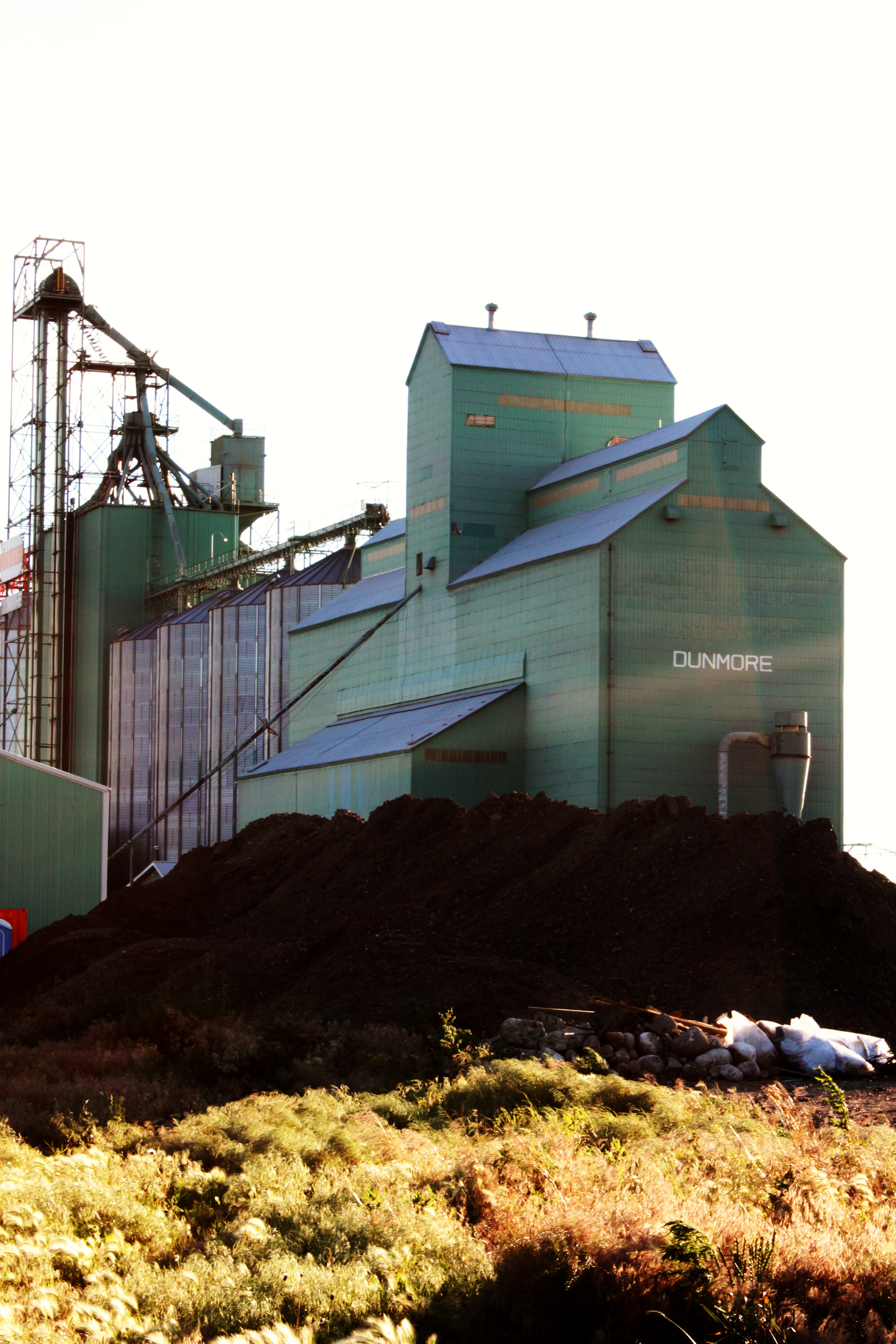
- Dunmore grain elevator

- Location of Dunmore in Alberta Dunmore (Alberta)
- Coordinates: 49°58′05″N 110°35′13″W
- Country: Canada
- Province: Alberta
- Region: Southern Alberta
- Municipal district: Cypress County
- Named for: Charles Murray, 7th Earl of Dunmore

Government
  - Type: Unincorporated
  - Body: Cypress County Council

Area (2021)
  - Land: 5.6 km^{2} (2.2 sq mi)

Population (2021)
  - Total: 1,088
  - Density: 194.3/km^{2} (503/sq mi)
- Time zone: UTC−06:00 (Alberta Time)
- Postal code FSA: T1B
- Highways: Highway 1 / Highway 41

Dunmore is a hamlet in Alberta, Canada, within Cypress County, 2.6 kilometres (1.6 mi) southeast of Medicine Hat's city limits on Highway 1 and the Canadian Pacific Railway mainline. A portion of the hamlet is recognized as a designated place by Statistics Canada.

Dunmore is the administrative centre of Cypress County and Prairie Rose School Division No. 8.

The hamlet was named by the CPR after one of its benefactors: Charles Murray, 7th Earl of Dunmore.

Dunmore was the site of a train collision in 1908 that killed most of both crews and seven passengers, eleven in all. The circumstances of the crash were spooky as both train engineers had witnessed a ghost train colliding with their trains at the location over the previous week.

== Demographics ==
In the 2021 Census of Population conducted by Statistics Canada, Dunmore had a population of 1,088 living in 374 of its 382 total private dwellings, a change of −1.1% from its 2016 population of 1,100. With a land area of 5.6 km^{2} (2.2 sq mi), it had a population density of 194.3/km^{2} (503.2/sq mi) in 2021.

Cypress County indicates that the population of the Hamlet of Dunmore was 1,097 in the 2016 Census, a change of 7% from its 2011 population of 1,025.

== Education ==
In the southeastern corner of the community is Eagle Butte High School, named after a geographic feature of the Cypress Hills. A one-room schoolhouse in the Cypress Hills was called "Eagle Butte School".

== Amenities and services ==
Located in the hamlet is Dunmore Park – which has a playground, outdoor hockey rink, baseball field, and a small BMX track. Dunmore has a gas station, a community hall, a storage unit business, a bar and various other small businesses.

== See also ==
- List of communities in Alberta
- List of designated places in Alberta
- List of former urban municipalities in Alberta
- List of hamlets in Alberta
