= Gurneyville, Alberta =

Coordinates: 54°08′23″N 110°45′24″W

Location of Gurneyville Alberta

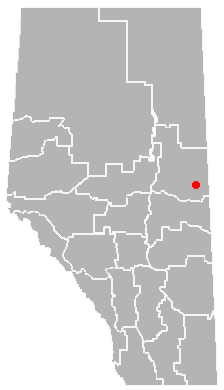
Location of Gurneyville, Census Division No. 12, Alberta.

Gurneyville is an unincorporated community in central Alberta in the Municipal District of Bonnyville No. 87, located on the west side of Muriel Lake, 11 kilometres (6.8 mi) north of Highway 41, 51 kilometres (32 mi) southwest of Cold Lake.

An early postmaster gave the community the maiden name of his wife.
