= Wild Horse Border Crossing =

Border crossing between Canada and the United States

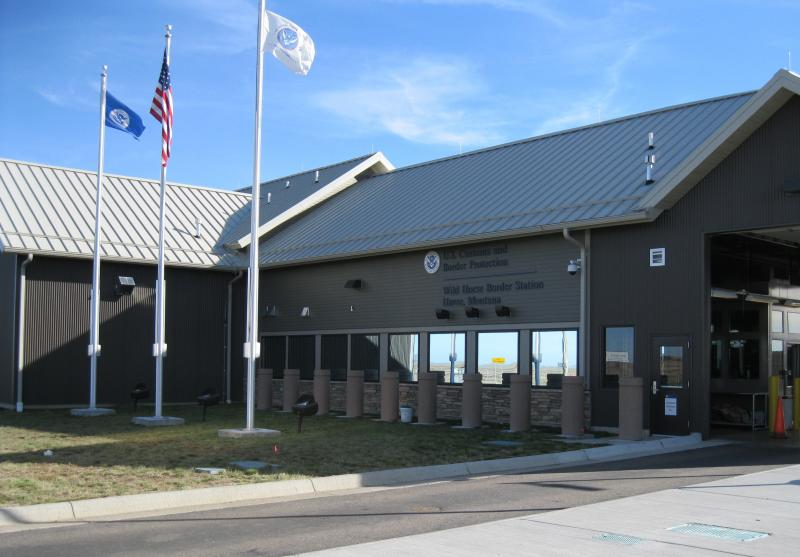
- US Border inspection station at Wild Horse, MT

Location
- Country: United States; Canada
- Location: S-232 / Highway 41; US Port: 29832 Wild Horse Road, Havre, Montana 59501; Canadian Port: Highway #41 South, Wild Horse, Alberta T0K 1L0
- Coordinates: 48.999349°N 110.215458°W

Details
- Opened: 1925

Website
- http://www.cbp.gov/contact/ports/wild-horse-mt

The Wild Horse Border Crossing connects the cities of Havre, Montana with Medicine Hat, Alberta on the Canada–United States border. It is reached by Montana Secondary Highway 232 on the American side and Alberta Highway 41 on the Canadian side. The crossing is so remote that government housing for border officials exists next to the station.

== History ==
The Wild Horse border crossing was established in 1925. In 2012, the US replaced its yellow brick border inspection facility, which was originally built in 1964. Prior to 1964, travelers were expected to proceed to a US Customs office in the city of Havre to report for inspection. CBP and CBSA have had issues in coordinating the hours of operation at this crossing for several years.

== Future ==
Beginning in 2014, three different Alberta-based REDAs (Regional Economic Development Associations), along with the U.S.-based Ports to Plains Alliance, have been lobbying for the Wild Horse Border Crossing to upgraded to a 24-hour crossing, as currently the Coutts–Sweetgrass Border Crossing is the only 24-hour crossing into Alberta. In 2023, Alberta Premier Danielle Smith and Montana Governor Greg Gianforte wrote a joint letter their respective federal governments to upgrade the border crossing to 24 hours.

== Climate ==
Climate data for Simpson 6 N - Wildhorse, Montana, 1991–2020 normals, 1931-2020 extremes: 2815ft (858m)
Month	Jan	Feb	Mar	Apr	May	Jun	Jul	Aug	Sep	Oct	Nov	Dec	Year
Record high °F (°C)	66 (19)	73 (23)	79 (26)	92 (33)	99 (37)	107 (42)	105 (41)	109 (43)	101 (38)	89 (32)	74 (23)	67 (19)	109 (43)
Mean maximum °F (°C)	50.3 (10.2)	52.8 (11.6)	64.2 (17.9)	77.4 (25.2)	85.6 (29.8)	91.1 (32.8)	97.9 (36.6)	97.9 (36.6)	91.5 (33.1)	79.0 (26.1)	62.9 (17.2)	50.7 (10.4)	99.4 (37.4)
Mean daily maximum °F (°C)	24.4 (−4.2)	29.5 (−1.4)	40.9 (4.9)	56.0 (13.3)	66.4 (19.1)	73.6 (23.1)	84.1 (28.9)	82.9 (28.3)	71.9 (22.2)	55.9 (13.3)	39.1 (3.9)	26.7 (−2.9)	54.3 (12.4)
Daily mean °F (°C)	13.3 (−10.4)	18.1 (−7.7)	29.0 (−1.7)	42.0 (5.6)	51.9 (11.1)	59.8 (15.4)	67.2 (19.6)	65.8 (18.8)	55.7 (13.2)	41.6 (5.3)	27.5 (−2.5)	15.9 (−8.9)	40.7 (4.8)
Mean daily minimum °F (°C)	2.3 (−16.5)	6.6 (−14.1)	17.0 (−8.3)	28.0 (−2.2)	37.3 (2.9)	45.9 (7.7)	50.4 (10.2)	48.8 (9.3)	39.6 (4.2)	27.3 (−2.6)	15.8 (−9.0)	5.0 (−15.0)	27.0 (−2.8)
Mean minimum °F (°C)	−26.7 (−32.6)	−19.6 (−28.7)	−7.2 (−21.8)	13.3 (−10.4)	23.7 (−4.6)	35.1 (1.7)	40.7 (4.8)	37.4 (3.0)	25.1 (−3.8)	7.2 (−13.8)	−7.4 (−21.9)	−19.8 (−28.8)	−34.8 (−37.1)
Record low °F (°C)	−49 (−45)	−52 (−47)	−36 (−38)	−18 (−28)	14 (−10)	27 (−3)	32 (0)	28 (−2)	14 (−10)	−20 (−29)	−32 (−36)	−47 (−44)	−52 (−47)
Average precipitation inches (mm)	0.35 (8.9)	0.30 (7.6)	0.50 (13)	0.85 (22)	1.91 (49)	2.45 (62)	1.06 (27)	1.23 (31)	1.15 (29)	0.62 (16)	0.43 (11)	0.30 (7.6)	11.15 (284.1)
Average snowfall inches (cm)	7.10 (18.0)	3.80 (9.7)	5.90 (15.0)	2.70 (6.9)	0.70 (1.8)	0.00 (0.00)	0.00 (0.00)	0.00 (0.00)	0.00 (0.00)	0.90 (2.3)	4.50 (11.4)	5.60 (14.2)	31.2 (79.3)
Source 1: NOAA
Source 2: XMACIS (temp records & monthly max/mins)

== See also ==
- List of Canada–United States border crossings
