= Red Rock Coulee =

Nature preserve in Canada

Red Rock Coulee Natural Area
- Large boulders (concretions) at Red Rock Coulee Natural Area

- Location within Alberta
- Interactive map of Red Rock Coulee Natural Area
- Location: County of Forty Mile No. 8 Alberta Canada
- Nearest city: Medicine Hat
- Coordinates: 49°39′18″N 110°51′46″W
- Area: 324.15 ha (801.0 acres)
- Governing body: Alberta Tourism, Parks and Recreation

Red Rock Coulee is a Provincial Natural Area in southeastern Alberta, Canada, 54 kilometres (30 mi) south-southwest of the city of Medicine Hat and 26 kilometres (20 mi) south of the hamlet of Seven Persons on Alberta Highway 887. The main feature of this natural landscape is the large spherical reddish boulders (concretions), some of which measure 2.5 metres (8.2 ft) in diameter. They are scattered across the badlands and coulees, and can be seen along the hiking trails, as well as from the viewpoint on Highway 887.

== Geologic setting ==
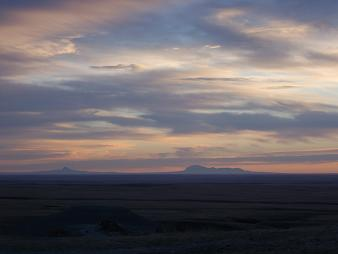
The Sweetgrass Hills in Montana seen from Red Rock Coulee

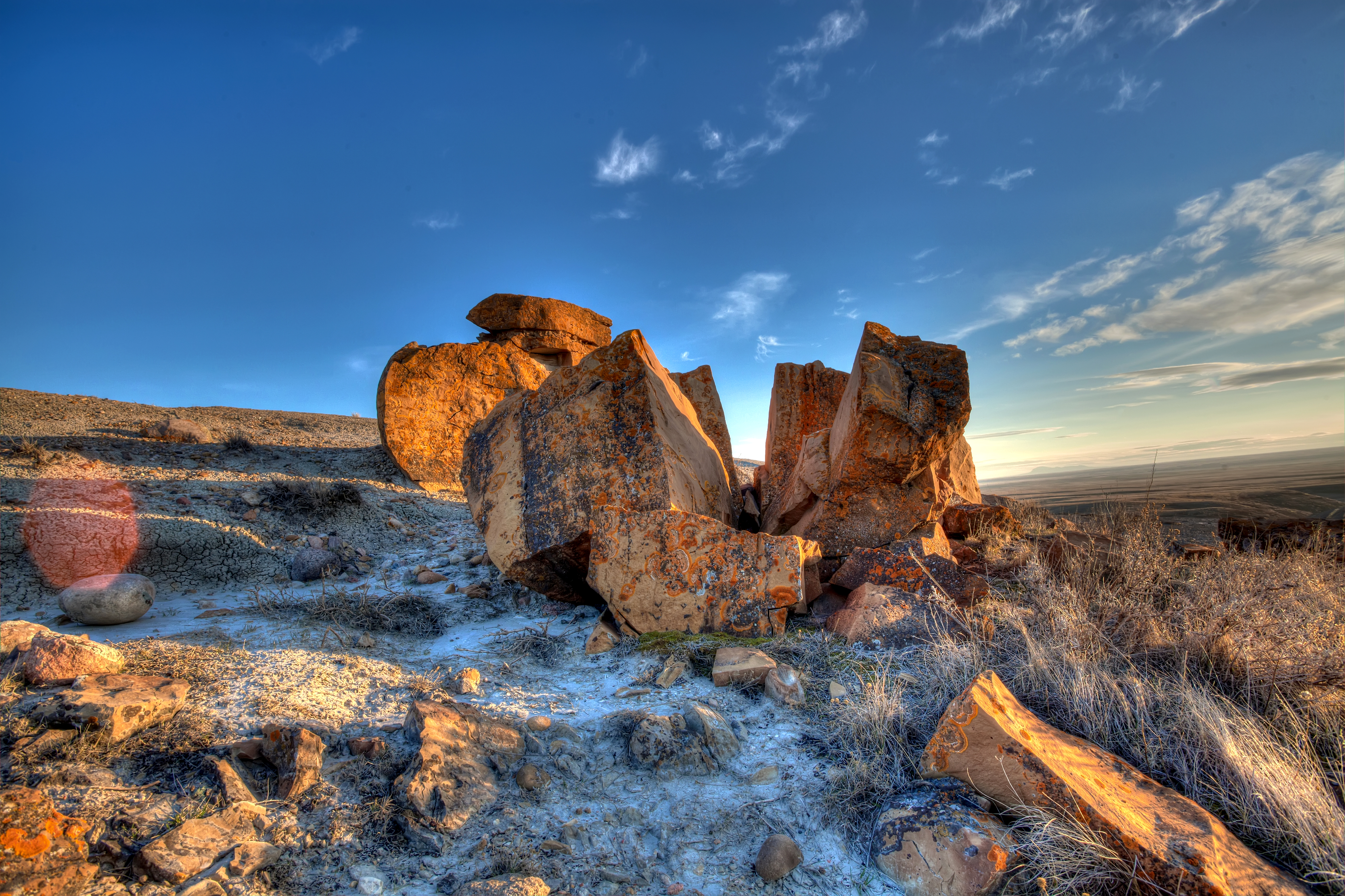
Red Rock Coulee at sunset

The large spherical concretions at Red Rocks Coulee are hosted in the Late Cretaceous (Campanian) Bearpaw Formation, which makes up the bedrock in the area. The formation lies close to surface under a thin layer of soil, and it has been sculpted by erosion, exposing the concretions and creating areas of badlands and hoodoos. The dark gray shale, with beds of greenish and gray sandstone and siltstone, pale grey bentonite, and brown ironstone in the bedrock create bands of color across the exposed badlands. The Bearpaw Formation was deposited in the Western Interior Seaway. It includes a variety of marine fossils, primarily remains of ammonites, bivalves, and fish.

The concretions formed after the sediments had been deposited, when mineral cement, primarily calcite and ironstone, precipitated around bits of shell, bone, and other biological debris. The concretions grew outward as circulating waters deposited more layers of cement. The cement makes the concretions resistant to erosion compared to the surrounding sediments, and the iron minerals give them their reddish color. Close examination of the concretions may reveal traces of the original bedding and other sedimentary structures. There may also be "growth rings" produced by the layers of cement, as well as remnants of the fossils that were the nucleus for cementation.

== Flora and fauna ==
Red Rock Coulee sits within grasslands of the mixed grass and dry mixed grass type. Sagebrush, juniper shrubs, and prickly pear cactus grow on the coulee walls, and on the uplands there are colorful wildflowers such as prairie crocus, gumbo evening primrose, yellow umbrella plant, and broomweed. Animals that are adapted to the harsh, dry conditions at the coulee include white-tailed jackrabbit, mule deer, pronghorn, Richardson's ground squirrel, prairie rattlesnake, bullsnake, and greater short-horned lizard. There are also northern scorpions, which are rare in Alberta. Birds sighted in the area include prairie falcon, western meadowlark, Sprague's pipit, longspur, and rock wren.

== See also ==
- List of coulees in Alberta
- List of lakes in Alberta
- Geography of Alberta
- Coulee
