= Cecil, Alberta =

Coordinates: 50.11679°N 111.60175°W

Cecil is a locality in Cypress County, Alberta, Canada.

Cecil has the name of Cecil Cameron, the wife of a railroad official.
