= Derwent, Alberta =

Derwent
- Hamlet
- Location in Alberta
- Coordinates: 53°39′14.9″N 110°58′01.1″W
- Country: Canada
- Province: Alberta
- Region: Central Alberta
- Census division: 10
- Municipal district: County of Two Hills No. 21
- Founded: 1928
- Incorporated (Village): June 25, 1930
- Dissolved: September 1, 2010

Government
  - Governing Body: County of Two Hills No. 21 Council
  - Reeve: Murray Phillips

Area (2021)
  - Land: 0.37 km^{2} (0.14 sq mi)
- Elevation: 617 m (2,024 ft)

Population (2021)
  - Total: 96
  - Density: 261.4/km^{2} (677/sq mi)
- Time zone: UTC−06:00 (Alberta Time)
- Highways: Highway 45; Highway 41
- Waterway: Lac Cote

Derwent is a hamlet in central Alberta, Canada within the County of Two Hills No. 21. It is located on Highway 45, approximately 41 kilometres (25 mi) north of Vermilion.

Derwent dissolved from village status to become a hamlet on September 1, 2010. It originally incorporated as a village on June 25, 1930.

== Demographics ==
In the 2021 Census of Population conducted by Statistics Canada, Derwent had a population of 96 living in 54 of its 59 total private dwellings, a change of 12.9% from its 2016 population of 85. With a land area of 0.37 km^{2} (0.14 sq mi), it had a population density of 259.5/km^{2} (672.0/sq mi) in 2021.

As a designated place in the 2016 Census of Population conducted by Statistics Canada, Derwent had a population of 85 living in 47 of its 68 total private dwellings, a change of −15% from its 2011 population of 100. With a land area of 0.37 km^{2} (0.14 sq mi), it had a population density of 229.7/km^{2} (595.0/sq mi) in 2016.

== Location ==
Derwent lies 41 km north of Vermilion, 35 km south of Elk Point, 20 km east of Myrnam, and 38 km west of Dewberry on Highway 45, 7 km west of Highway 41.

== History ==
Established in 1928 when the Canadian Pacific Railway opened a rail line through the region, it was named after Derwent, Derbyshire, England. Prior to this name, the community was briefly known as Monkman (purportedly after the temporary stay in the community of Albert Monkman, an important member of the 1885 Metis Provisional Government headed by Louis Riel) and, before that, the Native Americans of the region referred to it as Penguix. The population peaked at 301 in 1959, but declined rapidly after the construction of the bridge to Elk Point and the closure of the local grain elevator. The subsequent abandonment of the Lloydminster to Starr rail line in 2005 - 2007 signaled the final chapter in Derwent's rail access. Only two new homes have been built since the 1980s and the last business building permit issued was in 2001.

== Education ==
There are no schools currently operating in Derwent. The nearest public school is New Myrnam School (K-12) in Myrnam.

== See also ==
- List of communities in Alberta
- List of former urban municipalities in Alberta
- List of hamlets in Alberta
