= Eagle Butte crater =

Coordinates: 49°42′N 110°30′W

Eagle Butte is an impact crater in Alberta, Canada, named for a rural area west of the Cypress Hills.

It is 10 km in diameter and the age is estimated to be less than 65 million years (Paleocene or earlier). The crater is not exposed at the surface.
