= Simpson Park =

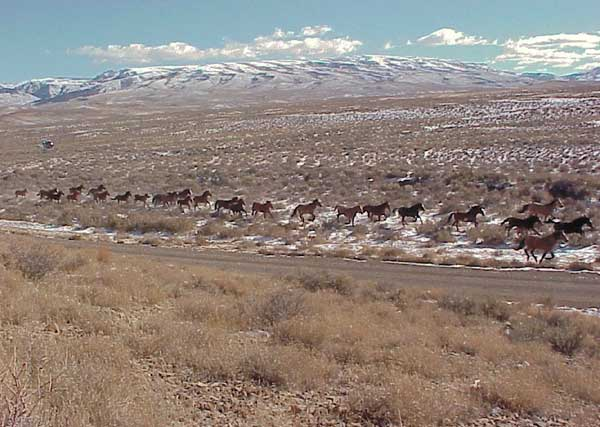

- Location within Nevada
- Floor elevation: 6,453 ft (1,967 m)

Geography
- Location: Lander County, Nevada, United States
- Borders on: W: Toiyabe Range; E: Simpson Park Mountains
- Coordinates: 39.5154814°N 116.9692537°W
- Interactive map of Simpson Park

Simpson Park is a valley south of Grass Valley, Nevada that contained a Pony Express station location of Pony Express Division Four.
