= List of storms named Agatha =

The name Agatha has been used for eleven tropical cyclones in the East Pacific Ocean and one in the South Pacific.

In the East Pacific:

- Tropical Storm Agatha (1967) – stayed well away from land
- Hurricane Agatha (1971) – Category 2 hurricane, made landfall in the state of Michoacán, causing moderate damage
- Hurricane Agatha (1975) – Category 1 hurricane, moved northwest off the Mexican coast
- Hurricane Agatha (1980) – Category 3 hurricane, stayed well out to sea
- Hurricane Agatha (1986) – Category 1 hurricane, moved eastward parallel to the Mexican coastline
- Tropical Storm Agatha (1992) – approached but did not reach the Mexican coast
- Tropical Storm Agatha (1998) – stayed well clear of land
- Tropical Storm Agatha (2004) – stayed off the Mexican coast; did not affect land
- Tropical Storm Agatha (2010) – made landfall on the coast of Guatemala, bringing widespread floods to much of Central America, killing 204 and causing nearly $1.1 billion (2010 USD) in damages
- Tropical Storm Agatha (2016) – churned in the open ocean
- Hurricane Agatha (2022) – Category 2 hurricane, made landfall in Oaxaca

In the South Pacific:

- Cyclone Agatha (1972) – traversed the Cook Islands

== See also ==
- Tropical Storm Agathe (1976) – a South-West Indian Ocean tropical cyclone with a similar name
