= Bullshead, Alberta =

Coordinates: 49.9297°N 110.7435°W

Bullshead is a locality in Alberta, Canada.

Bullshead was so named on account of a nearby hill which had the form of a buffalo's head.
