= La Corey =

- Hamlet
- Location of La Corey La Corey (Canada)
- Coordinates: 54°26′36″N 110°45′34″W
- Country: Canada
- Province: Alberta
- Region: Central Alberta
- Census division: 12
- Municipal district: Municipal District of Bonnyville No. 87

Government
  - Type: Unincorporated
  - Governing body: Municipal District of Bonnyville No. 87 Council

Population (2014)
  - Total: 59
- Time zone: UTC−06:00 (Alberta Time)
- Area codes: 780, 587, 825

La Corey is a hamlet in central Alberta, Canada within the Municipal District of Bonnyville No. 87, located on Highway 55 approximately 38 kilometres (24 mi) west of Cold Lake.

== Demographics ==
In 2014, the population of La Corey according to the 2014 municipal census conducted by the Municipal District of Bonnyville No. 87 was 59.

== See also ==
- List of communities in Alberta
- List of hamlets in Alberta
