= Illingworth, Alberta =

Coordinates: 50.11679°N 111.45174°W

Illingworth is a locality in Alberta, Canada.

The locality has the name of W. J. Illingworth, a railroad official.
