= Division No. 1, Alberta =

Census division in Canada

Coordinates: 50°02′N 110°40′W

Division No. 1
- Census division in Alberta
- Country: Canada
- Province: Alberta

Area
  - Total: 20,526 km^{2} (7,925 sq mi)

Population (2021)
  - Total: 82,513
  - Density: 4.0199/km^{2} (10.412/sq mi)

Division No. 1 is a census division in Alberta, Canada. It is located in the southeast corner of southern Alberta and surrounds the City of Medicine Hat. The division is made up of the counties of Cypress and Forty Mile No. 8.

== Census subdivisions ==
The following census subdivisions (municipalities or municipal equivalents) are located within Alberta's Division No. 1.

- Cities
  - Medicine Hat
- Towns
  - Bow Island
  - Redcliff
- Villages
  - Foremost
- Hamlets
  - Burdett
  - Desert Blume
  - Dunmore
  - Etzikom
  - Hilda
  - Irvine
  - Manyberries
  - Orion
  - Schuler
  - Seven Persons
  - Skiff
  - Suffield
  - Veinerville
  - Walsh
- Municipal districts
  - Cypress County
  - Forty Mile No. 8, County of

== Demographics ==
Historical population
| Year | Pop. | ±% |
|---|---|---|
| 1991 | 58,197 | — |
| 1996 | 62,330 | +7.1% |
| 2001 | 67,402 | +8.1% |
| 2006 | 74,550 | +10.6% |
| 2011 | 78,694 | +5.6% |
| 2016 | 82,627 | +5.0% |
| 2021 | 82,513 | −0.1% |

In the 2021 Census of Population conducted by Statistics Canada, Division No. 1 had a population of 82,513 living in 33,807 of its 36,097 total private dwellings, a change of −0.1% from its 2016 population of 82,627. With a land area of 20,277.52 km^{2} (7,829.19 sq mi), it had a population density of 4.1/km^{2} (10.5/sq mi) in 2021.

== See also ==
- List of census divisions of Alberta
- List of communities in Alberta
