= Cressday, Alberta =

Locality in Alberta, Canada

Location of Cressday, Alberta

Cressday is a locality in Alberta, Canada.

The locality's name is an amalgamation of the surnames of W. Cresswell and Tony Day, cattlemen.
