= Wild Horse, Alberta =

Community in Alberta, Canada

Coordinates: 49°00′00″N 110°12′58″W

Location of Wild Horse Alberta

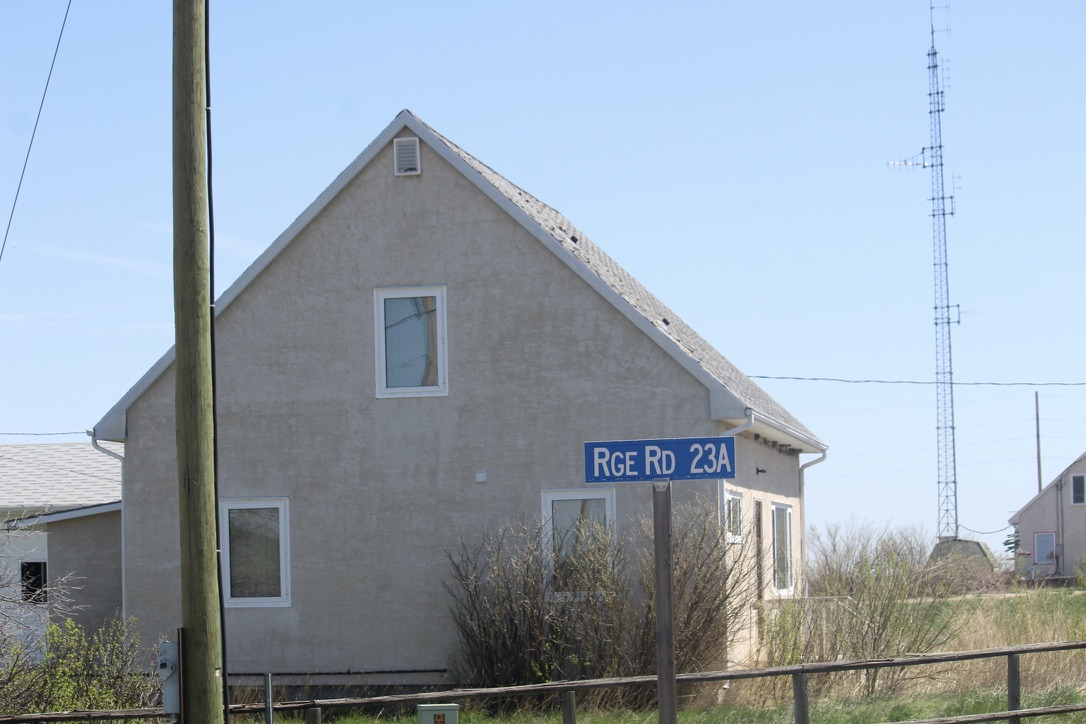
House in Wild Horse, Alberta

Wild Horse is an unincorporated community in southern Alberta within Cypress County, Canada on the Canada–United States border. It is located on Highway 41, approximately 120 km (75 mi) southeast of Medicine Hat.

Wild Horse also serves as a port of entry into the U.S. state of Montana as it is located at a border crossing with the United States, where Highway 41 meets Montana Secondary Highway 232. The Canada Border Services Agency office 711 is located here. On the other side of the border is Hill County, Montana.

== See also ==
- Wild Horse Border Crossing
