= Irvine, Alberta =

Irvine
- Hamlet
- Downtown, 2026

- Location of Irvine in Alberta Irvine (Alberta)
- Coordinates: 49.9553°N 110.2767°W
- Country: Canada
- Province: Alberta
- Census division: No. 1
- Municipal district: Cypress County

Government
  - Type: Unincorporated
  - Governing body: Cypress County Council
- Elevation: 763 m (2,503 ft)

Population (2011)
  - Total: 291
- Time zone: UTC−06:00 (Alberta Time)
- Postal codes: T0J 1V0
- Area code: 403

Irvine is a hamlet in Alberta, Canada within Cypress County. It is located approximately 35 kilometres (22 mi) east of Medicine Hat on Highway 1 and has an elevation of 763 metres (2,503 ft). The hamlet is located in census division No. 1 and in the federal riding of Medicine Hat.

== History ==
The vast prairies were home to the Cree and other indigenous groups who traversed the area in and around the nearby Cypress Hills, following the routes of the bison. By 1870, the bison were all but gone. The Palliser Expedition passed through the region in 1859. Métis settled in the hills during the mid-1860s, and the Cypress Hills Massacre occurred in 1873.

A settlement developed around a trading post, and became known as 20 Mile Post - 20 miles from the next trading post at Medicine Hat. It later was renamed Irvine in honour of Colonel A. Irvine, a commissioner of the North-West Mounted Police who served with General F.D. Middleton during the North-West Rebellion of 1885.

In early May 1883, the push was on to complete the Canadian Pacific Railway line from just east of Walsh to Medicine Hat. Crews of gandy dancers worked hard, building the rail line through 20 Mile Post, and reaching Medicine Hat on May 31. Trains brought Europeans with high hopes for their futures to the area. Today, long freight trains roll through Irvine rather quickly.

Many German-Russian settlers homesteaded in the area and some of their descendants remain in and around Irvine to this day. The century-old St. George's Parish Cemetery bares evidence of this history.

Prior to September 1, 1905, the community was within the jurisdiction of the Assiniboia District of the Northwest Territories. It then became part of the Province of Alberta.

Irvine was once a thriving community, complete with an elected mayor and town council, several churches, businesses, etc. Several grain elevators once thrust their lofty towers to the sky. Blacksmith shops were kept busy making and repairing equipment for local ranchers and farmers. Agriculture is the mainstay of the district's economy. When Primere Getty (elected 1985) Changed the number of population required to be a town, Irvine was downgraded to a hamlet, the loss of autonomy, external centralized bylaws/enforcement and taxation discouraged businesses to relocate or to start up in Irvine. Over the decades, however, the demographic has aged and the town businesses closed their doors one by one, and the school was down graded (county decision after the school fire) from K-12 to a K-9 and the grain elevators demolished and rebuilt at the county seat the hamlet has Faltered. There is one surviving church, the old town office building on the main street occupied by a quaint restaurant, the historic Irvine bar, the complex (hockey and curling), Museum and several small businesses.

== Geography ==
An unusual geological formation was discovered northeast of Irvine when Google Earth images showed what has become known as the Badlands Guardian, a shape in the land that looks like a North American Indian wearing a feathered warbonnet.

== Demographics ==
Cypress County indicates that the population of the Hamlet of Irvine was 307 in the 2016 Census, a change of 5.5% from its 2011 population of 291.

Alberta Homestead Map — circa 1918 Township 11 & 12 — Range 1, 2 & 3 — Walsh, Lamour, Irvine, Pashley

== Arts and culture ==
During the September long weekend, Irvine is home to the 20 Mile Post Days. This annual event includes a pancake breakfast hosted by the Lions Club, a parade, craft show and bench show, a Cowboy Church and a rodeo. It is known as 20 Mile Post Days because it is approximately 20 miles (32 km) from Medicine Hat.

== Attractions ==
Irvine is home to the Prairie Memories Museum, where visitors can wander through a "town square" setting to see an early 20th-century church, a one-room school house, a family home, old cabin and lumber store, as well as a small railway memorabilia collection. The museum building, housed in the former immigration hall, has a respectable historical collection.

== Infrastructure ==
Amenities in Irvine include a library, school pre-k to grade 9, a church, small hotel / bar, a hockey arena and curling rinks.

== Education ==
Irvine features a school (kindergarten through grade 9).

== See also ==
- List of communities in Alberta
- List of former urban municipalities in Alberta
- List of hamlets in Alberta
