= Walsh, Alberta =

Walsh
- Hamlet
- Location of Walsh in Alberta
- Coordinates: 49.9472°N 110.0425°W
- Country: Canada
- Province: Alberta
- Census division: No. 1
- Municipal district: Cypress County

Government
  - Type: Unincorporated
  - Governing body: Cypress County Council

Area (2021)
  - Land: 1.22 km^{2} (0.47 sq mi)
- Elevation: 745 m (2,444 ft)

Population (2021)
  - Total: 50
  - Density: 41/km^{2} (110/sq mi)
- Time zone: UTC−06:00 (Alberta Time)

Walsh is a hamlet in Alberta, Canada within Cypress County.

It is located along the Trans-Canada Highway, immediately west of the Saskatchewan border, and has an elevation of 745 metres (2,444 ft).

The hamlet is located in Census Division No. 1 and in the federal riding of Medicine Hat.

Walsh is likely named for the prominent North-West Mounted Police officer, James Walsh, who established a fort there in the early days of that organization.

== Demographics ==
In the 2021 Census of Population conducted by Statistics Canada, Walsh had a population of 50 living in 26 of its 32 total private dwellings, a change of −16.7% from its 2016 population of 60. With a land area of 1.22 km^{2} (0.47 sq mi), it had a population density of 41.0/km^{2} (106.1/sq mi) in 2021.

As a designated place in the 2016 Census of Population conducted by Statistics Canada, Walsh had a population of 60 living in 27 of its 35 total private dwellings, a change of 3.4% from its 2011 population of 58. With a land area of 1.25 km^{2} (0.48 sq mi), it had a population density of 48.0/km^{2} (124.3/sq mi) in 2016.

== See also ==
- List of communities in Alberta
- List of designated places in Alberta
- List of former urban municipalities in Alberta
- List of hamlets in Alberta
