= Seven Persons =

- Hamlet
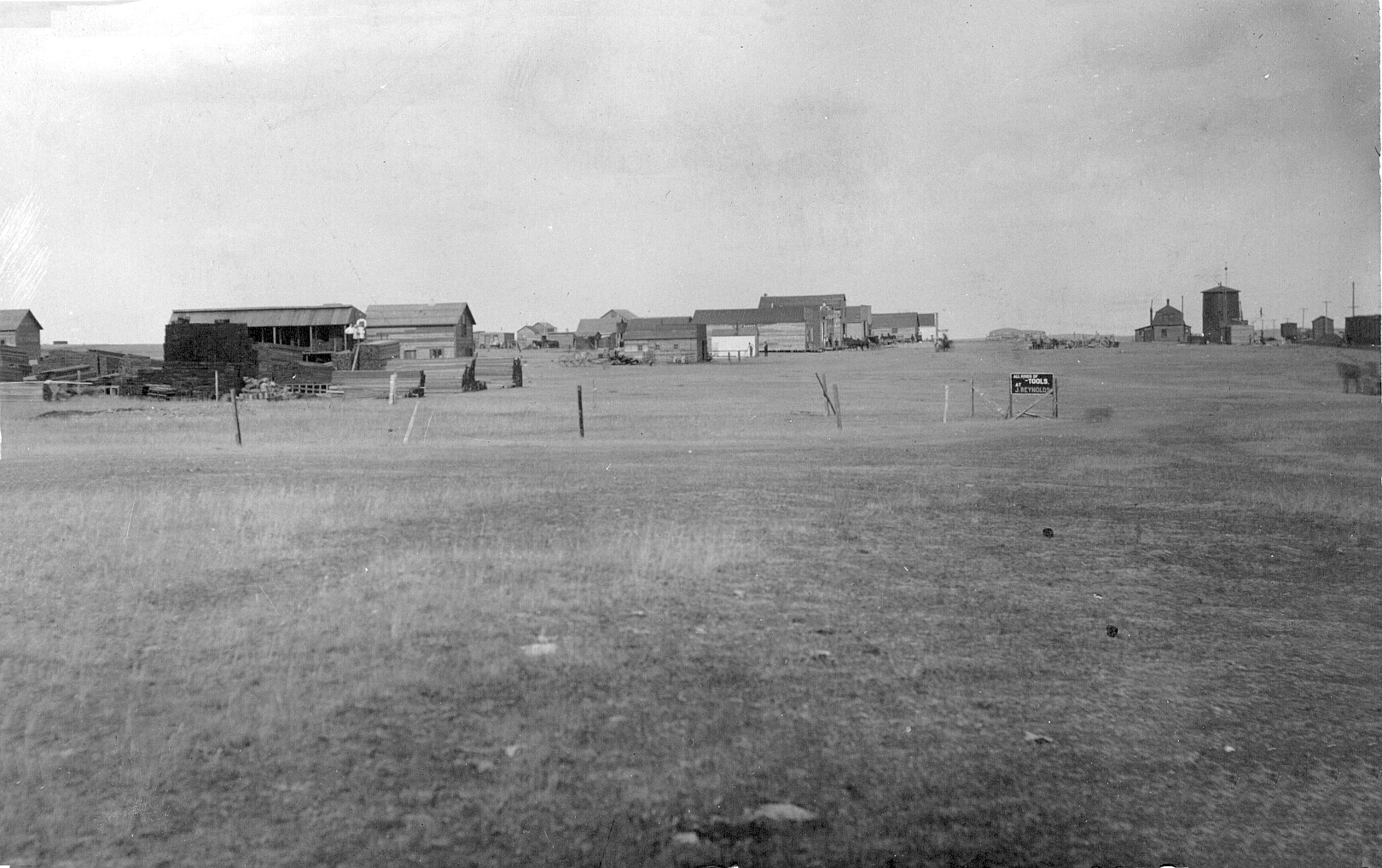
- Seven Persons, 1911

- Location of Seven Persons in Alberta
- Coordinates: 49.8742°N 110.9058°W
- Country: Canada
- Province: Alberta
- Census division: No. 1
- Municipal district: Cypress County

Government
  - Type: Unincorporated
  - Governing body: Cypress County Council

Area (2021)
  - Land: 1.05 km^{2} (0.41 sq mi)
- Elevation: 755 m (2,477 ft)

Population (2021)
  - Total: 277
  - Density: 263.8/km^{2} (683/sq mi)
- Time zone: UTC−06:00 (Alberta Time)

Seven Persons is a hamlet in Alberta, Canada within Cypress County. It is located approximately 20 kilometres (12 mi) southwest of Medicine Hat on Highway 3 and has an elevation of 755 metres (2,477 ft).

The hamlet is located in Census Division No. 1 and in the federal riding of Medicine Hat—Cardston—Warner.

== Etymology ==
The hamlet is named after Seven Persons Creek, and there are various stories about the origin of the creek's name, according to The Mysteries of Canada website.

== Demographics ==
In the 2021 Census of Population conducted by Statistics Canada, Seven Persons had a population of 277 living in 107 of its 110 total private dwellings, a change of 0.7% from its 2016 population of 275. With a land area of 1.05 km^{2} (0.41 sq mi), it had a population density of 263.8/km^{2} (683.3/sq mi) in 2021.

As a designated place in the 2016 Census of Population conducted by Statistics Canada, Seven Persons had a population of 249 living in 94 of its 100 total private dwellings, a change of 7.8% from its 2011 population of 231. With a land area of 0.52 km^{2} (0.20 sq mi), it had a population density of 478.8/km^{2} (1,240.2/sq mi) in 2016.

Cypress County indicates that the population of the Hamlet of Seven Persons was 275 in the 2016 Census, a change of 1.9% from its 2011 population of 270.

== See also ==
- List of communities in Alberta
- List of designated places in Alberta
- List of hamlets in Alberta
- Red Rock Coulee
