= Agatha, Alberta =

Locality in Alberta, Canada

Coordinates: 50.133°N 111.283°W

Agatha is an unincorporated area in southeastern Alberta, Canada. It was named after Lady Agatha Hindlip.
