= Redcliff, Alberta =

Redcliff
- Town
- Town of Redcliff
- Seal
- Motto: Greenhouse Capital of the Prairies
- Location of Redcliff in Alberta
- Coordinates: 50°04′45″N 110°46′42″W
- Country: Canada
- Province: Alberta
- Region: Southern Alberta
- Census division: 1
- Municipal district: Cypress County
- Incorporated
  - Village: October 29, 1910
  - Town: August 5, 1912

Government
  - Mayor: Chris Czember
  - Governing body: Redcliff Town Council
  - MP: Glen Motz (CPC-Medicine Hat—Cardston—Warner)
  - MLA: Danielle Smith (UCP- Brooks-Medicine Hat)

Area (2021)
  - Land: 16.15 km^{2} (6.24 sq mi)
- Elevation: 745 m (2,444 ft)

Population (2021)
  - Total: 5,581
  - Density: 345.5/km^{2} (895/sq mi)
- Time zone: UTC−06:00 (Alberta Time)
- Postal code span: T0J
- Area code: +1-403
- Website: Official website

Redcliff is a town in southern Alberta, Canada. Adjacent to the City of Medicine Hat to the east and Cypress County to the west and north, the town is bisected by Highway 1 (Trans-Canada Highway) and is located on the north bank of the South Saskatchewan River.

Situated at a high elevation relative to the surrounding landscape, the Town of Redcliff offers views of the South Saskatchewan River valley, the City of Medicine Hat, and Cypress Hills. The cliffs that overlook the river valley resemble badland formations.

== History ==
Redcliff's history began in the 1880s with the discovery of abundant coal and natural gas reserves. Access to this inexpensive resource led to Redcliff being promoted as the "Smokeless manufacturing centre of the West". This drew industries that manufactured diverse products such as shoes, gloves, cigars, trucks, bricks, glass, and flour among others. On June 25, 1915, a violent F4 tornado (at the time called a cyclone) ravaged several of these businesses, thus starting a decline in Redcliff's economy. World War I and a flu epidemic ended the economic prosperity. The community experienced a resurgence in growth following World War II.

=== Name ===
The name of the town originated from the elevated red shale banks of the South Saskatchewan River. Currently, Redcliff is spelled as one word without an 'E', however historically it has been spelled Redcliffe, Red Cliff, and Red-Cliff.

Originally, the town was slated to be named Stonerville, after the town's doctor.

== Demographics ==
Historical population
Year	Pop.	±%
1936	990	—
1941	1,103	+11.4%
1946	1,289	+16.9%
1951	1,538	+19.3%
1956	2,001	+30.1%
1961	2,178	+8.8%
1966	2,247	+3.2%
1971	2,242	−0.2%
1976	2,991	+33.4%
1981	3,641	+21.7%
1986	3,834	+5.3%
1991	3,768	−1.7%
1996	4,104	+8.9%
2001	4,372	+6.5%
2006	5,096	+16.6%
2011	5,588	+9.7%
2016	5,600	+0.2%

In the 2021 Census of Population conducted by Statistics Canada, the Town of Redcliff had a population of 5,581 living in 2,186 of its 2,276 total private dwellings, a change of −0.3% from its 2016 population of 5,600. With a land area of 16.15 km^{2} (6.24 sq mi), it had a population density of 345.6/km^{2} (895.0/sq mi) in 2021.

In the 2016 Census of Population conducted by Statistics Canada, the Town of Redcliff recorded a population of 5,600 living in 2,159 of its 2,232 total private dwellings, a 0.2% change from its 2011 population of 5,588. With a land area of 16.25 km^{2} (6.27 sq mi), it had a population density of 344.6/km^{2} (892.5/sq mi) in 2016.

In 2022 Redcliff had a total population of 6,104 a year over year increase of 3.83%.

== Economy ==
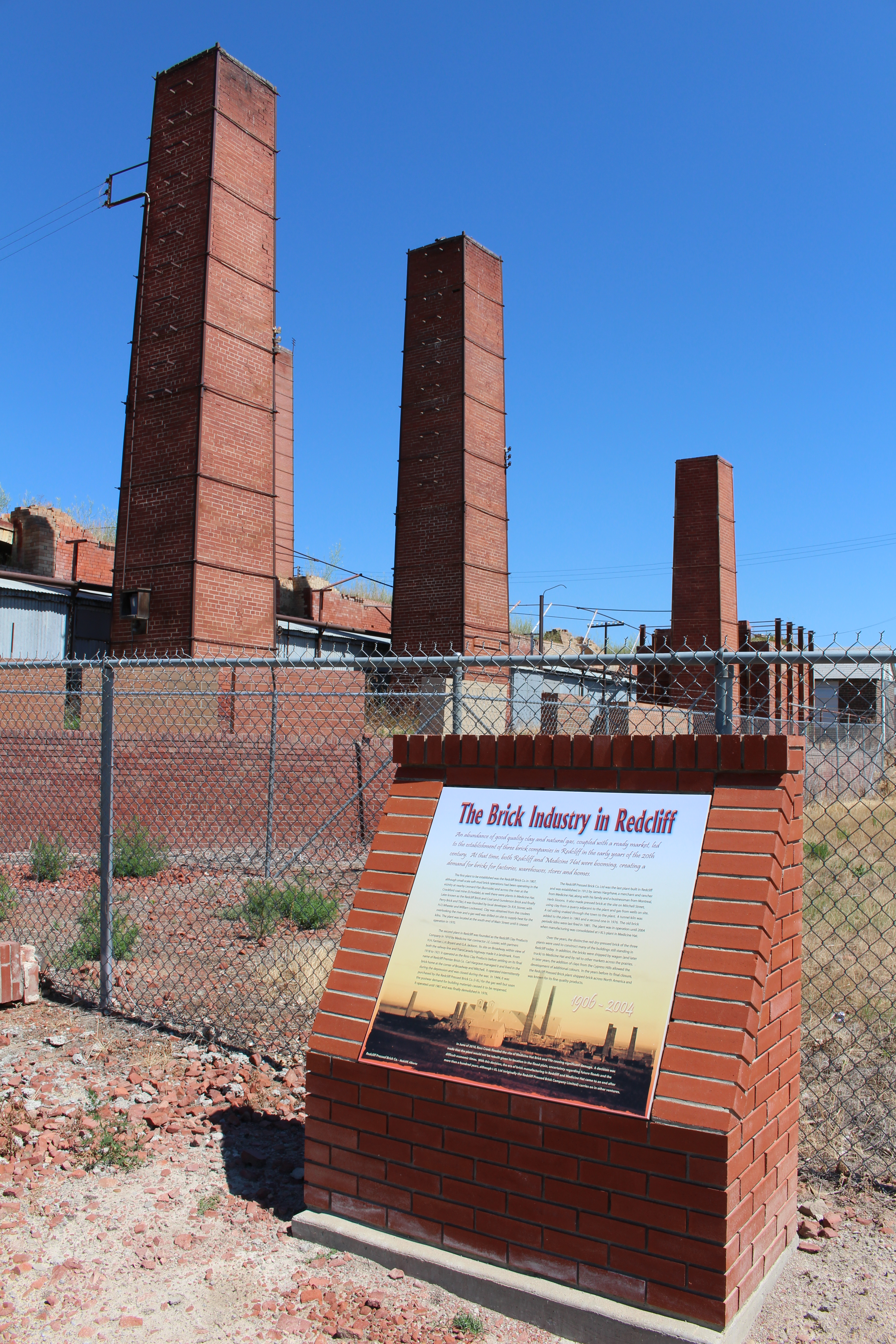
A brick manufacturing plant

The primary industries that support the local economy relate to oil and gas and the climate of southern Alberta. Numerous businesses in Redcliff and area provide drilling and pipeline services to support the oil and gas industry. The area's sunny climate and abundance of affordable natural gas reserves has contributed to the establishment of a sizable greenhouse industry. Greenhouse products include vegetables (sweet bell peppers, beefsteak tomatoes, tomatoes on the vine, and long English cucumbers), a variety of flowering plants, and some trees.

In the past, Redcliff was known for the production of glass, brick and pottery products. Some of these factories have since moved to Medicine Hat, such as the IXL brick plant, while others are no longer in existence.

Redcliff is a member of the Economic Development Alliance of Southeast Alberta.

== Culture ==
- Redcliff Museum
- Redcliff Public Library
- Redcliff Brick and Coal Factory monuments and plaques (where the factories were before they closed, and torn down in ~2012)

== Attractions ==
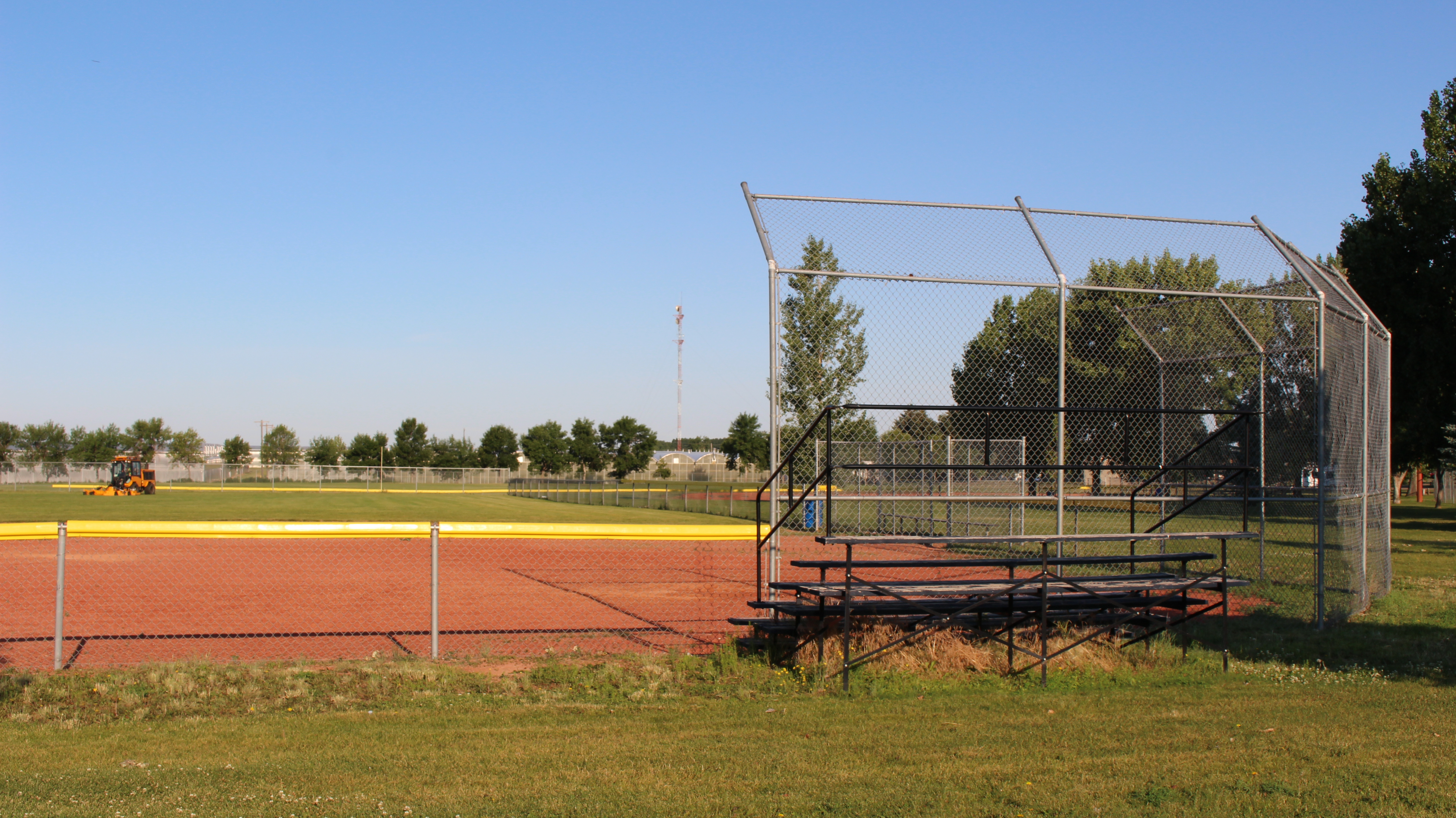
One of the baseball fields in Redcliff

Redcliff has the following attractions:

- an aquatic centre featuring a heated 25 m (82 ft) outdoor pool with varying depths and a heated children's pool with a water play structure;
- the Redcliff Rectangle, a multi-purpose ice hockey facility;
- a curling rink featuring three sheets of ice;
- six parks including the 3-acre (1.2 ha) River Valley Park adjacent to the South Saskatchewan River that features a kitchen, washrooms, firepit, and walking trails;
- the 18-hole Riverview Golf Course adjacent to the Riverview residential subdivision and the cliffs of the South Saskatchewan River valley;
- the Redcliff Campground that has capacity for 48 units;
- four softball/baseball diamonds of various sizes; and
- a moderately sized BMX track.
- a small skate park.
- A free, to the public outdoors, splash park (Located at Lions Park)
- Seniors drop in centre.
- Redcliff Days (typically occurs in June of each year)
- Redcliff also has a vast network of bicycle and walking trails.

== Education ==
The Prairie Rose School Division No. 8 operates the following four schools in Redcliff that provide programming for children from kindergarten through grade 12.

- Isabel F. Cox Elementary School (K–3)
- Margaret Wooding Elementary School (4–6)
- Parkside Junior High School (7–9)
- Redcliff Mennonite Alternative Program Outreach School (K-12), was previously located in Redcliff, and is now located in the City of Medicine Hat.

High school students attend Eagle Butte High School in Dunmore, or enter the Medicine Hat School District No. 76 or Medicine Hat Catholic Separate Regional Division No. 20 for grades 10 through 12.

== See also ==
- List of communities in Alberta
- List of towns in Alberta
