= Schuler, Alberta =

Schuler
- Hamlet
- Location of Schuler Schuler (Canada)
- Coordinates: 50°19′53″N 110°06′27″W
- Country: Canada
- Province: Alberta
- Region: Southern Alberta
- Census division: 1
- Municipal district: Cypress County

Government
  - Type: Unincorporated
  - Governing body: Cypress County Council

Area (2021)
  - Land: 0.6 km^{2} (0.23 sq mi)

Population (2021)
  - Total: 86
  - Density: 142.8/km^{2} (370/sq mi)
- Time zone: UTC−06:00 (Alberta Time)
- Area codes: 403, 587, 825

Schuler is a hamlet in southern Alberta, Canada within Cypress County, located 4 kilometres (2.5 mi) east of Highway 41, approximately 40 kilometres (25 mi) northeast of Medicine Hat.

== History ==
The settlement was named after Norman Banks Schuler, who settled a homestead in the area in the spring of 1910. In the fall of that year he was given the Post Office for the district. The hamlet itself acts as a service centre for people on the surrounding farms. Grain elevators were built by the Alberta Wheat Pool in 1924 and 1928 and by the Pioneer Grain Company in 1928. In July 1997, the last train hauled grain from the two remaining elevators. It is home to an ECS to Grade 9 school.

== Demographics ==
Population history of Schuler
Year	Pop.	±%
1941	113	—
1951	131	+15.9%
1956	157	+19.8%
1961	156	−0.6%
1966	116	−25.6%
1971	97	−16.4%
1976	121	+24.7%
1981	105	−13.2%
1986	97	−7.6%
1991	88	−9.3%
1991A	92	+4.5%
1996	104	+13.0%
2001	89	−14.4%
2006	81	−9.0%
2011	63	−22.2%
2016	72	+14.3%
2021	86	+19.4%
Source: Statistics Canada

In the 2021 Census of Population conducted by Statistics Canada, Schuler had a population of 86 living in 38 of its 42 total private dwellings, a change of 19.4% from its 2016 population of 72. With a land area of 0.6 km^{2} (0.23 sq mi), it had a population density of 143.3/km^{2} (371.2/sq mi) in 2021.

As a designated place in the 2016 Census of Population conducted by Statistics Canada, Schuler had a population of 72 living in 35 of its 39 total private dwellings, a change of 14.3% from its 2011 population of 63. With a land area of 0.6 km^{2} (0.23 sq mi), it had a population density of 120.0/km^{2} (310.8/sq mi) in 2016.

== See also ==
- List of communities in Alberta
- List of designated places in Alberta
- List of hamlets in Alberta
