= Eagle Butte, Alberta =

Coordinates: 49°36′18″N 110°26′02″W

Eagle Butte is a rural area south of Medicine Hat and west of the Cypress Hills. It is home to Saint Margaret's Church. Formerly there was a NWMP post in the area. The first post office opened in 1900. The locality takes its name from a nearby butte of the same name. It is near the location of a confirmed impact crater 10 km in diameter at 49°42'N110°31'W around 65 million years ago.
