= Bonnyville =

- Town
- Town of Bonnyville
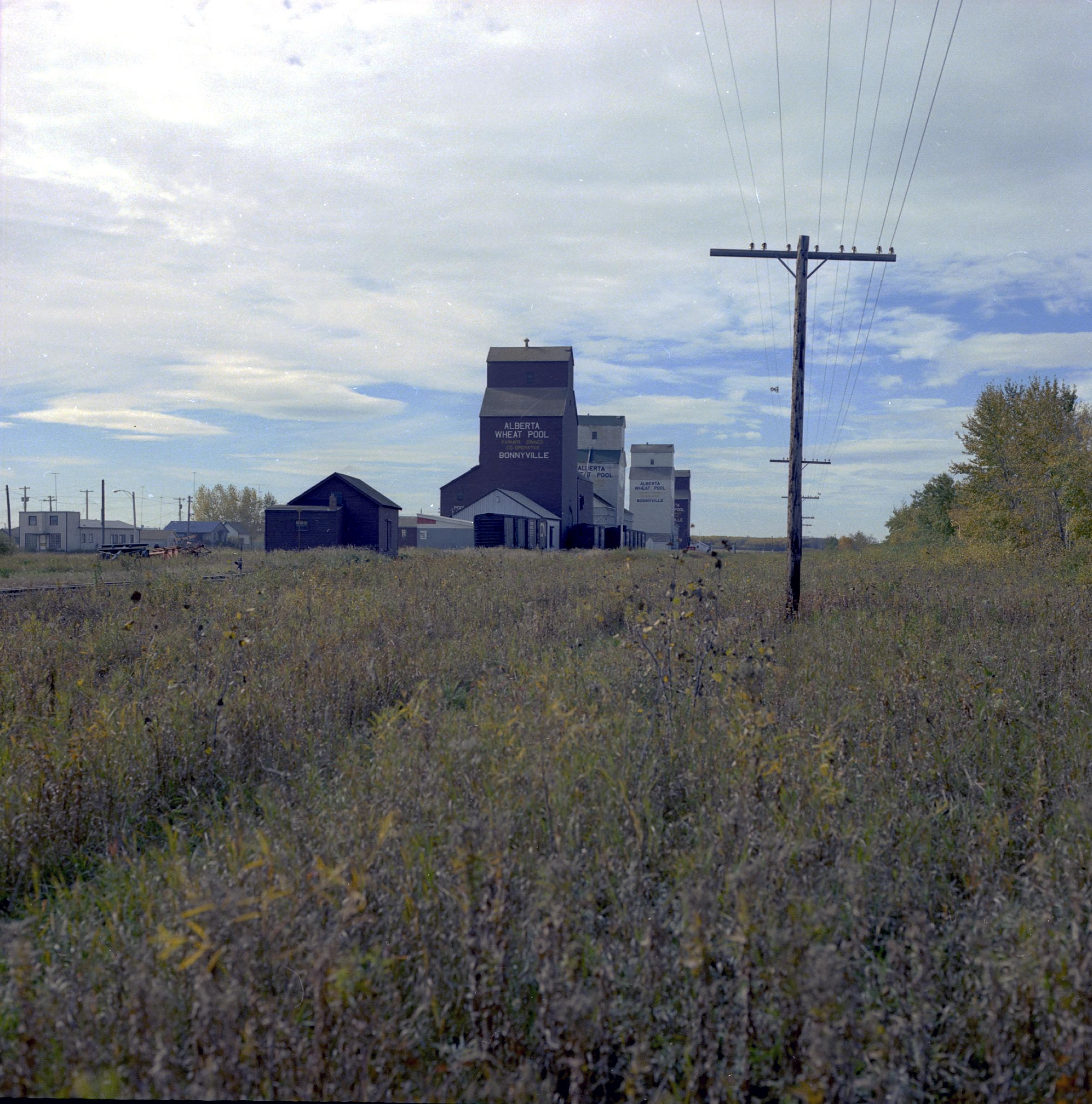
- Grain elevators, 1974

- Flag
- Motto: It's Multi-Natural
- Location in the MD of Bonnyville No. 87

- Location of Bonnyville in Alberta
- Coordinates: 54°16′05″N 110°43′49″W
- Country: Canada
- Province: Alberta
- Region: Northern Alberta
- Planning region: Lower Athabasca
- Municipal district: Municipal District of Bonnyville No. 87
- Incorporated
  - Village: September 19, 1929
  - Town: February 3, 1948

Government
  - Mayor: Elisa Brosseau
  - Governing body: Bonnyville Town Council
  - MP: Shannon Stubbs (Conservative)—Lakeland
  - MLA: Scott Cyr (United Conservative Party) — Bonnyville-Cold Lake-St. Paul

Area (2021)
  - Land: 14.17 km^{2} (5.47 sq mi)
- Elevation: 564 m (1,850 ft)

Population (2021)
  - Total: 6,404
  - Density: 452.1/km^{2} (1,171/sq mi)
- Time zone: UTC−06:00 (Alberta Time)
- Forward sortation area: T9N
- Area codes: +1-780, +1-587
- Highways: Highway 28; Buffalo Trail
- Waterways: Moose Lake; Beaver River
- Website: Official website

Bonnyville is a town in northeastern Alberta, Canada, between Cold Lake and St. Paul. The Municipal District (MD) of Bonnyville No. 87 surrounds the community.

The community derives its name from Father Bonnin, a French priest. Local histories give his name as Father Francis (François) Bonny, the settlement's first resident priest.

== History ==
In October 1789 Angus Shaw, a trader for the North West Company, ascended the Beaver River and established a trading post on the northwest shore of Moose Lake (then called Lac d'Orignal). The post operated until 1792, when Shaw moved on to establish Fort George on the North Saskatchewan River near present-day Elk Point. A statue of Shaw, carved from local cedar, was unveiled outside the Bonnyville & District Museum on July 1, 1992.

Permanent settlement began in 1907, when the Oblate priests Joseph Adéodat Thérien and J. A. Ouellette, who had been recruiting French Canadian colonists in Quebec, the Maritimes and the United States for settlements at St. Paul and Thérien, encouraged a party from Beaumont to explore the Moose Lake area. The first eight settlers—Wilfrid Ouimet, Albert Dargis, Philorome Ouellette, Aimé Marcotte, Hormidas Boisvert, Joseph Mercier, Oliva Martel and Côme Ouimet—arrived at the end of May 1907 after a journey of nine days from Edmonton by way of Brosseau and St. Paul des Métis. In 1908 the settlement gained its first school, taught by Ernestine Ouimet to seven pupils, its first church and store, and a post office, opened as St-Louis de Moose Lake and later renamed Bonnyville after Father Bonny. The first framed house, built by Wilfred Généreux in 1908, survives on the museum grounds. Three waves of settlers arrived between 1907 and 1918, and the municipal district was formed in 1915 following a petition circulated by Pierre Robitaille.

In 1916 a group of French Canadian families who had joined the Presbyterian Church brought the Rev. John E. Duclos from Edmonton; the Duclos Mission he founded built a church (1920), a hospital (1917, rebuilt 1926 and 1935) and a boarding school (1928) on the west side of the settlement. The Catholic parish's Sisters of Charity of Notre-Dame d'Évron arrived in October 1919 and converted the 1913 church into St. Louis Hospital, which served until a new hospital was completed in 1929. The village received electricity and telephone service in 1923, the same year a creamery opened, and the Canadian National Railway arrived in 1928. Bonnyville was incorporated as a village on September 19, 1929, and as a town on February 3, 1948.

== Geography ==
Bonnyville is located on the north shore of Jessie Lake. The lake is an important staging area for thousands of migrating birds, and therefore attracts birdwatchers. Other nearby lakes include Moose Lake, Crane Lake and Muriel Lake.

== Demographics ==
Federal census population history
Year	Pop.	±%
1991	5,132	—
1996	5,100	−0.6%
2001	5,709	+11.9%
2006	5,832	+2.2%
2011	6,216	+6.6%
2016	5,975	−3.9%
2021	6,404	+7.2%
Source: Statistics Canada

In the 2021 Census of Population conducted by Statistics Canada, the Town of Bonnyville had a population of 6,404 living in 2,537 of its 2,986 total private dwellings, a change of 7.2% from its 2016 population of 5,975. With a land area of 14.17 km^{2} (5.47 sq mi), it had a population density of 451.9/km^{2} (1,170.5/sq mi) in 2021.

The population of the Town of Bonnyville according to its 2017 municipal census is 6,422, a change of −7.2% from its 2014 municipal census population of 6,921.

In the 2016 Census of Population conducted by Statistics Canada, the Town of Bonnyville recorded a population of 5,975 living in 2,281 of its 2,706 total private dwellings, a −3.9% change from its 2011 population of 6,216. With a land area of 14.18 km^{2} (5.47 sq mi), it had a population density of 421.4/km^{2} (1,091.3/sq mi) in 2016.

=== Population controversy ===
The determination of the Town of Bonnyville's population has been subject to controversy since 2006. Statistics Canada's February 2017 release of the population and dwelling counts from the 2016 census reported an overall population of 5,417, which was 1,504 residents fewer than 6,921 permanent residents the municipality counted in its own census conducted in 2014, and 799 less than the 6,216 counted in Statistics Canada's 2011 census. The population count as initially reported by Statistics Canada resulted in a change of -12.9%, which gave Bonnyville the distinction of being the municipality in Canada, among those with at least 5,000 inhabitants, that experienced the greatest percentage loss in population between 2011 and 2016. The Town of Bonnyville disputed the 2016 census results and conducted its own census in 2017 that counted a population of 6,422, which was 1,005 higher than the 2016 population published by Statistics Canada and 499 less than what the town had counted in 2014. Later in 2017, Statistics Canada issued a revised 2016 population count of 5,975 for Bonnyville, 558 higher than the originally reported population of 5,417.

=== Language ===
Although English is the dominant language in Bonnyville, it is home to a notable Franco-Albertan minority. Its most common non-official mother tongues are Tagalog and Ukrainian.

Mother tongue, 2016 census	Number of speakers	Percentage
English	4,390	81.1%
French	335	6.2%
Tagalog	140	2.6%
Ukrainian	60	1.1%
Other	370	6.8%
Multiple responses	120	2.2%
Total responses	5,415	100.0%

=== Visible minorities and Aboriginals ===
Visible minority and Aboriginal population (Canada 2016 Census)
Population group		Population	% of total population
White		4,155	76.8%
Visible minority group	South Asian	35	0.6%
Visible minority group	Chinese	2	0%
Visible minority group	Black	30	0.6%
Visible minority group	Filipino	255	4.7%
Visible minority group	Latin American	25	0.5%
Visible minority group	Arab	110	2%
Visible minority group	Southeast Asian	0	0%
Visible minority group	West Asian	0	0%
Visible minority group	Korean	0	0%
Visible minority group	Japanese	10	0.2%
Visible minority group	Visible minority, n.i.e.	0	0%
Visible minority group	Multiple visible minority	15	0.3%
Total visible minority population		545	10.1%
Aboriginal group	First Nations	270	5%
Aboriginal group	Métis	440	8.1%
Aboriginal group	Inuit	0	0%
Aboriginal group	Aboriginal, n.i.e.	15	0.3%
Aboriginal group	Multiple Aboriginal identity	0	0%
Total Aboriginal population		710	13.1%
Total population		5,410	100%

== Economy ==
Bonnyville's economy is founded on its nearby petroleum reserves as well as its agricultural sector which consists mostly of grain farming and livestock.

As Bonnyville sits on the edge of the Athabasca and Cold Lake Tar Sands, among Canada's largest crude oil reserves, petrol companies like Imperial Oil and Canadian Natural Resources Limited have invested significantly to tap resources in the area.

Besides the aforementioned agricultural sectors, the municipality has seen increases in game farming, as well as specialty crop output. It is also home to one of the largest tree nurseries in Alberta, the Bonnyville Tree Nursery, with an area of around 52000 square feet dedicated to its operation.

Its location between the markets of St. Paul and Cold Lake drives much of its commercial activity, especially due to the latter's air force base.

== Attractions ==
The Bonnyville & District Museum, operated by the Bonnyville and District Historical Society (incorporated 1980), opened on May 18, 1991, and preserves several historic buildings, including the 1908 Généreux–Croteau house.

In celebration of Bonnyville's centennial year (2007), the town constructed the Centennial Centre, an educational and recreational centre, as an extension of the R. J. Lalonde Arena and the Bonnyville & District Agriplex. Its construction was somewhat controversial as its cost exceeded the original estimate and required a tax hike for both residents of the town and the municipal district.

== Sports ==
Bonnyville is home to the Bonnyville Pontiacs, a junior hockey team playing in the Alberta Junior Hockey League and also a senior hockey team, The Bonnyville Senior Pontiacs. Both play out of the R. J. Lalonde Arena, which is part of the Bonnyville & District Centennial Centre.

== Government ==
MLAs representing Bonnyville
Assembly	Years	Member	Party
Part of St. Paul
6th	1926–1930	Laudas Joly	United Farmers
7th	1930–1935	Joseph Dechene	Liberal
8th	1935–1940	Joseph Beaudry	Social Credit
9th	1940–1944	Joseph Beaudry	Social Credit
10th	1944–1948	Joseph Beaudry	Social Credit
11th	1948–1952	Joseph Beaudry	Social Credit
Part of Bonnyville
12th	1952–1955	Laudas Joly	Social Credit
13th	1955–1959	Jake Josvanger	Liberal
14th	1959–1961	Karl Nordstrom	Social Credit
14th	1961	Vacant	
14th	1961–1963	Romeo; Lamothe	Social Credit
15th	1963–1967	Romeo; Lamothe	Social Credit
16th	1967–1971	Romeo; Lamothe	Social Credit
17th	1971–1975	Donald Hansen	Progressive; Conservative
18th	1975–1979	Donald Hansen	Progressive; Conservative
19th	1979–1982	Ernie Isley	Progressive; Conservative
20th	1982–1986	Ernie Isley	Progressive; Conservative
21st	1986–1989	Ernie Isley	Progressive; Conservative
22nd	1989–1993	Ernie Isley	Progressive; Conservative
23rd	1993–1997	Leo Vasseur	Liberal
Part of Bonnyville-Cold Lake
24th	1997–2001	Denis Ducharme	Progressive; Conservative
25th	2001–2004	Denis Ducharme	Progressive; Conservative
26th	2004–2008	Denis Ducharme	Progressive; Conservative
27th	2008–2012	Genia Leskiw	Progressive; Conservative
28th	2012–2015	Genia Leskiw	Progressive; Conservative
29th	2015–2017	Scott Cyr	Wildrose
29th	2017–2019	Scott Cyr	United Conservative
Part of Bonnyville-Cold Lake-St. Paul
30th	2019–2023	Scott Cyr	United Conservative
31st	2023–	Scott Cyr	United Conservative

Bonnyville Town Council is composed of a mayor and six councilors, all directly elected at large. The current mayor, as of the 2021 election, is Elisa Brosseau. The offices of the Municipal District of Bonnyville are located within the town.

Bonnyville is located within the Bonnyville-Cold Lake-St. Paul provincial electoral district, created in 2019 from the former Bonnyville-Cold Lake district. The current MLA is Scott Cyr of the United Conservative Party, first elected in 2015 as a Wildrose member and re-elected in 2019 and 2023. Previous MLAs include Genia Leskiw and Denis Ducharme.

Federally, Bonnyville falls within the electoral district of Lakeland, re-created in 2015 and held since then by Shannon Stubbs of the Conservative Party.

== Education ==
Lakeland Catholic School District No. 150 and Northern Lights School Division No. 69 operate public schools within Bonnyville.

Lakeland Catholic School District No. 150

- École Notre Dame Elementary School (offering kindergarten through grade 4 English and French programming)
- École Dr. Bernard Brosseau School (offering grade 5 through grade 8 English and French programming)
- École Notre Dame High School (offering grade 9 through grade 12 programming)

Northern Lights School Division No. 69

- Duclos School (offering kindergarten through grade 4 programming)
- H.E. Bourgoin School (offering grade 5 through grade 8 programming)
- Bonnyville Centralized High School (offering grade 9 through grade 12 programming)
- Bonnyville Outreach School (offering grade 9 through grade 12 programming)

Conseil scolaire Centre-Est

- École des Beaux-Lacs (French school offering kindergarten through grade 12 programming)

== Media ==
- Bonnyville is served by CKSA-TV-2 (VHF channel 9), a rebroadcaster of Citytv affiliate CKSA-DT in Lloydminster.
- Bonnyville is home to 2 FM radio stations, Hot 101.3 FM (CJEG-FM), owned by Stingray Digital with a CHR/Top 40 format, and Country 99 (CFNA-FM) at 99.7 with a Country format, owned by Vista Radio.
- Bonnyville is served by two local newspapers: the Bonnyville Nouvelle, which recently became a regional paper under the name of Lakeland This Week, features news from Bonnyville, St. Paul, Cold Lake, Lac La Biche, and Elk Point. Respect, launched in 2018, is a locally owned regional newspaper "for seniors (and seniors-to-be)."

== Notable people ==
- Théodore Arcand, diplomat
- Tanner Boser, mixed martial artist
- Denis Ducharme, former provincial politician
- Tyler Ennis, former professional hockey player
- Justin Fontaine, professional hockey player
- Ernie Isley, former provincial politician and mayor
- Jon Kalinski, professional hockey player
- Eugenia "Genia" Leskiw, Canadian politician, Progressive Conservative (MLA, 2008–2015)
- Mike Plume, country music singer and songwriter

== See also ==
- List of communities in Alberta
- List of francophone communities in Alberta
- List of towns in Alberta
