= Moose Lake =

Moose Lake may refer to:

== Communities ==
- Moose Lake, Manitoba, Canada
- Moose Lake, Minnesota, United States
- Moose Lake Township, Minnesota (disambiguation)

== Lakes ==
=== Canada ===
- Moose Lake (Alberta)
- Moose Lake (British Columbia)
- Moose Lake (Manitoba), the largest of these lakes
- Moose Lake (Atikokan), Ontario
- Moose Lake (Redditt Township, Kenora District), Ontario
- Moose Lake (Laurier Township, Parry Sound District), Ontario
- Moose Lake (Sables-Spanish Rivers), Ontario
- Moose Lake (Timiskaming District), Ontario
- Moose Lake (Dorion), Ontario
- Moose Lake (Rain River, Kenora District), Ontario
- Moose Lake (Sayer Township, Algoma District), Ontario
- Moose Lake (Bomby Township, Thunder Bay District), Ontario
- Moose Lake (Bevin Township, Sudbury District), Ontario
- Moose Lake (Ermine Township, Algoma District), Ontario
- Moose Lake (Winnipeg River, Kenora District), Ontario
- Moose Lake (Laronde Township, Algoma District), Ontario
- Moose Lake (Vista Lake, Rainy River District), Ontario
- Moose Lake (Muskoka District), Ontario
- Moose Lake (Nagagami Township, Algoma District), Ontario
- Moose Lake (Moose Creek, Kenora District), Ontario
- Moose Lake (Ivanhoe Township, Sudbury District), Ontario
- Moose Lake (Wallbridge Township, Parry Sound District), Ontario
- Moose Lake (Nipissing District), Ontario
- Moose Lake (Cochrane District), Ontario
- Moose Lake (Haliburton County), Ontario
- Moose Lake (Robbins Township, Thunder Bay District), Ontario
- Moose Lake (The Archipelago), Ontario
- Moose Lake (Mameigwess River, Kenora District), Ontario
- Moose Lake (Killarney), Ontario
- Moose Lake (Hall Township, Sudbury District), Ontario
- Moose Lake (Dart Lake, Thunder Bay District), Ontario
- Moose Lake (Norman Township, Greater Sudbury), Ontario
- Moose Lake (Capreol Township, Greater Sudbury), Ontario
- Moose Lake (Levack Township, Greater Sudbury), Ontario
- Moose Lake (Renfrew County), Ontario
- Moose Lake (Scattergood Creek, Kenora District), Ontario
- Moose Lake (Ord River, Kenora District), Ontario
- Moose Lake (MacLennan Township, Greater Sudbury), Ontario
- Moose Lake (Shuniah), Ontario

=== United States ===
- Moose Lake (Flathead County, Montana), a lake of Flathead County, Montana
- Moose Lake, a lake of Granite County, Montana
- Moose Lake (Powell County, Montana), a lake of Powell County, Montana
- Moose Lake (Lake County, Minnesota), an entry point into the Boundary Waters Canoe Area Wilderness

== Protected areas ==
- Moose Lake Provincial Park, Alberta, Canada
- Moose Lake Provincial Park (Manitoba), a park in Manitoba, Canada
- Moose Lake State Park, Minnesota

== Indian reserve ==
- Mosakahiken Cree Nation, in possession of Moose Lake 31A, 31C, 31D, 31G, and 31J Indian reserves

== See also ==
- Moosehead Lake
