= Bonnyville-Cold Lake-St. Paul =

Provincial electoral district in Alberta, Canada

Alberta electoral district
- Bonnyville-Cold Lake-St. Paul within Alberta.

Provincial electoral district
- Legislature: Legislative Assembly of Alberta
MLA
Scott Cyr
United Conservative
- District created: 2017
- First contested: 2019
- Last contested: 2023

Demographics
- Population (2016): 53,809
- Area (km²): 15,870
- Pop. density (per km²): 3.4
- Census division: 12

Bonnyville-Cold Lake-St. Paul is a current provincial electoral district in Alberta, Canada. The district is one of 87 districts mandated to return a single member (MLA) to the Legislative Assembly of Alberta using the first past the post method of voting. It was contested for the first time in the 2019 Alberta election.

== Geography ==
The district is located in northeastern Alberta, containing the communities of Cold Lake, Bonnyville, St. Paul and Elk Point, the MD of Bonnyville, most of St. Paul County, the Elizabeth and Fishing Lake Metis settlements, the Cold Lake First Nations, Kehewin First Nation, and Saddle Lake. It also includes CFB Cold Lake and the uninhabited Air Weapons Range.

== History ==
Members for Bonnyville-Cold Lake-St. Paul
Assembly	Years	Member	Party
Riding created from Bonnyville-Cold Lake, Lac La Biche-St. Paul-Two Hills and Fort McMurray-Conklin
30th	2019–2023	Dave Hanson	United Conservative
31st	2023–present	Scott Cyr	United Conservative

The district was created in 2017 when the Electoral Boundaries Commission recommended joining part of Lac La Biche-St. Paul-Two Hills to Bonnyville-Cold Lake. The Commission recommended naming the district Cold Lake-St. Paul, but the Assembly decided to retain Bonnyville in the name.

Some local officials expressed discontent with the creation of this riding, especially given that it is the most populous of the new districts. According to the 2016 census, its population is 15% above the mean. The Commission justified this variance because, in their opinion, "this is an area where future population growth is likely to fall well below the provincial average."

The district first elected United Conservative MLA Dave Hanson who had previously been elected to Lac La Biche-St. Paul-Two Hills as a Wildrose candidate in 2015. Hanson originally contested the UCP nomination against former Wildrose MLA for Bonnyville-Cold Lake Scott Cyr who would drop out prior to the constituency vote. Hanson would defeat his next closest competitor, NDP candidate and teacher Kari Whan by over 12,000 votes.

== Electoral results ==
=== Graphical summary ===
2015
22.3%	3.8	29.2%	44.0%
New Democratic	AP	Progressive Conservative	Wildrose

2019
14.0%	10.2%	73.1%
NDP	Alberta	United Conservative

2023
24.5%	75.5%
New Democratic	United Conservative

2026 Independence Referendum
58.6%	41.4%
Remain	Referendum

=== 2023 ===
2023 Alberta general election
Party	Candidate	Votes	%	±%
United Conservative	Scott Cyr	13,315	75.47	+2.38
New Democratic	Caitlyn Blake	4,327	24.53	+10.50
Total		17,642	99.48	–
Rejected and declined		92	0.52	
Turnout		17,734	51.52	
Eligible electors		34,419		
United Conservative hold		Swing		-4.06
Source(s) Source: Elections Alberta

=== 2019 ===
2019 Alberta general election
Party	Candidate	Votes	%	±%	Expenditures
United Conservative	David B. Hanson	15,943	73.09	-0.06	$38,896
New Democratic	Kari Whan	3,061	14.03	-8.20	$3,288
Alberta Party	Glenn Andersen	2,223	10.19	–	$16,235
Alberta Independence	David Garnett-Bennett	217	0.99	–	$500
Alberta Advantage Party	David Inscho	207	0.95	–	$1,580
Independent	Kacey L Daniels	162	0.74	–	$1,714
Total		21,813	99.53	–	
Rejected, spoiled and declined		102	0.47		
Turnout		21,915	66.01	–	
Eligible voters		33,199			
United Conservative notional hold		Swing		+4.07	
Source(s) Source: Elections Alberta Note: Expenses is the sum of "Election Expenses", "Other Expenses" and "Transfers Issued". The Elections Act limits "Election Expenses" to $50,000. Change is based on re-distributed results from the 2015 Alberta general election.

=== 2015 ===
Redistributed results, 2015 Alberta general election
Party	Votes	%
Wildrose	7,304	43.96
Progressive Conservative	4,849	29.19
New Democratic	3,693	22.23
Alberta Party	628 (Note: No candidate in Lac La Biche-St. Paul-Two Hills)	3.78
Green	140 (Note: No candidate in Bonnyville-Cold Lake)	0.84
Total valid votes	16,614	100.00
Source(s) Source: Ridingbuilder

== Nomination contests ==
UCP Bonnyville-Cold Lake-St. Paul nomination contest: December 10-12, 2022

Candidate	Round 1		Round 2	
Candidate	Votes	%	Votes	%
Scott Cyr	252	34.7	314	50.1
Dave Hanson	289	39.8	313	49.9
Greg Sawchuk	186	25.6	Eliminated	
Total	727	100.0	627	100.0

== See also ==
- List of Alberta provincial electoral districts
- Canadian provincial electoral districts
