= Dave Hanson (politician) =

Canadian politician,

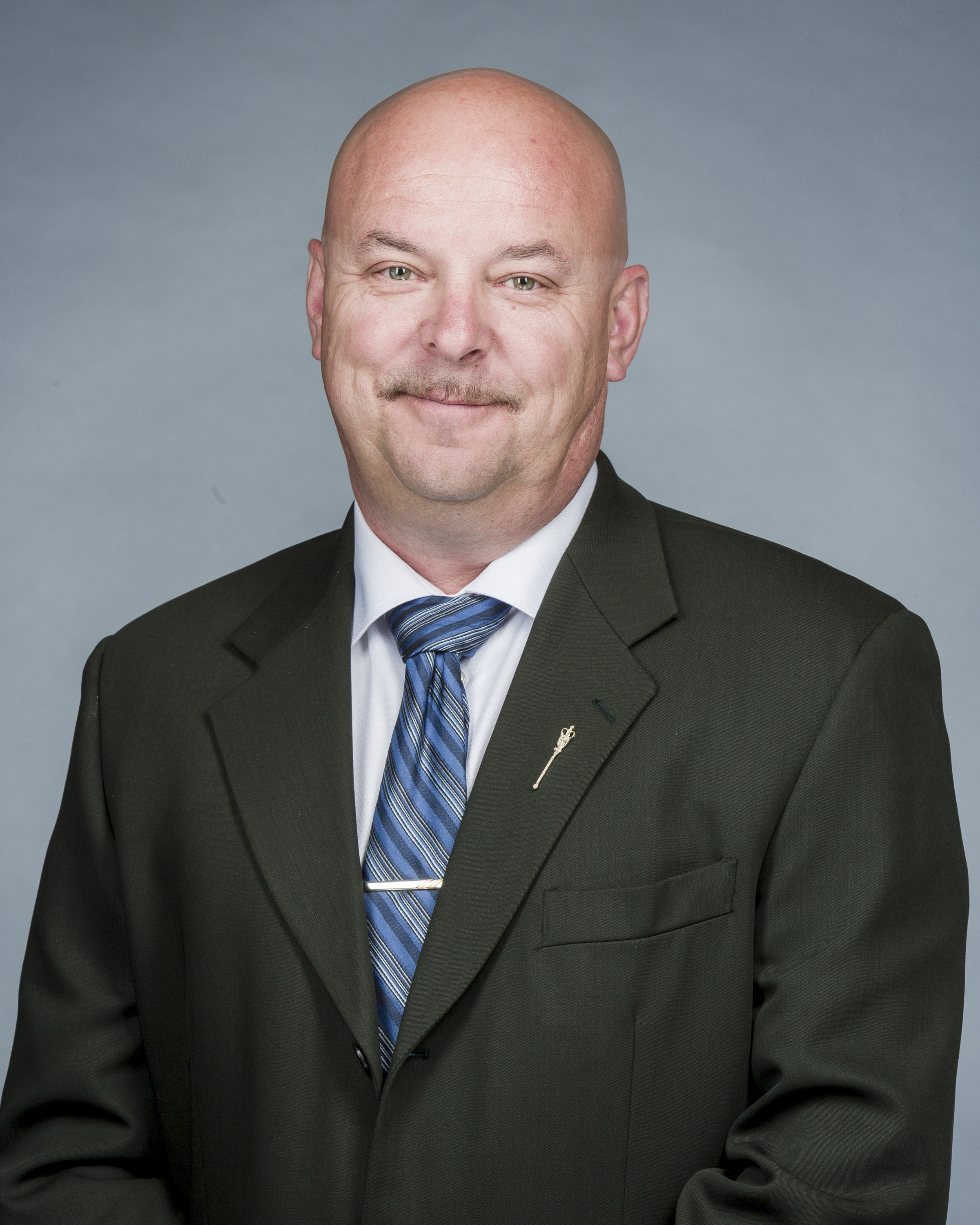

Member of the Legislative Assembly of Alberta for Bonnyville-Cold Lake-St. Paul Lac La Biche-St. Paul-Two Hills (2015–2019)
- In office May 5, 2015 – May 29, 2023
- Preceded by: Shayne Saskiw
- Succeeded by: Scott Cyr

Personal details
- Born: David Bradley Hansen; 1960 or 1961 (age 65–66) Two Hills, Alberta, Canada
- Party: United Conservative
- Other party: Wildrose (2015–17)
- Occupation: Oilfield consultant

David Bradley Hanson is a Canadian politician who was elected in the 2019 Alberta general election to represent the electoral district of Bonnyville-Cold Lake-St. Paul in the 30th Alberta Legislature. He was first elected in the 2015 election, to the 29th Alberta Legislature, for Lac La Biche-St. Paul-Two Hills, where he held the seat for the Wildrose Party after incumbent MLA Shayne Saskiw did not seek re-election.

== Background ==
Hanson was born in Two Hills, Alberta in either 1960 or 1961, where he spent his childhood. After graduating high school, Hanson attended Northern Alberta Institute of Technology (NAIT) in 1982, where he was qualified in plumbing, gasfitting, and steamfitting. He has since worked for various construction and oil companies, and lives on a farm outside St. Paul, Alberta.

Prior to being elected, he worked for Canadian Natural Resources Limited as a supervisor. He cites his desire to help the oil and gas field as being rooted in his own experience in the industry. He also references his two children working in the medical field as motivation for prioritizing health issues.

== Political career ==
Hanson served as critic for Indigenous Relations as well as Emergency Response and Disaster Preparedness for the Wildrose opposition. When the party merged with the Progressive Conservatives in 2017, he joined the new party and continued as its critic for Indigenous Relations.

== Electoral history ==
2015 Alberta general election: Lac La Biche-St. Paul-Two Hills
Party	Candidate	Votes	%	±%
Wildrose	Dave Hanson	4,760	38.65%	-7.91%
New Democratic	Catherine Harder	4,213	34.21%	+28.68%
Progressive Conservative	Darrell Younghans	3,002	24.38%	-18.02%
Green	Brian Deheer	340	2.76%	–
Total valid votes		12,315	–	–
Rejected, spoiled and declined		73	–	–
Electors/turnout		23,476	52.77%	-6.49%
Wildrose hold		Swing		-18.30%
Source(s) "Election Results - LAC LA BICHE-ST. PAUL-TWO HILLS". officialresults.elections.ab.ca. Elections Alberta.

2019 Alberta general election: Bonnyville-Cold Lake-St. Paul
Party	Candidate	Votes	%	±%	Expenditures
United Conservative	David B. Hanson	15,943	73.09	-0.06	$38,896
New Democratic	Kari Whan	3,061	14.03	-8.20	$3,288
Alberta Party	Glenn Andersen	2,223	10.19	–	$16,235
Alberta Independence	David Garnett-Bennett	217	0.99	–	$500
Alberta Advantage Party	David Inscho	207	0.95	–	$1,580
Independent	Kacey L Daniels	162	0.74	–	$1,714
Total		21,813	99.53	–	
Rejected, spoiled and declined		102	0.47		
Turnout		21,915	66.01	–	
Eligible voters		33,199			
United Conservative notional hold		Swing		+4.07	
Source(s) Source: Elections Alberta Note: Expenses is the sum of "Election Expenses", "Other Expenses" and "Transfers Issued". The Elections Act limits "Election Expenses" to $50,000. Change is based on re-distributed results from the 2015 Alberta general election.

UCP Bonnyville-Cold Lake-St. Paul nomination contest: December 10-12, 2022

Candidate	Round 1		Round 2	
Candidate	Votes	%	Votes	%
Scott Cyr	252	34.7	314	50.1
Dave Hanson	289	39.8	313	49.9
Greg Sawchuk	186	25.6	Eliminated	
Total	727	100.0	627	100.0
