= Bonnyville (provincial electoral district) =

Defunct provincial electoral district in Alberta, Canada

Coordinates: 54.254°N 110.524°W

Alberta electoral district

Defunct provincial electoral district
- Legislature: Legislative Assembly of Alberta
- District created: 1913
- District abolished: 1952
- First contested: 1913
- Last contested: 1948

Bonnyville was a provincial electoral district in Alberta, Canada, mandated to return a single member to the Legislative Assembly of Alberta from 1952 to 1997. The Bonnyville electoral district was created in 1952 from the northern part of the St. Paul electoral district. In 1997 the riding was renamed Bonnyville-Cold Lake, to more accurately reflect the two largest population centres in the constituency.

== Representation history ==
Members of the Legislative Assembly for Bonnyville
| Assembly | Years | Member | Party | Status |
|---|---|---|---|---|
See St. Paul 1913-1952
| 12th | 1952–1955 | Laudas Joly | Social Credit | Backbench |
| 13th | 1955–1959 | Jake Josvanger | Liberal | Opposition |
| 14th | 1959–1961 | Karl Nordstrom | Social Credit | Backbench |
| 14th | 1961 | Vacant | | |
| 14th | 1961–1963 | Romeo; Lamothe | Social Credit | Backbench |
| 15th | 1963–1967 | Romeo; Lamothe | Social Credit | Backbench |
| 16th | 1967–1971 | Romeo; Lamothe | Social Credit | Backbench |
| 17th | 1971–1975 | Donald Hansen | Progressive; Conservative | Backbench |
| 18th | 1975–1979 | Donald Hansen | Progressive; Conservative | Backbench |
| 19th | 1979–1982 | Ernie Isley | Progressive; Conservative | Backbench |
| 20th | 1982–1986 | Ernie Isley | Progressive; Conservative | Cabinet |
| 21st | 1986–1989 | Ernie Isley | Progressive; Conservative | Cabinet |
| 22nd | 1989–1993 | Ernie Isley | Progressive; Conservative | Cabinet |
| 23rd | 1993–1997 | Leo Vasseur | Liberal | Opposition |
See Bonnyville-Cold Lake 1997-2019

The new district was won by former United Farmers MLA for St. Paul, Laudas Joly, running as a Social Credit candidate. Upon his retirement in 1955, the riding would be won by Jake Josvanger, as part of the Liberal Party's brief revival under James Harper Prowse.

Social Credit would re-take Bonnyville in 1959, but new MLA Karl Nordstrom died in office in 1961, triggering a by-election later that year. Social Credit candidate Romeo Lamothe would retain the seat, and go on to serve two full terms after that.

In Peter Lougheed's 1971 victory for the Progressive Conservatives, candidate Donald Hansen would capture Bonnyville for the new government, and serve two terms as MLA. Upon his retirement in 1979, Ernie Isley would retain the seat for the PCs and serve four terms as MLA, holding several cabinet positions under Lougheed and Don Getty.

When Ralph Klein became premier in 1992, Isley remained minister of Agriculture, but then lost his seat in the 1993 election to Liberal Leo Vasseur.

The riding was then replaced by Bonnyville-Cold Lake for the 1997 election, in which PC candidate Denis Ducharme would defeat Vasseur and re-gain the seat.

== Election results ==
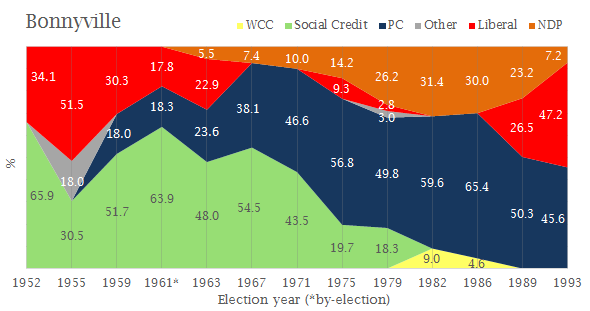
Graphical summary of results

=== 1950s ===
The 1952 and 1955 elections were done by instant-runoff voting, although a second round was not needed in the district for either.

1952 Alberta general election
| Party | Candidate | Votes | % |
|---|---|---|---|
| Social Credit | Laudas Joly | 2,497 | 65.94% |
| Liberal | Irvin J. Baril | 1,290 | 34.06% |
| Total valid votes | | 3,787 | |
| Rejected, spoiled and declined | | 215 | |
| Eligible electors / turnout | | 5,935 | 67.43% |
| Social Credit pickup new district. | | | |

1955 Alberta general election
| Party | Candidate | Votes | % | ±% |
|---|---|---|---|---|
| Liberal | Jake Josvanger | 2,250 | 51.50% | +17.44% |
| Social Credit | Alfred A. Muller | 1,331 | 30.46% | -35.48% |
| Independent | L.F. Krawchuk | 788 | 18.04% | |
| Total valid votes | | 4,369 | | |
| Rejected, spoiled and declined | | 384 | | |
| Eligible electors / turnout | | 6,393 | 74.35% | +6.92% |
| Liberal gain from Social Credit | | Swing | | +26.46% |

Alberta switched back to traditional first past the post elections in 1959, which can be seen in the dramatic drop in spoiled (incorrectly marked) ballots compared to previous elections.

1959 Alberta general election
| Party | Candidate | Votes | % | ±% |
|---|---|---|---|---|
| Social Credit | Karl Nordstrom | 2,465 | 51.66% | +21.20% |
| Liberal | Jake Josvanger | 1,447 | 30.32% | -21.18% |
| Progressive Conservative | Victor Justik | 860 | 18.02% | |
| Total valid votes | | 4,772 | | |
| Rejected, spoiled and declined | | 14 | | |
| Eligible electors / turnout | | 8,108 | 59.03% | -15.32% |
| Social Credit gain from Liberal | | Swing | | +21.19% |

=== 1960s ===
Alberta provincial by-election, November 27, 1961 upon the death of Karl Nordstrom
| Party | Candidate | Votes | % | ±% |
|---|---|---|---|---|
| Social Credit | Romeo Lamothe | 2,401 | 63.86% | +12.20% |
| Progressive Conservative | Victor Justik | 689 | 18.32% | +0.30% |
| Liberal | C.K. Josvanger | 670 | 17.82% | -12.50% |
| Total valid votes | | 3,760 | | |
| Rejected, spoiled and declined | | - | | |
| Eligible electors / turnout | | - | - | |
| Social Credit hold | | Swing | | +6.25% |

1963 Alberta general election
| Party | Candidate | Votes | % | ±% |
|---|---|---|---|---|
| Social Credit | Romeo Lamothe | 2,222 | 48.02% | -15.84% |
| Progressive Conservative | Victor Justik | 1,091 | 23.58% | +5.26% |
| Liberal | Albert Turcotte | 1,059 | 22.89% | +5.07% |
| New Democratic | Peter Forman | 255 | 5.51% | |
| Total valid votes | | 4,627 | | |
| Rejected, spoiled and declined | | 11 | | |
| Eligible electors / turnout | | 8,267 | 59.10% | |
| Social Credit hold | | Swing | | -5.29% |

1967 Alberta general election
| Party | Candidate | Votes | % | ±% |
|---|---|---|---|---|
| Social Credit | Romeo Lamothe | 2,339 | 54.51% | +6.49% |
| Progressive Conservative | Victor Justik | 1,636 | 38.13% | +14.55% |
| New Democratic | Kenneth Kerr | 316 | 7.36% | +1.85% |
| Total valid votes | | 4,291 | | |
| Rejected, spoiled and declined | | 31 | | |
| Eligible electors / turnout | | 8,599 | 50.26% | -8.84% |
| Social Credit hold | | Swing | | -4.03% |

=== 1970s ===
1971 Alberta general election
| Party | Candidate | Votes | % | ±% |
|---|---|---|---|---|
| Progressive Conservative | Donald Hansen | 2,523 | 46.58% | +8.45% |
| Social Credit | Lorne Mowers | 2,355 | 43.47% | -11.04% |
| New Democratic | Claire Gaines | 539 | 9.95% | +2.59% |
| Total valid votes | | 5,417 | | |
| Rejected, spoiled and declined | | 21 | | |
| Eligible electors / turnout | | 9,234 | 58.89% | +8.63% |
| Progressive Conservative gain from Social Credit | | Swing | | +9.75% |

1975 Alberta general election
| Party | Candidate | Votes | % | ±% |
|---|---|---|---|---|
| Progressive Conservative | Donald Hansen | 3,226 | 56.84% | +10.26% |
| Social Credit | George Nordstrom | 1,119 | 19.71% | -23.76% |
| New Democratic | Franklin Foster | 805 | 14.18% | +4.23% |
| Liberal | Ron Pernarowski | 526 | 9.27% | |
| Total valid votes | | 5,676 | | |
| Rejected, spoiled and declined | | 18 | | |
| Eligible electors / turnout | | 9,451 | 60.25% | +1.36% |
| Progressive Conservative hold | | Swing | | +17.01% |

1979 Alberta general election
| Party | Candidate | Votes | % | ±% |
|---|---|---|---|---|
| Progressive Conservative | Ernie Isley | 3,468 | 49.75% | -7.09% |
| New Democratic | Tom Turner | 1,828 | 26.22% | +12.04% |
| Social Credit | George Nordstrom | 1,275 | 18.29% | -1.42% |
| Independent | Donald Appleby | 206 | 2.96% | |
| Liberal | Edward Stepanik | 194 | 2.78% | -6.49% |
| Total valid votes | | 6,971 | | |
| Rejected, spoiled and declined | | 25 | | |
| Eligible electors / turnout | | 11,053 | 63.30% | +3.05% |
| Progressive Conservative hold | | Swing | | -9.57% |

=== 1980s ===
1982 Alberta general election
| Party | Candidate | Votes | % | ±% |
|---|---|---|---|---|
| Progressive Conservative | Ernie Isley | 4,842 | 59.62% | +9.87% |
| New Democratic | Tom Turner | 2,547 | 31.36% | +5.14% |
| Western Canada Concept | Eric E. Enns | 732 | 9.02% | |
| Total valid votes | | 8,121 | | |
| Rejected, spoiled and declined | | 13 | | |
| Eligible electors / turnout | | 12,343 | 66.01% | +2.71% |
| Progressive Conservative hold | | Swing | | +2.37% |

1986 Alberta general election
| Party | Candidate | Votes | % | ±% |
|---|---|---|---|---|
| Progressive Conservative | Ernie Isley | 3,630 | 65.42% | +5.80% |
| New Democratic | Thomas J. Tucker | 1,663 | 29.97% | -1.39% |
| Western Canada Concept | Vern McCaig | 256 | 4.61% | -4.41% |
| Total valid votes | | 5,549 | | |
| Rejected, spoiled and declined | | 15 | | |
| Eligible electors / turnout | | 15,258 | 36.47% | -29.54% |
| Progressive Conservative hold | | Swing | | +3.60% |

1989 Alberta general election
| Party | Candidate | Votes | % | ±% |
|---|---|---|---|---|
| Progressive Conservative | Ernie Isley | 3,362 | 50.30% | -15.12% |
| Liberal | Denis Lapierre | 1,769 | 26.47% | |
| New Democratic | Lori Hall | 1,553 | 23.23% | -6.74% |
| Total valid votes | | 6,684 | | |
| Rejected, spoiled and declined | | 13 | | |
| Eligible electors / turnout | | 15,127 | 44.27% | +7.80% |
| Progressive Conservative hold | | Swing | | -20.80% |

=== 1993 election ===
1993 Alberta general election
| Party | Candidate | Votes | % | ±% |
|---|---|---|---|---|
| Liberal | Leo Vasseur | 4,364 | 47.2% | +20.7% |
| Progressive Conservative | Ernie Isley | 4,222 | 45.6% | -4.7% |
| New Democratic | Agathe Gaulin | 666 | 7.2% | -16.0% |
| Total valid votes | | 9,252 | | |
| Rejected, spoiled and declined | | 39 | | |
| Eligible electors / turnout | | 16,826 | 55.2% | +10.9% |
| Liberal gain from Progressive Conservative | | Swing | | +12.7% |

== Plebiscite results ==
=== 1957 liquor plebiscite ===
1957 Alberta liquor plebiscite results: Bonnyville
Question A: Do you approve additional types of outlets for the sale of beer, wine and spirituous liquor subject to a local vote?
| Ballot choice | Votes | % |
|---|---|---|
| Yes | 1,716 | 66.05% |
| No | 882 | 33.95% |
| Total votes | 2,598 | 100% |
| Rejected, spoiled and declined | 31 | |
6,988 eligible electors, turnout 37.62%

On October 30, 1957, a stand-alone plebiscite was held province wide in all 50 of the then current provincial electoral districts in Alberta. The government decided to consult Alberta voters to decide on liquor sales and mixed drinking after a divisive debate in the legislature. The plebiscite was intended to deal with the growing demand for reforming antiquated liquor control laws.

The plebiscite was conducted in two parts. Question A, asked in all districts, asked the voters if the sale of liquor should be expanded in Alberta, while Question B, asked in a handful of districts within the corporate limits of Calgary and Edmonton, asked if men and women should be allowed to drink together in establishments.

Province wide Question A of the plebiscite passed in 33 of the 50 districts while Question B passed in all five districts. Bonnyville voted in favour of the proposal by an overwhelming majority. The district recorded a poor voter turnout, falling well below the province wide average of 46%.

Official district returns were released to the public on December 31, 1957. The Social Credit government in power at the time did not consider the results binding. However the results of the vote led the government to repeal all existing liquor legislation and introduce an entirely new Liquor Act.

Municipal districts lying inside electoral districts that voted against the plebiscite were designated Local Option Zones by the Alberta Liquor Control Board and considered effective dry zones. Business owners who wanted a licence had to petition for a binding municipal plebiscite in order to be granted a licence.

== See also ==
- List of Alberta provincial electoral districts
- Canadian provincial electoral districts
- Bonnyville, a town in east-central Alberta
