= Bonnyville-Cold Lake =

Defunct provincial electoral district in Alberta, Canada

Coordinates: 54.029°N 110.458°W

Alberta electoral district
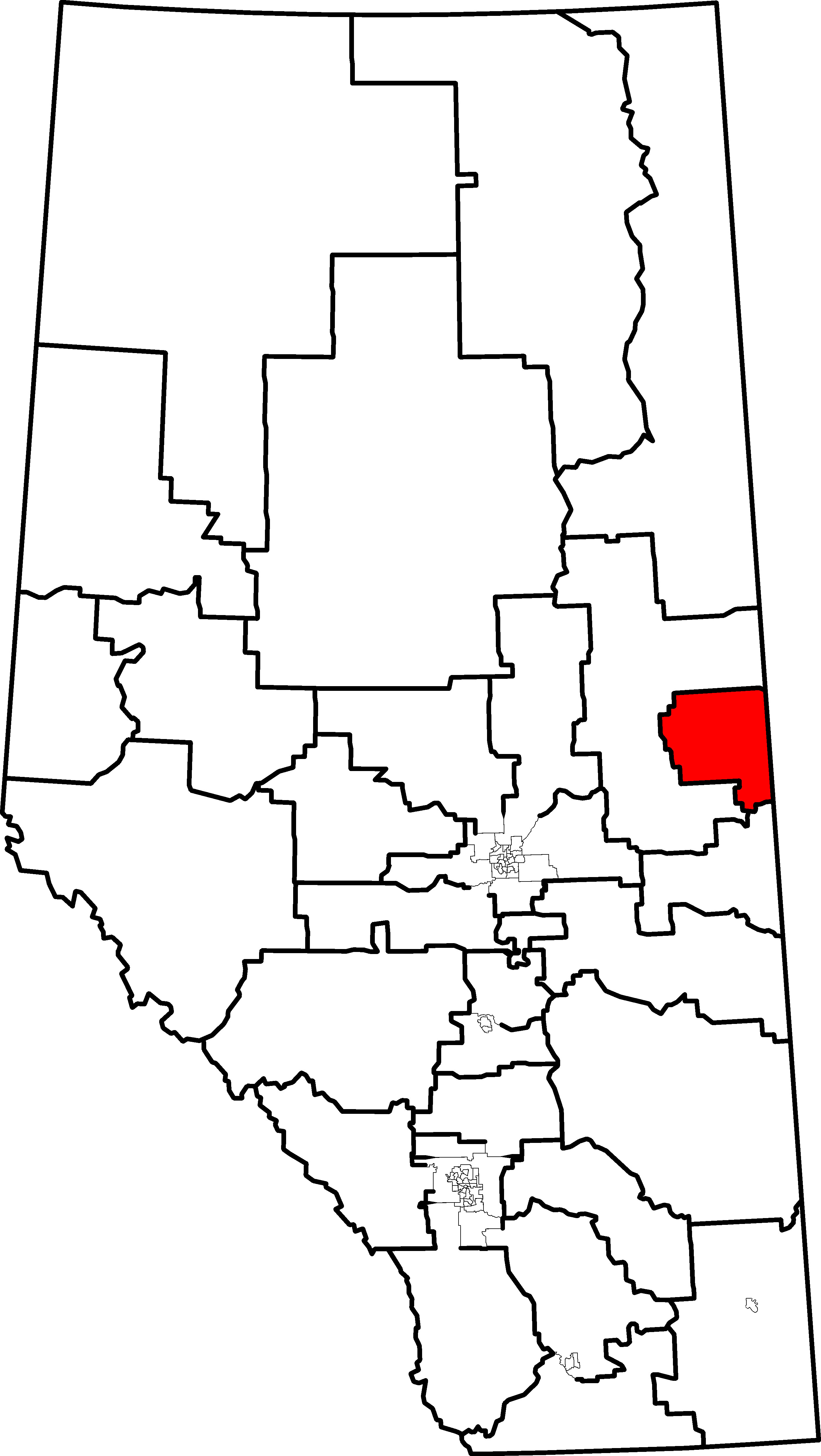
- 2010 boundaries

Defunct provincial electoral district
- Legislature: Legislative Assembly of Alberta
- District created: 1997
- District abolished: 2019
- First contested: 1997
- Last contested: 2015

Bonnyville-Cold Lake was a provincial electoral district in Alberta, Canada, mandated to return a single member to the Legislative Assembly of Alberta using the first past the post method of voting from 1997 to 2019.

== Geography ==
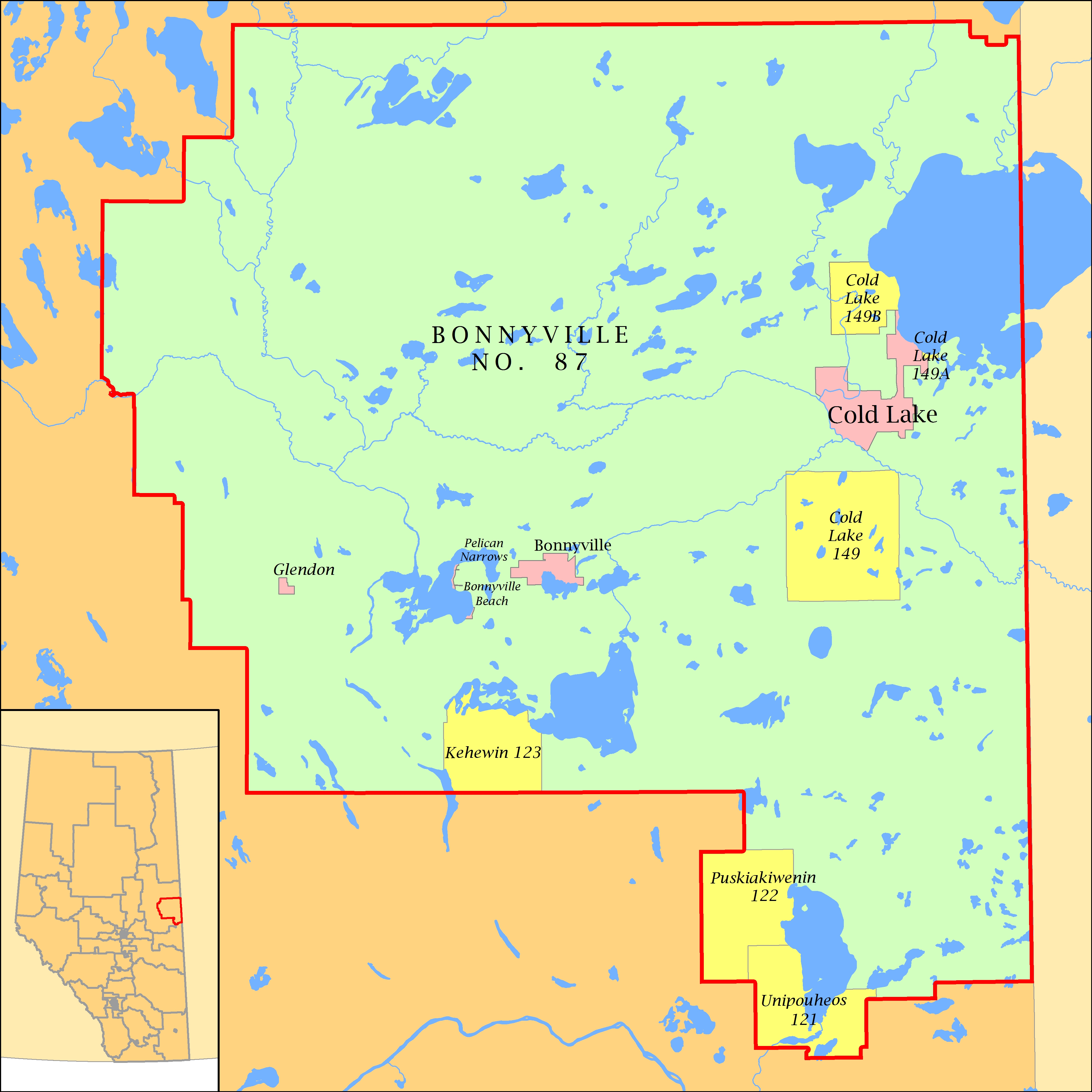
Municipalities within Bonnyville-Cold Lake, 2017

Bonnyville-Cold Lake is primarily rural electoral district is found in northeastern Alberta along the Saskatchewan border. The riding was coterminous with the Municipal District of Bonnyville No. 87, and also contains the following municipalities:

- The City of Cold Lake (including CFB Cold Lake)
- The Town of Bonnyville
- The Village of Glendon
- The summer villages of Bonnyville Beach and Pelican Narrows
- The Kehewin First Nation, the Cold Lake First Nations (in three reserves), and the Frog Lake First Nation (in two reserves: Unipouheos and Puskiakiwenin)
- The Elizabeth and Fishing Lake Métis Settlements in the southeast of the riding (not pictured on map).

The district bordered Lac La Biche-St. Paul-Two Hills to the north, west and southwest, and Vermilion-Lloydminster to the southeast.

== History ==
The district was created in the 1997 Boundary redistribution from the electoral district of Bonnyville, retaining the same boundaries as the old district. The riding had been held from its creation until 2015 by the Progressive Conservatives, although the Liberals held the antecedent riding from 1993 to 1997.

The 2004 Alberta electoral re-distribution saw the riding lose some uninhabited territory in its north, part of the Cold Lake Air Weapons Range, to Lac La Biche-St. Paul-Two Hills. This gave Bonnyville-Cold Lake the same boundaries as the Municipal District.

In the 2010 electoral boundary re-distribution the riding remained unchanged with no boundary alterations from the 2003 boundaries.

The Bonnyville-Cold Lake electoral district was dissolved in the 2017 electoral boundary re-distribution, and would be renamed Bonnyville-Cold Lake-St. Paul electoral district for the 2019 Alberta general election.

=== Boundary history ===
48 Bonnyville-Cold Lake 2003 boundaries
Bordering districts
North	East	West	South
Lac La Biche-St. Paul	Saskatchewan border	Lac La Biche-St. Paul	Lac La Biche-St. Paul, Vermilion-Lloydminster
riding map goes here			
Legal description from Electoral Divisions Act, S.A. 2003, c. E-4.1
Starting at the east boundary of Sec. 35, Twp. 66, Rge. 9 W4 and the south boundary of the Cold Lake Air Weapons Range (CLAWR); then 1. east along the south boundary of CLAWR to the east boundary of the Province; 2. south along the east boundary of the Province to the south boundary of Fishing Lake Métis Settlement; 3. west and south along the Métis Settlement boundary to the east boundary of Unipouheous Indian Reserve No. 121; 4. south, west and north along Indian Reserve No. 121 to the south boundary of Puskiakiwenin Indian Reserve No. 122; 5. west, north and east along the boundary of Indian Reserve No. 122 to the east boundary of Rge. 4 W4; 6. north along the east boundary of Rge. 4 W4 to the north boundary of Twp. 58; 7. west along the north boundary of Twp. 58 to the east boundary of Kehewin Indian Reserve No. 123; 8. south, west and north along the Indian Reserve boundary to the north boundary of Twp. 58; 9. west along the north boundary to the east boundary of the west half of Sec. 1 in Twp. 59, Rge. 9 W4; 10. north along the east boundary of the west half of Secs. 1, 12, 13, 24, 25 and 36 in the Twp. and the east boundary of the west half of Secs. 1, 12 and 13 in Twp. 60, Rge. 9 W4 to the north boundary of Sec. 13 in the Twp.; 11. west along the north boundary of Secs. 13, 14, 15 and 16 to the east boundary of Sec. 20 in the Twp.; 12. north along the east boundary of Secs. 20, 29 and 32 in the Twp. to the north boundary of Twp. 60; 13. west along the north boundary to the east boundary of the west half of Sec. 5 in Twp. 61, Rge. 9 W4; 14. north along the east boundary of the west half of Secs. 5, 8, 17, 20, 29 and 32 in the Twp. to the north boundary of Twp. 61; 15. west along the north boundary to the east boundary of Sec. 6 in Twp. 62, Rge. 9 W4; 16. north along the east boundary to the north boundary of the south half of Sec. 16; 17. west along the north boundary of the south half of Sec. 6 in the Twp. and Secs. 1 and 2 in Twp. 62, Rge. 10 W4 to the east boundary of the west half of Sec. 2 in the Twp.; 18. north along the east boundary of the west half of Secs. 2, 11, 14, 23, 26 and 35 in the Twp. and the east boundary of Sec. 2 in Twp. 63 to the intersection with the Beaver River; 19. upstream along the right bank of the Beaver River to the east boundary of Sec. 9 in Twp. 63, Rge. 10 W4; 20. north along the east boundary of Secs. 9, 16, 21, 28 and 33 in the Twp. and the east boundary of Secs. 4, 9, 16, 21, 28 and 33 in Twp. 64, Rge. 10 W4 and the east boundary of Sec. 4 in Twp. 65 to the north boundary of Sec. 3 in Twp. 65, Rge. 10 W4; 21. east along the north boundary of Secs. 3, 2 and 1 in the Twp. and the north boundary of Secs. 6 and 5 in Rge. 9 to the east boundary of Sec. 8, Twp. 65, Rge. 9 W4; 22. north along the east boundary of Secs. 8, 17, 20 and 29 to the north boundary of Sec. 28 in the Twp.; 23. east along the north boundary of Secs. 28, 27 and 26 to the east boundary of Sec. 35 in the Twp.; 24. north along the east boundary of Sec. 35 in the Twp. and Secs. 2, 11, 14, 23, 26 and 35 in Twp. 66, Rge. 9 W4 to the starting point.
Note:

52 Bonnyville-Cold Lake 2010 boundaries
Bordering districts
North	East	West	South
Lac La Biche-St. Paul-Two Hills		Saskatchewan border	Vermilion-Lloydminster
Note: No changes were made to the riding in the 2010 Boundary Redistribution

=== Representation history ===
Members of the Legislative Assembly for Bonnyville-Cold Lake
Assembly	Years	Member	Party
See Bonnyville 1952-1997
24th	1997–2001	Denis Ducharme	Progressive; Conservative
25th	2001–2004	Denis Ducharme	Progressive; Conservative
26th	2004–2008	Denis Ducharme	Progressive; Conservative
27th	2008–2012	Genia Leskiw	Progressive; Conservative
28th	2012–2015	Genia Leskiw	Progressive; Conservative
29th	2015–2017	Scott Cyr	Wildrose
29th	2017–2019	Scott Cyr	United Conservative
See Bonnyville-Cold Lake-St. Paul after 2019

In the district's first election in 1997, Progressive Conservative candidate Dennis Ducharme defeated incumbent Liberal MLA Leo Vasseur by a wide margin to pick up the newly renamed district for his party.

Ducharme was re-elected with landslides in 2001 with over 70% of the vote and in 2004 with almost 65% of the vote. He was appointed to the cabinet briefly in 2006 under the government of Ralph Klein. He retired in 2008.

The second representative of the district was Genia Leskiw. She won her first election with a landslide of over 75% of the popular vote, and held the riding from Wildrose challenger Roy Doonanco in 2012 by only a 7% margin.

In the 2015 election, Wildrose candidate Scott Cyr won by a significant margin over Progressive Conservative candidate Craig Copeland, who was running during a hiatus from being the mayor of Cold Lake. He subsequently joined the United Conservative Party when the parties merged in 2017.

Despite the hotly contested elections in 2012 and 2015, Ducharme, Leskiw, Cyr, and Copeland jointly endorsed Jason Kenney for Conservative leader in its 2017 leadership election.

== Election results ==
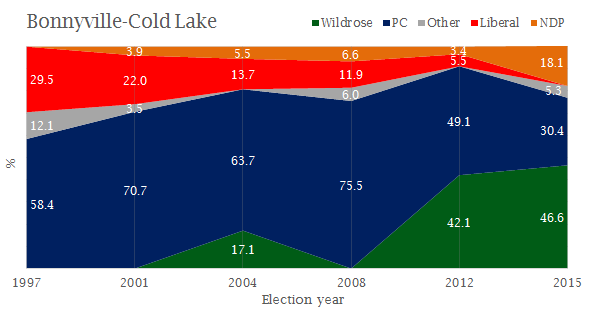
Graphical summary of results, 1997–2015.

=== 1997 ===
1997 Alberta general election
Party	Candidate	Votes	%	±%
Progressive Conservative	Denis Ducharme	4,593	58.41%	+12.81%
Liberal	Leo Vasseur	2,323	29.54%	-17.66%
Social Credit	Robert Kratchmer	948	12.05%	–
Total		7,864	–	–
Rejected, spoiled and declined		11	–	–
Eligible electors / turnout		16,185	48.66%	-6.54%
Progressive Conservative notional gain from Liberal		Swing		+15.24%
Source(s) "Beaver River Official Results 1997 Alberta general election". Alberta Heritage Community Foundation.

=== 2001 ===
2001 Alberta general election
Party	Candidate	Votes	%	±%
Progressive Conservative	Denis Ducharme	5,641	70.65%	+12.24%
Liberal	Ronald Young	1,755	21.98%	-7.56%
New Democratic	Ellen Ulfsten	313	3.92%	–
Independent	James Skretteberg	275	3.45%	–
Total		7,984	–	–
Rejected, spoiled and declined		44	–	–
Eligible electors / turnout		16,688	48.11%	-0.55%
Progressive Conservative hold		Swing		+9.90%
Source(s) "2001 Statement of Official results Bonnyville-Cold Lake" (PDF). Elections Alberta.

=== 2004 ===
2004 Alberta general election
Party	Candidate	Votes	%	±%
Progressive Conservative	Denis Ducharme	3,621	63.68%	-6.97%
Alberta Alliance	Shane Gervais	973	17.11%	–
Liberal	Lloyd Mildon	781	13.74%	-8.24%
New Democratic	Denise Ogonoski	311	5.47%	1.55%
Total		5,686	–	–
Rejected, spoiled, and declined		42	–	–
Eligible electors / turnout		17,704	32.35%	-15.76%
Progressive Conservative hold		Swing		-12.04%
Source(s) "Bonnyville-Cold Lake Statement of Official Results 2004 Alberta general election" (PDF). Elections Alberta.

=== 2008 ===
2008 Alberta general election
Party	Candidate	Votes	%	±%
Progressive Conservative	Genia Leskiw	4,437	75.54%	+12.06%
Liberal	Justin Yassoub	698	11.88%	-1.86%
New Democratic	Jason Sloychuk	389	6.62%	+1.15%
Green	Jennifer Brown	350	5.96%	–
Total		5,874	–	–
Rejected, spoiled and declined		49	–	–
Eligible electors / turnout		21,049	28.14%	-4.21%
Progressive Conservative hold		Swing		6.96%
Source(s) The Report on the March 3, 2008 Provincial General Election of the Twenty-seventh Legislative Assembly. Elections Alberta. July 28, 2008. pp. 381–385. "Elections Alberta 2008 General Election". Elections Alberta.

=== 2012 ===
2012 Alberta general election
Party	Candidate	Votes	%	±%
Progressive Conservative	Genia Leskiw	4,816	49.09%	-26.45%
Wildrose	Roy Doonanco	4,128	42.08%	–
Liberal	Hubert Rodden	535	5.45%	-6.43%
New Democratic	Luanne Bannister	330	3.36%	-3.26%
Total valid votes		9,809	–	–
Rejected, spoiled, and declined		85	–	–
Eligible electors / turnout		22,170	44.63%	+16.49%
Progressive Conservative hold		Swing		-34.27%
Source(s) Source: "Elections Alberta 2012 General Election". Elections Alberta.

=== 2015 ===
2015 Alberta general election
Party	Candidate	Votes	%	±%
Wildrose	Scott Cyr	5,452	46.55%	+4.47%
Progressive Conservative	Craig Copeland	3,594	30.43%	-18.66%
New Democratic	Josalyne Head	2,136	18.09%	+14.73%
Alberta Party	Rob Fox	628	5.32%	–
Total valid votes		11,810	–	–
Rejected, spoiled, and declined		45	–	–
Eligible electors / turnout		24,714	47.97%	+3.34%
Wildrose gain from Progressive Conservative		Swing		+11.57%
Source(s) Source: "Elections Alberta 2015 General Election". Elections Alberta.

== Senate nominee election results ==
=== 2004 ===
2004 Senate nominee election results: Bonnyville-Cold Lake				Turnout 32.32%	
Affiliation	Candidate	Votes	% votes	% ballots	Rank
Progressive Conservative	Betty Unger	2,250	14.94%	48.23%	2
Progressive Conservative	Bert Brown	2,098	13.93%	44.97%	1
Progressive Conservative	Cliff Breitkreuz	1,832	12.17%	39.27%	3
Independent	Link Byfield	1,484	9.86%	31.81%	4
Progressive Conservative	David Usherwood	1,446	9.60%	31.00%	6
Alberta Alliance	Michael Roth	1,344	8.93%	28.81%	7
Progressive Conservative	Jim Silye	1,296	8.61%	27.78%	5
Alberta Alliance	Vance Gough	1,265	8.40%	27.76%	8
Alberta Alliance	Gary Horan	1,217	8.08%	26.09%	10
Independent	Tom Sindlinger	825	5.48%	17.69%	9
Total votes		15,057	100%		
Total ballots		4,665	3.23 votes per ballot		
Rejected, spoiled and declined		1,056			

Voters had the option of selecting four candidates on the ballot

=== 2012 ===
2012 Senate nominee election results: Bonnyville-Cold Lake				Turnout 43.85%	
Affiliation	Candidate	Votes	% votes	% ballots	Rank
Wildrose	Raymond Germain	4,043	18.68%	46.02%	5
Progressive Conservative	Doug Black	3,518	16.25%	40.05%	1
Progressive Conservative	Scott Tannas	3,098	14.31%	35.26%	2
Progressive Conservative	Mike Shaikh	2,601	12.02%	29.61%	3
Wildrose	Rob Gregory	2,548	11.77%	29.00%	4
Wildrose	Vitor Marciano	2,180	10.07%	24.82%	6
Evergreen	Elizabeth Johannson	855	3.95%	9.73%	7
Independent	David Fletcher	672	3.10%	7.65%	9
Independent	Len Bracko	487	2.25%	5.54%	8
Independent	Ian Urquhart	469	2.17%	5.34%	10
Independent	Paul Frank	465	2.15%	5.29%	11
Independent	William Exelby	366	1.69%	4.17%	12
Independent	Perry Chahal	344	1.59%	3.92%	13
Total votes		21,646	100%		
Total ballots		8,785	2.46 votes per ballot		
Rejected, spoiled and declined		944			

Voters had the option of selecting three candidates on the ballot

== Student vote results ==
=== 2004 ===
Participating schools
Assumption Jr/Sr High School
Elizabeth School
LeGoff School
Notre Dame High School

On November 19, 2004, a student vote was conducted at participating Alberta schools to parallel the 2004 Alberta general election results. The vote was designed to educate students and simulate the electoral process for persons who have not yet reached the legal majority. The vote was conducted in 80 of the 83 provincial electoral districts with students voting for actual election candidates. Schools with a large student body that reside in another electoral district had the option to vote for candidates outside of the electoral district then where they were physically located.

2004 Alberta student vote results
Affiliation	Candidate	Votes	%
Progressive Conservative	Denis Ducharme	257	38.07%
Liberal	Lloyd Mildon	173	25.63%
New Democratic	Denise Ogonoski	152	22.52%
Alberta Alliance	Shane Gervais	93	13.78%
Total valid votes		675	
Rejected, spoiled, and declined		30	

=== 2012 ===
2012 Alberta student vote results
Affiliation	Candidate	Votes	%
Progressive Conservative	Genia Leskiw	297	42.73%
Wildrose	Roy Doonanco	243	34.96%
Liberal	Hubert Rodden	91	13.09%
New Democratic	Luanne Bannister	64	9.21%
Total valid votes		695	

== See also ==
- List of Alberta provincial electoral districts
- Canadian provincial electoral districts
