= Lac La Biche-St. Paul-Two Hills =

Defunct provincial electoral district in Alberta, Canada

Alberta electoral district
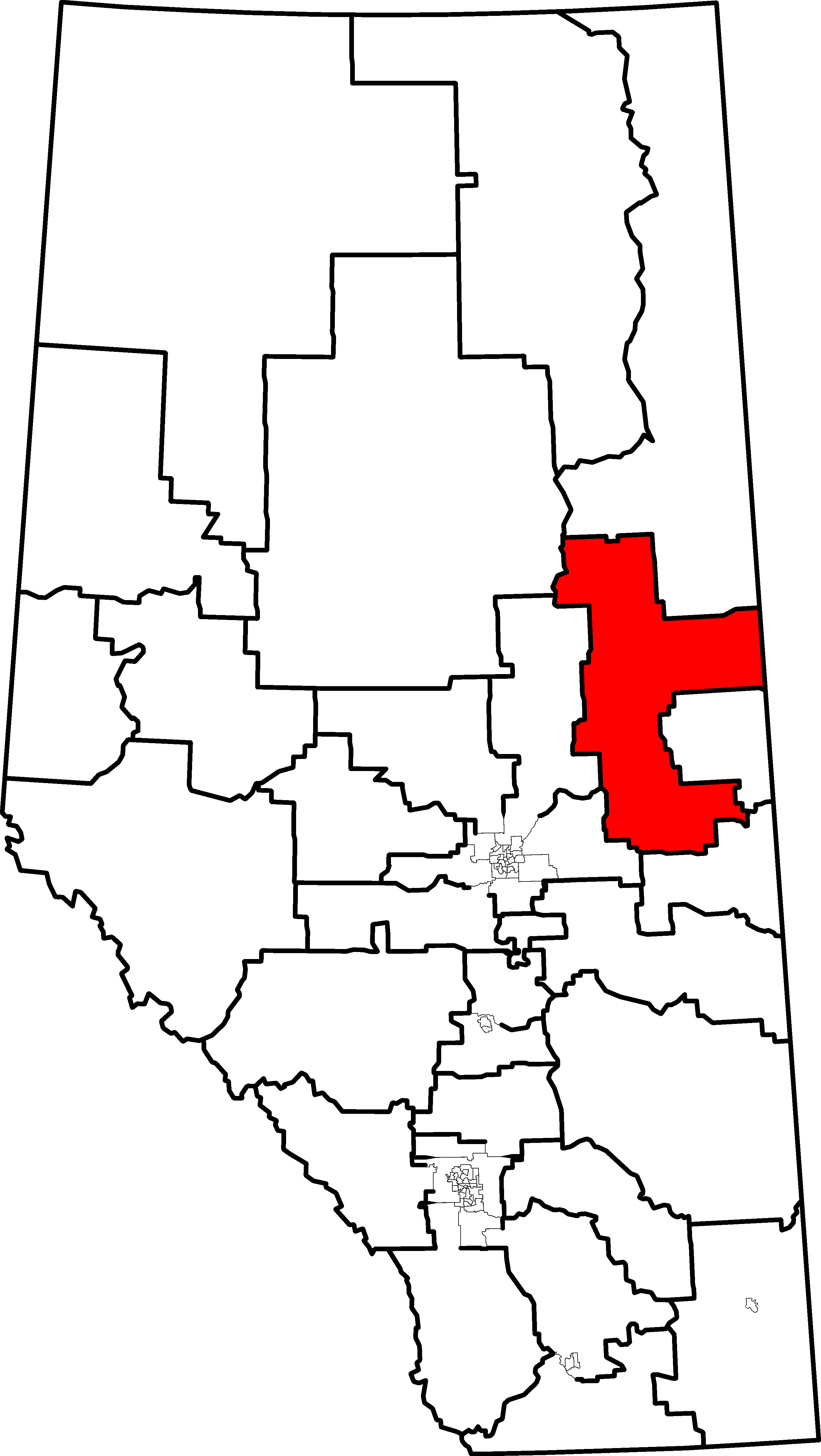
- 2010 boundaries

Defunct provincial electoral district
- Legislature: Legislative Assembly of Alberta
- District created: 2010
- District abolished: 2017
- First contested: 2012
- Last contested: 2015

Lac La Biche-St. Paul-Two Hills was a provincial electoral district in Alberta, Canada, mandated to return a single member to the Legislative Assembly of Alberta using first-past-the-post balloting from 2012 to 2019. The district was created in the 2010 boundary redistribution, and was first contested in the 2012 election. It was last contested in the 2015 election, when it returned Dave Hanson of the Wildrose Party.

== History ==
=== Boundary history ===
The electoral district was created in the 2010 Alberta boundary re-distribution. It was created from the electoral district of Lac La Biche-St. Paul which was altered to bound current municipal boundaries. Two Hills was added to the name at the request of local residents.

The Electoral Boundaries Commission recommended splitting the district up in 2017, creating Fort McMurray-Lac La Biche and Bonnyville-Cold Lake-St. Paul, while transferring the area around Two Hills to Fort Saskatchewan-Vegreville and a small area to Athabasca-Barrhead-Westlock.

65 Lac La Biche-St. Paul-Two Hills 2010 boundaries
Bordering districts
North	East	West	South
Fort McMurray-Conklin	Bonnyville-Cold Lake	Athabasca-Sturgeon-Redwater, Fort Saskatchewan-Vegreville and Lesser Slave Lake	Vermilion-Lloydminster
Legal description from the Statutes of Alberta 2010, Electoral Divisions Act.
Note:

Members of the Legislative Assembly for Lac La Biche-St. Paul-Two Hills
Assembly	Years	Member	Party
See Lac La Biche-St. Paul 1993-2012
28th	2012-2015	Shayne Saskiw	Wildrose
29th	2015-2017	Dave Hanson	Wildrose
29th	2017-2019	Dave Hanson	United Conservative
See Fort McMurray-Lac La Biche, Bonnyville-Cold Lake- St. Paul and Fort Saskatchewan-Vegreville after 2019

=== Electoral history ===
Since the riding was renamed, it has been represented only by the Wildrose Party of Alberta, although its antecedent had been held by several parties, most prominently the Progressive Conservatives. The first MLA was Shayne Saskiw, who was elected in 2012 and resigned prior to the 2015 election. Dave Hanson was elected to represent the district in the 2015 election.

== Legislative election results ==
=== 2012 ===
2012 Alberta general election
Party	Candidate	Votes	%	±%
Wildrose	Shayne Saskiw	5,949	46.56%	–
Progressive Conservative	Ray Danyluk	5,418	42.40%	-28.88%
New Democratic	Phil Johnson	706	5.53%	-5.42%
Liberal	John Nowak	704	5.51%	-12.26%
Total valid votes		12,777	–	–
Rejected, spoiled and declined		99	–	–
Electors / turnout		21,729	59.26%	+15.03%
Wildrose notional gain from Progressive Conservative		Swing		+37.72%
Source(s) "Election Results - LAC LA BICHE-ST. PAUL-TWO HILLS". officialresults.elections.ab.ca. Elections Alberta.

=== 2015 ===
2015 Alberta general election
Party	Candidate	Votes	%	±%
Wildrose	Dave Hanson	4,760	38.65%	-7.91%
New Democratic	Catherine Harder	4,213	34.21%	+28.68%
Progressive Conservative	Darrell Younghans	3,002	24.38%	-18.02%
Green	Brian Deheer	340	2.76%	–
Total valid votes		12,315	–	–
Rejected, spoiled and declined		73	–	–
Electors/turnout		23,476	52.77%	-6.49%
Wildrose hold		Swing		-18.30%
Source(s) "Election Results - LAC LA BICHE-ST. PAUL-TWO HILLS". officialresults.elections.ab.ca. Elections Alberta.

== Graphical representation ==
2012
5.5%	5.5%	42.4%	46.6%
NDP	Liberal	Progressive Conservative	Wildrose

2015
34.2%	24.4%	38.7%
New Democrat	Progressive Conservative	Wildrose

== See also ==
- List of Alberta provincial electoral districts
- Canadian provincial electoral districts
