= Shayne Saskiw =

Alberta politician

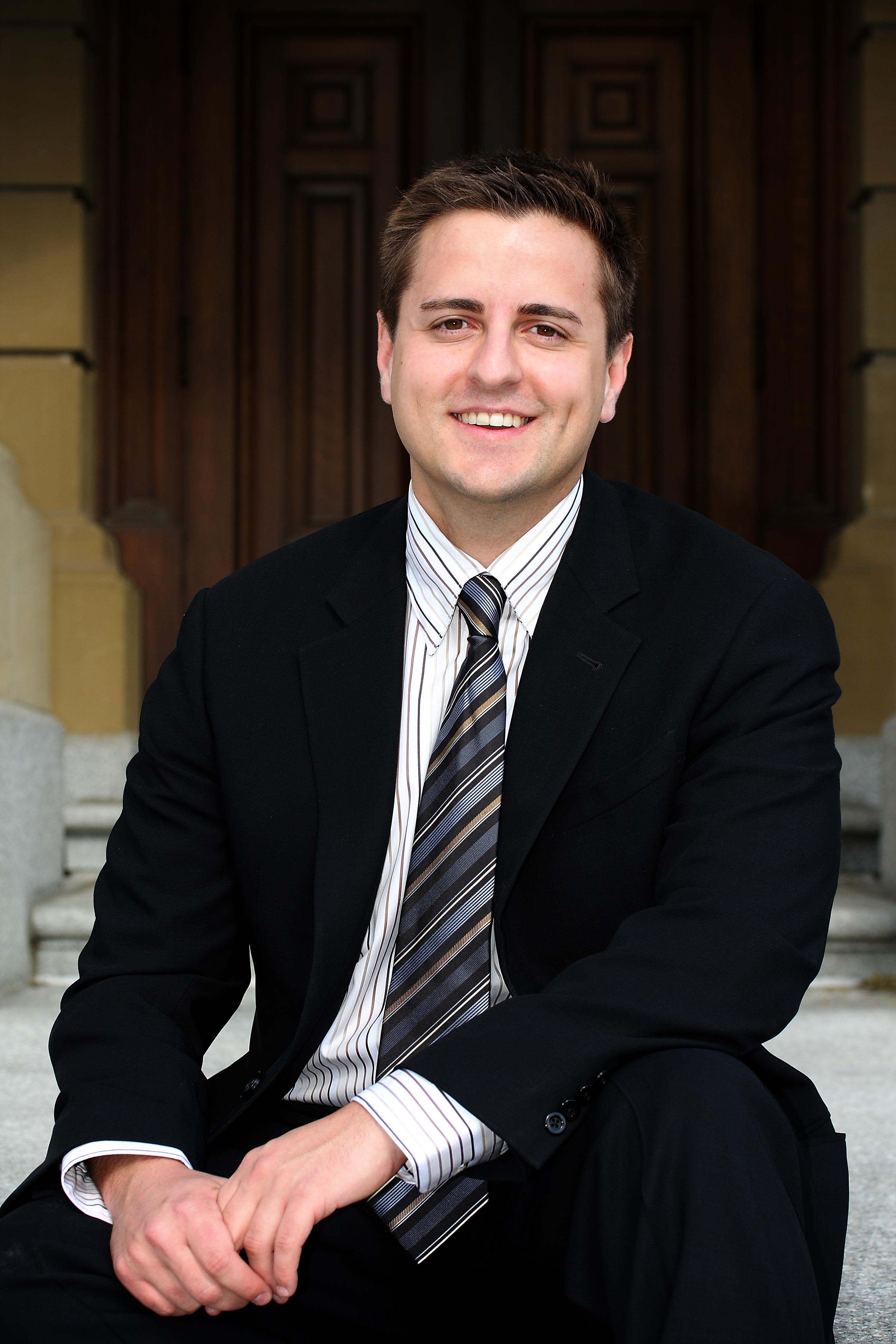

Member of the Legislative Assembly of Alberta for Lac La Biche-St. Paul-Two Hills
- In office April 23, 2012 – May 5, 2015
- Preceded by: first member
- Succeeded by: Dave Hanson

Personal details
- Born: August 13, 1981 (age 45) County of Two Hills No. 21, Alberta
- Party: Wildrose
- Spouse: Shannon Stubbs
- Education: University of Alberta
- Occupation: lawyer

Shayne Saskiw (born August 13, 1981) is a Canadian politician who was elected to the Legislative Assembly of Alberta representing the electoral district of Lac La Biche-St. Paul-Two Hills in the 2012 provincial election. Saskiw was the Justice and Solicitor General Critic and Deputy House Leader for the Wildrose Official Opposition, from 2012 to 2015. He is currently the co-founder and owner of TappCar, a vehicle for hire company.

== Background ==
Born in 1981 and raised in the area of Two Hills, Alberta, Saskiw completed his Bachelor of Commerce degree in 2003 and graduated from the University of Alberta Faculty of Law in 2006 with the second highest academic standing in his class. He clerked for the Tax Court of Canada and worked for a tax law boutique firm in Edmonton prior to joining the Vegreville office of Duncan & Craig LLP.

== Legislative career ==
In August 2012, Saskiw and MLA Drew Barnes toured Highway 63 to Fort McMurray, and subsequently released a report called "Getting it Done: An on-the-ground look at twinning and improving safety on Highway 63," calling on government to commit to a timeline to complete the twinning of the highway.

Saskiw was one of the five remaining Wildrose MLAs who had not crossed the floor to join the governing PCs in December 2014. On March 12, 2015, he announced that while he had considered running for the leadership of the party, he was disillusioned with politics and would not be running for re-election in the next general election but would instead try to promote conservative issues outside of party politics.

== Electoral history ==
2012 Alberta general election: Lac La Biche-St. Paul-Two Hills
Party	Candidate	Votes	%	±%
Wildrose	Shayne Saskiw	5,949	46.56%	–
Progressive Conservative	Ray Danyluk	5,418	42.40%	-28.88%
New Democratic	Phil Johnson	706	5.53%	-5.42%
Liberal	John Nowak	704	5.51%	-12.26%
Total valid votes		12,777	–	–
Rejected, spoiled and declined		99	–	–
Electors / turnout		21,729	59.26%	+15.03%
Wildrose notional gain from Progressive Conservative		Swing		+37.72%
Source(s) "Election Results - LAC LA BICHE-ST. PAUL-TWO HILLS". officialresults.elections.ab.ca. Elections Alberta.
