= Ernie Isley (politician) =

Canadian politician (born 1937)

The Honourable Ernie Isley ECA

Member of the Legislative Assembly of Alberta
- In office 1979–1993
- Preceded by: Donald Hansen
- Succeeded by: Leo Vasseur
- Constituency: Bonnyville

Minister of Manpower
- In office November 1982 – Between September 1986 and March 1987
- Preceded by: Jim Horsman
- Succeeded by: Rick Orman

Minister of Public Works, Supply, and Services
- In office May 1986 – March 1989
- Preceded by: Tom Chambers
- Succeeded by: Ken Kowalski

Minister of Agriculture, Food, and Rural Development
- In office March 1989 – June 1993
- Preceded by: Peter Elzinga
- Succeeded by: Walter Paszkowski

Mayor of Bonnyville
- In office March 2006 – October 2013

Personal details
- Born: June 29, 1937 (age 88) Vermilion, Alberta
- Party: Progressive Conservative; Wildrose Alliance

Ernest Douglas "Ernie" Isley ECA (born June 29, 1937) is a former school principal and provincial and municipal level politician from Alberta, Canada. He served as a member of the Legislative Assembly of Alberta from 1979 to 1993. He is the former mayor for the town of Bonnyville, Alberta, Isley served that post after being acclaimed in a by-election on March 7, 2006, until being defeated by Gene Sobolewski on October 21, 2013.

== Early life ==
Isley served for seven years as Principal for Bonnyville Centralized High School before running for provincial office.

== Provincial political career ==
Isley was elected to the Alberta Legislature in the 1979 Alberta general election. He won the electoral district of Bonnyville defeating four other candidates to hold it for the Progressive Conservatives. He won his second term and a larger plurality facing two other candidates to win the 1982 Alberta general election. His third time running for office in the 1986 Alberta general election, would see him win his third term with a reduced but comfortable plurality. He would again defeat two other candidates, his strongest challenger was New Democrat candidate Thomas Tucker.

Isley would run for a fourth term in office in the 1989 Alberta general election.

He ran for a fifth term in office in the 1993 Alberta general election but was narrowly defeated in a by Liberal candidate Leo Vasseur.

During his term in office, he served in several cabinet portfolios, including Public Works and Agriculture. He gained criticism in the early 1990s when under his direction, the amalgamation of the towns of Cold Lake and Grand Centre was initiated with CFB Cold Lake-4 Wing.

In 2009, Wildrose Alliance Danielle Smith welcomed Isley into the Wildrose Alliance Party, although he was also a card-carrying member of the Conservative Party. and he has been a key organizer for the Leader and Party in the Bonnyville - Cold Lake constituency.

In September 2010, Isley helped organize a tour for Wildrose Leader Danielle Smith to Bonnyville, Cold Lake, and Glendon. Isley said in an interview that his goal in life is to do everything possible in the next two years to elect a Wildrose government in the next election, which did not happen.

== Municipal career ==
Isley was acclaimed as the Mayor of Bonnyville, Alberta in a by-election held on March 7, 2006. He was returned by acclamation in the 2007 Bonnyville municipal election. He would continue to serve as Bonnyville's mayor until 2013, when he ran for a fourth term even though he'd publicly stated he was retiring. He was soundly defeated by Gene Sobolewski.
