= Jessie Lake =

Kettle lake in east-northern Alberta, Canada

- Location within Alberta
- Location: Bonnyville / Bonnyville No. 87, Alberta
- Coordinates: 54°15′N 110°44′W
- Primary outflows: Muriel Creek
- Basin countries: Canada
- Max. length: 3.5 km (2.2 mi)
- Max. width: 2 km (1.2 mi)
- Surface area: 5 km^{2} (1.9 sq mi)
- Surface elevation: 555 m (1,821 ft)
- Settlements: Bonnyville

Jessie Lake is a kettle lake in east-northern Alberta, Canada.

The northern shore of Jessie Lake borders the town of Bonnyville and extends almost five kilometres from east to west. On the west side it is intersected by a tertiary highway running south to the community of Kehewin. To the east it is intersected by a causeway and small bridge comprising part of the eight kilometre hard surface trail which circumnavigates the lake.

The lake hosts thousands of ducks, Canada geese, American coots, blackbirds and other bird species throughout the period from April through October. Muskrats are often seen. Shooting is prohibited. The trail roughly follows the shore passing two tall lookout towers and four lookout platforms. Green algae covers large parts of the lake and reeds and marsh constitute much of the shore. A small low wooded island is found in the centre. It's very common that, at the beginning of both summer and fall, the paths will overflow with water and thus non-traversable.
