= TappCar =

Canadian ridesharing company

TappCar Inc.
- Founded: 2016; 10 years ago
- Founders: Jonathon Wescott; Shayne Saskiw
- Defunct: 2022
- Fate: Ceased operations
- Headquarters: Edmonton, Alberta
- Area served: Edmonton; Calgary; Winnipeg
- Website: www.tappcar.ca

TappCar was a ridesharing company based in Edmonton, Alberta. The company was the third largest ride-sharing service in Canada, with operations in Edmonton, Grande Prairie and Winnipeg.

== History ==
TappCar was launched with 200 drivers in Edmonton on March 14, 2016.

In July 2016, TappCar struck a merger deal with St. Albert based cab company Aaron Taxi. The taxi company encouraged all of its 9 drivers to move to the TappCar model. Aaron Taxi's owner, Jean-Pierre Cloutier was named TappCar's new chief operating officer.

In September 2019, the company announced plans to expand into British Columbia, with plans to operate Kelowna and Victoria in addition to the Metro Vancouver.

== Closure ==
In early 2021, TappCar shuttered operations in all Canadian cities except Winnipeg. On June 26, 2022, TappCar ceased operations in Winnipeg, its final remaining market, effectively ending the company's operations entirely. CEO Noel Bernier attributed the closure to the COVID-19 pandemic, which caused a 95 percent drop in passenger levels in March 2020, combined with rising fuel prices and increased competition from Uber, which had entered the Manitoba market.
