= Moose Lake Township, Minnesota =

Moose Lake Township is the name of some places in the U.S. state of Minnesota:

- Moose Lake Township, Beltrami County, Minnesota
- Moose Lake Township, Carlton County, Minnesota
- Moose Lake Township, Cass County, Minnesota

== See also ==
- Moose Lake (disambiguation)
