= Moose Lake Provincial Park =

Provincial park in Alberta, Canada

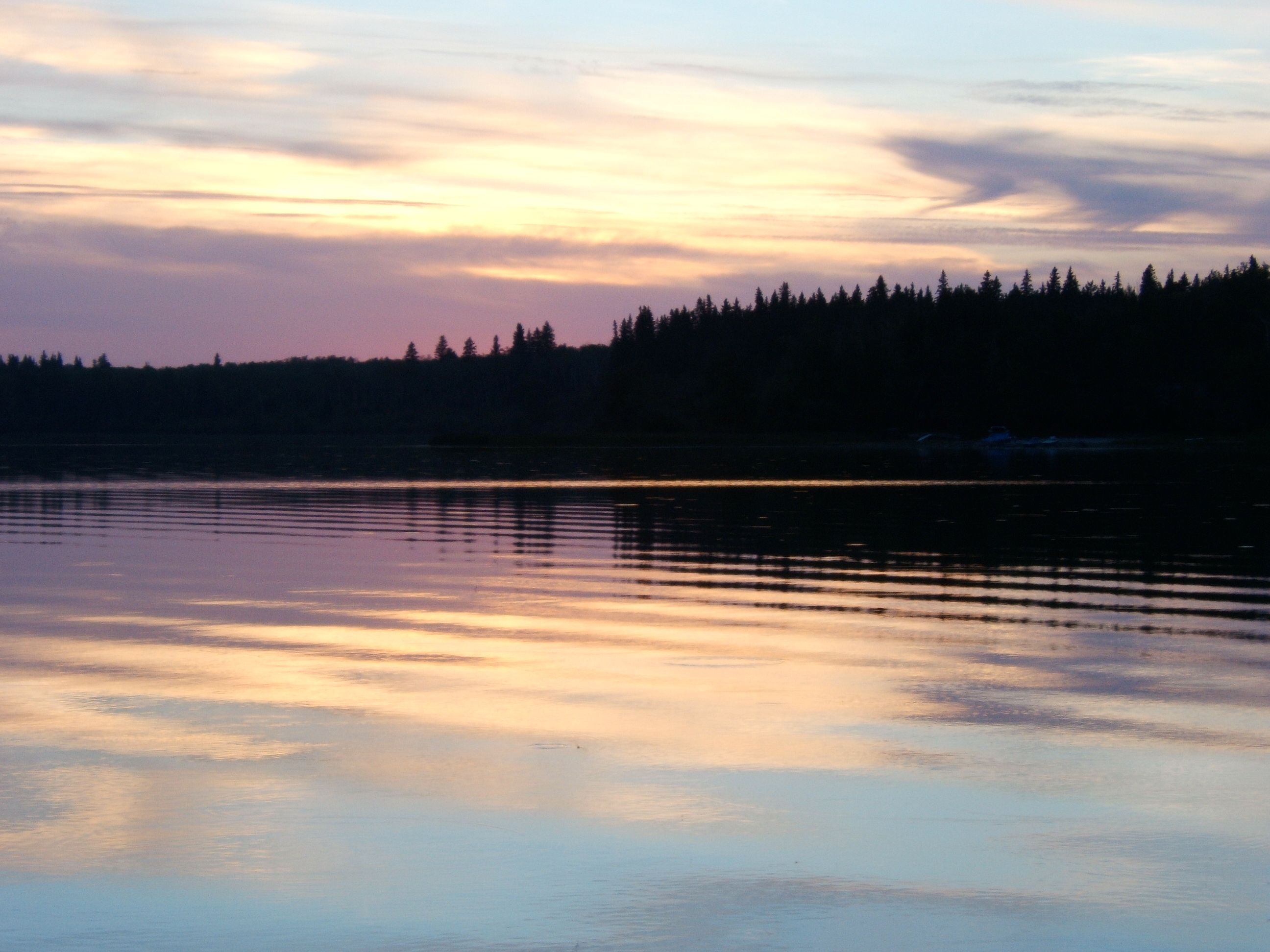
- Moose Lake

- Location within Alberta
- Interactive map of Moose Lake Provincial Park
- Location: Bonnyville No. 87, Alberta, Canada
- Nearest city: Bonnyville
- Coordinates: 54°15′50″N 110°55′55″W
- Area: 16.5 km^{2} (6.4 sq mi)
- Established: April 19, 1967
- Governing body: Alberta Tourism, Parks and Recreation

Moose Lake Provincial Park is a provincial park in northern Alberta, Canada, located 15 km (9.3 mi) west of Bonnyville.

The park is situated around Moose Lake, at an elevation of 535 m (1,755 ft) and has a surface of 16.5 km^{2} (6.4 sq mi). It was established on April 19, 1967 and is maintained by Alberta Tourism, Parks and Recreation.

== Activities ==
The following activities are available in the park:

- Beach activities on the shores of Moose Lake and Mooselake River
  - Power boating
  - Sailing
  - Swimming
  - Water-skiing
  - Windsurfing
- Camping
- Canoeing and kayaking
- Fishing (brook stickleback, burbot, Iowa darter, lake whitefish, ninespine stickleback, northern pike, spottail shiner, tullibee, walleye, white sucker, yellow perch)
- Front country hiking

== See also ==
- List of provincial parks in Alberta
- List of Canadian provincial parks
- List of National Parks of Canada
