= Scott Cyr =

Canadian politician

Scott Cyr MLA
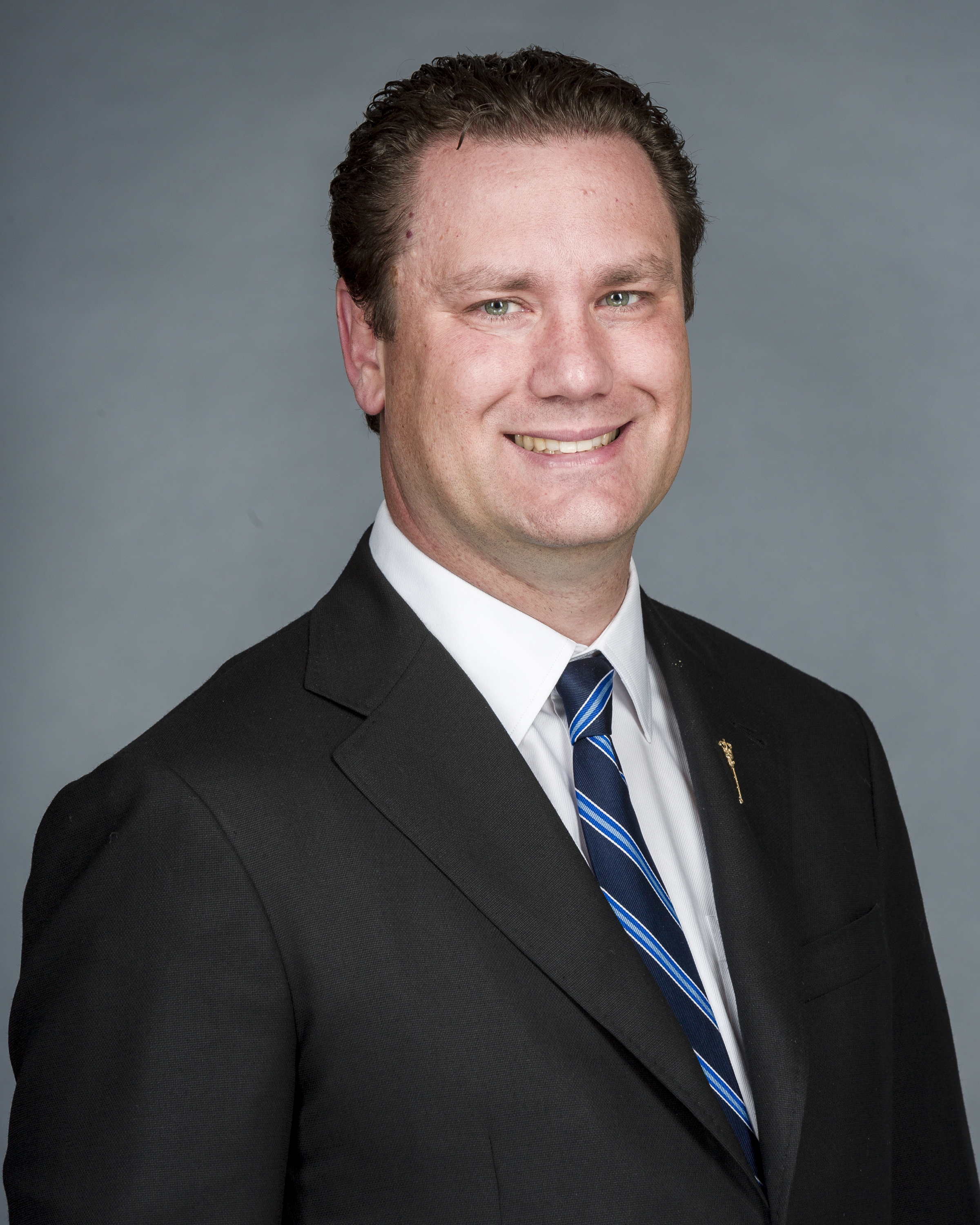

Member of the Legislative Assembly of Alberta for Bonnyville-Cold Lake-St. Paul
- Incumbent
- Assumed office May 29, 2023
- Preceded by: Dave Hanson

Member of the Legislative Assembly of Alberta for Bonnyville-Cold Lake
- In office May 5, 2015 – March 19, 2019
- Preceded by: Genia Leskiw
- Succeeded by: district abolished

Personal details
- Born: 1971 or 1972 (age 54–55) Slave Lake, Alberta
- Party: United Conservative
- Other political affiliations: Wildrose (2015–17)
- Education: University of Lethbridge
- Occupation: Accountant, Power engineer

Scott Joseph Cyr (born 1972 or 1973) is a Canadian politician who represents the electoral district of Bonnyville-Cold Lake-St. Paul in the Legislative Assembly of Alberta. He previously represented the predecessor riding Bonnyville-Cold Lake from 2015 to 2019.

== Political career ==
Cyr was first elected in 2015, defeating his Progressive Conservative rival Craig Copeland to pick up Bonnyville-Cold Lake for Wildrose. The PC's had held the riding since 1997.

=== Shadow cabinet ===
When Wildrose leader Brian Jean unveiled his shadow cabinet in June 2015, Cyr was given the position of Deputy Whip, as well as Shadow Minister of Justice & Solicitor General.

In 2017, Cyr sponsored the Protecting Victims of Non-Consensual Distribution of Intimate Images Act, a private member's bill that introduced a new tort law in Alberta covering the non-consensual sharing of explicit images. He cited a conversation with one of his daughters as the inspiration for the bill, as well as the highly-publicized cases of Amanda Todd and Rehtaeh Parsons. NDP Justice Minister Kathleen Ganley announced her support for the bill in the Legislature, and it was passed unanimously. The law came into force on August 4, 2017.

Cyr was moved to the role of Shadow Minister for Service Alberta in December 2016. When Wildrose merged with the Progressive Conservatives, he joined the new party and retained his role as critic.

=== Exit and return to politics ===
The redistribution of electoral boundaries in 2017 placed both Cyr and fellow caucus member Dave Hanson in the new riding of Bonnyville-Cold Lake-St. Paul, leading Cyr to decide not to seek re-election. However, in 2023 Cyr challenged Hanson in the local UCP candidate selection, defeating him by one vote. Cyr returned to the Legislature for its 31st Assembly.

== Personal life ==
Cyr holds a management degree in accounting and finance from the University of Lethbridge as well as a class 4 power engineering certificate. He worked as an accountant for 14 years prior to his election to the Legislative Assembly in 2015. He, his wife, and their two daughters reside in Cold Lake.

== Electoral history ==
=== 2023 general election ===
2023 Alberta general election: Bonnyville-Cold Lake-St. Paul
| Party | Candidate | Votes | % | ±% |
|---|---|---|---|---|
| United Conservative | Scott Cyr | 13,315 | 75.47 | +2.38 |
| New Democratic | Caitlyn Blake | 4,327 | 24.53 | +10.50 |
| Total | | 17,642 | 99.48 | – |
| Rejected and declined | | 92 | 0.52 | |
| Turnout | | 17,734 | 51.52 | |
| Eligible electors | | 34,419 | | |
| United Conservative hold | | Swing | | -4.06 |
Source(s) Source: Elections Alberta

UCP Bonnyville-Cold Lake-St. Paul nomination contest: December 10-12, 2022

| Candidate | Round 1 | | Round 2 | |
| Candidate | Votes | % | Votes | % |
|---|---|---|---|---|
| Scott Cyr | 252 | 34.7 | 314 | 50.1 |
| Dave Hanson | 289 | 39.8 | 313 | 49.9 |
| Greg Sawchuk | 186 | 25.6 | Eliminated | |
| Total | 727 | 100.0 | 627 | 100.0 |

=== 2015 general election ===
2015 Alberta general election: Bonnyville-Cold Lake
| Party | Candidate | Votes | % | ±% |
|---|---|---|---|---|
| Wildrose | Scott Cyr | 5,452 | 46.55% | +4.47% |
| Progressive Conservative | Craig Copeland | 3,594 | 30.43% | -18.66% |
| New Democratic | Josalyne Head | 2,136 | 18.09% | +14.73% |
| Alberta Party | Rob Fox | 628 | 5.32% | – |
| Total valid votes | | 11,810 | – | – |
| Rejected, spoiled, and declined | | 45 | – | – |
| Eligible electors / turnout | | 24,714 | 47.97% | +3.34% |
| Wildrose gain from Progressive Conservative | | Swing | | +11.57% |
Source(s) Source: "Elections Alberta 2015 General Election". Elections Alberta.
