= Jake Josvanger =

Canadian politician

Jake H. Josvanger

Member of the Legislative Assembly of Alberta
- In office June 29, 1955 – June 18, 1959
- Preceded by: Laudas Joly
- Succeeded by: Karl Nordstrom
- Constituency: Bonnyville

Personal details
- Born: December 22, 1908 Dilke, Saskatchewan
- Died: June 30, 1966 (aged 57)
- Party: Liberal
- Occupation: politician

Jake H. Josvanger (December 22, 1908 – June 30, 1966) was a former provincial and municipal level politician from Alberta, Canada. He served as a member of the Legislative Assembly of Alberta from 1955 to 1959 sitting with the Liberal caucus in opposition. He was also a municipal councilor for the Municipal District of Bonnyville No. 87.

== Political career ==
Josvanger ran for a seat to the Legislative Assembly of Alberta in the provincial election as a candidate for the Liberals. He won the Bonnyville electoral district defeating two other candidates with just over 50% of the popular vote.

He was elected later that year as a municipal councilor for the Municipal District of Bonnyville No. 87 in the first election held after its creation in 1955. Josvanger would serve both political posts.

Josvanger ran for a second term in provincial office in the 1959 Alberta general election. He was defeated by Social Credit candidate Karl Nordstrom, finishing second in the three way race.
