= Karl Nordstrom =

Canadian politician

Karl Earnest Nordstrom

Member of the Legislative Assembly of Alberta
- Preceded by: Jake Josvanger
- Succeeded by: Romeo Lamothe
- Constituency: Bonnyville

Personal details
- Born: July 1, 1920 St. Paul, Alberta
- Died: October 10, 1961 (aged 41) Edmonton, Alberta
- Party: Social Credit
- Occupation: politician

Karl Earnest Nordstrom (July 1, 1920 – October 10, 1961) was a provincial politician from Alberta, Canada. He served as a member of the Legislative Assembly of Alberta from 1959 until his death in 1961 sitting with the Social Credit caucus in government.

== Political career ==
Nordstrom ran for a seat to the Alberta Legislature in the 1959 Alberta general election as a Social Credit candidate in the Bonnyville electoral district. He defeated incumbent Liberal MLA Jake Josvanger and another candidate with a solid majority to pick up the seat for his party.

After the election Nordstrom's health started failing. He missed most of the second session in 1961 due to illness. He was hospitalized in Edmonton, Alberta, at the beginning of October 1961 when his condition became critical. He died days later on October 10, 1961.
