= Denis Ducharme =

Canadian politician

Denis Archie Ducharme ECA (born March 14, 1955, in Bonnyville, Alberta, Canada) is a former Albertan MLA. From April 6 until December 15, 2006, he also served as Minister of Community Development. He did not seek re-election in the 2008 election.

== Political career ==
In 1986, Ducharme was elected to the Lakeland Catholic School Board. During his two terms with the board he served as a trustee, vice-chairman, and chairman.

He was first elected as a Member of the Legislative Assembly on March 11, 1997, defeating Liberal incumbent Leo Vasseur in the new riding of Bonnyville-Cold Lake. He was re-elected to his second term on March 12, 2001, and to his third term on November 22, 2004. In addition to his duties as MLA, Ducharme has served as Government Caucus Whip, Chair of the Francophone Secretariat, co-chair of the Alberta Energy Research Institute (AERI), Deputy Chairman of the Special Standing committee on Members’ Services, and Deputy Chairman of the Standing Committee on Legislative Offices.

During his time in the Alberta Legislature, Ducharme sponsored four bills: Fair Trading Act; Maintenance Enforcement Amendment Act; Metis Settlements Statutes Amendment Act; and Fair Trading Amendment Act, 2000.

== Personal life ==
Prior to being elected, he was involved with his family-owned Ford automotive dealership, Ducharme Motors Ltd., which has been operating in Bonnyville since 1959. He was involved in all aspects of dealership management and held a business interest in the operation from 1981 to 1994.

Ducharme and his wife, Rose, currently live in Bonnyville and have two adult children.

Ducharme is also one of the notable Franco-Albertans, in part due to the Bonnyville-Cold Lake area having a very large Francophone population in comparison to the rest of the province.

== Election results ==
1997 Alberta general election: Bonnyville-Cold Lake
| Party | Candidate | Votes | % | ±% |
|---|---|---|---|---|
| Progressive Conservative | Denis Ducharme | 4,593 | 58.41% | +12.81% |
| Liberal | Leo Vasseur | 2,323 | 29.54% | -17.66% |
| Social Credit | Robert Kratchmer | 948 | 12.05% | |
| Total | | 7,864 | | |
| Rejected, spoiled and declined | | 11 | | |
| Eligible electors / Turnout | | 16,185 | 48.66% | -6.54% |
| Progressive Conservative notional gain from Liberal | | Swing | | +15.24% |

2001 Alberta general election: Bonnyville-Cold Lake
| Party | Candidate | Votes | % | ±% |
|---|---|---|---|---|
| Progressive Conservative | Denis Ducharme | 5,641 | 70.65% | +12.24% |
| Liberal | Ronald Young | 1,755 | 21.98% | -7.56% |
| New Democratic | Ellen Ulfsten | 313 | 3.92% | |
| Independent | James Skretteberg | 275 | 3.45% | |
| Total | | 7,984 | | |
| Rejected, spoiled and declined | | 44 | | |
| Eligible electors / Turnout | | 16,688 | 48.11% | -0.55% |
| Progressive Conservative hold | | Swing | | +9.90% |

2004 Alberta general election: Bonnyville-Cold Lake
| Party | Candidate | Votes | % | ±% |
|---|---|---|---|---|
| Progressive Conservative | Denis Ducharme | 3,621 | 63.68% | -6.97% |
| Alberta Alliance | Shane Gervais | 973 | 17.11% | |
| Liberal | Lloyd Mildon | 781 | 13.74% | -8.24% |
| New Democratic | Denise Ogonoski | 311 | 5.47% | 1.55% |
| Total | | 5,686 | | |
| Rejected, spoiled, and declined | | 42 | | |
| Eligible electors / Turnout | | 17,704 | 32.35% | -15.76% |
| Progressive Conservative hold | | Swing | | -12.04% |

Alberta provincial government of Ralph Klein
Cabinet post (1)
| Predecessor | Office | Successor |
| Gary Mar | Minister of Community Development; 2006 | 'None (Post Abolished)' |
Other offices
| Preceded by New District | MLA Bonnyville-Cold Lake; 1997–2008 | Succeeded by Genia Leskiw |
