= Donald Hansen =

Canadian politician

Donald Alfred Hansen

Member of the Legislative Assembly of Alberta
- In office August 30, 1971 – March 14, 1979
- Preceded by: Romeo Lamothe
- Succeeded by: Ernie Isley
- Constituency: Bonnyville

Personal details
- Born: October 28, 1924
- Died: April 5, 1981 (aged 56)
- Party: Progressive Conservative

Donald Alfred Hansen (1924-1981) was a provincial level politician from Alberta, Canada. He served as a member of the Legislative Assembly of Alberta from 1971 to 1979 sitting with the governing Progressive Conservative party.

== Political career ==
Hansen ran for a seat to the Alberta Legislature in the 1971 Alberta general election. He won the electoral district of Bonnyville defeating two other candidates in a closely contested race to pick up the seat for the Progressive Conservatives who went on to form government in that election.

Hansen ran for a second term in the 1975 Alberta general election. He won a much larger victory compared to his result in 1971 over three challenging candidates to return to the legislature. He retired at dissolution of the assembly in 1979.
