= Crane Lake (Alberta) =

Lake in Alberta, Canada

- Moore Lake
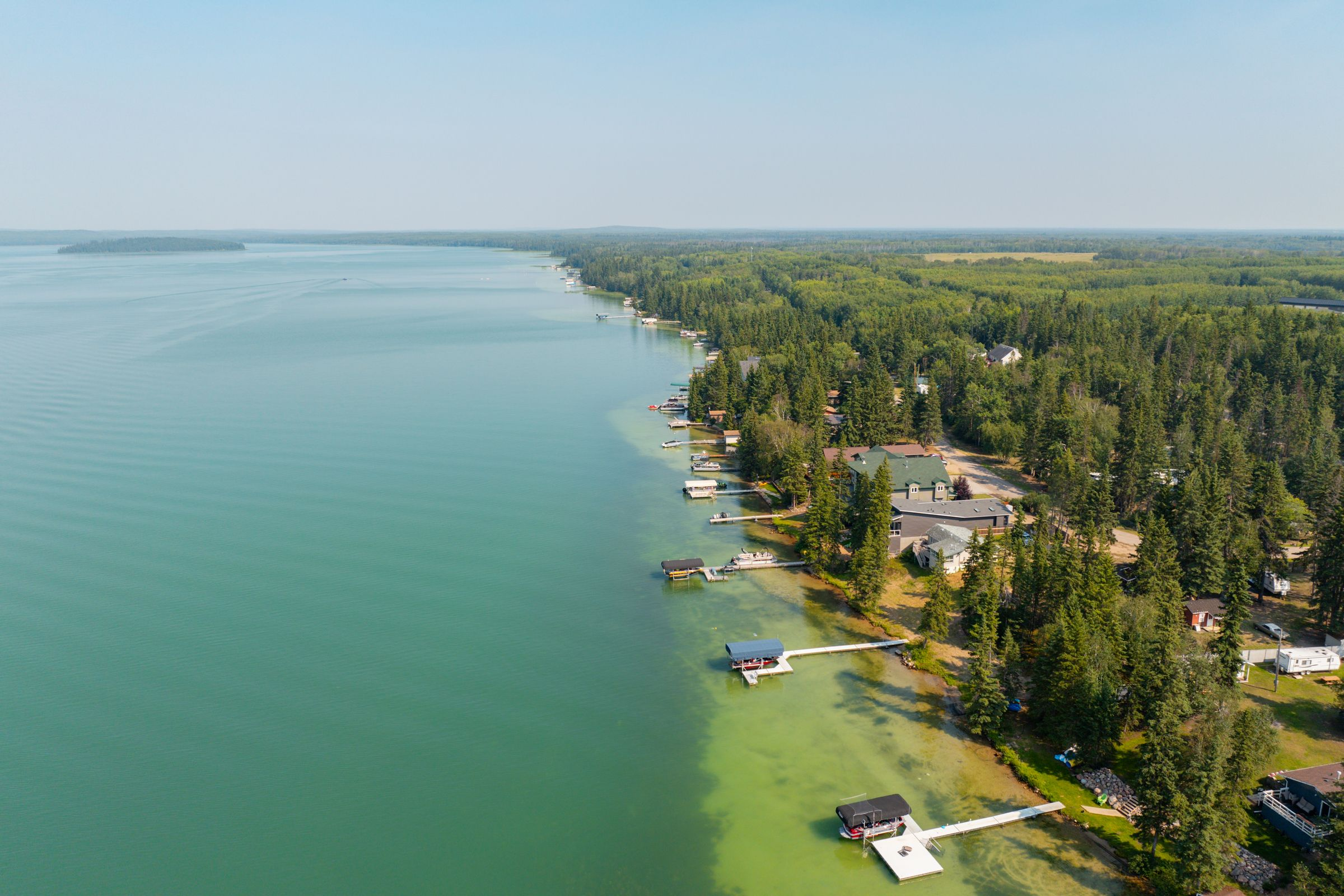
- Aerial view of Crane Lake

- Location within Alberta
- Location: Bonnyville No. 87, Alberta
- Coordinates: 54.517°N 110.517°W
- Type: Lake
- Surface area: 9.28 km² (3.58 sq mi)
- Average depth: 8.3 m (27 ft)
- Max. depth: 26 m (85 ft)
- Surface elevation: 548 m (1,798 ft)
- Islands: 1 (Doris Island)
- Settlements: Happy Hollow

Crane Lake, once Moore Lake, is a lake in Alberta within the Municipal District (MD) of Bonnyville No. 87. Located 25 kilometres (16 mi) northwest of Cold Lake, Alberta, it features the Crane Lake West MD Park and the Crane Lake East MD Park.

== Name ==
The lake was originally named Moore Lake in honour of Dr. Bromley Moore, a former president of the College of Physicians and Surgeons. Despite its official registered name on federal maps, it is almost exclusively referred to as Crane Lake by regional residents and tourism boards.

== Fishing ==
Fish in Crane Lake mainly consist of northern pike and walleye. Other species of fish include yellow perch and burbot. Only catch-and-release fishing is permitted.

== Campgrounds ==
Crane Lake consists of two campgrounds found on its east and west sides. The Crane Lake West MD Park has 24 powered sites and Bodina Resort, which consists of a beach, boat launch, and a general store. The Crane Lake East MD Park has 29 powered sites, a playground, designated swim zone, and a boat dock.
