= Romeo Lamothe =

Canadian politician

Romeo B. Lamothe

Member of the Legislative Assembly of Alberta
- In office November 27, 1961 – August 30, 1971
- Preceded by: Karl Nordstrom
- Succeeded by: Donald Hansen
- Constituency: Bonnyville

Personal details
- Born: October 2, 1914 St. Edouard
- Died: November 23, 1991 (aged 77)
- Party: Social Credit
- Spouse: Paulette Ouimet
- Children: Raymond, Lilliane, and Noella
- Occupation: teacher, businessman, military man and politician

Military service
- Allegiance: Canada
- Branch/service: Royal Canadian Air Force
- Years of service: 1942-1945
- Rank: Flight Lieutenant
- Battles/wars: Second World War

Romeo B. Lamothe (October 2, 1914 - November 23, 1991) was a teacher, military man, and provincial politician from Alberta, Canada. He served in the Royal Canadian Air Force from 1942 to 1945, seeing action in World War II.

Lamothe served as a member of the Legislative Assembly of Alberta from 1961 to 1971 sitting with the Social Credit caucus under Premiers E C Manning and Harry Strom. He did not seek re-election in 1971 .

== Early life ==
Lamothe was born on October 2, 1914, in the hamlet of St. Edouard, Alberta. He took his post secondary education at St. John College and Camrose Normal School and became a teacher.

Lamothe joined the Royal Canadian Air Force in 1942 and saw action in World War II. His career in the Air Force ended in 1945.

== Political career ==
Lamothe ran for a seat to the Alberta Legislature in a by-election held on November 27, 1961, as the Social Credit candidate in the electoral district of Bonnyville. He won the race easily with a landslide majority to hold the seat for his party.

Lamothe ran for a second term in the 1963 Alberta general election. His popular vote decreased but he still won a comfortable plurality to hold the district.

Lamothe ran his third term in office in the 1967 Alberta general election. He held his seat in a hotly contested race against Vic Justik for the second election in a row. Justik ran as a Coalition candidate being nominated by both the Liberals and Progressive Conservatives.

Lamothe retired from the assembly at dissolution in 1971.

== Late life ==
After leaving public office, Lamothe donated the documents from his political career to the Alberta Provincial Archives in 1973. Lamothe died on November 23, 1991.
