= Genia Leskiw =

Canadian politician

MLA for Bonnyville-Cold Lake
- In office March 3, 2008 – May 5, 2015
- Preceded by: Denis Ducharme
- Succeeded by: Scott Cyr

Personal details
- Born: 1950 (age 75–76)
- Party: Progressive Conservative
- Spouse: Ronald Leskiw
- Children: David, Lynna
- Occupation: Middle school teacher (retired)

Eugenia "Genia" Leskiw (née Jereniuk; 1950) is a Canadian politician, who was elected in the 2008 provincial election to represent the electoral district of Bonnyville-Cold Lake in the Legislative Assembly of Alberta, the first woman and the first Ukrainian-Canadian to represent the area. She was a member of the Progressive Conservative caucus and sat on several committees, including Privileges and Elections, the Standing Orders and Printing Committee, and the Special Standing Committee on Members Services.

== Electoral history ==
2008 Alberta general election: Bonnyville-Cold Lake
Party	Candidate	Votes	%	±%
Progressive Conservative	Genia Leskiw	4,437	75.54%	+12.06%
Liberal	Justin Yassoub	698	11.88%	-1.86%
New Democratic	Jason Sloychuk	389	6.62%	+1.15%
Green	Jennifer Brown	350	5.96%	–
Total		5,874	–	–
Rejected, spoiled and declined		49	–	–
Eligible electors / turnout		21,049	28.14%	-4.21%
Progressive Conservative hold		Swing		6.96%
Source(s) The Report on the March 3, 2008 Provincial General Election of the Twenty-seventh Legislative Assembly. Elections Alberta. July 28, 2008. pp. 381–385. "Elections Alberta 2008 General Election". Elections Alberta.

2012 Alberta general election: Bonnyville-Cold Lake
Party	Candidate	Votes	%	±%
Progressive Conservative	Genia Leskiw	4,816	49.09%	-26.45%
Wildrose	Roy Doonanco	4,128	42.08%	–
Liberal	Hubert Rodden	535	5.45%	-6.43%
New Democratic	Luanne Bannister	330	3.36%	-3.26%
Total valid votes		9,809	–	–
Rejected, spoiled, and declined		85	–	–
Eligible electors / turnout		22,170	44.63%	+16.49%
Progressive Conservative hold		Swing		-34.27%
Source(s) Source: "Elections Alberta 2012 General Election". Elections Alberta.
