= Leo Vasseur =

Canadian politician

MLA for Bonnyville
- In office 1993–1997
- Preceded by: Ernie Isley
- Succeeded by: riding dissolved

Personal details
- Born: November 5, 1946 (age 79)
- Party: Liberal
- Occupation: psychologist, school administrator

Leo Vasseur is a politician from Alberta, Canada. He was elected in the 1993 Alberta general election defeating Ernie Isley of the Progressive Conservatives.

He was defeated by Denis Ducharme from the Progressive Conservatives during the 1997 Alberta general election after his district was abolished and he ran in the new Bonnyville-Cold Lake riding. He only served one term in the Legislative Assembly of Alberta.

Vasseur currently serves as regional chair for the northwest region on the Alberta Liberal Party executive.

== Election results ==
1993 Alberta general election: Bonnyville
Party	Candidate	Votes	%	±%
Liberal	Leo Vasseur	4,364	47.2%	+20.7%
Progressive Conservative	Ernie Isley	4,222	45.6%	-4.7%
New Democratic	Agathe Gaulin	666	7.2%	-16.0%
Total valid votes		9,252		
Rejected, spoiled and declined		39		
Eligible electors / Turnout		16,826	55.2%	+10.9%
Liberal gain from Progressive Conservative		Swing		+12.7%

1997 Alberta general election: Bonnyville-Cold Lake
Party	Candidate	Votes	%	±%
Progressive Conservative	Denis Ducharme	4,593	58.41%	+12.81%
Liberal	Leo Vasseur	2,323	29.54%	-17.66%
Social Credit	Robert Kratchmer	948	12.05%	–
Total		7,864	–	–
Rejected, spoiled and declined		11	–	–
Eligible electors / turnout		16,185	48.66%	-6.54%
Progressive Conservative notional gain from Liberal		Swing		+15.24%
Source(s) "Beaver River Official Results 1997 Alberta general election". Alberta Heritage Community Foundation.
