= Moose Lake (Alberta) =

Lake in Alberta, Canada

- lac d'Orignal (French); mōswa sākahikan (Cree)
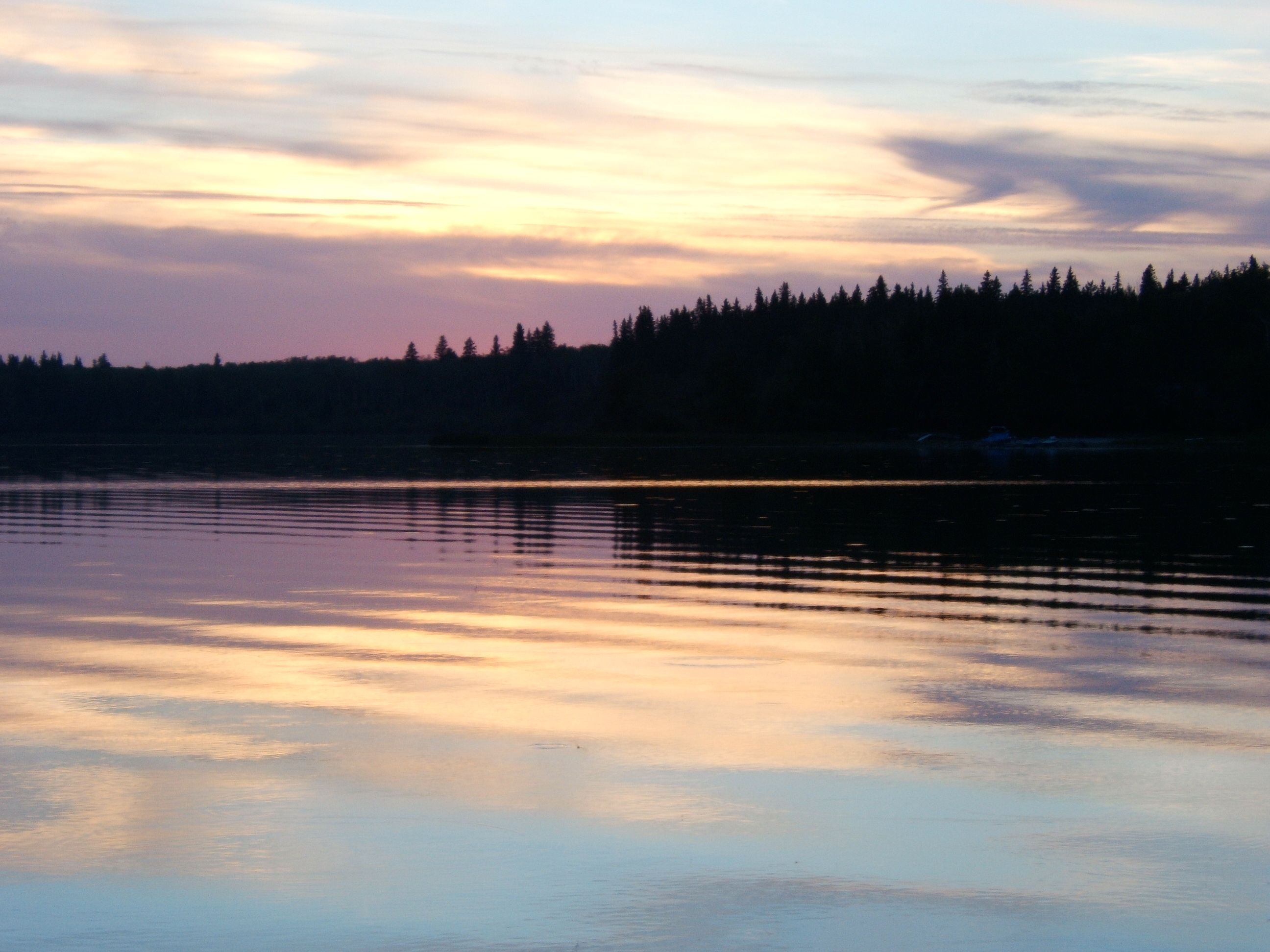
- Sunset in Franchere Bay

- Location within Alberta
- Location: Bonnyville No. 87, Alberta
- Coordinates: 54°15′04″N 110°54′25″W
- Type: eutrophic
- Primary inflows: Thinlake River
- Primary outflows: Mooselake River
- Catchment area: 755 km^{2} (292 sq mi)
- Basin countries: Canada
- Max. length: 14 km (8.7 mi)
- Max. width: 4.4 km (2.7 mi)
- Surface area: 40.8 km^{2} (15.8 sq mi)
- Average depth: 5.6 m (18 ft)
- Max. depth: 19.8 m (65 ft)
- Residence time: 7.5 years
- Surface elevation: 530 m (1,740 ft)
- Settlements: Bonnyville

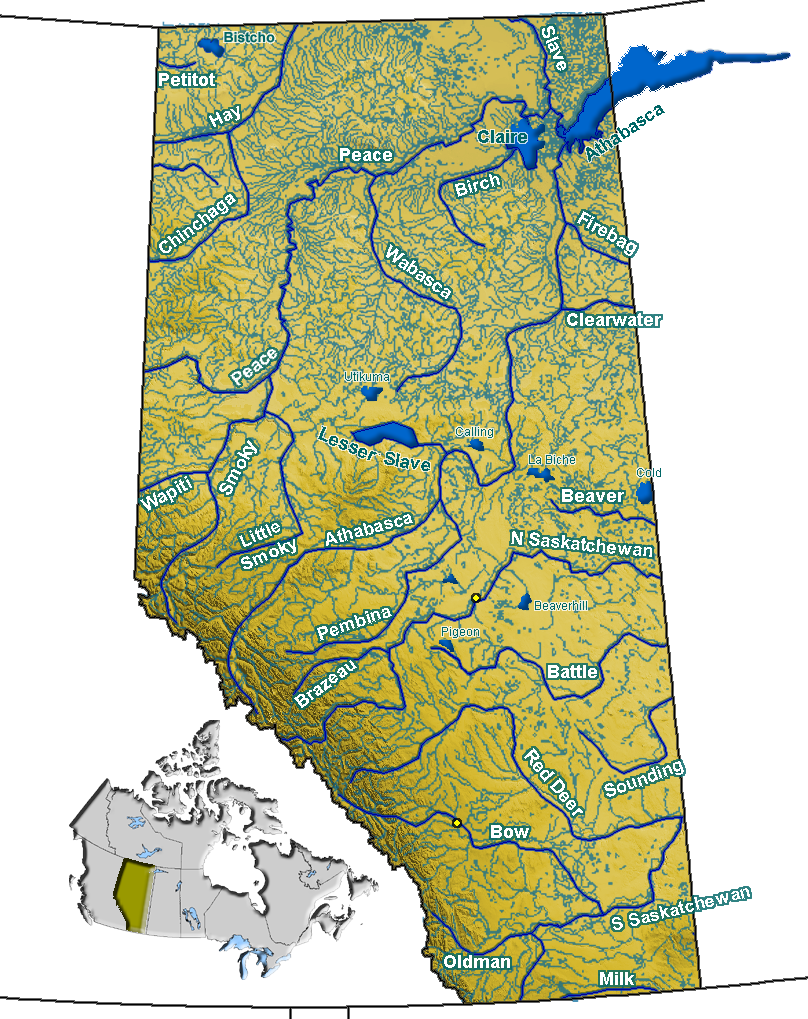
Moose Lake in Alberta

Moose Lake is a relatively small lake in north-eastern Alberta, Canada, located a few kilometres west of the town of Bonnyville. It is fed by the Mooselake River and drains north into the Beaver River (which in turn flows to Hudson Bay).

There is another body of water named Moose Lake, 65 km NW of Fort McKay.

== Name ==
Moose Lake was known to early French-Canadian fur traders as lac d'Orignal, which translates as Moose Lake. This in turn may have been a direct translation of its Cree name of the same meaning, mōswa sākahikan.

== History ==
Around 1768 William Pink passed the mouth of the Mooselake River. In 1789 Angus Shaw of the North West Company built a post on the northwest shore of the lake called Fort Lac L'Orignal or Shaw House. It was close to where the Mooselake River enters Franchere Bay. The river was so shallow that canoes were taken up the river empty and goods portaged overland. It was in good beaver country and within easy reach of Fort George 56 km (35 mi) to the south on the North Saskatchewan. Buffalo pemmican was carried north to the lake and then via the Beaver River to Lac Île-à-la-Crosse to feed the voyageurs on their long journey to Lake Athabasca.

In the 1792–93 season Moose Lake produced 64 of the 392 total packs of beaver produced by the Churchill River Department. In 1798 David Thompson reached the lake from Fort George.

== Geography ==
The major inflow is the Thinlake River, which enters the westernmost point of the lake in Franchere Bay, and the major outflow is the Mooselake River which exits the lake through the northern shore of Franchere Bay. Moose Lake Provincial Park straddles the point separating Franchere Bay and Vezeau Bay and its western edge is the Mooselake River. Most of the shoreline development is on the eastern shores of Vezeau Bay and Bonnyville Beach, comprising several unincorporated communities including Pelican Narrows. There are several Christian summer camps on Franchere Bay, including a Baptist, Pentecostal, and a Roman Catholic camp on the North shore and a Ukrainian Orthodox camp on the South shore. Cyanobacteria (blue-green algae) was found in 2021 lurking in the lake. Alberta Health issued a statement stating not to go in the lake.

== Fishing ==
The lake supports some commercial fishing and recreational fishing is also popular. Sport fish in Moose Lake include Northern Pike, Lake Whitefish, Walleye, and Perch. There is a yearly Walleye tournament in the lake that speaks to the abundance of recreational fishing.
