= Nomination contest =

Political process

A nomination contest, in Canadian politics, is the process by which a political party chooses their candidate for the next general election. Each nomination contest is held by the party's local riding association.

On occasion, a political party's head office may bypass the nomination contest and directly appoint its preferred candidate. Sometimes a canadiate is appointedwith n. This tends to be controversial, however.

Nomination contests are most commonly held during the three to six months immediately preceding an election call, or in the first week of an election campaign.

== See also ==
- Primary election United States version
