= List of Canadian toponyms of Ukrainian origin =

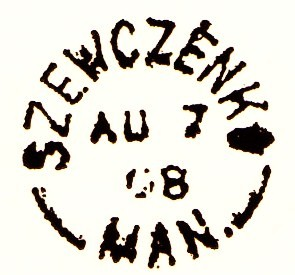
This 1908 postmark is from Szewczenko, Manitoba (now called Vita). The post office's name is a Polonized spelling of the name of Ukraine's national poet, Taras Shevchenko.

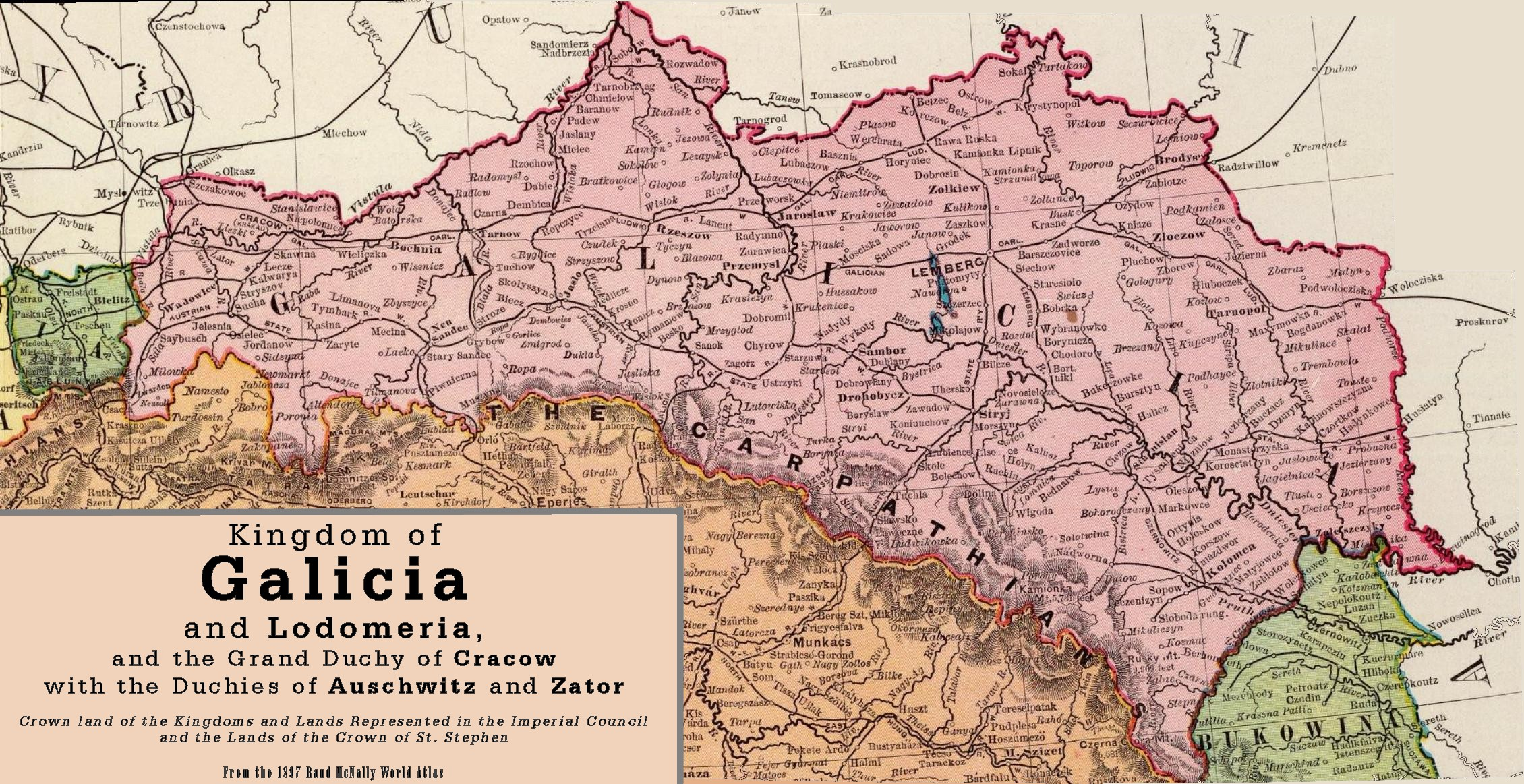
Railways of Galicia before 1897. Place names are in their Polish language form.

The following is a list of place names in Canada (primarily Western Canada) whose name origin comes from the Ukrainian language or places in modern-day Ukraine. Some of these places, especially in Saskatchewan, were named by ethnic Germans from Ukraine.

Most of these places were rural communities without a railway or grain elevator and accessible solely by gravel road; typically consisting only of a church and cemetery, post office, school, and sometimes a community/national hall, a grocery/"general" store or a blacksmith shop.

== Incorporated communities ==
- Chorney Beach, Saskatchewan, a resort beach at Fishing Lake southeast of Wadena; possibly after a local family.
- Chortitz, Saskatchewan, south of Swift Current on Highway 379; German spelling of Khortytsia island, located in the Dnipro river now within the city of Zaporizhzhia, Ukraine - Saskatchewan hamlet named by Plautdietsch-speaking Mennonite immigrants. Mennonites also named two villages in Manitoba, Chortitz and Randolph (originally known as Chortitz) after the same island in Ukraine.
- Lemberg, Saskatchewan, German name for Lviv, named by ethnic Germans from Galicia.
- Myrnam, Alberta, meaning "peace to us"; from the Ukrainian word myr, "peace".
- Odessa, Saskatchewan, after the city of Odesa, village named by ethnic Germans from the neighbouring Bessarabia Governorate of the Russian Empire, which is today split between Moldova and Ukraine.
- Krydor, Saskatchewan, after Peter Krysak and Teodor Lucyk, local settlers.

== Places in cities ==
=== Edmonton ===
- Baturyn, after Baturyn, a historic castle town in northeastern Ukraine.
- Bishop Greschuk Catholic Elementary School, an Edmonton Catholic separate school.
- Bishop Savaryn Catholic Elementary School, an Edmonton Catholic separate school named after Bishop Nicholas Savaryn, the first leader of the Ukrainian Catholic Eparchy of Edmonton.
- Eleniak Road, after Wasyl Eleniak, early pioneer.
- Oleskiw (formerly Wolf Willow Farms), renamed in 1972 after Joseph Oleskiw (1860–1903), professor, writer and promoter of emigration.
- Oleskiw Park, after Joseph Oleskiw (1860–1903), professor, writer and promoter of emigration.
- Ozerna, literally "lake district".
- Pylypow Industrial subdivision, after Ivan Pylypow, early pioneer.
- St. Vladimir Catholic Elementary School, an Edmonton Catholic separate school named after Vladimir the Great.
- Ukrainian Millennium Park (now Primrose Park), for 1989, the one thousandth anniversary of the Baptism of Kiev.
- William Hawrelak Park, after former Edmonton mayor William Hawrelak.

=== Regina ===
- Elsie Mironuck Community School in Regina, a public elementary school.
- Ukrainian Science Park.
- W. S. Hawrylak School in Regina, a public elementary school.

=== Saskatoon ===
- Bishop Filevich Ukrainian Bilingual School in Saskatoon, a Catholic separate school specializing in the study of the Ukrainian language, history and culture.
- Bishop Roborecki School in Saskatoon, a Catholic separate school named after Bishop Andriy Roboretsky, the first leader of the Ukrainian Catholic Eparchy of Saskatoon.
- St. Petro Mohyla Institute, a private college for the study of the Ukrainian language, history and culture, named after St. Petro Mohyla.
- St. Volodymyr School, a Catholic separate school named after St. Volodymyr the Great.

== Rural communities ==
=== Alberta ===
- Bellis, "white woods"; referring to poplars and birch.
- Borsczow, Polonized spelling of Borshchiv.
- Buchach, the Buczacz School District No. 2580, and St. Nicholas Ukrainian Greek Catholic Church (Hlus' Church), Buczacz; from Buchach.
- Halych, from Halych.
- Ipsas, after Ispas.
- Jaroslaw School District No. 1478, the Descent of the Holy Spirit Ukrainian Catholic Church, Jaroslaw; and St. Demitrius Ukrainian Orthodox Church, Jaroslaw; from the Polish name of the city of Jarosław.
- Kolomea and the Kolomea School District No. 1507, phonetic spelling of Kolomyia.
- Lanuke, possibly after a local family.
- Luzan, after Luzhany.
- Mazeppa, the historical English spelling of the last name of Ivan Mazepa.
- New Kiew and the Kiew School District No. 1693, German spelling of Kyiv.
- Prosvita, meaning "enlightenment" in Ukrainian; possibly comes from the name of the Prosvita "Enlightenment" societies which started in Galicia in the 1860s.
- Shalka, after postmaster Matt (Dmytro) Shalka.
- Shandro, named after the Shandro family from "Rus'kyi Banyliv", Chernivtsi Oblast (Bukovina).
- Shepenge, the Szypenitz School District No. 1470, and the Ukrainian Orthodox Church of St. Mary, Szypentiz; after Shypyntsi.
- Shishkovitzi was a locality southwest of Hilliard and southeast of Chipman centering on St. Mary's Holy Dormition Russo-Greek Orthodox Catholic Church, named after Shyshkivtsi.
- Slawa, Polonized spelling of the Ukrainian word "glory" (uk).
- Sniatyn and the Sniatyn School District No. 1605, after Sniatyn. It was originally named Hunka, after a settler in the area from Bukovina.
- Spaca Moskalyk was a locality northwest of Vegreville and northeast of Mundare centered on the Transfiguration of Our Lord Ukrainian Catholic Church, named after both Spas and the Moskalyk family who donated part of their farmland for the church.
- Stry and the Stry School District No. 2508, after Stryi.
- Ukalta, possibly a combination of "Ukrayina" and "Alberta".
- Wasel, Polonized spelling of the Ukrainian common name "Vasyl".
- Wostok, Polonized spelling of the Russian word vostok, "east" - named by Galician Russophile immigrant Theodore (Teodor) Nemirsky.
- Zawale and the Zawale School District No. 1074, Polish name of Zavalya.

=== Manitoba ===
- Chortitz, German spelling of Khortytsia island, named by "Russian" Mennonite immigrants.
- Dneiper (renamed Fishing River), east of Ukraina and northeast of Sifton, named after the Dnipro river.
- Halicz, northwest of Trembowla and north of Ashville near Highway 10 - a Polonized spelling of Halych, a historic Ukrainian city in Ivano-Frankivsk Oblast.
- Horod, north of Elphinstone on Provincial Road 354, near the south boundary of Riding Mountain National Park; the Ukrainian word for "city".
- Jaroslaw, southwest of Hnausa; the Polish name of the city of Jarosław.
- Komarno, the Ukrainian word for "mosquito", possibly named after Komarno.
- Kulish, northwest of Ethelbert; after Panteleimon Kulish.
- Medika, north of Hadashville on Provincial Road 507, named after Medyka.
- Melnice, west of Dunnottar and southwest of Winnipeg Beach, at the junction of Highway 8 and Provincial Road 225 - the Ukrainian word for "windmill".
- Morweena
- Okno, the Ukrainian word for "window".
- Oleskiw, west of Stuartburn on Provincial Road 201; after Joseph Oleskiw.
- Olha, from female given name Olha, possibly named after Princess Olha.
- Ozerna, southeast of Erickson and northeast of Newdale, literally "lake district" in Ukrainian.
- Petlura, at the junction of Provincial Road 366 and Provincial Road 584 near the north boundary of Riding Mountain National Park, named after Ukrainian independence leader Symon Petliura.
- Prawda, a Polonized spelling of the Ukrainian word pravda, "truth".
- Ruthenia, northeast of Angusville and north of the Waywayseecappo townsite on Provincial Road 264, near the south boundary of Riding Mountain National Park, after the Austro-Hungarian name for the Ukrainian territories of Galicia, Bukovina, and Carpathian Ruthenia.
- Seech, east of Olha and northwest of Elphinstone, near the south boundary of Riding Mountain National Park; a phonetic misspelling of the Ukrainian word sich; after the Zaporizhian Sich.
- Senkiw, northwest of Roseau River and southwest of Rosa; possibly after a local family.
- Sirko, south of Sundown, possibly after Ivan Sirko.
- Szewczenko, a Polonized spelling of Taras Shevchenko's last name.
- Trembowla, northwest of Dauphin on Provincial Road 491; the Polish spelling of Terebovlia.
- Ukraina, a phonetic spelling of "Ukraine" in the Ukrainian language.
- Vidir, northwest of Arborg on Provincial Road 233
- Zbaraz, a phonetic spelling of Zbarazh.
- Zelana, northeast of Ukraina and east of Ethelbert on Provincial Road 269; a misspelling of the Ukrainian word uk, meaning "green".
- Zelena, northeast of Makaroff and west of the junction of Provincial Road 594 and Highway 83, the Ukrainian word for "green".
- Zhoda, the Ukrainian word for "harmony".
- Zoria, east of Sifton off Highway 10; the Ukrainian word for "dawn".

=== Ontario ===
- Odessa is a settlement in Loyalist Township - originally named "Millcreek", was renamed by its postmaster to commemorate the British naval bombardment of Odesa, Ukraine during the Crimean War.

=== Saskatchewan ===
- Adamiwka School District No. 1994 and the Ukrainian Catholic Church of the Descent of the Holy Ghost, Adamiwka; both southeast of Rosthern, Saskatchewan - after "Adamivka", now in Jarosław County, Poland.
- Antoniwka was a locality north of Canora, Saskatchewan centred on the Ukrainian Catholic parish of the Assumption; named after Antonivka, Chortkiv Raion, Ternopil Oblast.
- "Belyk's" was a locality north of Borden, Saskatchewan centered on the "Ivan Franko National Home" - built on Yurko Belyk's farmland - and the Redberry Park rural post office; also the location of the Assumption of St. Mary Ukrainian Orthodox church.
- Beresina, Saskatchewan, northeast of Churchbridge; German spelling of "Berezyna" (now Rozdil in Mykolaiv Raion), Lviv Oblast - Saskatchewan post office named by ethnic Germans from Galicia.
- Bobulynci was a locality southwest of Rose Valley, Saskatchewan centered on the Ukrainian Catholic parish of The Transfiguration - named after Bobulyntsi, Buchach Raion, Ternopil Oblast.
- Bodnari (or "Kolo Bodnariv") was a locality northeast of Vonda, Saskatchewan named after Teodor Bodnar, who donated part of his farmland to the Ukrainian Catholic parish of Saints Peter and Paul for a church.
- Buchach was a locality near Hazel Dell, Saskatchewan centered on the Ukrainian Catholic Church of the Patronage of the Blessed Virgin Mary; named after Buchach, Buchach Raion, Ternopil Oblast.
- Bukowina, Saskatchewan, south of Yellow Creek; German/Polish spelling of the Austrian crownland of Bukovina - part of which is now in Chernivtsi Oblast, Ukraine. Named by Bukovinian immigrant and postmaster John (Ivan) Fessiuk.
- Byrtnyky was a locality between Kelvington and Endeavour, Saskatchewan named after one of three places named "Byrtnyky" in Lviv Oblast.
- Dmytruk Lake, north of Cree Lake; after Peter Dmytruk of Wynyard, Saskatchewan (aka "Pierre le Canadien"), a member of the Royal Canadian Air Force who served with the French Resistance after being shot down near Paris in 1943.
- Dneiper, Saskatchewan, north of Rhein, after the Dnipro river.
- Dneister, Saskatchewan (renamed "Hamton"), northeast of Rhein on Highway 650; after the Dniester river.
- Dobrowody, Saskatchewan and the Dobrowody School District No. 2637, both northeast of Rama, Saskatchewan - a Ukrainian phrase meaning "good water"; after a village of the same name ("Dobrovody") in Pidhaitsi Raion, Ternopil Oblast, Ukraine.
- Drobot, Saskatchewan, north of Theodore, after Thomas Drobot - postmaster from 1909 to 1917.
- Halyary, Saskatchewan, southwest of Preeceville - a Postmaster General/Government of Canada misspelling of "Halychy".
- Halycry School District No. 2835, also southwest of Preeceville, Saskatchewan - a Department of Education misspelling of "Halychy".
- Havryliuky was a locality south of Prud'homme, Saskatchewan named after Nicholas Hawryluk (Nykola Havryliuk), who donated part of his farmland for Sacred Heart of Jesus Ukrainian Catholic Church.
- Hryhoriw School District No. 2390 and the Ukrainian Catholic parish of St. Demetrius, Hryhoriw; both south of Preeceville, Saskatchewan - after Hryhoriv, Buchach Raion, Ternopil Oblast.
- Hory (also called Carpenter-Hory) was a locality southwest of Wakaw, Saskatchewan centering on the Ukrainian Catholic parish of The Ascension of Our Lord Jesus Christ - after the Ukrainian word for "mountains" ("hori").
- Janow School District No. 2842 and Janow Corners, Saskatchewan, both south of Meath Park; after a village called "Yaniv" (now Ivano-Frankove), in Yavoriv Raion, Lviv Oblast, Ukraine.
- Kalyna, Saskatchewan, and the Kalyna School District No. 3945, both south of Meath Park, Saskatchewan - after the Ukrainian word for the "highbush cranberry".
- Kiev was a locality southwest of Rose Valley, Saskatchewan centered on a Ukrainian Orthodox Church; named after the capital city of Ukraine.
- Kobzar School District No. 3597 and the Ukrainian Orthodox Church of the Holy Ascension, Arran-Kobzar; both south of Arran, Saskatchewan - after the book of poems by Taras Shevchenko.
- Kolo Pidskal'noho (or "Pidskalny's") was a locality west of Cudworth, Saskatchewan named after Ivan Pidskalny, who donated part of his farmland to the Ukrainian Catholic parish of St. Demetrius for a church.
- Kolo Solomyanoho was a locality west of Cudworth, Saskatchewan named after Ivan Solomyany, who donated part of his farmland for the (unspecified) Ukrainian Church of the Holy Transfiguration.
- Kowalowka School District No. 1739 and the Ukrainian Catholic Church of The Transfiguration, Kovalivka; both northeast of Canora, Saskatchewan - after Kovalivka, Buchach Raion, Ternopil Oblast.
- Krasne, Saskatchewan, west of Wishart, the Ukrainian word for "beautiful"; after a village in Pidvolochysk Raion, Ternopil Oblast, Ukraine.
- Krim was a locality south of Aberdeen, Saskatchewan and is the German spelling of the Crimean peninsula - named by "Russian" Mennonites from the Taurida Governorate of the Russian Empire, now Ukraine.
- Kulykiv was a locality north of Invermay, Saskatchewan named after Kulykiv, Zhovkva Raion, Lviv Oblast.
- Kvitka, Saskatchewan, south of Jedburgh, after Gregory (Hryhory) Kvitka (1778–1843), Ukrainian novelist.
- Kyziv-Tiaziv, Saskatchewan, south of Rama, after Tiaziv, Tysmenytsia Raion, Ivano-Frankivsk Oblast.
- Laniwci, Saskatchewan, and the Laniwci School District No. 2300, both west of Alvena, Saskatchewan - Polonized spelling of Lanivtsi, Borshchiv Raion, Ternopil Oblast.
- Leskiw Lake, southwest of Creighton, Saskatchewan; after Anthony Leskiw of Saskatoon, "lost at sea in October 1940 while serving aboard SS Whitford Point, torpedoed in the north Atlantic by a German submarine".
- Malonek, Saskatchewan, and the Malonek School District No. 3669, both northeast of Pelly, Saskatchewan; perhaps after "Malynivka" - now Malinówka, Brzozów County, Poland.
- New Yaroslau, the name of a Ukrainian block settlement northeast of Yorkton, Saskatchewan; after the ancient city of Yaroslav - now in Jarosław County, Poland.
- Orolow, Saskatchewan (also called "Teshliuk's"), south of Krydor - Polonized misspelling of Ordiv, Radekhiv Raion, Lviv Oblast.
- Paniowce, Saskatchewan (renamed "Swan Plain"), north of Norquay on Highway 8 - Polish name of Panivtsi Zelene, Borshchiv Raion, Ternopil Oblast.
- Rak, Saskatchewan, northeast of Vonda on Highway 41 - after Joseph Rak from Lanivtsi, Borshchiv Raion, Ternopil Oblast.
- Rebryna was a locality northeast of Hafford, Saskatchewan centered on the "Redberry Ivan Franko Library and Hall", named after Paul (Pavlo) Rebryna.
- Sich School District No. 3454, the Sich community hall and the Ukrainian Catholic parish of St. Michael, "Krydor Sich"; all west of Blaine Lake, Saskatchewan - after the fortresses of the Ukrainian Cossacks.
- Sokal, Saskatchewan, and the Sokal School District No. 1955, both west of Wakaw, Saskatchewan - named after Sokal, Sokal Raion, Lviv Oblast.
- Stanislavtsi was a locality south of Foam Lake, Saskatchewan named after Stanislaviv (now Ivano-Frankivsk), Ukraine; also the location of the "Michael Hrushewski" community hall.
- Tarnopol, Saskatchewan, Polonized spelling of Ternopil, Ternopil Raion, Ternopil Oblast.
- Vasyliv (or "Kolo Vasyleva") was a locality south of Buchanan, Saskatchewan centered on the Ukrainian Catholic parish of Saints Constantine and Helena; named after "N. Wasyliw".
- Vorobceve was a locality just west of Krydor, Saskatchewan centered on the Ukrainian Catholic Church of St. Demetrius; named after the Worobetz family.
- Walawa, Saskatchewan, west of Theodore; Polonized spelling of "Valiava" - now in Przemyśl County, Poland.
- Welechko (or "Bilya Velychka") was a locality south of Hafford, Saskatchewan, named after Ivan Welechko - who donated part of his farmland to the Ukrainian Catholic parish of The Presentation for a church; also the location of the "Taras Shewchenko" community hall.
- Whitkow, Saskatchewan, west of Mayfair on Highway 378, is an Anglo-Polonized spelling of Vytkiv, Radekhiv Raion, Lviv Oblast.

== Other ==
- Dochylo Road at Christopher Lake, Saskatchewan, after a local family.
- Hryciw Road near Prud'homme, Saskatchewan, also after a local family.
- "Krassna" was a parish of German Roman Catholics south of Leader, Saskatchewan - German spelling of Krasne, Izmail Raion, Odesa Oblast.
- St. Volodymyr Ukrainian Park, Saskatchewan, a campground owned by the Saskatoon branch of the Ukrainian Catholic Brotherhood of Canada; featuring a small Ukrainian Catholic church dedicated to St. Volodymyr.

== Rural schools ==
=== Alberta ===
- Bavilla School District No. 1477, part of the community of Wasel west of Hamlin, Alberta near the North Saskatchewan River - ?.
- Berhometh School District No. 1499, northeast of Hairy Hill, Alberta - a misspelling of Berehomet, Vyzhnytsia Raion, Chernivtsi Oblast (Bukovina).
- Bohdan School District No. 3097, south of Myrnam, Alberta - from the male given name Bohdan ("God-given"); possibly after Hetman Bohdan Khmelnytsky.
- Borowich School District No. 2052, north of Willingdon, Alberta - possibly after a local family.
- Brody School District No. 1782, northeast of Mundare, Alberta - after Brody, Brody Raion, Lviv Oblast.
- Bukowina School District No. 1162, northeast of Andrew, Alberta; German/Polish spelling of the Austrian crownland of Bukovina - part of which is now in Chernivtsi Oblast, Ukraine.
- Chernowci School No. 1456, northeast of Wostok, Alberta - Polonized misspelling of the city of Chernivtsi, Ukraine.
- Chornik School District No. 2343, northeast of Musidora, Alberta - possibly after a local family.
- Czahar School District No. 2322, southwest of Willingdon, Alberta - Polonized spelling of the village of Chahor; now a part of the city of Chernivtsi, Ukraine.
- Ispas School District No. 2765, southeast of Hamlin and northwest of Duvernay, Alberta on the south side of the North Saskatchewan River - after Ispas, Vyzhnytsia Raion, Chernivtsi Oblast (Bukovina).
- Koluz School District No. 1631, east of Chipman, Alberta - a Polonized misspelling of Kalush, Kalush Raion, Ivano-Frankivsk Oblast.
- Kotzman School District No. 2325, northeast of Smoky Lake, Alberta - the German spelling of Kitsman, Chernivtsi Raion, Chernivtsi Oblast (Bukovina).
- Krasnahora School District No. 2613, south of Musidora, Alberta - a Ukrainian phrase meaning "beautiful hill".
- Krasne School District No. 2245, northeast of Lavoy and south of Two Hills, Alberta - the Ukrainian word for "beautiful".
- Kysylew School District No. 1467, northeast of Wostok, Alberta near the Limestone Creek - a Polonized misspelling of Kyseliv, Chernivtsi Raion, Chernivtsi Oblast (Bukovina).
- Leszniw School District No. 2621, south of Morecambe and northeast of Innisfree, Alberta - Polonized spelling of Leshniv, Brody Raion, Lviv Oblast.
- Lwiw School District No. 1474, southeast of St. Michael and northeast of Chipman, Alberta on Highway 29 - Polonized spelling of the city of Lviv, Ukraine.
- Luzan School District No. 2113, halfway between Musidora, Alberta and the North Saskatchewan River - after Luzhany, Chernivtsi Raion, Chernivtsi Oblast (Bukovina).
- Miroslowna School District No. 2528, northeast of Innisfree, Alberta - Polonized spelling of the Ukrainian word "miroslavna", meaning "Glorified Peace".
- Molodia School District No. 1486, south of Andrew and north of Mundare, Alberta at the junction of Highway 29 and Secondary Highway 855 - after Molodiia, Chernivtsi Raion, Chernivtsi Oblast (Bukovina).
- Myrnam School District No. 2219, northwest of the modern townsite of Myrnam, Alberta - "peace to us"; from the Ukrainian word myr, "peace".
- Nizir School District No. 2179, east of Two Hills, southeast of Duvernay and northwest of Musidora, Alberta - ?.
- Oleskow School District No. 1612, southeast of Mundare, Alberta and west of Vegreville; after Joseph Oleskiw (1860–1903) - author of the pamphlets "On Free Lands" (Pro Vilni Zemli, spring 1895), and "On Emigration" (O emigratsiy, December 1895).
- Paraskevia School District No. 1487, northeast of Hilliard and north of Mundare, Alberta on Secondary Highway 855 - possibly after one of the saints named Paraskevi.
- Peremysl School District No. 2944, southeast of Radway, Alberta on the south side of the North Saskatchewan River on Secondary Highway 831 - a phonetic misspelling of the Ukrainian name ("Peremyshl") for Przemyśl, Poland.
- Podola School District No. 2065, south of Hilliard and west of Mundare, Alberta near the Beaverhill Creek - Polonized spelling of the Ukrainian region of Podillia.
- Pobeda School District No. 1604, southeast of Two Hills and west of Morecambe, Alberta - ?.
- Proswita School District No. 1563, northeast of Star and northwest of St. Michael, Alberta off Highway 45 - Polonized spelling of the Ukrainian word for "enlightenment"; possibly after the Prosvita Society of Galicia.
- Provischena School District No. 1476, south of Bellis, Alberta near the North Saskatchewan River - possibly after the Ukrainian word for "prophecy" (provishchennya).
- Pruth School Division No. 2064, northwest of Warwick, Alberta - after the Prut river in Chernivtsi Oblast (Bukovina).
- Radymno School District No. 2942, part of the rural community of Leeshore east of Redwater, Alberta on the south side of the North Saskatchewan River - after the town of Radymno, now in Jarosław County, Poland.
- Russia School District No. 2069, south of Musidora, Alberta; from school board confusion over Rusyny / Ruthenian vs. Russki / Russian.
- Ruthenia School District No. 2408, southeast of Smoky Lake and southwest of Bellis, Alberta - after the Austro-Hungarian name for the Ukrainian territories of Galicia, Bukovina, and Carpathian Ruthenia (now Transcarpathian Oblast).
- Shandro School District No. 1438, halfway between Willingdon, Alberta and the North Saskatchewan River - after the Shandro family from "Rus'kyi Banyliv", Chernivtsi Oblast (Bukovina).
- Sheptycki School District No. 2920, southeast of Waskatenau, Alberta on the south side of the North Saskatchewan River - possibly after The Venerable Metropolitan Andrey Sheptytsky (1865–1944).
- Sherentz School District No. 2614, south of Beauvallon and southwest of Myrnam, Alberta - possibly after Shyrivtsi, currently in Dniester Raion, Chernivtsi Oblast (Bukovina).
- Sich School District No. 1595, northeast of Warwick, Alberta - after the fortresses of the Ukrainian Cossacks.
- Skeskowicz School District No. 1801, southwest of Willingdon, Alberta - ?.
- Skowiatyn School District No. 2483, northwest of Wostok, Alberta near the North Saskatchewan River - after Skoviatyn, Borshchiv Raion, Ternopil Oblast.
- Slawa School District No. 2400, south of the old townsite of Slawa, Alberta - Polonized spelling of the Ukrainian word "glory" (slava).
- Stanislawow School District No. 1485, northeast of Mundare, Alberta - Polish spelling of the town of Stanislaviv, now Ivano-Frankivsk, Ukraine.
- Svit School District No. 1491, east of Chipman and northeast of Hilliard, Alberta - the Ukrainian word for "the world" or "light".
- Svoboda School District No. 1479, part of the rural community of Skaro northwest of St. Michael, Alberta at the junction of Highway 45 and Secondary Highway 831 - the Ukrainian word for "liberty".
- Toporoutz School District No. 1935, east of Warspite and southwest of Smoky Lake, Alberta - German spelling of Toporivtsi, Chernivtsi Raion, Chernivtsi Oblast (Bukovina).
- Ukraina School District No. 1672, southeast of Hilliard and southwest of Mundare, Alberta - phonetic spelling of "Ukraine" in the Ukrainian language.
- Uhryn School District No. 2409, southeast of Beauvallon and southwest of Myrnam, Alberta - possibly after one of nine places named "Uhryniv" in Galicia.
- Vladymir School District No. 1217, northwest of Mundare, Alberta - after district pioneer Vladymir Svarich (Volodymyr Zvarych).
- Wolie School District No. 2591, west of Warwick, Alberta on the south shore of Bens Lake - Polonized misspelling of the Ukrainian word "freedom" (volya).
- Zaporoze School District No. 2246, northeast of Lavoy, Alberta - a phonetic spelling of "Zaporizhzhia"; after the Zaporizhian Host of Ukrainian Cossacks.
- Zhoda School District No. 1498, southeast of Willingdon and west of Hairy Hill, Alberta - the Ukrainian word for "harmony".
- Zora School District No. 2487, northwest of the modern townsite of Slawa, Alberta - possibly a misspelling of the Ukrainian word for "dawn" (zoria).

=== Saskatchewan ===
- Bereziw School District No. 3030 (changed to "Slawa School"), south of Hafford, Saskatchewan; after the district (povit) of "Bereziv" - now Brzozów County, Poland.
- Bogucz School District No. 1743, southeast of Canora, Saskatchewan; possibly after "Bohusa" - now Bogusza, Nowy Sącz County, Poland.
- Bohdan School District No. 3511, east of Mayfair, Saskatchewan; from the male given name Bohdan ("God-given") - possibly after Bohdan Khmelnytsky.
- Bridok School District No. 1765, south of Canora, Saskatchewan, after Bridok, Chernivtsi Raion, Chernivtsi Oblast (Bukovina).
- Bukowina School District No. 2012, southeast of Wakaw, Saskatchewan; German/Polish spelling of the Austrian crownland of Bukovina - part of which is now in Chernivtsi Oblast, Ukraine.
- Cheremosz School District No. 4004, north of Endeavour, Saskatchewan, after the Cheremosh river that separated Galicia and Bukovina.
- Crimea School District No. 4195, southwest of Eatonia, Saskatchewan, after the peninsula in the Black Sea - School named by ethnic Germans from the Taurida Governorate of the Russian Empire, now Ukraine.
- Czernawka School District No. 1712, north of MacNutt, Saskatchewan; misspelling of the Polish name of "Cherniavka" - now Czerniawka, in Jarosław County, Poland.
- Dnister School District No. 1635, southwest of Canora, Saskatchewan, after the Dniester river.
- Dobraniwka School District No. 2608, southeast of Rosthern, Saskatchewan; a Polonized variation of the Ukrainian phrase for "extremely good" ("dobraniv").
- Drahomanow School District No. 2501, southeast of Prud'homme, Saskatchewan, after Mykhailo Drahomanov (1841–1895).
- Fedoruk School District No. 2342, southwest of Veregin, Saskatchewan, after school trustee Nicoli (Mykola) Fedoruk.
- Fosti School District No. 1700, south of Sheho, Saskatchewan, after school board treasurer John (Ivan) Fosti.
- Franko School District No. 1740, east of Canora, Saskatchewan, after Ivan Franko (1856–1916).
- Halicz School District No. 3204, northwest of Wishart, Saskatchewan; Polonized spelling of the historic Ukrainian city in Ivano-Frankivsk Oblast - named by a "Mr. Bodnarchuk".
- Horodenka School District No. 1845, west of Wakaw, Saskatchewan, after Horodenka, Kolomyia Raion, Ivano-Frankivsk Oblast.
- Horosziwci School District No. 2433 (renamed "War End School"), west of Theodore, Saskatchewan; possibly after "Horokhivtsi" - now in Przemyśl County, Poland.
- Husiatyn School District No. 791 (renamed "Claytonville School"), south of Meath Park, Saskatchewan, after Husiatyn, Husiatyn Raion, Ternopil Oblast.
- Jablonow School District No. 1672 (renamed "Wroxton School") at Wroxton, Saskatchewan - Polonized spelling of Yabloniv, Kolomyia Raion, Ivano-Frankivsk Oblast.
- Jarema School District No. 1731, north of Calder, Saskatchewan, possibly after the town of Yaremche in Ivano-Frankivsk Oblast.
- Kaminka School District No. 1632 at Tway, Saskatchewan, after "Kaminka"/Kamianka-Buzka, Kamianka-Buzka Raion, Lviv Oblast.
- Kiev School District No. 1728 (originally "Kyjiw"), north of Alvena, Saskatchewan - after the capital city of Ukraine.
- Kitzman Scholl District No. 2400, northeast of Rhein, Saskatchewan, after Kitsman, Chernivtsi Raion, Chernivtsi Oblast (Bukovina).
- Kolomyia School District No. 1878, west of Wakaw, Saskatchewan, after Kolomyia, Kolomyia Raion, Ivano-Frankivsk Oblast.
- Krasne School District No. 3058, south of Hafford, Saskatchewan - the Ukrainian word for "beautiful".
- Krasny School District No. 1121, southwest of Sheho, Saskatchewan - also after the Ukrainian word for "beautiful".
- Larisa School District No. 5186, west of Wishart, Saskatchewan, after Larysa Kosach-Kvitka (Lesia Ukrainka, 1871–1913).
- Lodi School District No. 3509, north of Okla, Saskatchewan, the Ukrainian word for "ice".
- Luzan School District No. 255, south of Veregin, Saskatchewan, after Luzhany, Chernivtsi Raion, Chernivtsi Oblast (Bukovina).
- Lysenko School District No. 494, at Insinger, Saskatchewan, after Mykola Lysenko (1842–1912).
- Mazeppa School District No. 2860, southeast of Canora, Saskatchewan, after Hetman Ivan Mazepa.
- Monastyr School District No. 2328, north of Buchanan, Saskatchewan, after Monastyryska, Monastyryska Raion, Ternopil Oblast.
- Mostetz School District No. 1734, northwest of Calder, Saskatchewan, Germanic spelling of "Mostyshche"/Mostyska, Mostyska Raion, Lviv Oblast.
- Nauka School District No. 3059, south of Hafford, Saskatchewan - the Ukrainian word for "learning".
- Nichlava School District No. 1877 (formerly "Heuboden School"), southeast of Rosthern, Saskatchewan, after the Nichlava river in Ternopil Oblast.
- Odessa School District No. 2327, south of Tramping Lake, Saskatchewan; after the city of Odesa, Ukraine - School named by ethnic Germans from the neighbouring Bessarabia Governorate of the Russian Empire, which is today split between Moldova and Ukraine.
- Oleskow School District No. 540, north of Rhein, Saskatchewan, after Joseph Oleskiw (1860–1903) - author of the pamphlets "On Free Lands" (Pro Vilni Zemli, spring 1895), and "On Emigration" (O emigratsiy, December 1895).
- Orolow School District No. 2392, south of Krydor, Saskatchewan - a Department of Education misspelling of Ordiv, Radekhiv Raion, Lviv Oblast.
- Osin School District No. 3598, north of Arran, Saskatchewan, the Ukrainian word for "autumn".
- Oukraina School District No. 2402, west of Krydor, Saskatchewan - a Department of Education phonetic spelling of Ukrayina (Ukraine).
- Ozeriany School District No. 2722 (renamed "Carpathian School"), south of Cudworth, Saskatchewan - the Ukrainian word for "from the lake"; after one of four places named "Ozeriany" in Galicia.
- Paniowce School District No. 291 (renamed "Swan Plain School"), north of Norquay, Saskatchewan on Highway 8 - Polish name of Panivtsi Zelene, Borshchiv Raion, Ternopil Oblast.
- Paseika School District No. 2419, south of Arran, Saskatchewan - a Department of Education phonetic spelling of "pasika"; a Ukrainian word for "beehive" or "apiary".
- Podole School District No. 3227, northeast of Prince Albert, Saskatchewan - the Polish spelling of the Ukrainian region of Podolia.
- Podolia School District No. 2384, northeast of Arran, Saskatchewan - after the Ukrainian/Moldovan region of Podolia.
- Pohorlowtz School District No. 2578, southwest of Sheho, Saskatchewan - Germanic misspelling of Pohoril'tsi, Peremyshliany Raion, Lviv Oblast.
- Poltawa School District No. 2335 (renamed "Carpenter School"), northeast of Cudworth, Saskatchewan; Polonized spelling of the city of Poltava, Ukraine - probably after the famous battle in 1709.
- Probizna School District No. 1724 (renamed "Geddes School"), northeast of Wroxton, Saskatchewan, after Probizhna, Chortkiv Raion, Ternopil Oblast.
- Prosvita School District No. 3457, west of Mayfair, Saskatchewan, after the Prosvita Society in Galicia.
- Radimno School District No. 2682, southeast of Willowbrook, Saskatchewan; after the town of Radymno, now in Jarosław County, Poland.
- Rak School District No. 3244, northeast of Vonda, Saskatchewan on Highway 41 - after Joseph Rak from Lanivtsi, Borshchiv Raion, Ternopil Oblast.
- Rus School District No. 2584, south of Hafford, Saskatchewan, after Kievan Rus'.
- Ruthenia School District No. 404, southwest of Cudworth, Saskatchewan; after the Austro-Hungarian name for the Ukrainian territories of Galicia, Bukovina, and Carpathian Ruthenia (now Transcarpathian Oblast).
- Sambor School District No. 4057, northeast of Dysart, Saskatchewan; Polonized spelling of Sambir, Sambir Raion, Lviv Oblast - School named by ethnic Germans from Galicia.
- Scalat School District No. 1623, southeast of Canora, Saskatchewan - misspelling of Skalat, Pidvolochysk Raion, Ternopil Oblast.
- Siczynski School District No. 2513, near Meacham, Saskatchewan - Polonized spelling of the last name of Ukrainian composer and conductor Denys Sichynsky (1865–1909).
- Skala School District No. 2712, west of Cudworth, Saskatchewan - after Skala-Podilska, Borshchiv Raion, Ternopil Oblast.
- Slawa School District No. 3030 (formerly "Bereziw School"), south of Hafford, Saskatchewan - Polonized spelling of the Ukrainian word "glory" (slava).
- Sniatyn School District No. 1729, west of Wakaw, Saskatchewan, after Sniatyn, Sniatyn Raion, Ivano-Frankivsk Oblast.
- Stanisloff School District No. 3105, south of Foam Lake, Saskatchewan - a Department of Education phonetic misspelling of "Stanislav", after Stanislaviv (now Ivano-Frankivsk), Ukraine.
- Stawchan School District No. 1826, north of Rhein, Saskatchewan - a Polonized misspelling of Stavchany, Horodok Raion, Lviv Oblast.
- Stryj School District No. 3201, north of Goodeve, Saskatchewan - German/Polish spelling of Stryi, Stryi Raion, Lviv Oblast.
- Svoboda School District No. 1704, northwest of Alvena, Saskatchewan - the Ukrainian word for "liberty".
- Taras School District No. 4880, north of Gronlid, Saskatchewan, after Taras Shevchenko.
- Toporoutz School District No. 1666 (renamed "Chaucer School"), north of Calder, Saskatchewan - German spelling of Toporivtsi, Chernivtsi Raion, Chernivtsi Oblast (Bukovina).
- Torsk School District No. 1713, east of Calder, Saskatchewan - after Torske, Zalishchyky Raion, Ternopil Oblast.
- Vasloutz School District No. 2642, south of Buchanan, Saskatchewan - Germanic misspelling of Vasylkivtsi, Husiatyn Raion, Ternopil Oblast.
- Verenczanka School District No. 264 (renamed "New Canadian School"), east of Rhein, Saskatchewan - Polonized spelling of Verenchanka, Chernivtsi Raion, Chernivtsi Oblast (Bukovina).
- Vesna School District No. 736, southeast of Arran, Saskatchewan, the Ukrainian word for "spring (season)".
- Verbowska School District No. 1737, north of MacNutt, Saskatchewan; a Polonized misspelling of Verbivka, Borshchiv Raion, Ternopil Oblast.
- Vladimir School District No. 2193, west of Alvena, Saskatchewan, after St. Volodymyr the Great.
- Wasileff School District No. 1692 (renamed "Yemen School"), west of Insinger, Saskatchewan - an Anglo-Polonized spelling of Vasyliv, Chernivtsi Raion, Chernivtsi Oblast (Bukovina).
- Whitkow School District No. 4508 and Whitkow Hamlet School District No. 5118, both west of Mayfair, Saskatchewan on Highway 378; an Anglo-Polonized spelling of Vytkiv, Radekhiv Raion, Lviv Oblast.
- Wisnia School District No. 2870, southeast of Veregin, Saskatchewan - Polish name of the Vyshnia river in Lviv Oblast.
- Wolia School District No. 3503, southwest of Glaslyn, Saskatchewan - Polonized spelling of the Ukrainian word "freedom" (volya).
- Wolna School District No. 3503, east of Rama, Saskatchewan - Polonized spelling of the Ukrainian word "free" (vilna).
- Wysla School District No. 4106, southwest of Canora, Saskatchewan - misspelling of the Ukrainian word (Vysla) for the Vistula river.
- Zamok School District No. 784, south of Meath Park, Saskatchewan, after Zamok, Zhovkva Raion, Lviv Oblast.
- Zaporoze School District No. 3188, west of Krydor, Saskatchewan - a Department of Education phonetic spelling of "Zaporizhzhia"; after the Zaporizhian Host of Ukrainian Cossacks.
- Zayacz School District No. 3416 (renamed "Liberal School"), north of Calder, Saskatchewan, after school trustee "A. Zayacz" (Zayach?).
- Zazula School District No. 4526, northwest of Hendon, Saskatchewan, after district pioneer Fred Zazula.
- Zbaraz School District No. 2403, south of Krydor, Saskatchewan, Polish name of Zbarazh, Zbarazh Raion, Ternopil Oblast.
- Zhoda School District No. 2377, south of Mikado, Saskatchewan, the Ukrainian word for "harmony".
- Zoria School District No. 3471, west of Mayfair, Saskatchewan, the Ukrainian word for "dawn".

== See also ==
- Ukrainian language
- History of Ukraine
- Ukrainian Cultural Heritage Village
- Joseph Oleskiw
- List of neighbourhoods in Edmonton
- List of villages in Ternopil Oblast
- List of villages in Chernivtsi Oblast
- List of villages in Ivano-Frankivsk Oblast
- List of villages in Lviv Oblast
- Population exchange between Poland and Soviet Ukraine
- Operation Vistula
- History of Germans in Russia, Ukraine and the Soviet Union
- Russian Mennonite
- Walddeutsche or Galician Germans – settled amongst Poles and Ukrainians in Galicia.
- Bessarabia Germans
- Black Sea Germans and Crimea Germans
- uk:Список українських населених пунктів на Далекому Сході

== Sources ==
- Barry, Bill (1998). People Places : The Dictionary of Saskatchewan Place Names. Regina, Saskatchewan: People Places Publishing Ltd. ISBN 1-894022-19-X.
- Barry, Bill (2001). Ukrainian People Places. Regina, Saskatchewan: People Places Publishing Ltd. ISBN 1-894022-65-3.
- City of Edmonton (2004). Naming Edmonton : From Ada to Zoie. Edmonton, Alberta: University of Alberta Press. ISBN 0-88864-423-X
- Hunt, Tina (2003) [2001]. Lamont County : Church Capital of North America (booklet) (2nd ed.). Edmonton, Alberta: Lamont County.
- Luciuk, Lubomyr; Kordan, Bohdan (1989). Creating a Landscape : A Geography of Ukrainians in Canada. Toronto: University of Toronto Press. ISBN 0-8020-5823-X.
- MacGregor, J.G. (1969). Vilni Zemli (Free Lands) : The Ukrainian Settlement of Alberta. Toronto: McClelland & Stewart Ltd.
- Sanders, Harry M. (2003). The Story Behind Alberta Names : How Cities, Towns, Villages and Hamlets Got Their Names. Calgary, Alberta: Red Deer Press. ISBN 0-88995-256-6.
