= List of historic places in Central Alberta =

This article is a list of historic places in Central Alberta entered on the Canadian Register of Historic Places, whether they are federal, provincial, or municipal.

== List ==
Name	Address	Coordinates	Government recognition (CRHP №)	Wikidata ID	Image
Sunnyslope Sandstone Shelter	Alongside Township Road 314 in Kneehill County, approximately 24 km west of Three Hills; Didsbury AB	51°40′24″N 113°37′02″W	Alberta (18051)		
Delburne Alberta Government Telephones Exchange Building	2030 - 22 Avenue; Delburne AB	52°11′55″N 113°14′03″W	Delburne municipality (18843)		Upload Photo
Cronquist House	4707 Fountain Drive, Bower Ponds, Great Chief Park; Red Deer AB	52°16′11″N 113°49′55″W	Red Deer municipality (1649)		Upload Photo
Canadian Pacific Railroad Bridge	Red Deer AB	52°16′33″N 113°49′01″W	Red Deer municipality (1651)		
Clark Residence, The	4757 – 56 Street; Red Deer AB	52°16′30″N 113°48′32″W	Red Deer municipality (1652)		
Allen Bungalow	6316 - 45 Avenue; Red Deer AB	52°17′07″N 113°47′46″W	Red Deer municipality (1656)		Upload Photo
Parsons Residence	4801 - 49 Street; Red Deer AB	52°16′05″N 113°48′32″W	Red Deer municipality (1658)		
Old Red Deer Court House	4836 Ross Street; Red Deer AB	52°16′09″N 113°48′40″W	Alberta (3445), Red Deer municipality (1663)		
Government of Canada Building	4904 Ross Street; Red Deer AB	52°16′08″N 113°48′43″W	Federal (4380)		
Red Deer Armoury / Fire Hall #1	4905 - 49 Street; Red Deer AB	52°16′06″N 113°48′32″W	Red Deer municipality (1665)		
Russo Greek Orthodox Church	Smoky Lake County AB	54°02′35″N 112°08′02″W	Alberta (1818)		More images
Senior Non Commissioned Officer's Building B-30	Cold Lake AB	54°24′47″N 110°16′26″W	Federal (2839)		Upload Photo
Flat Iron Building	5005 - 50 Avenue; Lacombe AB	52°27′47″N 113°43′52″W	Alberta (3032)		More images
Ukrainian Pioneer Home	Sandy Beach; AB	53°40′36″N 112°49′43″W	Federal (3089)	Q24012602	More images
Alberta Pacific Grain Elevator Site Complex	Railway Avenue at Main Street, Meeting Creek; Camrose County AB	52°40′59″N 112°43′59″W	Alberta (3190)		
Hangar 1	4 Wing Cold Lake; Cold Lake AB	54°24′22″N 110°16′41″W	Federal (3357)		Upload Photo
Hangar 2	4 Wing Cold Lake; Cold Lake AB	54°24′47″N 110°16′26″W	Federal (3358)		Upload Photo
Hangar 3	4 Wing Cold Lake; Cold Lake AB	54°24′47″N 110°16′27″W	Federal (2001)		Upload Photo
Hangar 4	4 Wing Cold Lake; Cold Lake AB	54°24′47″N 110°16′27″W	Federal (3365)		Upload Photo
Hangar 6	4 Wing Cold Lake; Cold Lake AB	54°24′47″N 110°16′28″W	Federal (9476)		Upload Photo
Superintendent's Residence	near Elk Island National Park West Gate; AB	53°41′5″N 112°52′0″W	Federal (3561)	Q24012859	More images
Barn	near Elk Island National Park Visitor Center; Elk Island National Park AB	53°34′45″N 112°50′07″W	Federal (4427)		Upload Photo
Pavilion	Sandy Beach; AB	53°40′43″N 112°49′50″W	Federal (3562)	Q23937541	More images
Normal School / Rosehaven	4612 53 Street	53°0′55″N 112°49′59″W	Alberta (5005)	Q24284741	More images
Roland Michener House	5036 - 51 Street; Lacombe AB	52°27′51″N 113°43′55″W	Alberta (5006)		
St. Edmund's Anglican Church		52°2′15″N 112°45′11″W	Alberta (5007)	Q24039796	More images
Ukrainian Greek Orthodox Church of St. Mary (Szypentiz district)	east of Hairy Hill; AB	53°46′17.321″N 111°51′16.826″W	Alberta (5063)	Q7878462	Upload Photo
Alberta Pacific Grain Elevator	49 Avenue; Castor AB	52°13′01″N 111°54′14″W	Alberta (5099)		More images
Camrose Feed Mill	4919 47 Street	53°1′18″N 112°49′12″W	Alberta (5102)	Q24284733	More images
Krause Milling Company Grain Elevator and Flour Mill Site Complex	First Street East and Railway Avenue, Radway; Thorhild County AB	54°03′37″N 112°56′31″W	Alberta (5106)		Upload Photo
Camrose Public Library	4859 50 Street	53°1′12″N 112°49′30″W	Alberta (5135)	Q24284731	More images
Catholic Church of St. Thomas	north of Duhamel; Camrose County AB	52°56′37″N 112°56′31″W	Alberta (5136)		Upload Photo
St. Norbert's Roman Catholic Church	southeast of Provost; Provost Municipal District No. 52 AB	52°15′35″N 110°10′16″W	Alberta (5148)		
Battle River Lutheran Church	near Chauvin; Wainwright Municipal District No. 61 AB	52°52′21″N 110°11′06″W	Wainwright Municipal District No. 61 municipality (5174)		Upload Photo
Fort Ethier		53°1′43″N 113°24′43″W	Alberta (5180)	Q24038549	More images
Wetaskiwin Court House	4705 50th Avenue	52°58′7″N 113°22′0″W	Federal (7552), Alberta (5188)	Q23706048	More images
Canadian Bank of Commerce Building	5204 - 50 Avenue; Innisfree AB	53°22′53″N 111°31′48″W	Alberta (5215)		
Verdun School	near New Norway; Camrose County AB	52°55′51″N 113°05′17″W	Alberta (5216)		Upload Photo
Greenridge Farm	north of Dewberry; Vermilion River AB	53°40′29″N 110°29′46″W	Alberta (5347)		Upload Photo
Hiebert Residence	2102 24th Avenue; AB	51°39′53.122″N 114°8′24.317″W	Alberta (5738)	Q37778160	More images
Dr. Henry George Residence	5711 - 13 51 Avenue; Innisfail AB	52°01′54″N 113°57′14″W	Alberta (5739)		
Canadian Northern Station Building and Roundhouse Site Complex	Railway Ave. Big Valley AB	52°01′58″N 112°44′56″W	Alberta (5001)		
C. N. R. Station and Water Tower	Heinsburg AB	53°46′06″N 110°31′31″W	Alberta (5002)		
Alberta Wheat Pool Grain Elevator Site Complex	Andrew AB	53°52′38″N 112°20′19″W	Alberta (5100)		
Canadian Pacific Railway Station	Railway Street; Didsbury AB	51°39′30.640″N 114°8′14.165″W	Alberta (5740)	Q37777536	More images
Canadian Pacific Railway Station	700 1st Avenue; Beiseker AB	51°23′07″N 113°32′18″W	Beiseker municipality (8770)		
Canadian Northern Railway Station	Railway Dr. Smoky Lake AB	54°06′46″N 112°28′16″W	Alberta (6855)		
Canadian Northern Railway Station	4407 - 47 Avenue; Camrose AB	53°00′56″N 112°48′56″W	Alberta (7759)		Upload Photo
Canadian Northern Railway Station	Railway Avenue; Meeting Creek AB	52°40′53″N 112°43′43″W	Alberta (8768)		Upload Photo
Canadian National Railway Station	4922 - 52 Avenue; Vegreville AB	53°29′46″N 112°02′59″W	Alberta (7422)		Upload Photo
St. Mary's Romanian Orthodox Church of Boian		53°49′45″N 112°0′18″W	Alberta (5758)	Q24025035	Upload Photo
River Lot 3		54°0′29″N 112°23′38″W	Alberta (5759)	Q24042166	Upload Photo
Coronation Boundary Marker	Coronation; Paintearth County No. 18 AB	51°58′08″N 111°25′59″W	Alberta (5889)		Upload Photo
Stephansson House	Twp Road 371, west of Range Road 22	52°9′33.30″N 114°12′4.07″W	Alberta (5892)	Q34118715	More images
Alberta Hospital Building No. 1	south of Ponoka; Ponoka County AB	52°39′03″N 113°34′26″W	Alberta (5894)		Upload Photo
Former Calgary and Edmonton Railway Station	5102 Ross St. (or 50th St.) CPR Right of Way; Red Deer AB	52°16′05″N 113°48′58″W	Federal (6471), Alberta (2894), Red Deer municipality (1719)		Upload Photo
Dickson Store and Site	Dickson; Red Deer County AB	52°03′27″N 114°18′40″W	Alberta (6557)		Upload Photo
Old St. Paul Rectory	St. Paul AB	53°59′25″N 111°17′17″W	Alberta (6561)		Upload Photo
Lamont United Church	5102 - 53 Street; Lamont AB	53°45′40″N 112°47′17″W	Lamont municipality (7433)		Upload Photo
Victoria Settlement		54°0′13.82″N 112°23′53.16″W	Federal (7744)	Q5472219	More images
Rocky Mountain House trading post	Hwy. 11A, west of Rocky Mountain House; AB	52°21′59″N 114°57′48″W	Federal (7827)	Q23706052	More images
Nativity of the Holy Virgin Orthodox Church of Kysylew	north of Andrew; Lamont County AB	53°54′53″N 112°21′29″W	Lamont County municipality (7917)		Upload Photo
Ukrainian Catholic Church of Spasa (Muskalik)	east of Mundare on Range Road 160; Lamont County AB	53°37′27″N 112°12′50″W	Lamont County municipality (7918)		Upload Photo
Russo-Orthodox Church of the Transfiguration (Star Edna)	north of Lamont; Lamont County AB	53°51′45″N 112°43′44″W	Lamont County municipality (7919)		Upload Photo
St. Nicholas Ukrainian Catholic Church of St. Michael And Bell Tower	southeast of St. Michael; Lamont County AB	53°48′08″N 112°34′26″W	Lamont County municipality (7920)		
Presentation of the Blessed Virgin Mary Ukrainian Catholic Church (Delph)	north of Lamont; Lamont County AB	54°00′53″N 112°40′37″W	Lamont County municipality (7921)		Upload Photo
Nativity of the Blessed Virgin Mary Ukrainian Greek Catholic Church	north of Lamont; Lamont County AB	53°59′56″N 112°49′41″W	Lamont County municipality (7924)		Upload Photo
Sharman House	RR #3, near Onoway; Lac Ste. Anne County AB	53°39′38″N 114°12′43″W	Alberta (7983)		Upload Photo
Diplomat Mine Site	southwest of Forestburg; Flagstaff County AB	52°30′20″N 112°11′28″W	Alberta (7985)		Upload Photo
Urquhart Block	4923 - 50 Avenue; Lacombe AB	52°27′47″N 113°43′48″W	Alberta (8252)		
Markerville Creamery	114 Creamery Way	52°7′25.0″N 114°10′19.2″W	Alberta (8453)	Q34120180	Upload Photo
M and J Hardware Building	4910 to 4912 - 50 Avenue; Lacombe AB	52°27′48″N 113°43′48″W	Alberta (8753)		
Newbrook Observatory	Newbrook; Thorhild County AB	54°19′28″N 112°57′18″W	Alberta (8809)		Upload Photo
George Pegg Homestead And Botanic Garden	near Glenevis; Lac Ste. Anne County AB	53°48′30″N 114°31′08″W	Alberta (8812)		Upload Photo
Horse Barn, Building 1	Sundre; Clearwater County AB	51°44′15″N 115°35′46″W	Federal (9602)		Upload Photo
Lac Ste. Anne Pilgrimage site		53°42′N 114°24′W	Federal (9618)	Q6467888	More images
Alberta Wheat Pool Grain Elevator (Paradise Valley)	Paradise Valley AB		Alberta (10403)		More images
Alberta Wheat Pool Grain Elevator	4715 - 52 Avenue; Mayerthorpe AB	53°57′19″N 115°08′05″W	Alberta (8038)		Upload Photo
Canadian Pacific Railway Station	Paradise Valley AB	53°01′49″N 110°17′46″W	Alberta (10457)		Upload Photo
The Bailey Theatre	5041 50 Street	53°1′24″N 112°49′30″W	Camrose municipality (10818)	Q24284729	More images
Wainwright Hotel	202 - 10 Street; Wainwright AB	52°50′02″N 110°51′40″W	Alberta (11129)		Upload Photo
Whitecourt / Woodlands Meteorite Impact Crater	near Whitecourt; Woodlands County AB		Alberta (11389)		Upload Photo
Baptiste River Metis Settlement Site	confluence of Baptiste River and North Saskatchewan River; Clearwater County AB		Alberta (11557)		Upload Photo
Buffalo Lake Metis Settlement	between Buffalo Lake and Lynn Lake, near Stettler; Stettler County No. 6 AB		Alberta (11558)		Upload Photo
Fort De L'Isle	northeast of Myrnam; AB	53°45′11″N 111°10′34″W	Alberta (11562)	Q5472471	Upload Photo
Fort White Earth	west of confluence of White Earth Creek and North Saskatchewan River; Smoky Lake County AB		Alberta (11576)		Upload Photo
Fort Vermilion	Lea Park, north of Marwayne; Vermilion River County AB		Alberta (11577)		Upload Photo
Bashaw Fire Hall	5018 50th Street	52°35′3″N 112°58′16″W	Alberta (11818)	Q24279158	Upload Photo
Brazeau Collieries Minesite	Nordegg; AB	52°28′14″N 116°4′31″W	Federal (12009), Alberta (15529)	Q23706045	More images
Vilna Pool Hall and Barbershop	5028 - 50 Street; Vilna AB	54°06′58″N 111°55′16″W	Alberta (12410)		More images
Campbell Block	4922 and 4918 - 50 Avenue; Lacombe AB	52°27′48″N 113°43′48″W	Alberta (12411)		
MacKenzie School	Building 83, Hickory Street; Cold Lake AB	54°25′04″N 110°15′50″W	Federal (13079)		Upload Photo
École Voyageur	Building 82, Birch Avenue; Cold Lake AB	54°25′04″N 110°15′50″W	Federal (13083)		Upload Photo
Holy Trinity Anglican Church	southeast of Red Deer; Red Deer County AB	52°06′33″N 113°28′54″W	Red Deer County municipality (13353)		Upload Photo
Markerville Lutheran Church	66 Johnson Avenue	52°7′28.9″N 114°10′12.0″W	Alberta (18804), Red Deer County municipality (13354)	Q34121041	More images
Our Lady of the Rosary Hospital	5406 - 47 Street; Castor AB	52°13′26″N 111°54′29″W	Alberta (15687)		Upload Photo
Alberta Government Telephones Exchange Building	5041 A - 50 Street; Mannville AB	53°20′20″N 111°10′44″W	Alberta (15695)		Upload Photo
Donalda Creamery	Foster Street; Donalda AB	52°35′10″N 112°34′34″W	Alberta (16522)		Upload Photo
Fort Assiniboine		54°20′2″N 114°46′27″W	Federal (17704)	Q18534260	Upload Photo
Village Tresures	5009-50th Street; Mannville AB	53°20′15″N 111°10′44″W	Mannville municipality (17905)		Upload Photo
St. Monica's Anglican Church	4910 - 53 Street, Mirror; Lacombe County AB	52°27′53″N 113°06′40″W	Lacombe County municipality (17945)		Upload Photo
St. Laurence Anglican Church	Monitor; Special Area No. 4 AB	51°58′43″N 110°34′08″W	Special Area No. 4 municipality (17946)		Upload Photo
Beatty Heritage House	5002 - 51 Street; Rimbey AB	52°38′24″N 114°14′31″W	Alberta (18321), Rimbey municipality (3189)		Upload Photo
Northern Defence Radar Station	near Cold Lake; AB	54°26′6″N 110°10′55″W	Alberta (18390)	Q24279148	Upload Photo
Red Brick School	2118 21st Avenue	51°39′43.621″N 114°8′26.826″W	Alberta (18593)	Q38529880	More images
Lacombe Blacksmith Shop	5020 - 49 Street; Lacombe AB		Alberta (18865)		More images
McDonald Stopping House	Township Road 585A at Range Road 182, southeast of Waskatenau; Waskatenau AB	54°03′22″N 112°43′40″W	Alberta (18805)		Upload Photo
Parkland Evangelical Lutheran Church	Province Route 26 east of Range Road 184, east of Ohaton; Ohaton AB	53°01′05″N 112°34′51″W	Alberta (17821)		Upload Photo
Community Rest Room	5014 - 51 Avenue; Ponoka AB	52°40′38″N 113°34′36″W	Alberta (18826)		Upload Photo
Merchants Bank of Canada Building	4813 - 47 Street; Sedgewick AB	52°46′27″N 111°41′32″W	Alberta (13577)		Upload Photo
Strome Memorial Hall	50 Street; Strome AB	52°48′43″N 112°03′58″W	Alberta (18825)		
Smeltzer House	1 Broadmoor Blvd, Sherwood Park; Strathcona County AB	53°31′20″N 113°19′09″W			

== See also ==
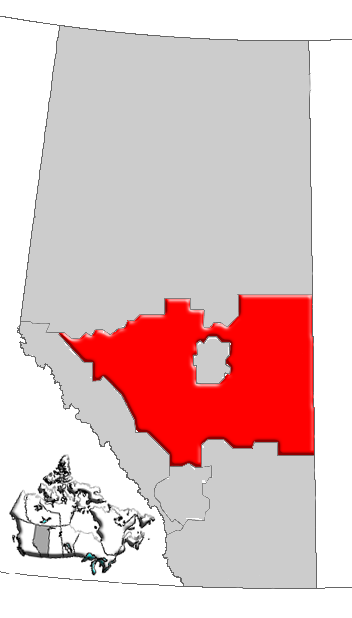
