= Alberta Highway 855 =

Highway in Alberta, Canada

Highway 855

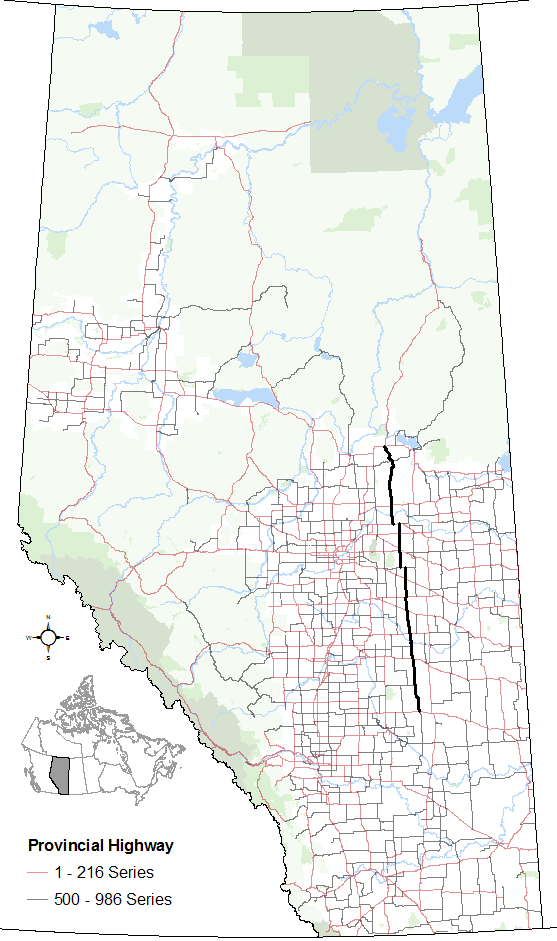

Route information
- Maintained by Alberta Transportation
- Length: 389.2 km (241.8 mi)

Major junctions
- South end: Highway 9 west of Hanna
- Highway 12; Highway 13; Highway 14; Highway 16 (TCH); Highway 28
- North end: Highway 55 in Atmore

Location
- Country: Canada
- Province: Alberta
- Specialized and rural municipalities: Special Area No. 2, Stettler County No. 6, Paintearth County No. 18, Flagstaff County, Beaver County, Lamont County, Smoky Lake County, Lac La Biche County, Athabasca County
- Towns: Daysland, Mundare, Smoky Lake

Highway system
- Alberta Provincial Highway Network; List; Former
| ← Highway 854 | → Highway 856 |

Alberta Provincial Highway No. 855 is a highway in the province of Alberta, Canada. It runs south–north from Highway 9 west of Hanna to Highway 55 and Highway 63 in Atmore. It provides access to rural areas, and is gravel at both its south and north ends. At 389 km (242 mi) it is the longest 500–986 series highway in Alberta.

It is also known as Lougheed Avenue in Heisler, 45 Street in Daysland, 54 Street in Holden, Sawchuk Street in Mundare, and 50 Street in Andrew and Smoky Lake.

== Major intersections ==
Starting from the south end of Highway 855:

| Rural/specialized municipality | Location | km | mi | Destinations | Notes |
|---|---|---|---|---|---|
| Special Area No. 2 | | 0.0 | 0.0 | Highway 9 – Drumheller, Hanna | Southern terminus |
| County of Stettler No. 6 | | 38.3 | 23.8 | Highway 589 begins / Township Road 350 | Highway 589 eastern terminus; south end of Highway 589 concurrency |
| County of Stettler No. 6 | | 39.4 | 24.5 | Highway 589 west – Endiang | North end of Highway 589 concurrency |
| County of Paintearth No. 18 | Halkirk | 73.8 | 45.9 | Highway 12 east – Castor | South end of Highway 12 concurrency |
| County of Paintearth No. 18 | | 75.8 | 47.1 | Highway 12 west – Stettler | North end of Highway 12 concurrency |
| County of Paintearth No. 18 | | 90.3 | 56.1 | Highway 601 west – Red Willow | |
| County of Paintearth No. 18 | | 99.0 | 61.5 | Big Knife Provincial Park | |
| ↑ / ↓ | | 99.5 | 61.8 | Crosses the Battle River | |
| Flagstaff County | | 109.9 | 68.3 | Highway 53 east – Forestburg | South end of Highway 53 concurrency |
| Flagstaff County | | 111.6 | 69.3 | Highway 53 west – Donalda, Bashaw | North end of Highway 53 concurrency |
| Flagstaff County | Heisler | 121.9 | 75.7 | | |
| Flagstaff County | | 142.6 | 88.6 | Highway 13 east – Killam | South end of Highway 13 concurrency |
| Flagstaff County | Daysland | 144.4 | 89.7 | Highway 13 west – Camrose | North end of Highway 13 concurrency |
| Beaver County | | 161.9 | 100.6 | Highway 26 – Camrose, Viking | |
| Beaver County | Holden | 185.7 | 115.4 | Highway 14 – Ryley, Tofield, Viking | |
| Beaver County | | 200.8 | 124.8 | Highway 626 east – Vegreville | South end of Highway 626 concurrency |
| Beaver County | | 207.0 | 128.6 | Highway 626 west – Ryley, Tofield | North end of Highway 626 concurrency |
| Lamont County | | 229.6 | 142.7 | Highway 16 (TCH/YH) – Edmonton, Lloydminster; Highway 15 begins | Highway 15 eastern terminus; south end of Highway 15 concurrency |
| Lamont County | Mundare | 231.8 | 144.0 | Highway 15 west (49 Avenue) – Lamont, Fort Saskatchewan | North end of Highway 15 concurrency |
| Lamont County | | 252.3 | 156.8 | Highway 29 – Fort Saskatchewan, Hairy Hill | |
| Lamont County | Andrew | 265.2 | 164.8 | Highway 45 east – Hairy Hill, Two Hills | South end of Highway 45 concurrency |
| Lamont County | | 273.3 | 169.8 | Highway 45 west – Bruderheim | North end of Highway 45 concurrency |
| ↑ / ↓ | | 284.8 | 177.0 | Crosses the North Saskatchewan River | |
| Smoky Lake County | Smoky Lake | 299.4 | 186.0 | Highway 28 – Edmonton, Redwater, Cold Lake | |
| Smoky Lake County | Buffalo Lake Metis Settlement | No major junctions | | | |
| Lac La Biche County | | 359.0 | 223.1 | Highway 663 – Boyle, Lac La Biche | |
| Athabasca County | Atmore | 389.2 | 241.8 | Highway 55 / Highway 63 – Fort McMurray, Lac La Biche, Edmonton | Northern terminus; continues as Highway 63 north |
1.000 mi = 1.609 km; 1.000 km = 0.621 mi: Concurrency terminus
