= Alberta Highway 45 =

Highway in Alberta

Highway 45

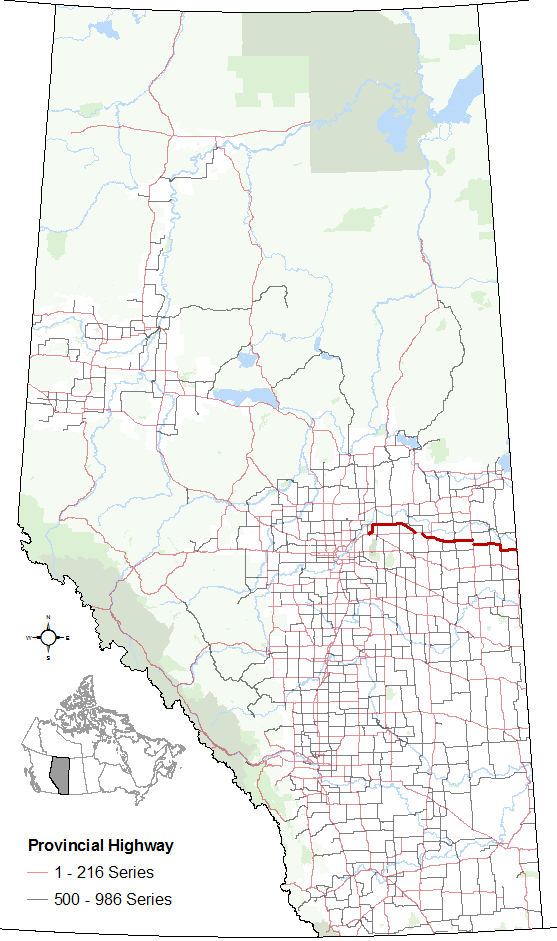

Route information
- Maintained by the Ministry of Transportation and Economic Corridors
- Length: 230.0 km (142.9 mi)

Major junctions
- West end: Highway 15 south of Bruderheim
- Highway 38 near Bruderheim; Highway 29 near Hairy Hill; Highway 36 in Two Hills; Highway 41 near Derwent; Highway 17 near Lloydminster
- East end: Highway 3 at Saskatchewan border

Location
- Country: Canada
- Province: Alberta
- Specialized and rural municipalities: Lamont County, County of Two Hills No. 21, County of Vermilion River
- Towns: Bruderheim, Two Hills
- Villages: Willingdon, Myrnam, Marwayne

Highway system
- Alberta Provincial Highway Network; List; Former
← Highway 44	→ Highway 47

Alberta Provincial Highway No. 45, commonly referred to as Highway 45, is an east-west highway in central Alberta, Canada that extends from Highway 15 northeast of Edmonton to the Saskatchewan border. It runs generally parallel to Highway 16 (Yellowhead Highway).

== Major intersections ==
From west to east:

Rural/specialized municipality	Location	km	mi	Destinations	Notes
Lamont County		0.0	0.0	Highway 15 – Lamont, Mundare, Fort Saskatchewan, Edmonton	Highway 45 western terminus
Lamont County	Bruderheim	3.2	2.0		
Lamont County		16.0	9.9	Highway 38 west – Redwater	
Lamont County		22.5	14.0	Highway 831 – Waskatenau, Boyle, Lamont	
Lamont County		32.3	20.1	Range Road 184 – St. Michael	
Lamont County		43.7	27.2	Highway 855 north / Range Road 173 – Wostok, Smoky Lake	West end of Highway 855 concurrency
Lamont County	Andrew	51.8	32.2	Highway 855 south (50 Street) – Mundare	East end of Highway 855 concurrency
Lamont County		56.5	35.1	Highway 645 east	
County of Two Hills No. 21	Willingdon	66.8	41.5	Highway 857 north – Bellis	West end of Highway 857 concurrency
County of Two Hills No. 21		73.1	45.4	Highway 857 south – Vegreville	East end of Highway 857 concurrency
County of Two Hills No. 21		77.0	47.8	Highway 29 west – Lamont, Fort Saskatchewan	West end in Highway 29 concurrency; former Highway 637 west
County of Two Hills No. 21		79.1	49.2	UAR 150 south – Hairy Hill	
County of Two Hills No. 21		86.9	54.0	Highway 29 east to Highway 860 north – St. Paul	East end of Highway 29 concurrency; former Highway 637 east
County of Two Hills No. 21	Two Hills	97.6	60.6	Highway 36 south (51 Street) – Viking	West end of Highway 36 concurrency
County of Two Hills No. 21		101.5	63.1	Highway 36 north – St. Paul, Lac La Biche	East end of Highway 36 concurrency
County of Two Hills No. 21	Morecambe	118.0	73.3	Highway 870 south – Innisfree	
County of Two Hills No. 21	Myrnam	133.4	82.9	Highway 881 (50 Street) – Mannville, St. Paul	
County of Two Hills No. 21	Derwent	151.6	94.2	UAR 155 south	
County of Two Hills No. 21		158.0	98.2	Highway 41 north – Elk Point, St. Paul, Bonnyville	West end of Highway 41 concurrency
County of Two Hills No. 21		164.5	102.2	Highway 41 south – Vermilion	East end of Highway 41 concurrency
County of Vermilion River		173.9	108.1	UAR 57 south – Clandonald	
County of Vermilion River		185.7	115.4	Highway 893 south – Islay	West end of Highway 893 concurrency
County of Vermilion River	Dewberry	187.3	116.4	Highway 893 north / UAR 56 south – Heinsburg	East end of Highway 893 concurrency
County of Vermilion River		200.9	124.8	Highway 897 north – Frog Lake, Cold Lake	West end of Highway 897 concurrency
County of Vermilion River	Marwayne	208.3	129.4	Highway 897 south – Kitscoty	East end of Highway 897 concurrency
County of Vermilion River		230.0	142.9	Highway 17 – Onion Lake, Lloydminster Highway 3 east – St. Walburg, Prince Albert	Highway 45 eastern terminus; continues as Highway 3 into Saskatchewan
1.000 mi = 1.609 km; 1.000 km = 0.621 mi: Concurrency terminus; Route transition
