= Chortitz, Manitoba =

Chortitz
- Location of Chortitz in Manitoba
- Coordinates: 49°8′1″N 97°58′31″W
- Country: Canada
- Province: Manitoba
- Region: Pembina Valley
- Census Division: No. 3

Government
  - Governing Body: Rural Municipality of Stanley Council
  - MP: Branden Leslie
  - MLA: Josh Guenter
- Time zone: UTC−6 (CST)
  - Summer (DST): UTC−5 (CDT)
- Area codes: 204, 431
- NTS Map: 062H04
- GNBC Code: GAEYU

Chortitz is an unincorporated community in south central Manitoba, Canada. It is located approximately 8 kilometers (5 miles) southwest of Winkler, Manitoba in the Rural Municipality of Stanley.

The name "Chortitz" is of Ukrainian origin, derived from the place name of Khortytsia in Zaporizhzhia, Ukraine.

== See also ==
- List of Canadian place names of Ukrainian origin
