= Edwand =

- Hamlet
- Location of Edwand Edwand (Canada)
- Coordinates: 54°08′33″N 112°16′34″W
- Country: Canada
- Province: Alberta
- Region: Central Alberta
- Census division: 12
- Municipal district: Smoky Lake County

Government
  - Type: Unincorporated
  - Mayor: Adam Shupenia
  - Governing body: Smoky Lake County Council

Population (1986)
  - Total: 2
- Time zone: UTC−06:00 (Alberta Time)
- Area codes: 780, 587, 825

Edwand is a hamlet in central Alberta, Canada within Smoky Lake County. It is located 4 kilometres (2.5 mi) north of Highway 28, approximately 104 kilometres (65 mi) northeast of Edmonton.

Edward Anderson, an early postmaster, coined the name after his own.

== Demographics ==
Edwand recorded a population of 2 in the 1986 Census of Population conducted by Statistics Canada.

== See also ==
- List of communities in Alberta
- List of hamlets in Alberta
