= Star, Alberta =

Star
- Hamlet
- Location of Star Star (Canada)
- Coordinates: 53°49′11″N 112°46′32″W
- Country: Canada
- Province: Alberta
- Region: Central Alberta
- Census division: 10
- Municipal district: Lamont County

Government
  - Type: Unincorporated
  - Governing body: Lamont County Council

Population (1991)
  - Total: 32
- Time zone: UTC−06:00 (Alberta Time)
- Area codes: 780, 587, 825

Star is a hamlet in central Alberta, Canada located within Lamont County. It lies along Highway 831, approximately 5 kilometres (3.1 mi) north of Lamont and 8 kilometres (5.0 mi) south of Highway 45.

== Demographics ==
Star recorded a population of 32 in the 1991 Census of Population conducted by Statistics Canada.

== See also ==
- Edna-Star Colony
