= Delph, Alberta =

Coordinates: 54.000°N 112.667°W

Delph is a rural locality in Alberta, Canada. It is in Lamont County, approximately 70 km (43 mi) northeast of Edmonton.

Delph derives its name from the Hiberno-English term for dishware.
