= St. Petro Mohyla Institute =

Coordinates: 49°48′58.45″N 97°8′53.43″W

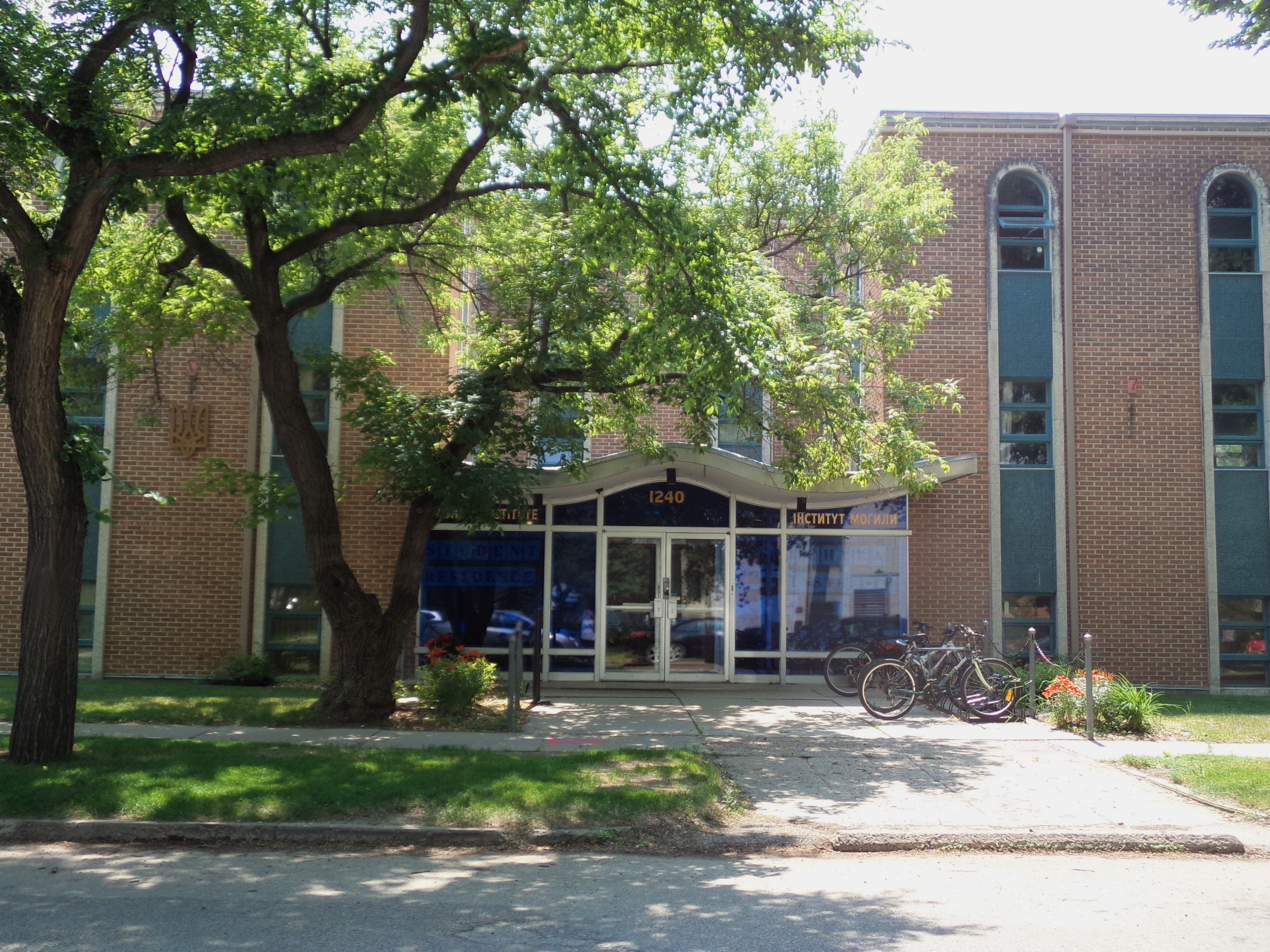
- Type: Ukrainian language and cultural institute; university residence;
- Established: 1916
- Undergraduates: Ukrainian language, history and literature
- Location: Saskatoon., Saskatchewan, Canada
- Campus: Urban Suburban
- Website: http://mohylainstitute.ca/

St. Petro Mohyla Institute (Ukrainian: Інститут ім. Св. Петра Могили) is a student residence founded in 1916 by the Ukrainian community of Saskatchewan.

The original mandate of Mohyla Institute was to provide housing and cultural programs for Ukrainian-Canadian students to promote the preservation of Ukrainian culture in the Canadian diaspora. Mohyla Institute has since become a residence for post-secondary students of all nationalities and backgrounds, while still focusing on the preservation of Ukrainian culture in Saskatchewan.

Mohyla Institute is a home away from home for residents including those of Ukrainian ancestry, and for students throughout Canada and abroad. The residence is open to all students pursuing post-secondary education at various institutions throughout Saskatoon. Due to the institute's close proximity to the University of Saskatchewan, the majority of residents are enrolled at the university in a variety of programs.

Mohyla Institute continues to honor its Ukrainian roots by providing space for Ukrainian organizations. Mohyla has been a long-time supporter of Saskatoon's Orthodox Ukrainian Youth Choir Lastiwka, who call the institute home. Mohyla also offers a Ukrainian language immersion program for high school students in the summer months to continue the mandate of its founders to preserve Ukrainian language and culture. Mohyla Institute is very involved in the Ukrainian community in Saskatchewan, as well as throughout Canada.

== History ==
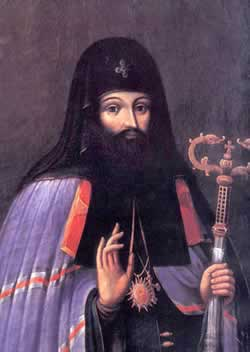
Petro Mohyla

The institute was founded in 1916, and named after the Ukrainian Orthodox Metropolitan, St. Petro Mohyla. Later the institute moved from its original location on Main Street to its current address at 1240 Temperance Street in the 1960s.

== See also ==
- Ukrainian Orthodox Church of Canada
- Ukrainian Canadian
- List of Canadian place names of Ukrainian origin
