= Stephen Worobetz =

Canadian politician

The Honourable Stephen Worobetz OC MC SOM FRCSC

13th Lieutenant Governor of Saskatchewan
- In office February 2, 1970 – February 29, 1976
- Monarch: Elizabeth II
- Governors General: Roland Michener; Jules Léger
- Premier: Ross Thatcher; Allan Blakeney
- Preceded by: Robert Hanbidge
- Succeeded by: George Porteous

Personal details
- Born: December 26, 1914 Krydor, Saskatchewan, Canada
- Died: February 2, 2006 (aged 91) Saskatoon, Saskatchewan, Canada
- Education: University of Saskatchewan
- Occupation: Physician

Stephen Worobetz OC MC SOM FRCSC (December 26, 1914 – February 2, 2006) was a Canadian physician and the 13th lieutenant governor of Saskatchewan, from 1970 to 1976.

Born in Krydor, Saskatchewan, of Ukrainian origin, he received a Bachelor of Science from the University of Saskatchewan in 1935 and a Doctor of Medicine from University of Manitoba in 1940. During World War II, he served as a medical officer with the Canadian Army in Italy and was awarded the Military Cross. After the war, he practised medicine in Saskatoon and studied to be a general surgeon in Winnipeg and Philadelphia.

From 1970 to 1976, he was the 13th Lieutenant Governor of Saskatchewan. As The Queen's representative in Saskatchewan, he carried out such duties as reading the Speech from the Throne, swearing in premiers and Cabinet ministers, opening legislative sessions, and bestowing honours upon Saskatchewan citizens. Afterwards he returned to his medical practice until his retirement in 1982.

In 1993, he was made an Officer of the Order of Canada. In 1999, he was awarded the Saskatchewan Order of Merit.

Worobetz died on February 2, 2006.
