= Hamlin, Alberta =

Coordinates: 53°58′38″N 111°54′38″W

Location of Hamlin Alberta

Hamlin is an unincorporated community in central Alberta in Smoky Lake County, located 15 kilometres (9.3 mi) south of Highway 28, 125 kilometres (78 mi) southwest of Cold Lake.

The community takes its name from Hamelin, England, the ancestral home of a first settler.
