= Hilliard, Alberta =

Hilliard
- Hamlet
- Location of Hilliard Hilliard (Canada)
- Coordinates: 53°38′24″N 112°28′55″W
- Country: Canada
- Province: Alberta
- Region: Central Alberta
- Census division: 10
- Municipal district: Lamont County

Government
  - Type: Unincorporated
  - Governing body: Lamont County Council

Population (1991)
  - Total: 35
- Time zone: UTC−06:00 (Alberta Time)
- Area codes: 780, 587, 825

Hilliard is a hamlet in central Alberta, Canada within Lamont County. It is located on Highway 15, approximately 68 kilometres (42 mi) east of Edmonton.

== Demographics ==
Population history of Hilliard
Year	Pop.	±%
1941	134	—
1951	104	−22.4%
1956	92	−11.5%
1961	85	−7.6%
1966	64	−24.7%
1971	64	+0.0%
1976	55	−14.1%
1981	46	−16.4%
1986	47	+2.2%
1991	35	−25.5%
Source: Statistics Canada

Hilliard recorded a population of 35 in the 1991 Census of Population conducted by Statistics Canada.

== See also ==
- List of communities in Alberta
- List of hamlets in Alberta
