= Morecambe, Alberta =

Morecambe
- Hamlet
- Location of Morecambe Morecambe (Canada)
- Coordinates: 53°39′52″N 111°28′12″W
- Country: Canada
- Province: Alberta
- Region: Central Alberta
- Census division: 10
- Municipal district: County of Two Hills No. 21

Government
  - Type: Unincorporated
  - Governing body: County of Two Hills No. 21 Council

Population (1981)
  - Total: 23
- Time zone: UTC−06:00 (Alberta Time)
- Area codes: 780, 587, 825

Morecambe is a hamlet in central Alberta, Canada within the County of Two Hills No. 21. It is located 0.5 kilometres (0.31 mi) south of Highway 45, approximately 104 kilometres (65 mi) northwest of Lloydminster.

== Demographics ==
Morecambe recorded a population of 23 in the 1981 Census of Population conducted by Statistics Canada.

== See also ==
- List of communities in Alberta
- List of hamlets in Alberta
