= Krydor =

Village in Saskatchewan, Canada

- Village
- Village of Krydor
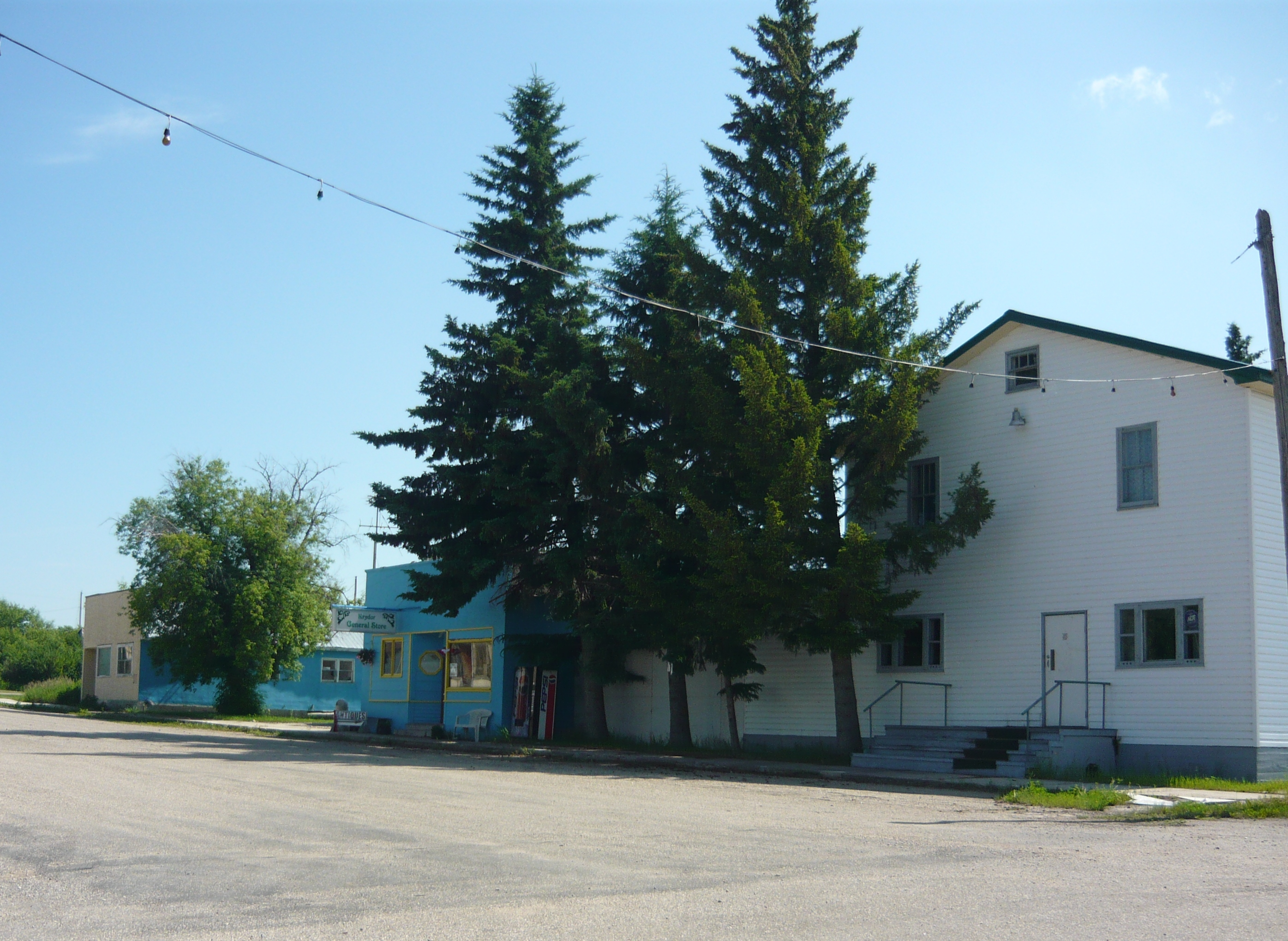
- Krydor's Main Street

- Location of Krydor in Saskatchewan Krydor (Canada)
- Coordinates: 52.745°N 107.195°W
- Country: Canada
- Province: Saskatchewan
- Region: Central
- Census division: 16
- Rural municipality: Redberry No. 435
- Post office founded: September 1, 1911
- Incorporated (Village): 1914

Government
  - Type: Municipal
  - Governing body: []
  - Mayor: Russell Krysak
  - Administrator: Wendy Tanchak

Area
  - Total: 0.82 km^{2} (0.32 sq mi)

Population (2016)
  - Total: 14
  - Density: 18.2/km^{2} (47/sq mi)
- Time zone: UTC-6 (CST)
- Postal code: S0J 1A0
- Area code: 306
- Highways: Highway 40
- Railways: Carlton Trail Railway

Krydor (2016 population: 15) is a village in the Canadian province of Saskatchewan within the Rural Municipality of Redberry No. 435 and Census Division No. 16. The community's name is a combination of the names of two early settlers, Petro Krysak and Teodor Lucyk (KRYsak + teoDOR). Petro Krysak also served as the first postmaster, from September 1, 1911, to July 7, 1913.

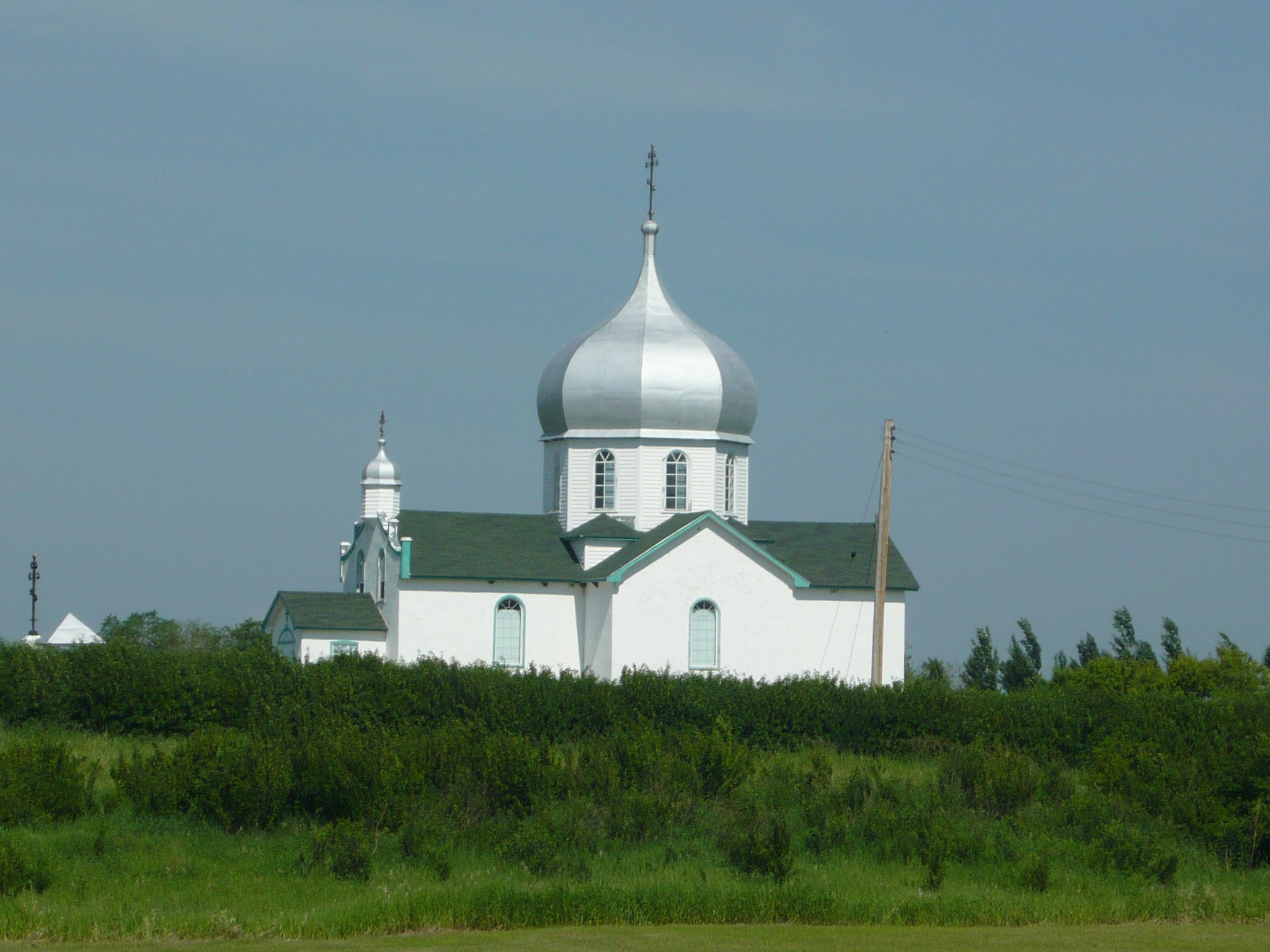
Ukrainian Orthodox Church, Krydor

== History ==
Ukrainian settlers from Sokal arrived in the Krydor area in 1905. Krydor incorporated as a village on August 25, 1914.

== Demographics ==
Population history (1981–2016)
Year	Pop.	±%
1981	73	—
1986	53	−27.4%
1991	34	−35.8%
1996	29	−14.7%
2001	25	−13.8%
2006	25	+0.0%
2011	15	−40.0%
2016	15	+0.0%
Source: Statistics Canada via Saskatchewan Bureau of Statistics

In the 2021 Census of Population conducted by Statistics Canada, Krydor had a population of 15 living in 15 of its 25 total private dwellings, a change of 0% from its 2016 population of 15. With a land area of 0.94 km^{2} (0.36 sq mi), it had a population density of 16.0/km^{2} (41.3/sq mi) in 2021.

In the 2016 Census of Population, the Village of Krydor recorded a population of 15 living in 12 of its 24 total private dwellings, a 0% change from its 2011 population of 15. With a land area of 0.82 km^{2} (0.32 sq mi), it had a population density of 18.3/km^{2} (47.4/sq mi) in 2016.

In the 2011 Census of Population, the Krydor had a population of 15, a -40% change from the 2006 Census of population, which had recorded the population of the village as 25.

== Notable people ==
- Mike Kostiuk (August 1, 1919 – July 26, 2015) was a National Football League offensive lineman.
- Stephen Worobetz (December 14, 1914 – February 2, 2006) was 13th Lieutenant Governor of Saskatchewan.

== See also ==
- List of communities in Saskatchewan
- List of villages in Saskatchewan
