= Willingdon, Alberta =

Willingdon
- Hamlet
- Hamlet of Willingdon
- Location of Willingdon in Alberta
- Coordinates: 53°49′53″N 112°07′39″W
- Country: Canada
- Province: Alberta
- Region: Central Alberta
- Census division: 10
- Municipal district: County of Two Hills No. 21
- Incorporated
  - Village: August 31, 1928
- Dissolved: September 1, 2017
- Named for: Freeman Freeman-Thomas, 1st Marquess of Willingdon

Government
  - Governing body: County of Two Hills No. 21 Council

Area (2021)
  - Land: 0.92 km^{2} (0.36 sq mi)
- Elevation: 625 m (2,051 ft)

Population (2021)
  - Total: 249
  - Density: 271.8/km^{2} (704/sq mi)
- Time zone: UTC−06:00 (Alberta Time)
- Highways: 45; 857
- Waterways: Withford Lake

Willingdon is a hamlet in central Alberta, Canada within the County of Two Hills No. 21. It is located approximately 117 km (73 mi) northeast of Edmonton, Alberta's capital city.

== History ==
Willingdon originally incorporated as a village on August 31, 1928. It dissolved from village status 89 years later on September 1, 2017, becoming a hamlet under the jurisdiction of the County of Two Hills No. 21.

In 1985, one of the last two traditional wooden grain elevators in Alberta was built in Willingdon by the Alberta Wheat Pool.

== Demographics ==
In the 2021 Census of Population conducted by Statistics Canada, Willingdon had a population of 249 living in 104 of its 159 total private dwellings, a change of −21.9% from its 2016 population of 319. With a land area of 0.92 km^{2} (0.36 sq mi), it had a population density of 270.7/km^{2} (701.0/sq mi) in 2021.

As a designated place in the 2016 Census of Population conducted by Statistics Canada, Willingdon had a population of 319 living in 130 of its 160 total private dwellings, a 16% change from its 2011 population of 275. With a land area of 0.92 km^{2} (0.36 sq mi), it had a population density of 346.7/km^{2} (898.1/sq mi) in 2016.

== See also ==
- List of communities in Alberta
- List of hamlets in Alberta
