= Bridok =

Commune in Chernivtsi Oblast, Ukraine

Coordinates: 48°36′53″N 25°58′37″E

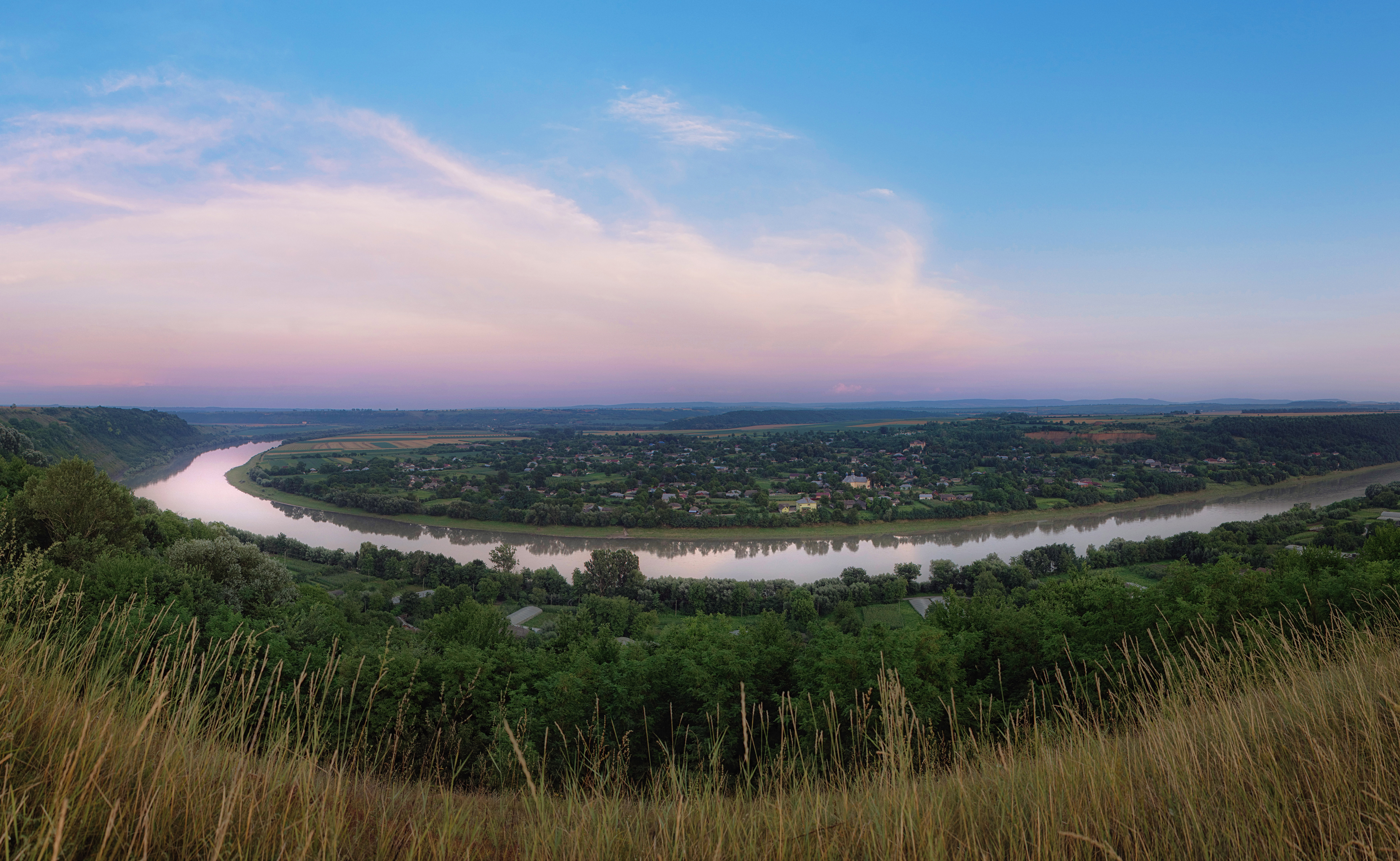
Panorama of the village of Bridok from the road to the village of Kolodribka

Bridok (Ukrainian: Брідок; Romanian: Vadul Nistrului; German: Brodok) is a village in Chernivtsi Raion, Chernivtsi Oblast, Ukraine. It belongs to Vikno rural hromada, one of the hromadas of Ukraine.

According to a census in 2001, the commune hosted 475 inhabitants. At an elevation of 475 meters, the town is located on the shore of the river Dnister.

Until 18 July 2020, Bridok belonged to Zastavna Raion. The raion was abolished in July 2020 as part of the administrative reform of Ukraine, which reduced the number of raions of Chernivtsi Oblast to three. The area of Zastavna Raion was merged into Chernivtsi Raion.
