= Warwick, Alberta =

Community in Alberta, Canada

Coordinates: 53°37′38″N 112°03′08″W

Location of Warwick Alberta

Warwick is an unincorporated community in central Alberta within the County of Minburn No. 27, located 17 kilometres (11 mi) north of Highway 16, 96 kilometres (60 mi) east of Edmonton.

== Climate ==
Climate data for Warwick
| Month | Jan | Feb | Mar | Apr | May | Jun | Jul | Aug | Sep | Oct | Nov | Dec | Year |
|---|---|---|---|---|---|---|---|---|---|---|---|---|---|
| Record high °C (°F) | 10.6 (51.1) | 14 (57) | 17.8 (64.0) | 32.2 (90.0) | 32.8 (91.0) | 36.1 (97.0) | 34 (93) | 33 (91) | 35 (95) | 29 (84) | 18 (64) | 8.5 (47.3) | 36.1 (97.0) |
| Mean daily maximum °C (°F) | −10 (14) | −6.7 (19.9) | −0.2 (31.6) | 10.4 (50.7) | 18.3 (64.9) | 21.4 (70.5) | 22.9 (73.2) | 22.1 (71.8) | 16.1 (61.0) | 10.7 (51.3) | −1.6 (29.1) | −8.4 (16.9) | 7.9 (46.2) |
| Daily mean °C (°F) | −15.6 (3.9) | −12.5 (9.5) | −6 (21) | 4.1 (39.4) | 11.1 (52.0) | 14.6 (58.3) | 16.2 (61.2) | 15 (59) | 9.7 (49.5) | 4.4 (39.9) | −6.4 (20.5) | −13.7 (7.3) | 1.7 (35.1) |
| Mean daily minimum °C (°F) | −21.1 (−6.0) | −18.3 (−0.9) | −11.7 (10.9) | −2.2 (28.0) | 3.9 (39.0) | 7.7 (45.9) | 9.5 (49.1) | 7.9 (46.2) | 3.2 (37.8) | −1.9 (28.6) | −11.3 (11.7) | −19 (−2) | −4.4 (24.1) |
| Record low °C (°F) | −50.6 (−59.1) | −44 (−47) | −41.1 (−42.0) | −32.2 (−26.0) | −10 (14) | −3.3 (26.1) | 0 (32) | −2.2 (28.0) | −10.6 (12.9) | −21.1 (−6.0) | −36 (−33) | −46.7 (−52.1) | −50.6 (−59.1) |
| Average precipitation mm (inches) | 18.8 (0.74) | 13.3 (0.52) | 19.6 (0.77) | 18.6 (0.73) | 42.9 (1.69) | 78.3 (3.08) | 75.1 (2.96) | 57 (2.2) | 44.2 (1.74) | 14.4 (0.57) | 14.5 (0.57) | 23.6 (0.93) | 420.2 (16.54) |
Source: Environment Canada
