= Andrew, Alberta =

Andrew
- Village
- Village of Andrew
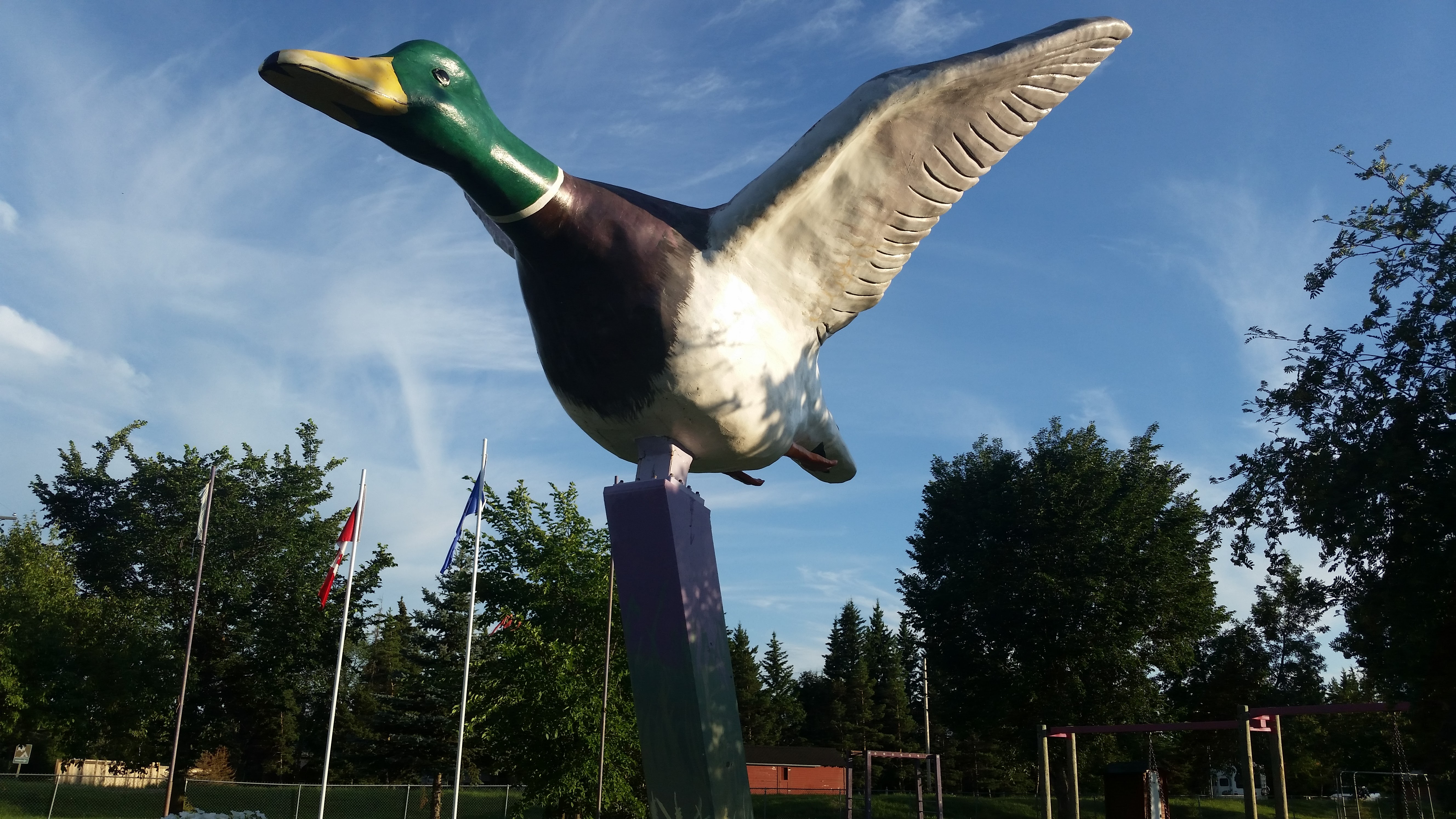
- Andrew roadside attraction mallard

- Location of Andrew in Alberta
- Coordinates: 53°52′48.9″N 112°19′55.3″W
- Country: Canada
- Province: Alberta
- Region: Central Alberta
- Census division: 10
- Municipal districts: Lamont County
- Incorporated
  - Village: June 24, 1930

Area (2021)
  - Land: 1.18 km^{2} (0.46 sq mi)
- Elevation: 610 m (2,000 ft)

Population (2021)
  - Total: 366
  - Density: 310.1/km^{2} (803/sq mi)
- Time zone: UTC−06:00 (Alberta Time)
- Highways: Highway 45; Highway 855
- Website: Official website

Andrew is a village in central Alberta, Canada that is northeast of Edmonton. Andrew is home of the world's largest duck roadside attraction, part of the Giants of the Prairies. Its post office was established March 2, 1902. The community has the name of Andrew Whitford, an early settler.

== Notable people ==
Ed Stelmach became Alberta's premier-elect to succeed Ralph Klein on December 3, 2006. This was the result of the provincial Progressive Conservative Party's election to pick a new leader. Stelmach had been a third-place contender, but came up the middle to win the race over the favoured frontrunners. He officially became the province's premier on December 14, 2006.

== Demographics ==
In the 2021 Census of Population conducted by Statistics Canada, the Village of Andrew had a population of 366 living in 192 of its 238 total private dwellings, a change of −13.9% from its 2016 population of 425. With a land area of 1.18 km^{2} (0.46 sq mi), it had a population density of 310.2/km^{2} (803.3/sq mi) in 2021.

In the 2016 Census of Population conducted by Statistics Canada, the Village of Andrew recorded a population of 425 living in 201 of its 266 total private dwellings, a 12.1% change from its 2011 population of 379. With a land area of 1.17 km^{2} (0.45 sq mi), it had a population density of 363.2/km^{2} (940.8/sq mi) in 2016.

== Climate ==
Climate data for Andrew, Alberta
Month	Jan	Feb	Mar	Apr	May	Jun	Jul	Aug	Sep	Oct	Nov	Dec	Year
Record high °C (°F)	10.0 (50.0)	11.0 (51.8)	16.0 (60.8)	32.2 (90.0)	35.0 (95.0)	37.0 (98.6)	36.0 (96.8)	35.0 (95.0)	33.0 (91.4)	28.5 (83.3)	18.3 (64.9)	10.0 (50.0)	37.0 (98.6)
Mean daily maximum °C (°F)	−8.1 (17.4)	−5.0 (23.0)	0.5 (32.9)	11.3 (52.3)	18.3 (64.9)	21.6 (70.9)	23.5 (74.3)	22.7 (72.9)	16.7 (62.1)	9.3 (48.7)	−1.5 (29.3)	−6.7 (19.9)	8.5 (47.3)
Daily mean °C (°F)	−13.4 (7.9)	−10.6 (12.9)	−5.0 (23.0)	4.7 (40.5)	11.1 (52.0)	15.0 (59.0)	17.0 (62.6)	16.0 (60.8)	10.4 (50.7)	3.7 (38.7)	−6 (21)	−11.8 (10.8)	2.6 (36.7)
Mean daily minimum °C (°F)	−18.7 (−1.7)	−16.2 (2.8)	−10.5 (13.1)	−2.0 (28.4)	3.9 (39.0)	8.4 (47.1)	10.6 (51.1)	9.3 (48.7)	4.0 (39.2)	−2.0 (28.4)	−10.4 (13.3)	−16.7 (1.9)	−3.4 (25.9)
Record low °C (°F)	−44.0 (−47.2)	−45.0 (−49.0)	−38.0 (−36.4)	−26.7 (−16.1)	−10.3 (13.5)	−1.0 (30.2)	2 (36)	−2.0 (28.4)	−8.0 (17.6)	−22.0 (−7.6)	−35.0 (−31.0)	−44.4 (−47.9)	−45.0 (−49.0)
Average precipitation mm (inches)	18.7 (0.74)	10.6 (0.42)	17.3 (0.68)	20.2 (0.80)	37.5 (1.48)	76.3 (3.00)	91.3 (3.59)	56.5 (2.22)	39.3 (1.55)	15.3 (0.60)	14.8 (0.58)	13.7 (0.54)	411.5 (16.20)
Average rainfall mm (inches)	0.2 (0.01)	0.0 (0.0)	0.3 (0.01)	13.3 (0.52)	35.0 (1.38)	76.3 (3.00)	91.3 (3.59)	56.2 (2.21)	39.2 (1.54)	9.7 (0.38)	0.7 (0.03)	0.0 (0.0)	322.1 (12.68)
Average snowfall cm (inches)	18.5 (7.3)	10.6 (4.2)	17.0 (6.7)	7.0 (2.8)	2.5 (1.0)	0 (0)	0 (0)	0.3 (0.1)	0.2 (0.1)	5.6 (2.2)	14.0 (5.5)	13.6 (5.4)	89.3 (35.2)
Average precipitation days (≥ 0.2 mm)	6.5	3.9	4.4	3.9	8.2	12.4	12.9	11.4	9.2	4.7	5.0	5.4	87.9
Average rainy days (≥ 0.2 mm)	0.1	0.0	0.2	2.6	8.1	12.4	12.9	11.4	9.1	3.8	0.5	0.1	61.0
Average snowy days (≥ 0.2 cm)	6.4	3.9	4.2	1.5	0.2	0.0	0.0	0.0	0.2	1.1	4.5	5.3	27.4
Source 1: Environment Canada
Source 2: Precipitation Days Only

== See also ==
- List of communities in Alberta
- List of villages in Alberta
