= Lamont County =

Municipal district in Alberta, Canada

- Municipal district
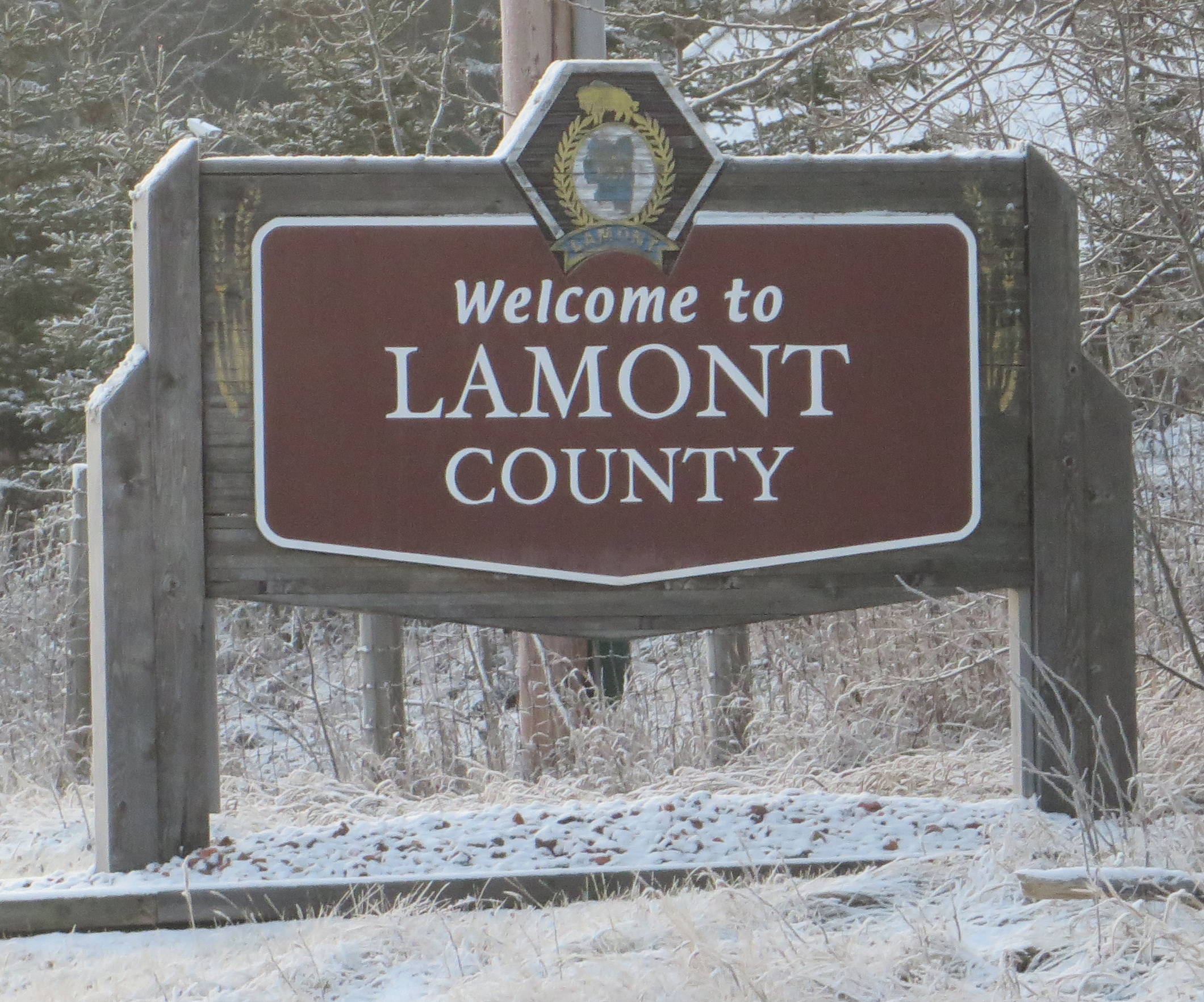
- Welcome sign

- Location within Alberta
- Coordinates: 53°45′37″N 112°46′40″W
- Country: Canada
- Province: Alberta
- Region: Central Alberta
- Census division: 10
- Established: 1944
- Incorporated: 1968

Government
  - Reeve: David Diduck
  - Governing body: Lamont County Council
  - Administrative office: Lamont

Area (2021)
  - Land: 2,385.58 km^{2} (921.08 sq mi)

Population (2021)
  - Total: 3,754
  - Density: 1.6/km^{2} (4.1/sq mi)
- Time zone: UTC−06:00 (Alberta Time)
- Website: lamontcounty.ca

Lamont County is a municipal district in central Alberta, Canada, located in Census Division No. 10, northeast of Edmonton. The county contains 27 Townships. Its municipal office is located in the Town of Lamont.

== History ==
In March 1944, the Municipal District of Lamont No. 516 was incorporated, uniting the three smaller districts of Pines, Wostok, and Leslie. The office was at the town of Lamont and the first council consisted of Peter Moshansky (Reeve), L. Stawnichy, W. Eleniak, M. Cholak and S. Rudko. The first Secretary Treasurer was Michael Nemirsky, who held that position until his death in January 1968. The district was later renamed the Municipal District of Lamont No. 82.

In January 1968, the County of Lamont No. 30 was incorporated, uniting the Lamont School Division No. 18 and the Municipal District of Lamont No. 82.

== Geography ==
=== Communities and localities ===
The following urban municipalities are surrounded by Lamont County.

Cities

- none

Towns

- Bruderheim
- Lamont
- Mundare

Villages

- Andrew
- Chipman

Summer villages

- none

The following hamlets are located within Lamont County.

Hamlets

- Hilliard
- St. Michael
- Star
- Whitford
- Wostok

The following localities are located within Lamont County.

Localities

- Beaverhill
- Bruederheim
- Deerland
- Delph
- Hunka
- Kahwin
- Kraków
- Leeshore
- Luzan
- Peno
- Rodef
- Shandro
- Skaro
- Sniatyn
- Sunland
- Tagore Estates
- Ukalta
- Zawale

== Demographics ==
In the 2021 Census of Population conducted by Statistics Canada, Lamont County had a population of 3,754 living in 1,538 of its 1,829 total private dwellings, a change of −3.3% from its 2016 population of 3,884. With a land area of 2,385.58 km^{2} (921.08 sq mi), it had a population density of 1.6/km^{2} (4.1/sq mi) in 2021.

In the 2016 Census of Population conducted by Statistics Canada, Lamont County had a population of 3,899 living in 1,589 of its 1,919 total private dwellings, a 0.7% change from its 2011 population of 3,872. With a land area of 2,385.09 km^{2} (920.89 sq mi), it had a population density of 1.6/km^{2} (4.2/sq mi) in 2016.

== Attractions ==
Places of interest include Beaverhill Lake, Limestone Creek and Ukalta Sands. The former is popular for the thousands of birds migrating birds around the lake in the months of May and September. Also in Lamont County are the Basilian Fathers Museum and the Skaro Shrine, the site of a spectacular pilgrimage of 5000 people from August 14–15 every year. The Ukrainian Cultural Heritage Village, an open-air museum that depicts the history of east central Alberta, is located on highway 16. Lastly, bordering Lamont County is the Elk Island National Park, Canada's first wildlife sanctuary. The Yellowhead Highway passes through the southern part of the county.

Lamont County has 47 churches - more per capita than anywhere else in North America

The annual Babas and Borshch Ukrainian Festival is held the fourth weekend of August. It honours and celebrates Ukrainian culture – food, history, religion, and arts. From 2013 to 2016 Babas and Borsch was held in the Village of Andrew. In 2017 it was held in the Town of Lamont.

== See also ==
- List of communities in Alberta
- List of municipal districts in Alberta
- List of Canadian place names of Ukrainian origin
