= Ukrainian Greek Orthodox Church of St. Mary (Szypentiz district) =

Church in Alberta, Canada

Coordinates: 53.7715°N 111.8547°W

- Location within Alberta
- Location: Near Hairy Hill, County of Two Hills No. 21, Alberta, Canada
- Country: Canada
- Denomination: Ukrainian Greek Orthodox (Eastern-Rite Orthodox)
- Previous denomination: Russian Orthodox

History
- Status: Church

Architecture
- Functional status: Active/Historic (depending on use)
- Heritage designation: Provincial Historic Resource (Alberta)
- Designated: December 2, 1987
- Architect: Harry Osiecki (designer)
- Groundbreaking: 1917
- Completed: 1917

Specifications
- Materials: Brick

The Ukrainian Greek Orthodox Church of St. Mary (Szypentiz district) is an historic Ukrainian Orthodox Church of Canada congregation and building in a rural district near Two Hills, Alberta. The church was constructed in 1917 after the congregation's previous church was lost in a fire. It is noted for its use of brickwork (whereas most similar rural churches in Alberta are wooden), and interior decoration by Ukrainian-Albertan icon painter Peter Lapinski.

It was named a Provincial Historic Resource in 1987.
