= Bellis, Alberta =

Bellis
- Hamlet
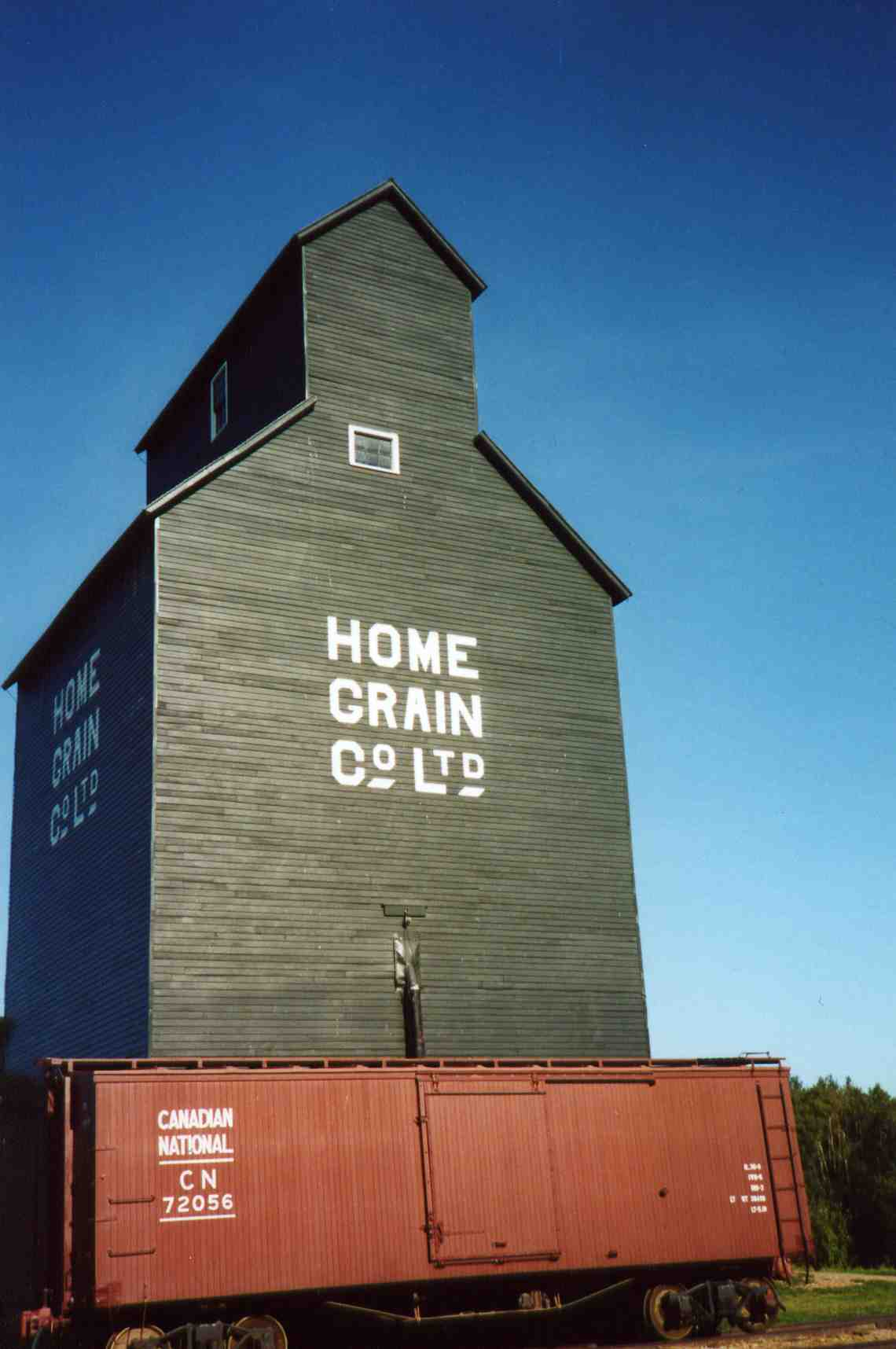
- The Bellis Home Grain Co. Ltd. elevator, which was built in 1920, closed in 1972 and moved in 1980, is now located and preserved on display at the Ukrainian Cultural Heritage Village, east of Edmonton.

- Location of Bellis Bellis (Canada)
- Coordinates: 54°08′34″N 112°09′01″W
- Country: Canada
- Province: Alberta
- Region: Central Alberta
- Census division: 12
- Municipal district: Smoky Lake County

Government
  - Type: Unincorporated
  - Governing body: Smoky Lake County Council

Area (2021)
  - Land: 0.23 km^{2} (0.089 sq mi)

Population (2021)
  - Total: 60
  - Density: 258.6/km^{2} (670/sq mi)
- Time zone: UTC−06:00 (Alberta Time)
- Area codes: 780, 587, 825

Bellis is a hamlet in central Alberta, Canada within Smoky Lake County. Previously an incorporated municipality, Bellis dissolved from village status on January 1, 1946 to become part of the Municipal District of Vilna No. 575.

Bellis is located 8 kilometres (5.0 mi) west of Highway 36, approximately 111 kilometres (69 mi) northeast of Edmonton. The hamlet's name derives from the Ukrainian: Bel lis "white woods", referring to the local birch and poplars. The first settlers arrived in 1898.

== Demographics ==
Population history of Bellis
Year	Pop.	±%
1901		—
1906		—
1911		—
1916		—
1921		—
1926		—
1931	117	—
1936	127	+8.5%
1941	128	+0.8%
1946		—
1951		—
1956		—
1961		—
1966		—
1971		—
1976		—
1981		—
1986		—
1991		—
1996		—
2001		—
2006		—
2011	54	—
2016	50	−7.4%
2021	60	+20.0%
Source: Statistics Canada

In the 2021 Census of Population conducted by Statistics Canada, Bellis had a population of 60 living in 23 of its 33 total private dwellings, a change of 20% from its 2016 population of 50. With a land area of 0.23 km^{2} (0.089 sq mi), it had a population density of 260.9/km^{2} (675.6/sq mi) in 2021.

As a designated place in the 2016 Census of Population conducted by Statistics Canada, Bellis had a population of 50 living in 19 of its 36 total private dwellings, a change of −7.4% from its 2011 population of 54. With a land area of 0.23 km^{2} (0.089 sq mi), it had a population density of 217.4/km^{2} (563.0/sq mi) in 2016.

== See also ==
- List of communities in Alberta
- List of former urban municipalities in Alberta
- List of hamlets in Alberta
