= St. Michael, Alberta =

St. Michael
- Hamlet
- Location of St. Michael St. Michael (Canada)
- Coordinates: 53°49′49″N 112°38′09″W
- Country: Canada
- Province: Alberta
- Region: Central Alberta
- Census division: 10
- Municipal district: Lamont County

Government
  - Type: Unincorporated
  - Governing body: Lamont County Council

Population (1991)
  - Total: 39
- Time zone: UTC−06:00 (Alberta Time)
- Area codes: 780, 587, 825

St. Michael is a hamlet in central Alberta, Canada within Lamont County. It is located 6 kilometres (3.7 mi) north of Highway 29, approximately 42 kilometres (26 mi) northeast of Fort Saskatchewan.

== History ==
The St. Michael Canada Post office permanently closed on November 28, 2014.

== Demographics ==
Population history of St. Michael
Year	Pop.	±%
1941	102	—
1951	342	+235.3%
1956	127	−62.9%
1961	129	+1.6%
1966	97	−24.8%
1971	72	−25.8%
1976	74	+2.8%
1981	64	−13.5%
1986	41	−35.9%
1991	39	−4.9%
Source: Statistics Canada

St. Michael recorded a population of 39 in the 1991 Census of Population conducted by Statistics Canada.

== See also ==
- List of communities in Alberta
- List of hamlets in Alberta
