= Mundare =

- Town
- Town of Mundare
- Location within Alberta
- Coordinates: 53°35′28″N 112°20′11″W
- Country: Canada
- Province: Alberta
- Region: Central Alberta
- Census division: 10
- Municipal district: Lamont County
- Incorporated
  - Village: March 6, 1907
  - Town: January 4, 1951

Government
  - Mayor: Rick Patrie
  - Governing body: Mundare Town Council

Area (2021)
  - Land: 4.12 km^{2} (1.59 sq mi)
- Elevation: 678 m (2,224 ft)

Population (2021)
  - Total: 792
- Time zone: UTC−06:00 (Alberta Time)
- Area code: -1+780
- Highways: Highway 16; Highway 15; Highway 855
- Waterway: Beaverhill Lake
- Website: Official website

Mundare is a town in central Alberta, Canada. It is approximately 70 km (43 mi) east of Edmonton at the intersection of Highway 15 and Highway 855, 2 km (1.2 mi) north of the Yellowhead Highway. The Canadian National Railway tracks run through the town.

Beaverhill Lake lies southwest of the town, and Elk Island National Park is located 30 km (19 mi) west of Mundare.

== History ==
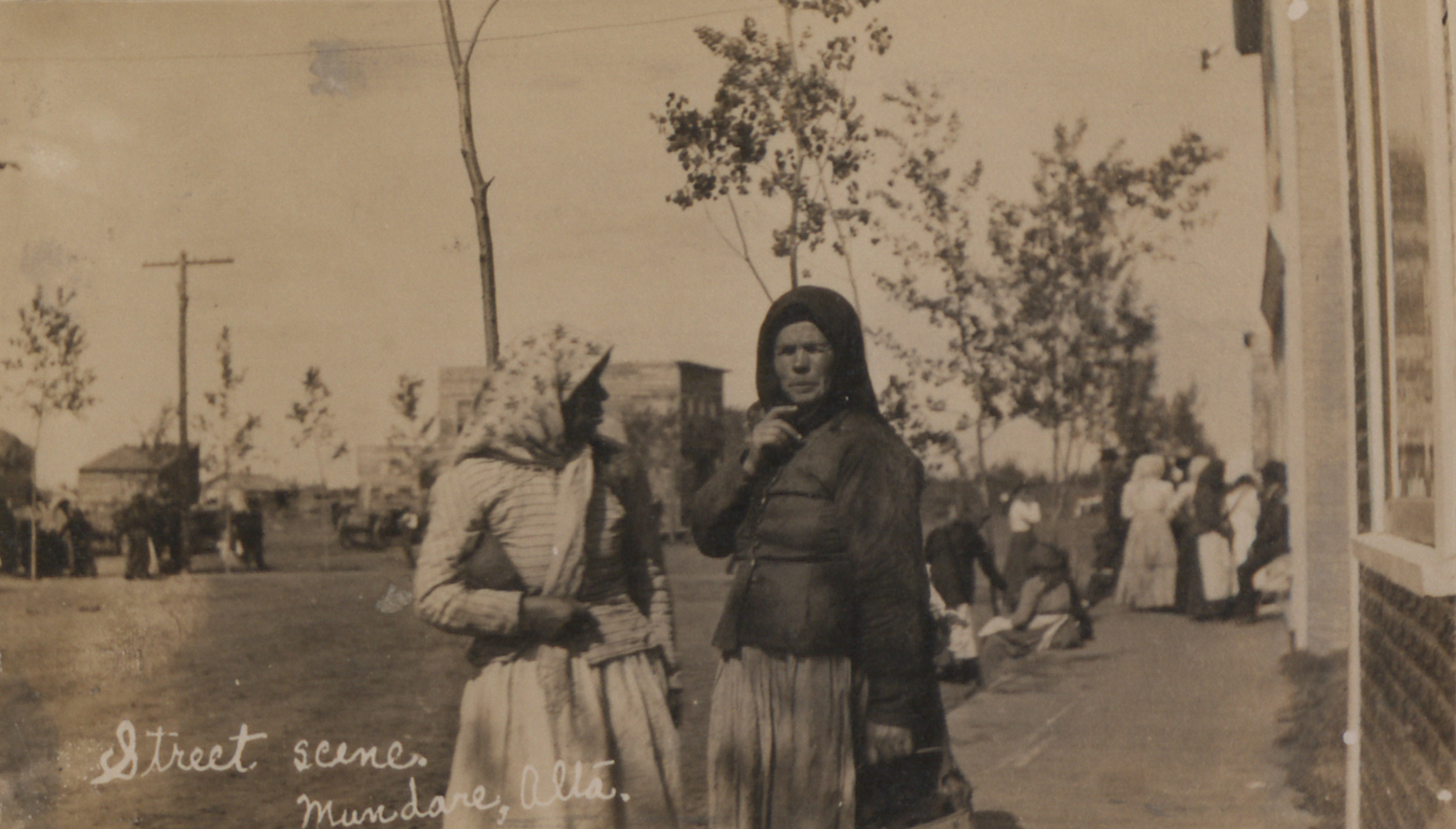
Two Ukrainian women on a street in Mundare, 1911

Mundare was named after William Mundare, a railway station agent. In July 2007, the town marked its 100th anniversary with a three-day celebration.

== Demographics ==
In the 2021 Census of Population conducted by Statistics Canada, the Town of Mundare had a population of 792 living in 348 of its 395 total private dwellings, a change of −7% from its 2016 population of 852. With a land area of 4.12 km^{2} (1.59 sq mi), it had a population density of 192.2/km^{2} (497.9/sq mi) in 2021.

In the 2016 Census of Population conducted by Statistics Canada, the Town of Mundare recorded a population of 852 living in 359 of its 390 total private dwellings, a −0.4% change from its 2011 population of 855. With a land area of 4.21 km^{2} (1.63 sq mi), it had a population density of 202.4/km^{2} (524.1/sq mi) in 2016.

== Attractions ==
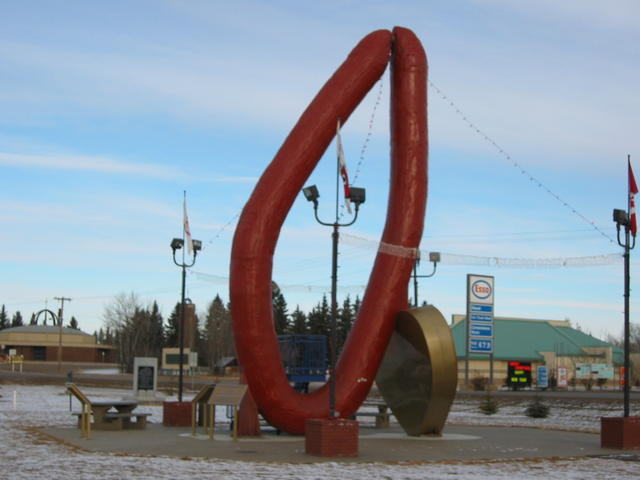
Giant kovbasa in Mundare

Mundare is host to The Basilian Fathers' Museum that presents the history of the Ukrainian settlement and Basilian Fathers' Mission in east-central Alberta. It holds a unique collection of 16th- and 17th-century liturgical books from Ukraine. The museum is off of the highway 855 that borders the eastern part of town and is across from the "Grotto" called the "Golgotha of Mundare", an elegant garden and shrine that was built by the Basilian Fathers in 1934.

It is also home of the world's largest sculpture of a garlic sausage (kielbasa or kovbasa), which cost about $120,000 to build and erect.

== Notable people ==
- Albert Bandura, psychologist
- Evelyn Roth, artist

== See also ==
- List of communities in Alberta
- List of towns in Alberta
