= Smoky Lake County =

Municipal district in Alberta, Canada

- Municipal district

- Location within Alberta
- Coordinates: 54°07′15″N 112°28′24″W
- Country: Canada
- Province: Alberta
- Region: Central Alberta
- Census division: 12
- Established: 1943
- Incorporated: 1961 (County)

Government
  - Reeve: Lorne Halisky
  - Governing body: Smoky Lake County Council
  - Administrative office: Smoky Lake

Area (2021)
  - Land: 3,396.29 km^{2} (1,311.31 sq mi)

Population (2021)
  - Total: 3,874
  - Density: 1.1/km^{2} (2.8/sq mi)
- Time zone: UTC−06:00 (Alberta Time)
- Area code: 780
- Website: smokylakecounty.ab.ca

Smoky Lake County is a municipal district in north-eastern Alberta, Canada. Located in Census Division No. 12, its municipal office is located in the Town of Smoky Lake.

== Geography ==
=== Communities and localities ===
The following urban municipalities are surrounded by Smoky Lake County.

Cities

- none

Towns

- Smoky Lake

Villages

- Vilna
- Waskatenau

Summer villages

- none

The following hamlets are located within Smoky Lake County.

Hamlets

- Bellis
- Edwand
- Spedden
- Warspite (dissolved from village status in June 2000)

The following Métis settlements are located within Smoky Lake County.

- Buffalo Lake
- Kikino

The following localities are located within Smoky Lake County.

Localities

- Anning
- Barich
- Birchland Resort
- Bonnie Lake Resort
- Cache Lake
- Cadron
- Cossack
- Downing
- Hamlin
- Kikino
- Lobstick Settlement
- Mons Lake

- Mons Lake Estates
- Mons View Resort

- North Kotzman
- Northbank
- Pakan
- Parkview Beach
- Sprucefield
- Stry
- Two Lakes
- Victoria Settlement (also Fort Victoria)
- Wahstao
- Wasel
- Whiteman Beach

== Demographics ==
As a census subdivision in the 2021 Census of Population conducted by Statistics Canada, Smoky Lake County had a population of 3,874 living in 1,500 of its 1,913 total private dwellings, a change of −5.7% from its 2016 population of 4,107. With a land area of 3,396.29 km^{2} (1,311.31 sq mi), it had a population density of 1.1/km^{2} (3.0/sq mi) in 2021.

As a census subdivision in the 2016 Census of Population conducted by Statistics Canada, Smoky Lake County had a population of 4,107 living in 1,556 of its 2,248 total private dwellings, a 5% change from its 2011 population of 3,910. This includes the population of two Métis settlements, Buffalo Lake (712) and Kikino (934), located within the census subdivision that are municipalities independent of Smoky Lake County. With a land area of 3,412.92 km^{2} (1,317.74 sq mi), the census subdivision had a population density of 1.2/km^{2} (3.1/sq mi) in 2016. Excluding the two Métis settlements, Smoky Lake County had a population of 2,461 in 2016, a change of 0.1% from its 2011 population of 2,459.

== See also ==
- List of communities in Alberta
