= Hairy Hill =

- Hamlet
- Location of Hairy Hill Hairy Hill (Canada)
- Coordinates: 53°45′48″N 111°58′43″W
- Country: Canada
- Province: Alberta
- Region: Central Alberta
- Census division: 10
- Municipal district: County of Two Hills No. 21

Government
  - Type: Unincorporated
  - Governing body: County of Two Hills No. 21 Council

Population (2001)
  - Total: 30
- Time zone: UTC−06:00 (Alberta Time)
- Area codes: 780, 587, 825

Hairy Hill is a hamlet in Alberta, Canada within the County of Two Hills No. 21. It is located on Highway 45, approximately 18 kilometres (11 mi) from Two Hills and 102 kilometres (63 mi) east of Edmonton.

== Toponymy ==
Hairy Hill was named by early settlers after they observed mysterious large mats of hair on the ground. Once spring began, the hair proved to be shed by passing bison, which removed their winter coats by rubbing against trees on the hill. Early settlers also used bison hair to insulate their clothing and homes.

== Topography ==
Hairy Hill is situated upon a gently sloping hill with a relatively flat top. It lies on glacial deposits left by dead ice, forming an uneven hummocky landscape. Terrain in the area is characterized by poorly-draining humic gley soils. Soils are also salty and high in carbonate content, rendering them better suited for producing forage crops than cereal crops.

=== Ecology ===
The most common trees are trembling aspen. Common fauna include skunks, porcupines, and white-tailed deer, along with meadow voles and masked shrews. Hairy Hill also contains populations of Tennessee warblers and Lincoln's sparrows.

== History ==
=== Pre-settlement ===
Hairy Hill falls within the traditional territories of the Cree and Blackfoot peoples. The two groups staged battles in the area, with the latest occurring around 1879. Archaeologists have found arrowheads and stone axes, as well as evidence of camp and battle sites, from Indigenous peoples.

=== Settlement and Early growth: 1900–1927 ===
Settlement began in the Hairy Hill area around the early 20th century. Many early residents of Hairy Hill and the nearby settlement of Boian were Romanians who hailed from Boiany, Bukovina; families from Russia and Ukraine were also well-represented.

The community was initially identified by the name of its post office, Soda Lake, which opened in November 1903. The office's name derived from a nearby alkaline lake that has since evaporated. Soda Lake School District was established in October 1904 for the purposes of building a school to serve local families.

In February 1907, a new post office also named Soda Lake opened closer to its namesake, resulting in the original post office changing its name to Hairy Hill.

In 1911, tensions between Romanian and Russian-speaking members of the Eastern Orthodox Church in nearby Boian came to a head, as the Romanian parishioners hoped to receive sermons in their native language. Some of the Romanian settlers constructed the Biserica Ortodoxă Română Nașterea Fecioarei Maria ("Romanian Orthodox Church of the Nativity of the Virgin Mary") in Hairy Hill, which began serving the community in 1914.

=== Railway and height of development: 1928–1959 ===
The Canadian Pacific Railway built a line through the community in 1928, which generated a population boom. At this time, 23 families living in Hairy Hill spoke English, constituting a minority; the population was predominantly Ukrainian. Hairy Hill received several stores and six grain elevators within a few years of the railway's arrival, as well as an influx of settlers from nearby localities. The Soda Lake School District became the Hairy Hill School District on March 8, 1929, and began building a new, larger schoolhouse that year.

The Farmers' Unity League, modelled after the communist Workers' Unity League, established a presence in Hairy Hill in the 1930s. Local producers participated in a farmers' strike in November 1934, preventing grain from being delivered to Hairy Hill's grain elevators, until the RCMP intervened. Hairy Hill Community Hall opened by 1939.

In the 1940s, resident Steve Bidulock purchased a lumber yard operating in Hairy Hill, which he converted into a general store under the name Bid's General Supplies. Bidulock became fluent in English, Romanian, and Ukrainian to better serve Hairy Hill's largest ethnic groups. A local history would later describe Bidulock's business as Hairy Hill's "hub", with wares ranging from car insurance to everyday essentials. By 1946, Hairy Hill recorded a population of 235, and was subsequently granted village status by the Government of Alberta. Hairy Hill's population peaked at 250 in 1948.

=== Decline: 1960–2000 ===
Passenger rail services through Hairy Hill were discontinued in 1965, though freight services continued. By 1970, Hairy Hill's population stood at around 136. Around this time, its Romanian Orthodox church no longer received a permanent priest, as the dwindling number of attendees opted to join the church in Boian. Hairy Hill's church reduced its services to sermons on select holy days for some years afterwards.

In June 1982, Hairy Hill School closed, and remaining students transferred to Two Hills School. In 1984, after more than 40 years of operations, Steve Bidulock's general store was burned down by an arsonist. One local history cited the loss of Bidulock's business as the incident that sealed Hairy Hill's decline, as district locals began travelling to other localities for supplies.

Hairy Hill hosted the first annual Hairy Hill Rodeo in 1990.

=== Dissolution of village: 1991–2000 ===
By 1992, the hamlet recorded a population of 69, earning the distinction of being Alberta's smallest village. Its governing council consisted of three officials. After a provincial report concluded that Hairy Hill had "no prospects for real growth," resident Steve Bidulock circulated a petition for the village to dissolve and fall under the jurisdiction of the County of Two Hills, believing the county was better equipped to manage Hairy Hill.

A plebiscite held in September asked Hairy Hill's 46 eligible voters whether they wanted to dissolve from village status and fall under the jurisdiction of the County of Two Hills instead. 60% of the 42 votes cast favoured retaining village status. Nonetheless, the village's population reached a low of 54 in 1993, and the provincial government's plan to cut village funding forced Hairy Hill's council to revisit joining the County of Two Hills in October 1996. Hairy Hill became a hamlet under county jurisdiction by the end of the year.

Also in 1996, a Dariusleut colony, the Hairy Hill Hutterite Colony, was founded near the hamlet. Hairy Hill's grain elevators ceased operations by the end of the decade, and its railway tracks were removed.

=== 21st century: 2001–present ===
As of the 21st century, Hairy Hill is a small farming and residential community. Hairy Hill Rodeo celebrated its 25th anniversary in July 2013. 360 contestants competed before an audience of over 1,000 spectators.

In March 2024, the federal and provincial governments announced a multi-million-dollar investment in bringing high-speed Internet access to rural Albertan communities, including Hairy Hill.

== Demographics ==
Hairy Hill recorded a population of 30 in the 2001 Census of Population conducted by Statistics Canada.

== Services and commerce ==
=== Services ===
Hairy Hill is served by a post office and fire department. The hamlet also contains a waste transfer site, and a bulk water and truck fill station, both administered by the County of Two Hills.

=== Commercial operations ===
The Growing Power Hairy Hill Integrated bioRefinery, a biorefinery that converts agricultural waste and surpluses into low-carbon ethanol and renewable electricity, began operating in 2011. The plant receives inputs from local farmers and generates clean energy in return, alongside organic fertilizer.

== Places of interest ==
=== Cemeteries ===
As of the 21st century, Hairy Hill's Church of the Nativity of the Virgin Mary is in a state of disuse. Its cemetery remains accessible to the public, as does the Hairy Hill Protestant Union Cemetery.

== Culture ==
=== Hairy Hill Rodeo ===
Since 1990, the hamlet has hosted Hairy Hill Rodeo, an annual exhibition and fair that typically occurs in July.

=== Hairy Hill Community Hall ===
The hamlet's community centre, Hairy Hill Community Hall, serves as an event venue. The Hairy Hill Elks of Canada lodge meets in the hall.

== In media ==
=== Film ===
The 2023 animated short film Return to Hairy Hill depicts Hairy Hill as home to supernatural elements. Co-created by director Daniel Gies and writer Emily Paige, the film is based on the life of Gies' grandmother Marie-Anne Ethel Garnier, who was born in Hairy Hill in 1940.

== Notable residents ==
- William Yurko (1926 – 2010) – World War II veteran and provincial and federal politician, born in Hairy Hill.
- Stanley Howard Knowles (1908 – 1997) – theologian and politician who conducted a mission to Hairy Hill for the Alberta Baptist Convention in 1928.

== See also ==
- List of communities in Alberta
- List of former urban municipalities in Alberta
- List of hamlets in Alberta
