= Grammy Award for Best Album Notes =

Music award

- Awarded for: Quality album liner notes
- Country: United States
- Presented by: National Academy of Recording Arts and Sciences
- First award: 1964
- Currently held by: Ashley Kahn – Miles '55: The Prestige Recordings (2026)
- Website: grammy.com

The Grammy Award – Best Album Notes has been presented since 1964. From 1973 to 1976 (the 15th through 18th Awards), a second award was presented for Best Album Notes – Classical. Those awards are listed under those years below. The award recognizes albums with excellent album notes, sometimes referred to as liner notes. It is presented to the album notes author or authors, not to the artists or performers on the winning work, except if the artist is also the album notes author.

Years reflect the year in which the Grammy Awards were presented, for works released in the previous year.

== Winners and nominees ==
=== 1960s ===
Year^{[I]}	Work	Recipient(s)	Performing artist(s)
1964
1964	The Ellington Era	Stanley Dance and Leonard Feather	Duke Ellington
1964	The Amazing Amanda Ambrose	Bob Bollard	Amanda Ambrose
1964	The Badmen	Benjamin A. Botkin, James L. Horan, Harold Preece and Sylvester L. Vigilante	Pete Seeger and Others
1964	The Barbra Streisand Album	Harold Arlen	Barbra Streisand
1964	An Evening of Elizabethan Music	Sidney Bock	Julian Bream
1964	Who's Afraid of Virginia Woolf?	Edward Albee and Harold Clurman	Original Cast
1965
1965	Mexico (Legacy Collection)	Carleton Beals and Stanton Catlin	Carlos Chávez
1965	Beyond the Fringe '64	Alexander Cohen	Original Cast
1965	The Definitive Piaf	Rory Guy	Édith Piaf
1965	Getz/Gilberto	Stan Getz, João Gilberto and Gene Lees	Stan Getz and João Gilberto
1965	Mahler: Symphony No. 5 in a C Sharp Minor/Berg: Wozzeck Excerpts	Neville Cardus	Erich Leinsdorf
1965	Quincy Jones Explores the Music of Henry Mancini	Jack Tracy	Quincy Jones
1965	The Young Chevalier	George Sponholtz	Maurice Chevalier
1966
1966	September of My Years	Stan Cornyn	Frank Sinatra
1966	Berg: Wozzeck	Otto Gerdes and Gustav Rudolf Sellner	Karl Böhm conducting Orchestra of German Opera - Berlin
1966	Father and Son	Charles Lamb	Hank Williams and Hank Williams Jr.
1966	Grand Terrace Band	Stanley Dance	Earl Hines
1966	The Voice of the Uncommon Man	Dom Cerulli	Adlai Stevenson
1967
1967	Sinatra at the Sands	Stan Cornyn	Frank Sinatra
1967	Ben Colder Strikes Again	Harvey Cowen	Ben Colder
1967	Doctor Zhivago	Nelson Lyon	Maurice Jarre
1967	Edward R. Murrow: A Reporter Remembers, Vol. I — The War Years	Fred Friendly	Edward R. Murrow
1967	The Ellington Era, Vol. II	Stanley Dance and Ralph J. Gleason	Duke Ellington
1968
1968	Suburban Attitudes in Country Verse	John D. Loudermilk	John D. Loudermilk
1968	The Earth	Rod McKuen	Rod McKuen and Anita Kerr
1968	Extra Special!	Rory Guy	Peggy Lee
1968	The Far East Suite	Stanley Dance	Duke Ellington
1968	Francis Albert Sinatra & Antonio Carlos Jobim	Stan Cornyn	Frank Sinatra and Antonio Carlos Jobim
1968	Listen!	Richard Oliver	Gary Lewis and the Playboys
1969
1969	Johnny Cash at Folsom Prison	Johnny Cash	Johnny Cash
1969	Anthology of Indian Music, Volume One	Richard Oliver	Ravi Shankar, Ali Akbar Khan and Balachander
1969	Ethel Waters on Stage and Screen 1925-1940	Miles Kreuger	Ethel Waters
1969	Francis A. & Edward K.	Stan Cornyn	Frank Sinatra and Duke Ellington
1969	Pete Seeger's Greatest Hits	Pete Seeger	Pete Seeger

=== 1970s ===
Year^{[I]}	Work	Recipient(s)	Performing artist(s)
1970
1970	Nashville Skyline	Johnny Cash	Bob Dylan
1970	Chicago Mess Around	John Dodds II	Johnny Dodds
1970	David's Album	Joan Baez	Joan Baez
1970	John Hartford	John Hartford	John Hartford
1970	Mabel Mercer and Bobby Short at Town Hall	Rex Reed	Mabel Mercer and Bobby Short
1971
1971	The World's Greatest Blues Singer	Chris Albertson	Bessie Smith
1971	As I See It	Billy Edd Wheeler	Jack Moran
1971	Bitches Brew	Ralph J. Gleason	Miles Davis
1971	Hold Back the World	Rod McKuen	Alexander's Greyhound Bass
1971	I Do Not Play No Rock 'n Roll	Anthony D'Oberoff	Mississippi Fred McDowell
1971	Judy. London. 1969.	Rex Reed	Judy Garland
1971	Sixteen All Time Greatest Hits	James Goodfriend	Bill Monroe and the Blue Grass Boys
1971	They Shoot Horses, Don't They?	Arthur Knight	John Green Orchestra
1972
1972	Sam, Hard and Heavy	Sam Samudio	Sam the Sham
1972	The Genius of Louis Armstrong	Don DeMicheal	Louis Armstrong
1972	Honky Tonkin' with Charlie Walker	Tom West	Charlie Walker
1972	Louis Armstrong: July 4, 1900—July 6, 1971	Nat Hentoff	Louis Armstrong
1972	Miles Davis	Colman Andrews	Miles Davis
1972	Music of Varese	James Lyons	Konstantin Simonovitch
1972	Piano Rags by Scott Joplin	Joshua Rifkin	Joshua Rifkin
1972	This Is Benny Goodman	George T. Simon	Benny Goodman
1973	Best Album Notes		
1973	Tom T. Hall's Greatest Hits	Tom T. Hall	Tom T. Hall
1973	Bunny Berigan, His Trumpet and His Orchestra, Volume 1	Dan Morgenstern	Bunny Berigan
1973	Lenny Bruce: Carnegie Hall	Albert Goldman	Lenny Bruce
1973	Let My Children Hear Music	Charlie Mingus	Charlie Mingus
1973	Super Chief	Michael Brooks	Count Basie
1973	Best Album Notes — Classical		
1973	Vaughan Williams: Symphony No. 2 (A London Symphony)	James Lyons	André Previn
1973	Berlioz: Benvenuto Cellini	David Cairns	Colin Davis
1973	Haydn: Symphonies (Complete), Vols. 4 and 5	H. C. Robbins Landon	Antal Doráti
1973	John Ogdon Plays Alkan	Sacheverell Sitwell	John Ogdon
1973	Julian and John	Tom Eastwood	Julian Bream and John Williams
1973	Michael Rabin: In Memoriam	Karolynne Gee	Michael Rabin
1973	String Quartets of the New Viennese School	Ursula von Rauchhaupt	LaSalle Quartet
1974	Best Album Notes		
1974	God Is in the House	Dan Morgenstern	Art Tatum
1974	Lonesome, On'ry and Mean	Chet Flippo	Waylon Jennings
1974	Ol' Blue Eyes Is Back	Stan Cornyn	Frank Sinatra
1974	Remember Marilyn	Lionel Newman	Marilyn Monroe
1974	This Is Jimmie Rodgers	William Ivey	Jimmie Rodgers
1974	Best Album Notes — Classical		
1974	Hindemith: Sonatas for Piano	Glenn Gould	Glenn Gould
1974	Bach: Brandenburg Concerti	Erik Smith	Neville Marriner
1974	Berio: Recital 1 (For Cathy)	Misha Donat	Cathy Berberian
1974	Bizet: Carmen	Harvey Phillips	Leonard Bernstein
1974	Debussy: La mer/Prélude à l'après-midi d'un faune and Ravel: Daphnis and Chloe Suite #2	Clair W. Van Ausdall	Eugene Ormandy
1974	Dvorák: Piano Quartet in E Flat Major, Op. 87	Irving Kolodin	Guarneri Quartet and Arthur Rubinstein
1974	Haydn: Symphony No. 20 in C Major – Symphony No. 35 in B Flat	H. C. Robbins Landon	Antal Doráti
1974	Haydn: Symphony No. 36 and Symphony No. 48	H. C. Robbins Landon	Antal Doráti
1974	Rachmaninov: Concerto No. 2 in C Minor for Piano	Alan Rich	Eugene Ormandy and Arthur Rubinstein
1974	The Woods So Wild	Tom Eastwood	Julian Bream
1975	Best Album Notes		
1975	For the Last Time (TIE)	Charles R. Townsend	Bob Wills & His Texas Playboys
1975	The Hawk Flies (TIE)	Dan Morgenstern	Coleman Hawkins
1975	50 Years of Film Music (Original Motion Picture Soundtrack Recordings)	Rudy Behlmer	Various Artists
1975	The Pianist	Ralph J. Gleason	Duke Ellington
1975	The World Is Still Waiting for the Sunrise	J.R. Young	Les Paul and Mary Ford
1975	Best Album Notes — Classical		
1975	Korngold: The Classic Erich Wolfgang Korngold	Rory Guy	Willy Mattes and Ulf Hoelscher
1975	Berlioz: The Damnation of Faust	David Cairns	Colin Davis
1975	Citizen Kane: The Classic Film Scores of Bernard Herrmann	Christopher Palmer	Various Artists
1975	Humperdinck: Hansel and Gretel	George Jellinek	Kurt Eichhorn
1975	Mahler: Symphony No. 10	Deryck Cooke	Wyn Morris
1975	Mozart: Don Giovanni	Erik Smith	Colin Davis
1975	Rachmaninoff: The Bells and Three Russian Songs	Clair W. Van Ausdall	Eugene Ormandy
1975	Scriabin: Piano Music (Complete), Volume II	Donald Garvelmann	Michael Ponti
1975	Verdi: I Vespri Siciliani	Irving Kolodin	James Levine
1975	Weber: Der Freischütz	Wolfram Schwinger	Erich Kleiber
1976	Best Album Notes		
1976	Blood on the Tracks	Pete Hamill	Bob Dylan
1976	Greatest Hits, Vol. 2	Tom T. Hall	Tom T. Hall
1976	A Legendary Performer: Glenn Miller and His Orchestra	George T. Simon	Glenn Miller
1976	The Real Lenny Bruce	Ralph J. Gleason	Lenny Bruce
1976	The Tatum Solo Masterpieces	Benny Green	Art Tatum
1976	Best Album Notes — Classical		
1976	Footlifters	Gunther Schuller	Gunther Schuller
1976	The English Harpsichord (Byrd, Farnaby, Etc.)	Judith Robison	Igor Kipnis
1976	Gagliano: La Dafne	James H. Moore	Paul Vorwerk
1976	Gershwin: Gershwin's S'wonderful	Rory Guy	Ralph Grierson and Artie Kane
1976	Haydn: Symphonies 93–104	H. C. Robbins Landon	Antal Doráti
1976	Joplin: The Complete Works of Scott Joplin	Rudi Blesh	Dick Hyman
1976	Joplin: The Easy Winners	Rory Guy and Itzhak Perlman	Itzhak Perlman and André Previn
1976	Kodály: Orchestral Works (Complete)	Laszlo Eosze	Antal Doráti
1976	Korngold: Die Tote Stadt	Christopher Palmer	Erich Leinsdorf
1977
1977	The Changing Face of Harlem: Savoy Sessions	Dan Morgenstern	Various Artists
1977	Beethoven: The Five Piano Concertos	George R. Marek	Daniel Barenboim and Arthur Rubinstein
1977	The Blue Sky Boys	Douglas B. Green	Bill and Earl Bolick
1977	Caruso: A Legendary Performer	Francis Robinson	Enrico Caruso
1977	The Complete Tommy Dorsey, Volume 1 – 1935	Mort Goode	Tommy Dorsey
1978
1978	Bing Crosby: A Legendary Performer	George T. Simon	Bing Crosby
1978	Flight Log	Patrick Snyder	Jefferson Airplane
1978	Guy Lombardo: A Legendary Performer	George T. Simon	Guy Lombardo
1978	The Lester Young Story, Vol. I	Michael Brooks	Lester Young
1978	Stormy Blues	Chris Albertson	Billie Holiday
1979
1979	A Bing Crosby Collection, Vols. I and II	Michael Brooks	Bing Crosby
1979	Beethoven: 9 Symphonies	Bill Bender and Irving Kolodin	Herbert von Karajan
1979	Ellington at Carnegie Hall, 1943	Leonard Feather	Duke Ellington
1979	Georgia Sea Island Songs	Alan Lomax	Various Artists
1979	The Individualism of Pee Wee Russell	Dan Morgenstern	Pee Wee Russell
1979	Works of Carpenter/Gilbert/Weiss/Powell	David Baker and R. D. Darrell	Calvin Simmons, Lawrence Foster and Los Angeles Philharmonic

=== 1980s ===
Year^{[I]}	Work	Recipient(s)	Performing artist(s)
1980
1980	Charlie Parker: The Complete Savoy Sessions	James Patrick and Bob Porter	Charlie Parker
1980	Billie Holiday (Giants of Jazz)	Melvin Maddocks	Billie Holiday
1980	Duke Ellington (Giants of Jazz)	Stanley Dance and Dan Morgenstern	Duke Ellington
1980	Hoagy Carmichael: A Legendary Performer and Composer	Richard M. Sudhalter	Hoagy Carmichael
1980	The Magical Music of Walt Disney	Dick Schory	Various Artists
1981
1981	Trilogy: Past Present Future	David McClintock	Frank Sinatra
1981	Atlanta Blues: 1933	Bruce Bastin and David Evans	Blind Willie McTell, Curley Weaver and Buddy Moss
1981	Chicago Concert, 1956	Dan Morgenstern	Louis Armstrong
1981	Elvis Aron Presley	Lorene Lortie	Elvis Presley
1981	Lester Young (Giants of Jazz)	John McDonough and Richard M. Sudhalter	Lester Young
1982
1982	Erroll Garner: Master of the Keyboard	Dan Morgenstern	Erroll Garner
1982	Fats Waller (Giants of Jazz)	Philip W. Payne and David Thomson	Fats Waller
1982	James P. Johnson (Giants of Jazz)	Frank Kappler, Willa Rouder and Dick Wellstood	James P. Johnson
1982	The Mario Lanza Collection	Chick Crumpacker	Mario Lanza
1982	Pee Wee Russell (Giants of Jazz)	John McDonough	Pee Wee Russell
1983
1983	Bunny Berigan (Giants of Jazz)	John Chilton and Richard M. Sudhalter	Bunny Berigan
1983	Duke Ellington 1941	Gary Giddins	Duke Ellington and His Orchestra
1983	An Experiment in Modern Music: Paul Whiteman at Aeolian Hall	Thornton Hagert	Paul Whiteman
1983	The Greatest Country Music Recordings of All Time	William Ivey	Various Artists
1983	Sixty Years of Country Music	William Ivey and Bob Pinson	Various Artists
1983	Young Blood	Robert Palmer	The Coasters
1984
1984	The Interplay Sessions	Orrin Keepnews	Bill Evans
1984	The Fugs Greatest Hits, Vol. I	Lester Bangs	The Fugs
1984	The Okeh Sessions	Peter Guralnick	Big Maybelle
1984	Joe Sullivan (Giants of Jazz)	Richard B. Hadlock	Joe Sullivan
1984	Seven Come Eleven	John McDonough	Benny Goodman
1985
1985	Big Band Jazz	Gunther Schuller and Martin Williams	Various Artists
1985	Amadeus (Original Soundtrack Recording)	Grover Sales	Neville Marriner
1985	An Anthology of Sacred Carols for Classical Guitar	James Sundquist	James Sundquist
1985	A Golden Celebration	Lorene Lortie and Z Factor	Elvis Presley
1985	Virginia Traditions/Virginia Work Songs (Field Recordings 1936-1980)	Glenn Hinson	Various Artists
1986
1986	Sam Cooke Live at the Harlem Square Club, 1963	Peter Guralnick	Sam Cooke
1986	American Popular Song	Dwight Blocker Bowers and James R. Morris	Various Artists
1986	Bleecker and McDougal: The Folk Scene of the 60's	Lenny Kaye	Various Artists
1986	Crossroads: White Blues in the 1960s	Lenny Kaye	Various Artists
1986	The Girl from Ipanema: The Bossa Nova Years	Neil Tesser	Stan Getz
1987
1987	The Voice: The Columbia Years 1943–1952	Frank Conroy, Gary Giddins, Stephen Holden, Murray Kempton, Andrew Sarris, Jonathan Schwartz and Wilfrid Sheed	Frank Sinatra
1987	Biograph	Cameron Crowe	Bob Dylan
1987	Elektrock: The Sixties	Lenny Kaye	Various Artists
1987	The Mapleson Cylinders	David Hall, David Hamilton, Tom Owen, John Stratton and Robert Tuggle	Various Metropolitan Opera Artists
1987	Virtuosi	Richard Freed and Peter Eliot Stone	Various Artists
1988
1988	Thelonious Monk: The Complete Riverside Recordings	Orrin Keepnews	Thelonious Monk
1988	The Bristol Sessions	Charles K. Wolfe	Various Artists
1988	The Complete Sun Sessions	Peter Guralnick	Elvis Presley
1988	Jimmie Rodgers on Record: America's Blue Yodeler	Nolan Porterfield	Jimmie Rodgers
1988	Singers and Soloists of the Swing Bands	Mark Tucker	Various Artists
1989
1989	Crossroads	Anthony DeCurtis	Eric Clapton
1989	The Classic Hoagy Carmichael	John Edward Hasse	Hoagy Carmichael
1989	The Complete Commodore Jazz Recordings, Vol. I	Dan Morgenstern	Various Artists
1989	Show Boat	Miles Kreuger	John McGlinn, Frederica von Stade, Jerry Hadley and Teresa Stratas
1989	Virginia Traditions: Southwest Virginia Blues	Vaughn Webb	Various Artists

=== 1990s ===
Year^{[I]}	Work	Recipient(s)	Performing artist(s)
1990
1990	Bird: The Complete Charlie Parker on Verve	Phil Schaap	Charlie Parker
1990	American Musical Theater: Shows, Songs and Stars	Dwight Blocker Bowers	Various Artists
1990	The Complete Fantasy Recordings	Gene Lees	Bill Evans
1990	Jazz Piano	Francis Davis, Dick Katz and Martin Williams	Various Artists
1990	Now That's a Good Tune	Howard Wight Marshall, Amy Skillman and Charles Walden	Masters of Traditional Missouri Fiddling
1991
1991	Brownie: The Complete Emarcy Recordings of Clifford Brown	Dan Morgenstern	Clifford Brown
1991	Art Pepper: The Complete Galaxy Recordings	Gary Giddins	Art Pepper
1991	Bo Diddley: The Chess Box	Robert Palmer	Bo Diddley
1991	The Jack Kerouac Collection	David Perry	Jack Kerouac
1991	Muddy Waters: The Chess Box	Mary Katherine Aldin and Robert Palmer	Muddy Waters
1992
1992	Star Time	James Brown, Nelson George, Alan M. Leeds, Harry Weinger and Cliff White	James Brown
1992	The Birth of Soul	Robert Palmer	Ray Charles
1992	The Bootleg Series Volumes 1-3 (Rare and Unreleased)	John Bauldie	Bob Dylan
1992	The Complete Stax/Volt Singles 1959–1968	Rob Bowman	Various Artists
1992	The Original Singles Collection...Plus	Colin Escott	Hank Williams
1993
1993	Queen of Soul: The Atlantic Recordings	Thulani Davis, Tom Dowd, Ahmet Ertegun, Arif Mardin, Dave Marsh, David Ritz and Jerry Wexler	Aretha Franklin
1993	The Complete Capitol Recordings of the Nat King Cole Trio	Will Friedwald and Dick Katz	Nat King Cole Trio
1993	Elvis: The King of Rock 'n' Roll — The Complete 50s Masters	Peter Guralnick	Elvis Presley
1993	Roots 'N Blues: The Retrospective (1925–1950)	Lawrence Cohn and Pete Welding	Various Artists
1993	You're the Top: Cole Porter in the 1930s	Robert Kimball and Richard M. Sudhalter	Various Artists
1994
1994	The Complete Billie Holiday on Verve 1945-1959	Buck Clayton, Phil Schaap and Joel E. Siegel	Billie Holiday
1994	King of the Blues	Colin Escott	B. B. King
1994	The Complete Riverside Recordings	Jim Ferguson and Orrin Keepnews	Wes Montgomery
1994	Elvis: From Nashville to Memphis — The Essential 60s Masters	Peter Guralnick	Elvis Presley
1994	Sounds of the South: A Musical Journey from the Georgia Sea Islands to the Mississippi Delta Recorded in the Field by Alan Lomax	Alan Lomax and Robert Palmer	Various Artists
1995
1995	Louis Armstrong: Portrait of the Artist as a Young Man, 1923–1934	Dan Morgenstern and Loren Schoenberg	Louis Armstrong
1995	Beauty Is a Rare Thing: The Complete Atlantic Recordings	Yves Beauvais, Don Cherry, Ornette Coleman and Robert Palmer	Ornette Coleman
1995	The Complete Bud Powell on Verve	Celia Powell, Peter Pullman, Sonny Rollins and Horace Silver	Bud Powell
1995	Otis! The Definitive	Carol Cooper, Steve Greenberg and Jaime Wolf	Otis Redding
1995	Sam Cooke's SAR Records Story 1959-1965	Peter Guralnick	Sam Cooke
1996
1996	The Complete Stax/Volt Soul Singles, Vol. 3: 1972–1975	Rob Bowman	Various Artists
1996	25th Anniversary: Retrospective	John Fricke	Judy Garland
1996	Ella: The Legendary Decca Recordings	Geoffrey Mark Fidelman and James Gavin	Ella Fitzgerald
1996	I'll Be Seeing You: A Tribute to Carmen McRae	Dan Morgenstern	Carmen McRae
1996	Let's Do It: Best of the Verve Years	Dan Morgenstern	Louis Armstrong
1997
1997	The Complete Columbia Studio Recordings	George Avakian, Bob Belden, Bill Kirchner and Phil Schaap	Miles Davis and Gil Evans
1997	The Complete Capitol Singles Collection	Will Friedwald	Frank Sinatra
1997	The Complete Recordings, Vol. 5: The Final Chapter	Chris Albertson	Bessie Smith
1997	Mean Old World: The Blues from 1940 to 1994	Lawrence Hoffman	Various Artists
1997	The Mel Tormé Collection: 1944-1985	Will Friedwald, Dave Kapp and Mel Tormé	Mel Tormé
1998
1998	Anthology of American Folk Music: 1997 Expanded Edition	John Fahey, Luis Kemnitzer, Jon Pankake, Chuck Pirtle, Jeff Place, Neil V. Rosenberg, Lucy Sante, Peter Stampfel and Eric Von Schmidt	Various Artists
1998	Anthology	Robert Gordon	Al Green
1998	Farewells & Fantasies	Ben Edmonds, Mark Kemp, Meegan Lee Ochs and Michael Ventura	Phil Ochs
1998	Genius & Soul: The 50th Anniversary Collection	Dave Alvin, James Austin, Bill Dahl, Ahmet Ertegun, David Ritz, Billy Vera and Jerry Wexler	Ray Charles
1998	Titanic: Music As Heard on the Fateful Voyage	Ian Whitcomb	Various Artists
1999
1999	Miles Davis Quintet 1965-1968	Bob Belden, Todd Coolman and Michael Cuscuna	Miles Davis Quintet
1999	Charles Mingus: Passions of a Man — The Complete Atlantic Recordings 1956-1961	Joel Dorn, Tom Dowd, Andrew Homzy, Patrick Milligan, Sue Mingus, Tina Marisa Rocchio and Stefano Zenni	Charles Mingus
1999	The Complete Hank Williams	Daniel Cooper and Colin Escott	Hank Williams
1999	From Where I Stand: The Black Experience in Country Music	Bill Ivey, Bill C. Malone, Claudia Perry, John W. Rumble and Ron Wynn	Various Artists
1999	New York Philharmonic: The Historic Broadcasts 1923 to 1987	Sedgwick Clark, Barbara Haws, Kurt Masur, Alan Rich, Robert Sherman and Steven Smolian	New York Philharmonic

=== 2000s ===
Year^{[I]}	Work	Recipient(s)	Performing artist(s)
2000
2000	John Coltrane: The Classic Quartet — The Complete Impulse! Recordings	Bob Blumenthal	John Coltrane
2000	Hank Williams: Live at the Grand Ole Opry	Rick Bragg	Hank Williams
2000	The Last Soul Company	Rob Bowman	Various Artists
2000	Ray Charles: The Complete Country & Western Recordings (1959-1986)	Daniel Cooper	Ray Charles
2000	Sony Music 100 Years: Soundtrack for a Century	Marc Kirkeby	Various Artists
2001
2001	Miles Davis & John Coltrane: The Complete Columbia Recordings 1955-1961	Bob Blumenthal	Miles Davis and John Coltrane
2001	The Best of Broadside 1962–1988: Anthems of the American Underground from the Pages of Broadside Magazine	Jeff Place	Various Artists
2001	The Complete Lester Young Studio Sessions on Verve	John Chilton	Lester Young
2001	Hotcakes & Outtakes: 30 Years of Little Feat	Bud Scoppa	Little Feat
2001	The Remains of Tom Lehrer	Dr. Demento	Tom Lehrer
2001	Yes I Can! The Sammy Davis Jr. Story	Gerald Early	Sammy Davis Jr.
2002
2002	...And It's Deep Too! The Complete Warner Bros. Recordings (1968–1992) (TIE)	Walter Mosley	Richard Pryor
2002	Arhoolie Records 40th Anniversary Collection: 1960–2000 The Journey of Chris Strachwitz (TIE)	Elijah Wald	Various Artists
2002	The Long Road to Freedom: An Anthology of Black Music	Mari Evans	Various Artists
2002	Rhapsodies in Black: Music and Words from the Harlem Renaissance	Gerald Early	Various Artists
2002	The Stax Story	Rob Bowman	Various Artists
2003
2003	Screamin' and Hollerin' the Blues: The Worlds of Charley Patton	David H. Evans Jr.	Charlie Patton
2003	Artie Shaw: Self Portrait	Artie Shaw	Artie Shaw
2003	The Golden Road (1965-1973)	Dennis McNally	Grateful Dead
2003	Sinatra in Hollywood (1940-1964)	Will Friedwald	Frank Sinatra
2003	A State of Wonder: The Complete Goldberg Variations 1955 & 1981	Tim Page	Glenn Gould
2004
2004	Martin Scorsese Presents the Blues: A Musical Journey	Tom Piazza	Various Artists
2004	Count Basie and His Orchestra: America's #1 Band! The Columbia Years	Loren Schoenberg	Count Basie and His Orchestra
2004	Four Women: The Nina Simone Philips Recordings	Ashley Kahn	Nina Simone
2004	Peggy Lee: The Singles Collection	Will Friedwald	Peggy Lee
2004	Sam Cooke with the Soul Stirrers: The Complete Specialty Records Recordings	Daniel Wolff	Sam Cooke with The Soul Stirrers
2005
2005	The Complete Columbia Recordings of Woody Herman and His Orchestra & Woodchoppers (1945-1947)	Loren Schoenberg	Woody Herman and His Orchestra
2005	The Bootleg Series Vol. 6: Bob Dylan Live 1964, Concert at Philharmonic Hall	Sean Wilentz	Bob Dylan
2005	Carry It On	Barry Alfonso	Peter, Paul and Mary
2005	Let the Buyer Beware	Paul Krassner	Lenny Bruce
2005	No Thanks! The '70s Punk Rebellion	Chris Morris	Various Artists
2006
2006	The Complete Library of Congress Recordings by Alan Lomax	John Szwed	Jelly Roll Morton
2006	Heaven Must Have Sent You: The Holland/Dozier/Holland Story	Adam White	Various Artists
2006	The Legend	Patrick Carr	Johnny Cash
2006	Pure Genius: The Complete Atlantic Recordings (1952-1959)	David Ritz	Ray Charles
2006	You Ain't Talkin' to Me: Charlie Poole and the Roots of Country Music	Henry Sapoznik	Charlie Poole and Various Artists
2007
2007	If You Got to Ask, You Ain't Got It!	Dan Morgenstern	Fats Waller
2007	Good for What Ails You: Music of the Medicine Shows, 1926-1937	Marshall Wyatt	Various Artists
2007	Lost Sounds: Blacks and the Birth of the Recording Industry 1891-1922	Tim Brooks	Various Artists
2007	Pirate Radio	Ben Edmonds	The Pretenders
2007	There Is a Season	David Fricke	The Byrds
2008
2008	John Work, III: Recording Black Culture	Bruce Nemerov	Various Artists
2008	Actionable Offenses: Indecent Phonograph Recordings from the 1890s	Patrick Feaster and David Giovannoni	Various Artists
2008	Classic Chu Berry Columbia and Victor Sessions	Loren Schoenberg	Chu Berry
2008	Off the Record: The Complete 1923 Jazz Band Recordings	David Sager	King Oliver's Creole Jazz Band
2008	Ricky Jay Plays Poker	Ricky Jay	Various Artists
2009
2009	Kind of Blue: 50th Anniversary Collector's Edition	Francis Davis	Miles Davis
2009	Art of Field Recording Volume I: Fifty Years of Traditional American Music Documented by Art Rosenbaum	Art Rosenbaum	Various Artists
2009	Debate '08: Taft and Bryan Campaign on the Edison Phonograph	Patrick Feaster and David Giovannoni	William Jennings Bryan and William Howard Taft
2009	Rare & Unreleased Recordings from the Golden Reign of the Queen of Soul	David Ritz and Jerry Wexler	Aretha Franklin
2009	The Unsung Father of Country Music: 1925-1934	Henry Sapoznik	Ernest V. Stoneman

=== 2010s ===
Year^{[I]}	Work	Recipient(s)	Performing artist(s)
2010
2010	The Complete Louis Armstrong Decca Sessions (1935-1946)	Dan Morgenstern	Louis Armstrong
2010	Dance-O-Mania: Harry Yerkes and the Dawn of the Jazz Age, 1919-1923	Mark Berresford	The Happy Six
2010	Gonzo: The Life and Work of Dr. Hunter S. Thompson — Music from the Film	Douglas Brinkley and Johnny Depp	Various Artists
2010	My Dusty Road	Ed Cray and Bill Nowlin	Woody Guthrie
2010	Origins of the Red Hot Mama, 1910-1922	Lloyd Ecker and Susan Ecker	Sophie Tucker
2011
2011	Keep an Eye on the Sky	Robert Gordon	Big Star
2011	Alan Lomax in Haiti: Recordings for the Library of Congress, 1936-1937	Gage Averill	Various Artists
2011	Side Steps	Ashley Kahn	John Coltrane
2011	There Breathes a Hope: The Legacy of John Work II and His Fisk Jubilee Quartet, 1909-1916	Doug Seroff	Fisk University Jubilee Quartet
2011	True Love Cast Out All Evil	Will Sheff	Roky Erickson with Okkervil River
2012
2012	Hear Me Howling!: Blues, Ballads & Beyond as Recorded by the San Francisco Bay by Chris Strachwitz in the 1960s	Adam Machado	Various Artists
2012	The Bang Years 1966–1968	Neil Diamond	Neil Diamond
2012	The Bristol Sessions, 1927–1928: The Big Bang of Country Music	Ted Olson and Tony Russell	Various Artists
2012	The Music City Story: Street Corner Doo Wop, Raw R&B and Soulful Sounds from Berkeley, California 1950–75	Alec Palao	Various Artists
2012	Syl Johnson: Complete Mythology	Ken Shipley	Syl Johnson
2013
2013	Singular Genius: The Complete ABC Singles	Billy Vera	Ray Charles
2013	Banjo Diary: Lessons from Tradition	Stephen Wade	Stephen Wade
2013	First Recordings: 50th Anniversary Edition	Hans Olof Gottfridsson	The Beatles with Tony Sheridan
2013	The Pearl Sessions	Holly George-Warren	Janis Joplin
2013	Piazzolla in Brooklyn	Fernando Gonzalez	Pablo Aslan Quintet
2014
2014	Afro Blue Impressions (Remastered & Expanded)	Neil Tesser	John Coltrane
2014	360 Sound: The Columbia Records Story	Sean Wilentz	Various Artists
2014	Call It Art 1964–1965	Ben Young	New York Art Quartet
2014	Electric Music for the Mind and Body	Alec Palao	Country Joe and the Fish
2014	Stravinsky: Le Sacre du Printemps	Jonathan Cott	Leonard Bernstein and New York Philharmonic
2014	Work Hard, Play Hard, Pray Hard: Hard Time, Good Time & End Time Music 1923–1936	Nathan Salsburg	Various Artists
2015
2015	Offering: Live at Temple University	Ashley Kahn	John Coltrane
2015	Happy: The 1920 Rainbo Orchestra Sides	David Sager	Isham Jones Rainbo Orchestra
2015	I'm Just Like You: Sly's Stone Flower 1969–70	Alec Palao	Various Artists
2015	The Other Side of Bakersfield: 1950s & 60s Boppers and Rockers from 'Nashville West', Vol. 1	Scott B. Bomar	Various Artists
2015	Purple Snow: Forecasting the Minneapolis Sound	Jon Kirby	Various Artists
2015	The Rise & Fall of Paramount Records, Volume One (1917–27)	Scott Blackwood	Various Artists
2016
2016	Love Has Many Faces: A Quartet, a Ballet, Waiting to Be Danced	Joni Mitchell	Joni Mitchell
2016	Folksongs of Another America: Field Recordings from the Upper Midwest, 1937–1946	James P. Leary	Various Artists
2016	Lead Belly: The Smithsonian Folkways Collection	Jeff Place	Lead Belly
2016	Portrait of an American Singer	Ted Olson	Tennessee Ernie Ford
2016	Songs of the Night: Dance Recordings, 1916–1925	Ryan Barna	Joseph C. Smith's Orchestra
2017
2017	Sissle and Blake Sing Shuffle Along	Ken Bloom and Richard Carlin	Eubie Blake and Noble Sissle
2017	The Complete Monument & Columbia Album Collection	Mikal Gilmore	Kris Kristofferson
2017	The Knoxville Sessions, 1929–1930: Knox County Stomp	Ted Olson and Tony Russell	Various Artists
2017	Ork Records: New York, New York	Rob Sevier and Ken Shipley	Various Artists
2017	Waxing the Gospel: Mass Evangelism and the Phonograph, 1890–1900	Richard Martin	Various Artists
2018
2018	Live at the Whisky a Go Go: The Complete Recordings	Lynell George	Otis Redding
2018	Arthur Q. Smith: The Trouble with the Truth	Wayne Bledsoe and Bradley Reeves	Various Artists
2018	Big Bend Killing: The Appalachian Ballad Tradition	Ted Olson	Various Artists
2018	The Complete Piano Works of Scott Joplin	Bryan S. Wright	Richard Dowling
2018	Edouard-Léon Scott de Martinville, Inventor of Sound Recording: A Bicentennial Tribute	David Giovannoni	Various Artists
2018	Washington Phillips and His Manzarene Dreams	Michael Corcoran	Washington Phillips
2019
2019	Voices of Mississippi: Artists and Musicians Documented by William Ferris	David Evans	Various Artists
2019	4 Banjo Songs, 1891–1897: Foundational Recordings of America's Iconic Instrument	Richard Martin and Ted Olson	Charles A. Asbury
2019	The 1960 Time Sessions	Ben Ratliff	Sonny Clark Trio
2019	Alpine Dreaming: The Helvetia Records Story, 1920–1924	James P. Leary	Various Artists
2019	The Product of Our Souls: The Sound and Sway of James Reese Europe's Society Orchestra	David Gilbert	Various Artists
2019	Trouble No More: The Bootleg Series Vol. 13 / 1979–1981 (Deluxe Edition)	Amanda Petrusich	Bob Dylan

=== 2020s ===
Year^{[I]}	Work	Recipient(s)	Performing artist(s)
2020
2020	Stax '68: A Memphis Story	Steve Greenberg	Various Artists
2020	The Complete Cuba Jam Sessions	Judy Cantor-Navas	Various Artists
2020	The Gospel According to Malaco	Robert Marovich	Various Artists
2020	Pedal Steal + Four Corners	Brendan Greaves	Terry Allen and the Panhandle Mystery Band
2020	Pete Seeger: The Smithsonian Folkways Collection	Jeff Place	Pete Seeger
2021
2021	Dead Man's Pop	Bob Mehr	The Replacements
2021	At the Minstrel Show: Minstrel Routines from the Studio, 1894–1926	Tim Brooks	Various Artists
2021	The Bakersfield Sound: Country Music Capital of the West, 1940–1974	Scott B. Bomar	Various Artists
2021	The Missing Link: How Gus Haenschen Got Us from Joplin to Jazz and Shaped the Music Business	Colin Hancock	Various Artists
2021	Out of a Clear Blue Sky	David Sager	Nat Brusiloff
2022
2022	The Complete Louis Armstrong Columbia and RCA Victor Studio Sessions, 1946–1966	Ricky Riccardi	Louis Armstrong
2022	Beethoven: The Last Three Sonatas	Ann-Katrin Zimmermann	Sunwook Kim
2022	Creation Never Sleeps, Creation Never Dies: The Willie Dunn Anthology	Kevin Howes	Willie Dunn
2022	Etching the Voice: Emile Berliner and the First Commercial Gramophone Discs, 1889–1895	David Giovannoni, Richard Martin and Stephan Puille	Various Artists
2022	The King of Gospel Music: The Life and Music of Reverend James Cleveland	Robert Marovich	Various Artists
2023
2023	Yankee Hotel Foxtrot (20th Anniversary Super Deluxe Edition)	Bob Mehr	Wilco
2023	The American Clavé Recordings	Fernando González	Astor Piazzolla
2023	Andy Irvine & Paul Brady (Special Edition)	Gareth Murphy	Andy Irvine and Paul Brady
2023	Harry Partch, 1942	John Schneider	Harry Partch
2023	Life's Work: A Retrospective	Ted Olson	Doc Watson
2024
2024	Written in Their Soul: The Stax Songwriter Demos	Robert Gordon and Deanie Parker	Various Artists
2024	Evenings at the Village Gate: John Coltrane with Eric Dolphy (Live)	Ashley Kahn	John Coltrane and Eric Dolphy
2024	I Can Almost See Houston: The Complete Howdy Glenn	Scott B. Bomar	Howdy Glenn
2024	Mogadishu's Finest: The Al Uruba Sessions	Vik Sohonie	Iftin Band
2024	Playing for the Man at the Door: Field Recordings from the Collection of Mack McCormick, 1958–1971	Jeff Place and John Troutman	Various Artists
2025
2025	Centennial	Ricky Riccardi	King Oliver's Creole Jazz Band and Various Artists
2025	After Midnight	Tim Brooks	Ford Dabney's Syncopated Orchestras
2025	The Carnegie Hall Concert	Lauren Du Graf	Alice Coltrane
2025	John Culshaw: The Art of the Producer – The Early Years 1948–55	Dominic Fyfe	John Culshaw
2025	SONtrack Original de la Pelicula "Al Son de Beno"	Josh Kun	Various Artists
2026
2026	Miles '55: The Prestige Recordings	Ashley Kahn	Miles Davis
2026	Adios, Farewell, Goodbye, Good Luck, So Long: On Stage 1964–1974	Scott B. Bomar	Buck Owens and His Buckaroos
2026	After the Last Sky	Adam Shatz	Anouar Brahem, Anja Lechner, Django Bates and Dave Holland
2026	Árabe	Amanda Ekery	Amanda Ekery
2026	The First Family: Live at Winchester Cathedral 1967	Alec Palao	Sly and the Family Stone
2026	A Ghost Is Born (20th Anniversary Deluxe Edition)	Bob Mehr	Wilco
2027
2027	Clifton Chenier: King of Louisiana Blues & Zydeco	Adam Machado	Clifton Chenier
2027	Guglielmi: Amalia e Carlo (Live)	Mitchell Hutchins	Floriday Atlantic University Opera Theatre
2027	Haydn: The Complete Decca Recordings	Dominic Fyfe	Antal Doráti
2027	Mother of the Blues: The Complete Paramount Recordings 1923-1928	David Sager	Ma Rainey
2027	Pisces, Aquarius, Capricorn & Jones Ltd. (Super Deluxe Edition)	Andrew Sandoval	The Monkees
