= I Was the One (album) =

Remix album by Elvis Presley
- Released: May 1983
- Recorded: 1956 – 1983
- Genres: Rockabilly; rock-and-roll
- Length: 24:33
- Label: RCA Victor
- Producers: David Briggs; Tony Brown

Elvis Presley chronology
The Elvis Medley (1982)	I Was the One (1983)	Elvis: A Legendary Performer Volume 4 (1983)

Singles from I Was the One
- 1. "I Was the One" Released: 1983

I Was the One is a compilation album of songs by American rock and roll singer Elvis Presley, released by RCA Records in May 1983. It collects eleven of Presley's rockabilly tracks from early in his career, recorded between 1956 and 1961, focusing on album tracks and B-sides rather than more popular hit singles.

The album was helmed by keyboardist David Briggs, who co-produced it with RCA's A&R director Tony Brown. Briggs, who believed much of Presley's output was obscure and still held commercial potential, conceived I Was the One in response to the rockabilly revival spearheaded by groups like the Stray Cats, and aimed to demonstrate Presley as a pioneer of the style. Wishing to create a stereo record but aware that the original recordings were in mono, making it impossible to separate the vocal and instrumental tracks, Briggs and Brown instead hired the original musicians and backing singers to re-record their parts, overdubbing these in stereo sound over Presley's vocal tracks. The resulting remixes have been noted for their contemporary sound, and also for their faithfulness, with the musicians replicating their performances with precision, even down to reproducing mistakes.

Released in May 1983, I Was the One reached number 186 on the Billboard 200 on number 83 on the UK Albums Chart. RCA promoted the album with a press party and dance competition at New York City's Peppermint Lounge, and released the title track as a single. Contemporary music critics highlighted the album for the uniqueness of the remixes, the unusual song selection and the vibrancy of Presley's performances. Retrospective reviews have criticized the overdubs as unnecessary additions to create a contemporary sound.

== Background ==
I Was the One was conceived by record producer and keyboardist, David Briggs, who believed that a large portion of Elvis Presley's music was obscure and could become commercially successful if re-released. It was the second Presley project helmed by Briggs, following the compilation The Elvis Medley (1982), which had sold 150,000 copies. Its eponymous megamix, produced by Briggs and using computerized drums and some new instruments, was issued as a single and entered several record charts.

Using a title given to him by South Bend Tribune journalist Jim Wensits in 1982, Briggs initially planned I Was the One to comprise mostly early ballad material, containing the eponymous song as well as "Don't", "Anyplace Is Paradise" and "Love Me". Instead, Briggs and co-producer Tony Brown – who was also A&R director at RCA Records – settled on compiling a collection of Presley's rockabilly recordings. The genre was experiencing renewed popularity at the time through revivalist groups such as the Stray Cats, making the compilation timely. As Briggs explained, "[the] rockabilly thing is so hot, we thought it was the direction to go at this time. This album shows that he [Presley] was doing what everyone is copying now."

== Production ==
=== Compiling and sequencing ===
Produced by Briggs and Brown, I Was the One contains eleven of Presley's previously-released rockabilly tracks, dating from 1956 to 1961, and aims to present the singer as a rockabilly phenomenon. The compilation avoids any of his more ubiquitous hits, instead containing relatively obscure album tracks and B-sides that did not receive wide attention on their original release. The earliest recordings date from Presley's work for Sun Records. The latest, "Little Sister", is the only track from the 1960s, having originally been issued as the B-side to "(Marie's the Name) His Latest Flame" in 1961. Described by one reviewer as varied in style, the album showcases not only rockabilly ("Baby Let's Play House") but dramatic crooning (the title track), intense rock and roll ("Rip It Up"), rock/R&B ("My Baby Left Me"), balladry ("Don't") and kitsch ("Wear My Ring Around Your Neck").

The joyous pop number "Wear My Ring Around Your Neck" sits in contrast to the rawer, guitar-laden intro of "Little Sister", a performance which reviewer Jim Kelton believes exudes the same "ease and originality" as Presley's earlier material, despite being recorded later. "Paralyzed" was previously unknown to many buyers and is sung in the smooth "easy-rocking" style later adopted by Pat Boone. The song had been a number-one hit in Europe but was only ever an album cut – from Elvis (1956) – in the United States, never being issued there on a single. Two other songs from Elvis selected for inclusion were the percussive numbers "Ready Teddy" and "Rip It Up", whereas "Baby Let's Play House" was originally issued as a Sun single in 1955 and its ownership switched to RCA after they bought Presley's Sun catalogue. RCA used it as an album track in the late 1950s and issued it as a single in 1964. "My Baby Left Me" is described by Wensits as "an excellent song" that was left in obscurity, largely because it was the B-side to the early hit "I Want You, I Need You, I Love You" (1956).

=== Overdubbing and remixing ===
I Was the One was intended to be a stereo compilation, but because the original recordings were taped in mono, Briggs and Brown could not separate the vocal and instrumental tracks, as producer Felton Jarvis was able to when preparing an earlier Presley compilation, Guitar Man, in 1981. Instead, they elected to add newly-recorded stereo overdubs onto the material, hiring the same musicians as on the original versions, such as guitarist Scotty Moore, drummer D.J. Fontana, and backing singers the Jordanaires, as well as Briggs himself, who was a keyboardist on numerous Presley records. In this way, the tracks on the album are beefed-up remixes, adding new stereo backing tracks onto the original works.

Although the specific re-recorded instrumental and backing vocal parts were to compensate for the 1950s production values of the original recordings, the performers meticulously transcribed the original performances down to the mistakes, aiming to make their work feel unnoticeable, such that the technical effort has been described as obscured. According to the writer Steve Simels, the musicians "copied their old performances exactly, even down to the mistakes." Cash Box wrote that the new alterations were intended to apply a 1980s rockabilly sound to the material, adding that the original vocal tracks are "sweetened" with new musical accompaniments. Briggs believed the new overdubs gave the album "an enhanced, bigger sound than was on the original records."

I Was the One was not the first posthumous compilation of Presley's music released by RCA to contain new remixes or overdubs. Compilations produced by Jarvis such as Our Memories of Elvis (1979), as well as its sequel from the same year, were remixed to remove the contributions of certain musicians, thus more strongly highlighting Presley's voice, and 1981's Guitar Man continued Jarvis' remix work.

== Release and promotion ==
Intended to emphasise Presley's role as a rockabilly innovator, I Was the One's album cover is a glitzy, 1950s-style artists' impression of Presley in full rockabilly attire, posturing absurdly on his tiptoes and singing into a free-standing microphone. The music critic Christopher Hill comments that the cover art, with its "cartoon-like style and lurid colors", "speaks of an energy and dedication missing from previous packagings of Elvis material." The disc labels are pink, which Kelton interprets as further signs that the album aims to impress and convert fans of the Stray Cats, though he notes the packaging is scant on information, besides listing the song titles, composers and imprecise identification of the backing musicians.

As MusicRow reported in April 1983, the staff at RCA were excited about the release of I Was the One, advertising that it would boast a "bigger" sound around the original vocal tracks of Presley's songs. Also in April, to celebrate the album's release, RCA held a press party and dance contest at the Peppermint Lounge club in New York City, where 1950s-style music was played and the participating rockabilly dancer deemed the best was presented with a leather jacket bearing the name of the album and "Elvis". The ceremony was attended by Brown and Briggs as well as D.J Fontana. The competition was won by Dagoberto Nieves. In May, a larger party event was scheduled for a Memphis venue called the 'Heartbreak Hotel'. Music writers noted that the release was aptly-timed as bands such as the Stray Cats were reviving the rockabilly sound of the mid-1950s. "With all the current interest in rockabilly", wrote Kelton, "a compatible set of Elvis oldies can hardly fail to attract attention."

Released by RCA in May 1983, I Was the One reached number 183 on the Billboard 200, and number 35 on Billboard's Top Country Albums chart. It spent one week on the UK Albums Chart in August 1983, reaching number 83. The title track was released as a single, backed with "Wear My Ring Around Your Neck" as the B-side; in their review, MusicRow's Robert K. Oermann believed the new overdubs made the new Presley project comparable to similar Jim Reeves releases and added, "If I were Dolly or John Denver, I'd be getting nervous." In terms of airplay, "I Was the One" was not well-received by country music stations, but the more upbeat "Wear My Ring Around Your Neck" was popular on pop stations.

== Critical reception ==
=== Contemporary reviews ===
Contemporaneous professional reviews
Review scores
Source	Rating
Green Bay Press-Gazette	3.5/5 stars

In a contemporary review of I Was the One, Jim Kelton of The Daily Herald praised the material for covering Presley's peak, after leaving Sun Records for the bigger RCA but before formulaic songs and poor films marred his trajectory, instead profiling him as "the rockabilly bopster: over-dressed, undomesticated and unsullied by good taste." Despite deeming it a blatant cash-in on the then-current rockabilly revival, Kelton believed the record "far outclasses all that action by virtue of its unself-conscious energy alone." Warren Gerds of the Green Bay Press-Gazette believed the album succeeds in showcasing Presley's authenticity, vibrancy and stylistic scope, and that by focusing on his young and adventurous years, listeners would ignore the singer's later excesses and posthumous scandals, though Gerds did feel the fidelity was poor by modern standards, with a "background rasp" behind most tracks.

The album's newly re-recorded instrumental parts and backing vocals were the main focus for reviewers and consumers. Recommending it as a "Feature Pick", Cash Box described it as "the latest in the never-ending series of Presley reissues" but noted its uniqueness for portraying the singer as "the original stray cat, with the disc-makers altering the sound of the original tunes to give them a 1980s rockabilly flair." They believed contemporary country and western stations would appreciate the album, especially the bass-heavy opening song "My Baby Left Me". Christopher Hill of Record believed that I Was the One was the first serious example of RCA considering how to edit and present Presley's music "in a thoughtful, conscientious manner", resulting in a "tour de force display of Elvis' mastery" that hints at the potential for similar projects. Hill noted that the re-recorded parts were "all but undistinguishable" from the originals, instead believing the compilation stands out through Briggs' compiling and sequencing of the songs, avoiding including "obvious, stereotypical hits" so that the result "is a feeling of new-release freshness".

Naming it the month's "Recording of Special Merit", Stereo Review reviewer Steve Simels deemed I Was the One the first intelligent repackaging of Presley's music conceived by RCA, believing it "will show all the Stray Cats fans out there where the boys cribbed their style from." Contrasting the "neatly sequenced" album with many earlier Presley reissues, which he feels were marred by fake stereo reprocessing, Simels praised how the compilation presents many of Presley's finest rockabilly tracks sympathetically via remixes with newly-recorded stereo instrumentals, concluding that the album debunks the popular notion that Presley was an idiot savant by displaying his talents, and is "timeless rock-and-roll". Less receptive to the release was Joe Bolton of The Commercial Appeal, who noted the inclusion of some classic songs but believed the compilation was as superfluous as other posthumous reissues of Presley's work, opining that the songs "don't seem to have anything in common" besides their age and lamenting the lack of liner notes to "tie everything together; no hint at all as to why this album should exist."

=== Retrospective appraisal and legacy ===
Retrospective professional ratings
Review scores
Source	Rating
AllMusic	2/5 stars
The Encyclopedia of Popular Music	4/5 stars
The Rolling Stone Album Guide	1/5 stars

In The Rolling Stone Album Guide (1983), Dave Marsh criticized I Was the One for 'updating' Presley classics with "new backing tracks, a genuine abomination". He believes that the compilation, along with Elvis Presley's Greatest Hits, Volume 1 (1981), were the result of RCA returning "to its old tricks" of earlier remix efforts like Our Memories of Elvis and Guitar Man. In their book The Worst Rock 'n' Roll Records of All Time (1991), Jimmy Gutermann and Owen O'Donnell name it one of the worst posthumous Presley albums, describing it as "[some] of the greatest rockabilly of all time, defaced by posthumous overdubs to make it sound more 'contemporary.' Stupid."

William Ruhlmann of AllMusic believes the new overdubs made I Was the One sound strangely contemporary, with its true stereo and booming bass sound, highlighting it as the first Presley album "to credit a computer technician" and concluding that the record "is the aural equivalent of a colorized movie" because "it sounds sharp, but phony." Presley biographer Spencer Leigh describes I Was the One as the follow-up to Guitar Man and believes the new backings were unnecessary, commenting that the "wonderful guitars" on "Little Sister" could not be improved upon. The author Christopher McKitterick notes that, as a compilation that leans heavily on Presley's early rockabilly sides, I Was the One exemplified the mounting influence of the Stray Cats, as one of several rockabilly compilations that "flooded the market" following the success of the Stray Cats' album Built for Speed (1982).

== Track listing ==
=== Side one ===
1. "My Baby Left Me" (Arthur Crudup) – 2:12
2. "(You're So Square) Baby I Don't Care" (Jerry Lieber, Mike Stoller) – 1:53
3. "Little Sister" (Doc Pomus, Mort Shuman) – 2:30
4. "Don't" (Leiber, Stoller) – 2:46
5. "Wear My Ring Around Your Neck" (Bert Carroll, Russell Moody) – 2:14
6. "Paralyzed" (Elvis Presley, Otis Blackwell) – 2:22

=== Side two ===
1. "Baby Let's Play House" (Arthur Gunter) – 2:15
2. "I Was the One" (Aaron Schroeder, Bill Peppers, Claude Demetrius, Hal Blair) – 2:31
3. "Rip It Up" (John Marascalco, Robert Blackwell) – 1:50
4. "Young and Beautiful (Schroeder, Abner Silver) – 2:06
5. "Ready Teddy" (Marascalo, Blackwell) – 1:54

== Personnel ==
Adapted from the liner notes of I Was the One

- The Anita Kerr Singers – vocals
- Chet Atkins – rhythm guitar
- Bill Black – bass
- David Briggs – reissue producer
- Dudley Brooks – keyboards
- Tony Brown – reissue producer
- Floyd Cramer – keyboards
- Gene Eichelberger – remix engineer
- Hogan Entertainment – art direction
- D.J. Fontana – drums
- Hank Garland – guitar
- Marvin Hughes – keyboards
- The Jordanaires – vocals
- Millie Kirkham – vocals
- Sheila Landers – assistant engineer
- Shorty Long – keyboards
- Grady Martin – guitar
- Neal Matthews – guitar
- Rick McCollister – computer technician
- Bob Moore – bass
- Scotty Moore – lead guitar
- Elvis Presley – guitar
- Denny Purcell – mastering
- Boots Randolph – claves
- Bill Reiser – illustration
- Ben Speer – vocals
- Brock Speer – vocals
- Gordon Stoker – keyboards
- Tiny Timbrell – guitar

== See also ==
- Christmas Duets
- Viva Elvis (soundtrack)
- If I Can Dream (album)
- The Wonder of You (Elvis Presley album)
- Christmas with Elvis and the Royal Philharmonic Orchestra
- Where No One Stands Alone (album)
- Elvis (soundtrack)
