= Lawrence Gushee =

American musicologist (1931–2015)

- Born: February 25, 1931; Ridley Park, Pennsylvania
- Died: January 6, 2015 (aged 83); Urbana, Illinois

Lawrence Arthur "Larry" Gushee (February 25, 1931 – January 6, 2015) was an American musicologist, who specialized in medieval music and early jazz.

He was born in Ridley Park, Philadelphia, Pennsylvania. He studied at Haverford College, Yale University, University of Dijon, and the Manhattan School of Music. He earned his doctorate at Yale in 1959, with the dissertation "The Musica Disciplina of Aurelian of Réôme: a critical edition and commentary." He taught at the University of Wisconsin in Madison, Yale, and the University of Illinois at Urbana-Champaign, where he was Professor Emeritus.

Gushee was twice a Guggenheim Fellow, once in Europe to study sources of medieval music (particularly 14th century French music), and once relating to research into early jazz. In his jazz research he studied the role of the Freddie Keppard's band's tours of the vaudeville circuit in the diffusion of jazz between 1914 and 1918, before he settled in Chicago.

Gushee also played traditional jazz and ragtime, performing as a clarinetist in the New Golden Rule Orchestra.

Gushee worked closely with Vernacular Music Research musicologist Thornton Hagert. He died at a nursing home in Urbana, Illinois, on January 6, 2015.

== Books ==
- Pioneers of Jazz: The Story of the Creole Band, Oxford University Press 2005, ISBN 0-19-516131-9
