= Jeff Place =

American archivist of sound recordings (born 1956)

Jeff Place (born 1956) is an American writer and producer, and a curator and senior archivist with the Smithsonian Center for Folklife and Cultural Heritage. He has won three Grammy Awards and six Indie Awards.

== Early life ==
Place learned his appreciation for folk music from his parents who took him to Bob Dylan and Peter, Paul and Mary concerts when he was a child. He attended Kenyon College, graduating in 1979. After college, Place worked in a record store in Washington, D.C. and started writing reviews for the store's magazine, REVUE.

He then enrolled in the University of Maryland, receiving a Master of Library Science with a specialization in sound archives.

== Career ==
After graduate school, Place started working at the Smithsonian Institution. In 1988, Place and Anthony "Tony" Seeger were the first two full-time employees at the Center for Folklife and Cultural Heritage when the Smithsonian acquired Folkways Records from the estate of Moses Asch. In 1989, he started writing liner notes for the Folkways albums. He has also written companion books for special releases and box sets.

Place has been involved in the compilation of more than sixty albums of American music for Smithsonian Folkways. He won three Grammy Awards, two (Best Album Notes and Best Historical Album) in 1997 for Anthology of American Folk Music - 1997 Expanded Edition, and one (Producer) for Pete Seeger: The Smithsonian Collection in 2019. He received Grammy-nominations for five other productions (ten nominations total). He also received six Indie Awards.

Place has helped curate several exhibitions, including This Land is Your Land, which is about Woody Guthrie.

== Awards and honors ==
- National Association of Independent Record Distributors Indie Award, Honorable Mention, Historical Release, 1989 – Folkways: The Original Vision, Smithsonian/Folkways
- National Association of Independent Record Distributors Indie Award, Honorable Mention, Historical release, 1990 – The Doc Watson Family, Smithsonian/Folkways
- American Folklore Society McCallum Prize, 1994 – for his preservation work leading to Long Ways to Travel (The Unreleased Woody Guthrie Sessions)
- Grammy Awards, Best Historical Album, 1998 – Anthology of American Folk Music
- Grammy Awards, Best Album Notes, 1998 – Anthology of American Folk Music
- National Association of Independent Record Distributors Indie Award, Best Liner Notes, 1998 – The Anthology of American Folk Music
- National Association of Independent Record Distributors Indie Award, Best Historical Release, 1998 – The Anthology of American Folk Music
- National Association of Independent Record Distributors Indie Award, Best Americana Release 1999 – The Harry Smith Connection: A Live Tribute to the Anthology of American Folk Music
- National Association of Independent Record Distributors Indie Award, Best Historical Release, 2000 – The Asch Recordings
- Grammy Awards Best Album Notes (nominee), 2001 – The Best of Broadside
- Grammy Awards, Best Historical Album (nominee), 2001 – The Best of Broadside
- National Association of Independent Record Distributors Indie Award, Best Packaging, 2001.– The Best of Broadside
- National Association of Independent Record Distributors Indie Award, Best liner Notes, 2001 – The Best of Broadside
- Independent Music Awards, Best Album Compilation, 2010 – Classic Appalachian Blues from Smithsonian Folkways
- Independent Music Awards, Best Reissue Album, 2011 – Rising Sun Melodies
- Grammy Awards, Best Historical Album (nominee), 2013 – Woody at 100: The Woody Guthrie Centennial Collection
- Grammy Awards, Best Album Notes (nominee), 2016 – Lead Belly: The Smithsonian Folkways Collection
- Independent Music Awards, Best Compilation Album, 2015 – Classic African-American Songsters
- Independent Music Awards, Best Compilation Album, 2018 – Classic English and Scottish Ballads from the Frances James Child Collection
- International Bluegrass Music Awards, Best Liner Notes, 2019 – Epilogue: A Tribute to John Duffey
- Grammy Awards, Best Historical Album, 2020 – Pete Seeger: The Smithsonian Centennial Collection
- Grammy Awards, Best Album Notes (nominee), 2020 – Pete Seeger: The Smithsonian Centennial Collection
- Grammy Awards, Best Historical Album (nominee), 2024 – Playing for the Man at the Door: Field Recordings from the Collection of Mack McCormick, 1958-1971
- Grammy Awards, Best Historical Notes (nominee), 2024 – Playing for the Man at the Door: Field Recordings from the Collection of Mack McCormick, 1958-1971

== Personal life ==
After living in Mayo, Maryland since 1997, Place moved to Kill Devil Hills, North Carolina in 2020.

== Discography ==
- Folkways: The Original Vision. Smithsonian Folkways, 1989 (co-producer)
- Doc Watson. The Doc Watson Family. Smithsonian Folkways, 1990 (co-producer and liner notes)
- Music in the Glen: The 1990 Washington Irish Festival. Washington Irish Festival, 1990 (producer)
- Roots of Rhythm and Blues: A Tribute to the Robert Johnson Era. Columbia, 1992 (production assistant)
- Doc Watson and Clarence Ashley. Original Folkways Recordings of Doc Watson and Clarence Ashley. Smithsonian Folkways, 1994 (co-producer)
- Woody Guthrie. Long Ways to Travel (The Unreleased Woody Guthrie Sessions). Smithsonian Folkways, 1994 (co-producer and liner notes).
- Woody Guthrie, Lead Belly, and The Almanac Singers. That's Why We're Marching: World War II and the American Folk Song Movement. Smithsonian Folkways, 1996 (producer and liner notes)
- Lead Belly. Where Did You Sleep Last Night?: The Lead Belly Legacy Vol. 1. Smithsonian Folkways, 1996 (co-producer and liner notes)
- Woody Guthrie. Ballads of Sacco and Vanzetti. Smithsonian Folkways, 1996 (co-compiler of reissue)
- Woody Guthrie. This Land is Your Land: The Asch Recordings Vol. 1. Smithsonian Folkways, 1997 (co-producer and liner notes)
- Lead Belly. The Bourgeois Blues: The Lead Belly Legacy Vol. 2. Smithsonian/Folkways, 1997 (liner notes and producer)
- Anthology of American Folk Music (expanded edition). Smithsonian Folkways, 1997 (liner notes and co-producer)
- Woody Guthrie. Muleskinner Blues: The Asch Recordings Vol. 2. Smithsonian Folkways, 1997 (co-producer and liner notes)
- Lead Belly. Shout On: The Lead Belly Legacy Vol. 3. Smithsonian Folkways, 1998 (producer and liner notes)
- Josh White. Free and Equal Blues. Smithsonian /Folkways, 1998 (compiler)
- Woody Guthrie. Hard Traveling: The Asch Recordings Vol. 3. Smithsonian Folkways, 1998 (co-producer and liner notes)
- Woody Guthrie. Buffalo Skinners: The Asch Recordings Vol. 4.. Smithsonian Folkways, 1999 (co-producer and liner notes)
- Various Artists.The Harry Smith Connection: A Live Tribute to the Anthology of American Folk Music. Smithsonian Folkways, 1998 (co-producer and liner notes)
- Lead Belly. Lead Belly Sings for Children. Smithsonian Folkways, 1999. (reissue compiler and liner notes)
- Woody Guthrie. The Asch Recordings (4 CD boxed set). Smithsonian Folkways, 1999. (co-producer and liner notes)
- Big Bill Broonzy. Trouble in Mind. Smithsonian Folkways, 2000 (producer and liner notes)
- Various Artists. The Best of Broadside (5-CD box set). Smithsonian Folkways, 2000. (co-producer and co-author of 160-page book)
- Fast Folk: A Community of Singers and Songwriters. Smithsonian Folkways, 2002 (co-producer and liner notes)
- Classic Bluegrass on Smithsonian Folkways. Smithsonian Folkways, 2002 (co-producer and liner notes)
- Pete Seeger. America's Favorite Ballads, vol. 1. Smithsonian Folkways, 2002 (co-producer and liner notes)
- Pete Seeger. America's Favorite Ballads, vol. 2. Smithsonian Folkways, 2003 (co-producer and liner notes)
- Classic Mountain Songs from Smithsonian Folkways. Smithsonian Folkways, 2002 (producer and liner notes)
- Classic Old-Time Music from Smithsonian Folkways. Smithsonian Folkways, 2003 (producer and liner notes)
- Spain in My Heart: Songs of the Spanish Civil War. Appleseed, 2003 (liner notes)
- Classic Maritime Music from Smithsonian Folkways. Smithsonian Folkways, 2004 (producer and liner notes)
- Classic Folk from Smithsonian Folkways. Smithsonian Folkways, 2004 (producer and liner notes)
- Pete Seeger. America's Favorite Ballads, Vol. 3. Smithsonian Folkways, 2004 (co-producer and liner notes)
- Classic Bluegrass from Smithsonian Folkways, Vol. 2. Smithsonian Folkways, 2005 (co-producer and liner notes)
- Folkways: The Original Vision, revised edition. Smithsonian Folkways, 2005 (co-producer and liner notes)
- Classic Railroad Songs from Smithsonian Folkways. Smithsonian Folkways, 2006 (producer and liner notes)
- Classic Labor Songs from Smithsonian Folkways. Smithsonian Folkways, 2006 (co-producer and liner notes)
- Down Home Saturday Night. Smithsonian Folkways, 2006 (co-producer and liner notes)
- Pete Seeger. America's Favorite Ballads, Vol. 4. Smithsonian Folkways, 2006 (co-producer and liner notes)
- Harry Smith Project, Live (boxed set). Shout Factory, 2006 (liner notes)
- Classic Old-Time Fiddle from Smithsonian Folkways. Smithsonian Folkways, 2007 (co-producer and liner notes)
- If You Ain’t Got the Do-Re-Mi: Songs of Rags and Riches. Smithsonian Folkways, 2007 (Co-producer and liner notes)
- Pete Seeger. America's Favorite Ballads, Vol. 5. Smithsonian Folkways, 2007 (co-producer and liner notes)
- Pete Seeger. America's Favorite Ballads (boxed set). Smithsonian Folkways, 2009 (co-producer and liner notes)
- Classic Piano Blues from Smithsonian Folkways. Smithsonian Folkways, 2008 (co-producer and liner notes)
- Classic Protest Songs from Smithsonian Folkways. Smithsonian Folkways 2009 (co-producer and liner notes)
- John Jackson. Rappahannock Blues. Smithsonian Folkways, 2009 (co-producer and liner notes)
- Pete Seeger. Live at Bowdoin College. Smithsonian Folkways, 2012 (producer and liner notes)
- Classic American Ballads from Smithsonian Folkways. Smithsonian Folkways, 2015 (producer and liner notes)
- Classic Appalachian Blues from Smithsonian Folkways. Smithsonian Folkways, 2009 (co-producer and liner notes)
- Ola Belle Reed and family. Rising Sun Melodies. Smithsonian Folkways, 2010 (producer and liner notes)
- Chip Taylor. Golden Kids Rules. Smithsonian Folkways, 2011 (liner notes)
- Classic Harmonica Blues. Smithsonian Folkways, 2012 (co-producer and liner notes)
- Woody Guthrie. Woody at 100: The Woody Guthrie Centennial Collection. Smithsonian Folkways, 2012 (Co-author of companion book and producer)
- Classic African-American Songsters. Smithsonian Folkways, 2014 (co-producer and liner notes)
- Dave Van Ronk. Down in Washington Square: The Smithsonian Folkways Collection. Smithsonian Folkways, 2013 (producer and annotator)
- Classic Banjo from Smithsonian Folkways. Smithsonian Folkways, 2013 (co-producer and liner notes)
- Lead Belly. Lead Belly: The Smithsonian Folkways Collection. Smithsonian Folkways, 2014 (co-producer and author of companion book)
- Classic American Ballads. Smithsonian Folkways, 2015 (producer and liner notes)
- Pete Seeger. Pete Seeger: The Smithsonian Centennial Collection. Smithsonian Folkways, 2019 (co-producer and author of companion book)
- Classic Folk Songs for Children. Smithsonian Folkways, 2015 (producer and liner notes)
- Classic English and Scottish Ballads from the Frances James Child Collection. Smithsonian Folkways, 2017 (producer and liner notes)
- Woody Guthrie. Roll Columbia: Woody Guthrie's 26 Northwest Songs. Smithsonian Folkways, 2017 (liner notes)
- Dan Zanes and friends. Lead Belly, Baby! Smithsonian Folkways, 2017 (liner notes)
- Barbara Dane. Hot Jazz, Cool Blues, and Hard-Hitting Songs. Smithsonian Folkways, 2017 (co-producer and liner notes)
- Epilogue: A Tribute to John Duffey. Smithsonian Folkways, 2018 (liner notes)
- Pete Seeger. Pete Seeger: The Smithsonian Centennial Collection (book and six-CD box set). Smithsonian Folkways, 2019 (co-producer and author)
- Jazz Fest: The New Orleans Jazz and Heritage Festival (5-CD set and book). Smithsonian Folkways, 2019. (co-author and producer)
- The Social Power of Music (4-CD set and book). Smithsonian Folkways, 2019 (co-author and producer)
- A Living Tradition: A Selection from Folk-Legacy Records. Smithsonian Folkways, 2019 (liner notes)
- Take Me Back to the Range: Selections from the Western Jubilee Recording Company. Smithsonian Folkways, 2020 (liner notes)
- The Village Out West: The Lost Tapes of Alan Oakes. Smithsonian Folkways, 2021 (co-producer and liner notes
- Playing for the Man at the Door: Field Recordings from the Collection of Mack McCormick, 1958-1971
