= Hughie Cannon =

American songwriter and pianist

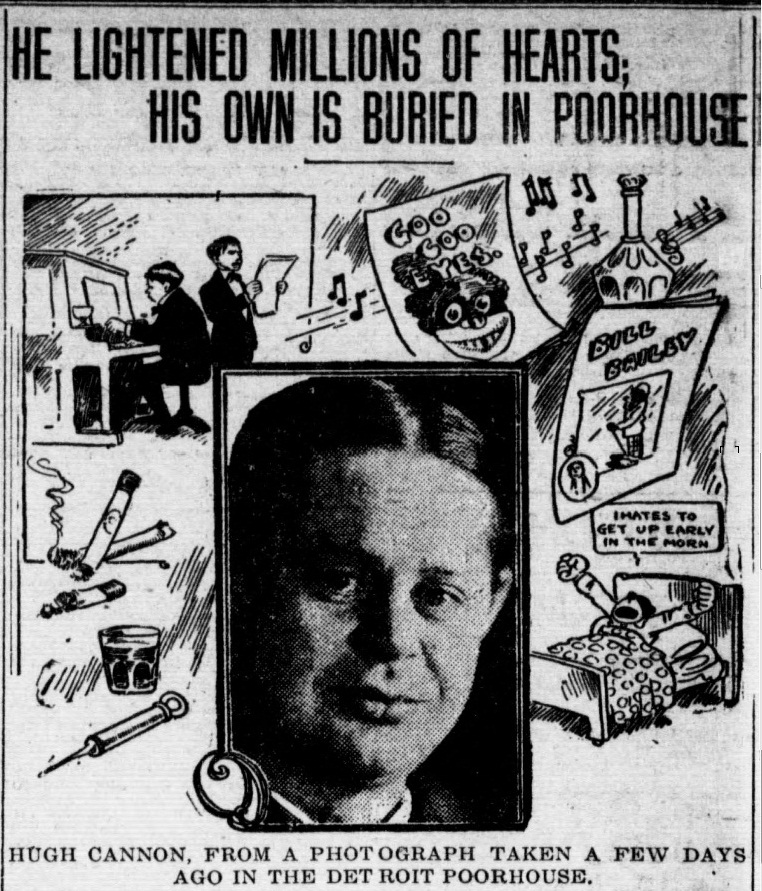
- 1910

Background information
- Born: Hugo Cannon; April 9, 1877; Detroit, Michigan, United States
- Died: June 17, 1912 (aged 35) Toledo, Ohio, United States
- Genres: Broadway musicals, revues, show tunes
- Occupations: Songwriter, composer, lyricist
- Years active: 1899–1912

Hugo Cannon (April 9, 1877 – June 17, 1912) was an American songwriter and pianist whose best-known composition was the popular ragtime song "(Won't You Come Home) Bill Bailey".

== Biography ==
Cannon was born in Detroit, Michigan in 1877. He began performing with Barlow's Minstrels in the 1890s, as a singer, dancer, and piano player, often working with actor John Queen and having several songs published. He occasionally worked as a bar pianist in Jackson, Michigan, where he met local musician Willard "Bill" Bailey. Reportedly, on one occasion in 1902, Bailey was talking to Cannon about the state of his marriage to Sarah (née Siegrist). Cannon "was inspired to rattle off a ditty about Bailey’s irregular hours." Bailey thought the song was a scream, and he brought home a dashed-off copy of the song to show Sarah. Sarah couldn't see the humor.... [but] accepted without comment the picture it drew of her as a wife." Cannon sold all rights to the song to a New York publisher. The tune is similar to an earlier song, "Ain't Dat a Shame" credited to Queen and Walter Wilson.

After publication the song quickly became a hit and then a standard, has been covered many times since by a wide range of singers, including Louis Armstrong, Ella Fitzgerald, Pearl Bailey, Marion Montgomery, Aretha Franklin, and Bobby Darin. The song became an instant success following its first performance by John Queen.

Another of the author's long-lasting hits is "Frankie and Johnny", published in 1904. Cannon wrote the featured song "I Love the Two Steps (With My Man)" for the New York show 'Mrs. Black Is Back', which opened in 1904 and ran for 79 performances. Mrs. Black was played by May Irwin, who also appeared in one of Thomas Edison's earliest productions, "The Kiss." Cannon also wrote music for "A Venetian Romance" at the Knickerbocker Theater.

Cannon's other songs include "For Lawdy Sakes, Feed My Dog", "I Hates To Get Up Early In The Morning", "Possum Pie", "Just Because She Made Dem Goo-Goo Eyes" and "You Needn't Come Home."

== Death ==
Cannon died at the age of 35 at the Lucas County, Ohio, Infirmary. The official cause of death was cirrhosis. Not long before his death, Cannon told a Detroit newspaper that he sold off the rights to most of his songs. In a letter to his mother he lamented "the songs I once had." He told the same newspaper that while he also used drugs, it was alcohol that was the hardest to kick. A brief marriage to Emma Dorsin ended in divorce, the final decree handed to her just hours after his death. Cannon died penniless.

He was buried in Connellsville, Pennsylvania, where his mother lived. His mother, May Brown Cannon Smith Robbins, had been in show business and had played the role of "Little Trixie" in a production that toured the nation for several years in the late 1800s. By the time her son became a well-known composer she was managing a theater in Connellsville with the help of her third husband Fred G. Robbins. Not much is known about the composer's actor father, John Cannon.

== Criticism ==
Musicologist Peter Muir remarked that "You Needn't Come Home" was "truly remarkable for 1901" for its unusual use of 12-bar arrangements for both chorus and verse. "In terms of popular songs at the turn of the century, the enterprise, to the best of my knowledge, is quite unique." Thornton Hagert (founder of Vernacular Music Research), in 1971, noted Cannon's use of a 12-bar structure. "A few" of Cannon's better-known songs, Hagert found, "are very close to the classic blues structure." Two years after "Bill Bailey" swept the nation, Cannon composed a tune called "He Done Me Wrong." This "death of Bill Bailey" tune is sad, Muir noting "a powerful ambivalence often found in the blues." Muir argued that Cannon's "music represents in its way the birth of commercial blues in American culture."
