= Radomski =

Radomski or Radomsky is a surname. The feminine form is Radomska. Notable people with the surname include:

- Adam S. Radomsky, Canadian psychologist
- Arkadiusz Radomski (born 1977), Polish footballer
- Eric Radomski, American television producer
- Inna Osypenko-Radomska (born 1982), Ukrainian sprint kayaker
- Kerstin Radomski (born 1974), German politician
- Kirk Radomski (born 1969), American money launderer
- Metro Radomsky (1910–1995), Ukrainian-Canadian musician
- Mikołaj Radomski, early 15th century Polish composer
- Paul Radomski (1902–1945), German Nazi concentration camp commander

== See also ==
- Radom County (powiat radomski), an administrative division in eastern Poland
