= Charles K. Wolfe =

Charles Keith Wolfe (August 14, 1943 – February 9, 2006) was a professor of English in Tennessee who travelled in the American South to interview, record, and document musicians and other people involved in making American vernacular music. His recordings and documents are catalogued in a collection at the Center for Popular Music at Middle Tennessee State University. He wrote a book with Kip Lornell on Leadbelly.

== Early life and education ==
Wolfe was born in Sedalia, Missouri to Orville and Dilla Wolfe. Born into a musical family he learned to play various instruments. He graduated from Southwest Missouri State University with B.A. in English. He began a 35-year career as a professor of English at Middle Tennessee State University in Murfreesboro, Tennessee in 1970. He received a Ph.D. in 1971 from University of Kansas.

== Family ==
He married nurse Mary Dean King August 21, 1966. He was working as a technician at a hospital in Springfield, Missouri. They had two daughters, Marian Stacey and Cynthia Dean.

== Music scholarship ==
He travelled to meet gospel and country musicians in Tennessee. He conducted interviews and made sound recordings in the field. He wrote articles, reviews, and liner notes. He retired in 2005. His collection of recordings was eventually donated to the Center for Popular Music.

== Honors ==
He received an ASCAP-Deems Taylor Award, an Association for Recorded Sound Collections’ Lifetime Achievement Award, the International Bluegrass Music Association’s Distinguished Achievement Award, and was a three-time Grammy Award nominee, including one in the category Best Album Notes. He was inducted into the International Bluegrass Music Hall of Fame.

== Legacy ==
His work is catalogued and maintained as the Wolfe Audio Collection. It includes oral histories and interviews as well as recordings and documentation of country, old time, and string band music, fiddling, blues, classic jazz, folk ballad, blues, western swing, Hawaiian, folk song, shape note singing, singing school tradition, gospel quartet singing, and rockabilly.
