= Stan Cornyn =

Record label executive

- Born: July 8, 1933; Oxnard, California
- Died: May 11, 2015 (aged 81) Carpinteria, California, U.S.
- Occupation: Record label executive
- Years active: 1958–1990
- Labels: Warner Bros. Records, Reprise Records, Warner Music Group
- Formerly of: Frank Sinatra, Petula Clark, Dean Martin, The Kinks, Nancy Sinatra, Bill Cosby, Anita Kerr

Carl Stanley Cornyn (July 8, 1933 – May 11, 2015) was an American record label executive. He wrote Exploding: The Highs, Hits, Hype, Heroes, and Hustlers of the Warner Music Group (ISBN 978-0380978526), and authored three privately published family genealogy books (all in the Library of Congress).

== Career ==
Cornyn began working for Warner Bros. Records in 1958. He left the Warner Music Group in 1990 to live an office-free life. During his Warner years, he advanced to Executive VP of Warner Bros. Records; then to Senior VP of the Warner Music Group; and finally Founder and CEO of Warner New Media within Time-Warner. He is widely remembered for his years heading up Warner-Reprise's Creative Services department, writing innovative ads, and other marketing approaches, including the storied Warner/Reprise Loss Leaders series.

He was awarded the Grammy Award for Best Album Notes in 1966 for Frank Sinatra's Strangers in the Night and again in 1967 for Sinatra at the Sands. He was nominated again in 1968 and 1969 for his work on Sinatra and Duke Ellington's Francis A. & Edward K. and Sinatra and Antônio Carlos Jobim's Francis Albert Sinatra & Antonio Carlos Jobim recordings, beaten both times by Johnny Cash. His work gained one additional nomination in 1974 for Sinatra's Ol' Blue Eyes Is Back.

The literary qualities of his liner notes are discussed in A Storied Singer: Frank Sinatra as Literary Conceit in a chapter entitled "The Composition of Celebrity: Sinatra as Text in the Liner Notes of Stan Cornyn."

He also co-authored the screenplay for the 1970 Warner Bros.' film The Phynx.

In 1989, while heading Warner New Media, Cornyn introduced a new multimedia format called CD+Graphics, or CD+G. Stan also envisioned "The Whole Megillah." As a result, Stan's people at Warner New Media (WNM) built a Megillah Project demonstration system, which was widely viewed within Warner Communications, and resulted in patent 5161034. This patent was later linked to Time Warner's DVD work. WNM also published several interactive multimedia compact discs, such as "How Computers Work" and "Desert Storm."

In 1991 he was asked to lead the short-lived computer games division of Media Vision, Inc., and was named executive vice-president and co-head of Media Vision Multimedia Publishing, heading its Westlake Village offices.

== Education ==
Cornyn was a graduate of Monrovia High School, Pomona College. He attended Yale Graduate School of Arts and Sciences and received a master's degree in theatre from the University of California at Los Angeles in 1962.

== Family ==
Cornyn was twice married. First, in 1965, to Gail MacCrystall, with whom he fathered son Christopher Cornyn; then, in 1971, to Theadora Davitt, by whom he had son Tom Cornyn.

Cornyn was nephew to William Cornyn, previously the chair of both the Department of Slavic Languages and Literature and the Russian Area Program at Yale University; and John Cornyn II, who was the father of U.S. Senator John Cornyn III (R. TX).

Cornyn lived in Carpinteria, California, with his longtime companion Meg Barbour. He died at home on May 11, 2015, at the age of 81.
