= Metro Radomsky =

Metro Radomsky (Ukrainian: Метро Радомський) (born in 1910 in Lamont County, Alberta, died in 1995) was a well-known Ukrainian Canadian fiddle player of the twentieth century. His band was one of the earliest bands to record Ukrainian music in the Canadian Prairies in the 1930s; his orchestra continued playing until 1989.

== Biography ==
=== Early life ===
Radomsky was born in 1910 as one of four children in Kahwin, Lamont County, a farming area near Edmonton, Alberta. The 1916 Canadian Census lists his father Porpri Radomsky, born around 1875 and his mother Maysta Radomsky, born around 1882, both from Bukovina and having arrived in Canada in 1902.

Because he seemed interested in music from a young age, his father bought him a second-hand violin at age nine. He played his first wedding at age twelve. He initially learned by ear, and for a time he took lessons from Walter Holowach, a classical violinist in Edmonton who had studied in Vienna. It was suggested that Metro should follow his teacher's path and also study in Vienna, but he declined.

When Radomsky was 17, his father died, and he was forced to take over the family farm.

He married his wife Jean Tkachuk in 1934 and they had three children.

=== Musical career ===
Radomsky first founded his band, the Radomsky Orchestra in 1928. The original format of the band was the traditional Ukrainian folk music trio or troista muzyka -- violin, hammered dulcimer (tsymbaly) and drum. That format, with dulcimer player Metro Lastiwka, can be heard on some of the 78 rpm records they recorded in the early 1950s for Stinson Records.

The band quickly became popular, especially for Ukrainian weddings and other social functions. According to former members of his orchestra from the 1930s, the band would often be paid five dollars for a three-day wedding. They were so popular that some families scheduled their weddings on weekdays, or rescheduled already-planned weddings, to be able to book them.

He continued being a farmer until around 1945, when he became an elevator agent for the Pioneer company in Wostok, Alberta.

His band continued to be in demand in the postwar era. The lineup expanded to include saxophone, accordions, trumpets, and other instruments, in keeping with shifting trends in Ukrainian-Canadian music. His son recalled that in 1952 for a time they played for 22 nights in a row. He mostly played in Edmonton and Northern Alberta, although occasionally traveled to play concerts in Lethbridge, Calgary, Winnipeg, or Prince George, British Columbia.

The band remained popular in the 1960s and 1970s at the height of the popularity of Ukrainian Canadian fiddle music, when dozens of records were being put out by labels such as Winnipeg's V-Records. Radomsky recorded a number of LPs for labels such as Ukadian, DSLP, Heritage, and Maple Haze.

In 1989, Radomsky was diagnosed with Alzheimer's disease, in addition to a previous diagnosis of Parkinson's disease, so he decided to finally retire from music. In 1992 he was awarded an Excellence in Artistry Award from the Alberta Council for Ukrainian Arts.

Radomsky died in 1995.

== Selected discography ==
- Kozak/Ukrainiska Polka (Stinson Records, UK 200)
- Bublichky/Oy Ty Divchyno (Stinson Records, UK 201)
- Chom, Chom, Chom/Vypriahaite Koni (Stinson Records, UK 222)
- Tam Na Hori/Paraska. (Stinson Records, UK 221)
- Wedding Polka/Brodska Polka. (Stinson Records, UK 202)
- Radomski Ensemble (Ukadian Records)
- Metro Radomski and his Ensemble (DS-LP 9)
- Ukrainian Night At The Norwood Legion Featuring Radomsky's Orchestra "Live" (Heritage Records, c.1977)
- Ukrainian Gold with Metro Radomsky (LEI Stereo, LS 10430, 1978)
