= Wostok =

- Hamlet
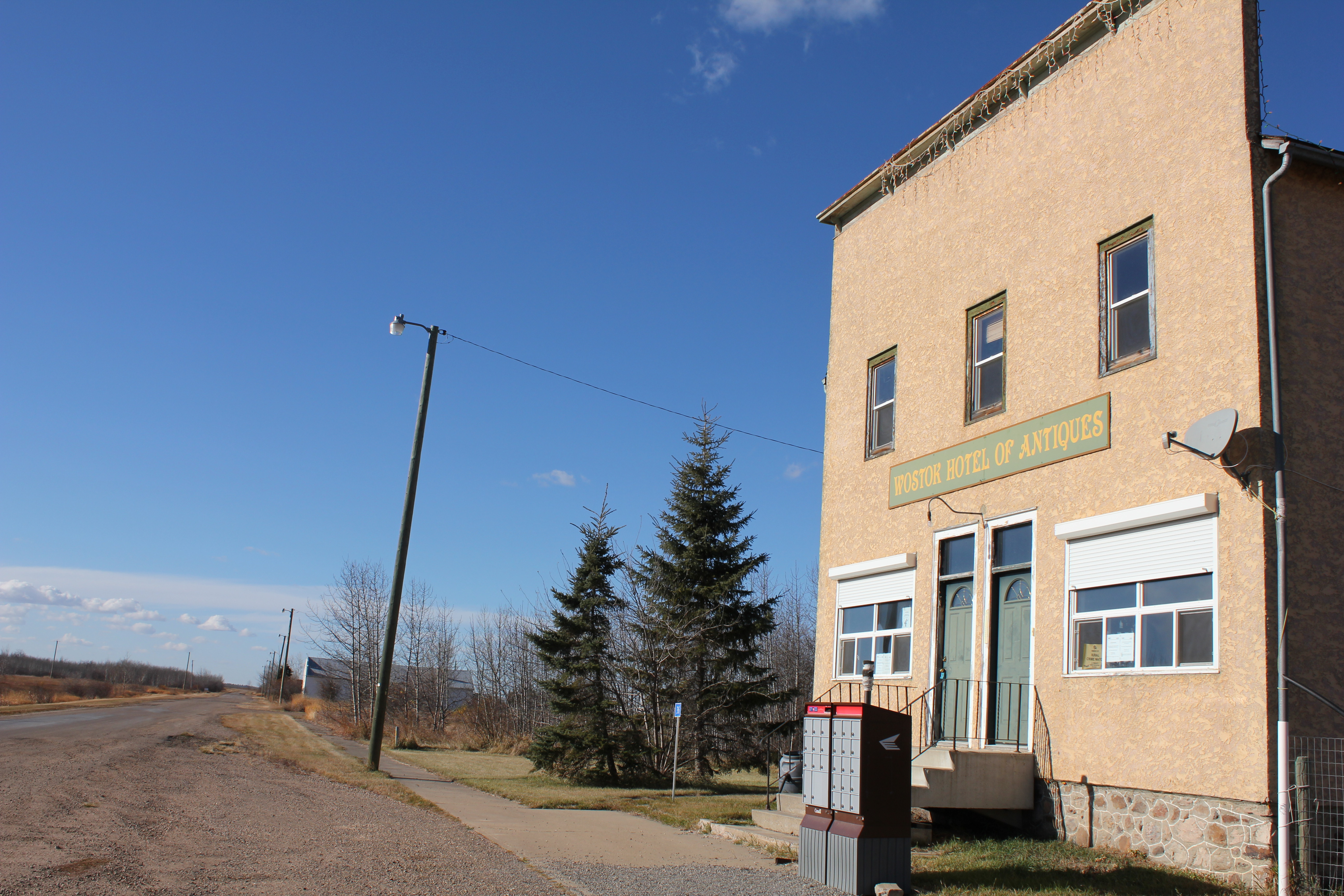
- One of the few buildings in the hamlet of Wostok

- Location of Wostok in Alberta
- Coordinates: 53°50′31″N 112°27′41″W
- Country: Canada
- Province: Alberta
- Region: Central Alberta
- Census division: 10
- Municipal district: Lamont County
- Elevation: 639 m (2,096 ft)

Population (1991)
  - Total: 15
- Time zone: UTC−06:00 (Alberta Time)
- Highways: Highway 45 and Highway 29

Wostok (Russian: Восток) is a hamlet in Alberta, Canada within Lamont County. It is located on Range Road 173, approximately 5 kilometres (3.1 mi) south of Highway 45 and 8 kilometres (5.0 mi) north of Highway 29. Lamont is approximately 23 kilometres (14 mi) southwest of Wostok.

== Toponymy ==
Wostok, named for the Russian word for east ("восток"), was named by the predominantly Slavic settlers who established the community in the 1890s.

== History ==
=== 19th century ===
Beginning in 1892, Wostok was settled by Slavic immigrants from the Austro-Hungarian provinces of Galicia and Bukovina, who arrived in the region to farm. The earliest settlers were predominantly ethnic Ukrainians or Poles.

In 1897, locals successfully petitioned the Russian Orthodox Mission in San Francisco to assign clergy to the area. The first Orthodox Divine Liturgy held in Canada subsequently occurred in Wostok on July 18, 1897, with over 300 homesteaders from surrounding areas attending the community to participate.

A post office was established under the name Wostok in January 1899 by Theodore Nemirsky, who thus became Canada's first Ukrainian postmaster. Later that year, residents built a permanent Orthodox church building, Holy Trinity Russo-Orthodox Church. This church would ultimately be rebuilt twice at the same site due to fires: first in 1907, and secondly in 1938. Three more churches were built around Wostok during its early years, among them St. Nickolas Church.

=== 20th century ===
For its first two decades as a settlement, Wostok was a modest farming community, until a stronger agricultural economy after the First World War allowed the hamlet to expand.

In 1920, Wostok School, which had been established in 1906, expanded to incorporate a second building. At its height, the community hosted a hotel, blacksmith, and several commercial stores. One hardware store, built by farmer Vasyl Knysh in 1938, was later moved to the Ukrainian Cultural Heritage Village living museum, where it is accessible as of 2026.

Later that decade, the Canadian Northern Railway established a siding around four miles from the original Wostok site. The community moved closer to the railway line, effectively partitioning Wostok; residents also took advantage of the new transport connections to relocate to new localities. Wostok began to depopulate: its school closed in 1951, and its commercial outlets had largely closed by 1968.

=== 21st century ===
St. Nickolas Orthodox Church hosted festivities to celebrate its centennial in June 2000, and its 110th anniversary in 2010.

== Demographics ==
As of 2020, Wostok contains a small number of residential and agricultural properties. The hamlet recorded a population of 15 in the 1991 Census of Population conducted by Statistics Canada.

== Services ==
Power is provided to the Wostok area through the Zawale Rural Electrification Association.

== Places of interest ==
=== Recreation ===
Wostok Community Hall remains in occasional use as of 2020.

=== Places of worship ===
As of 2026, St. Nickolas Orthodox Church and the Holy Trinity Russo-Orthodox Church remain open to visitors, as do their respective cemeteries. A commemorative cross, installed by the Orthodox Church of Canada, marks the spot of the former homestead where the first Divine Liturgy held in Canada took place.

== Notable people ==
- Metro Radomsky (1910 – 1995) – long-term resident of Wostok; farmer and musician

== See also ==
- List of communities in Alberta
- List of hamlets in Alberta
