= Robert Tuggle =

American writer on music

Robert Tuggle (April 17, 1932, Martinsville, Virginia – January 21, 2016, New York City) was an American writer on music and a long-time staff member at the Metropolitan Opera from 1961–2015. In 1987 he was nominated for the Grammy Award for Best Album Notes for the Met's recording of The Mapleson Cylinders. His book The Golden Age of Opera was published by Holt McDougal in 1983.

== Life and career ==
Born in Martinsville, Virginia, Tuggle was the son of Howard Irvine Tuggle, an executive at Coca-Cola, and Marguerite Tuggle (née Roper). He earned a degree in musicology from Princeton University in 1954 where his thesis was on Giuseppe Verdi. He then served in the Field Artillery Branch of the United States Army for two years before joining the staff of the Metropolitan Opera in the education department in 1957.

From 1961–77 Tuggle was the director of the education department at the Met; overseeing the company's goal to engage students and teachers with the artform of opera. He penned several teacher's guides to the opera and oversaw the first ever opera performance at the newly built Metropolitan Opera House on April 11, 1966; a student matinee performance of La Fanciulla del West that was a "sound test" prior to the theater's official opening. He was also responsible for commissioning Al Carmines's one act opera The Duel which premiered in Brooklyn in 1974.

In 1981 Tuggle became Director of the Archives at the Metropolitan Opera; a post he held for the next thirty-four years. He was instrumental in the creation of the Met's digital database of performances, launched in 2005, which is available to the public for free online.

== Personal life ==
Tuggle's long time life partner was writer Paul Jeromack.
