= David Briggs (American musician) =

American keyboardist and record producer (1943–2025)

- Born: David Paul Briggs; March 16, 1943; Killen, Alabama, U.S.
- Died: April 22, 2025 (aged 82) Nashville, Tennessee, U.S.
- Genres: Rock, pop, country
- Occupations: Record producer, musician
- Instruments: Keyboards
- Formerly of: Elvis Presley, Roy Orbison, Joan Baez, J. J. Cale, Jimmy Buffett

David Paul Briggs (March 16, 1943 – April 22, 2025) was an American keyboardist, record producer, arranger, composer and studio owner. Briggs was one of an elite core of Nashville studio musicians known as "the Nashville Cats" and was featured in a major exhibition by the Country Music Hall of Fame in 2015. He played his first recording session at the age of 14 and went on to add keyboards to a plethora of pop, rock, and country artists, as well as recording hundreds of corporate commercials. He was born in Killen, Alabama.

== Life and career ==
In May 1966, he was given the opportunity of recording on sessions for Elvis Presley's album How Great Thou Art when Floyd Cramer was running late. Briggs continued to record and tour with Presley until February 1977. Briggs was later the producer of several posthumous Presley remix projects, such as "The Elvis Medley" (1982) and I Was the One (1983), co-producing the latter with Tony Brown.

Briggs and Norbert Putnam opened Quadrafonic Studios in the late 1960s. It was sold in 1976 and Briggs opened House of David.

Briggs was a recording artist on Decca, Polydor and Monument records in the mid to late 1960s and member of the band Area Code 615 from 1969 to 1971.

Artists he worked with include Elvis Presley, Dean Martin, Joan Baez, Nancy Sinatra, B.B. King, Johnny Cash, Dolly Parton, Waylon Jennings, Tony Joe White, George Harrison, Todd Rundgren, Roy Orbison, The Monkees, J. J. Cale, Kris Kristofferson, Alice Cooper, Gary Stewart, Charley Pride, and many others.

Briggs was inducted into the Alabama Music Hall of Fame in 1999.

Briggs was inducted into the Musicians Hall of Fame and Museum in 2019.

Briggs died of renal cancer in Nashville, on April 22, 2025, at the age of 82.
