= Elvis Aron Presley (box set) =

Compilation album by Elvis Presley
- Released: August 1980
- Recorded: 1956–1977
- Genre: Rock
- Length: 4:24:35
- Label: RCA Victor

Elvis Presley chronology
Our Memories of Elvis Volume 2 (1979)	Elvis Aron Presley (1980)	Guitar Man (1981)

Elvis Aron Presley is a compilation box set by American singer and musician Elvis Presley. The eight-record set was released in August 1980 as his first posthumous box set album that wasn't released via mail order. The set peaked at number 27 on the Billboard 200 and at number 8 on the country chart. It was certified Gold and then Platinum on June 17, 1992 by the Recording Industry Association of America. Almost all of the tracks were unreleased at the time and the box set has the distinction of being the highest charted 8-LP album of any artist.

As well as also releasing 8-track and cassette versions in 1980, a 4-CD package was available in 1998.

== Track listing ==
=== Side one - An Early Live Performance ===
1. "Heartbreak Hotel" - 2:00
2. "Long Tall Sally" - 1:37
3. "Blue Suede Shoes" - 2:37
4. "Money Honey" - 2:21

=== Side two - Monolog ===
1. "An Elvis Monolog" - 13:41

=== Side three - An Early Benefit Performance - Part 1 ===
1. "Heartbreak Hotel" - 2:14
2. "All Shook Up" - 1:45
3. "(Now And Then There's) A Fool Such As I" - 2:41
4. "I Got A Woman" - 2:18
5. "Love Me" - 2:39
6. "Introductions" - 1:27
7. "Such A Night" - 2:23
8. "Reconsider Baby" - 3:20

=== Side four - An Early Benefit Performance - Conclusion ===
1. "I Need Your Love Tonight" - 1:50
2. "That's All Right" - 1:38
3. "Don't Be Cruel" - 1:52
4. "One Night" - 2:35
5. "Are You Lonesome Tonight?" - 3:11
6. "It's Now or Never" - 2:40
7. "Swing Down Sweet Chariot" - 2:31
8. "Hound Dog" - 2:57

=== Side five - Collectors' Gold From The Movie Years ===
1. "They Remind Me Too Much of You" - 2:39
2. "Tonight Is So Right For Love" - 4:11
3. "Follow That Dream" - 1:49
4. "Wild in the Country" - 1:48
5. "Datin'" - 3:11

=== Side six - Collectors' Gold From The Movie Years ===
1. "Shoppin' Around" - 3:04
2. "Can't Help Falling In Love" - 1:48
3. "A Dog's Life - 3:20
4. "I'm Falling In Love Tonight" - 3:15
5. "Thanks To The Rolling Sea" - 1:16

=== Side seven - The TV Specials ===
1. "Jailhouse Rock" - 2:06
2. "Suspicious Minds" - 4:34
3. "Lawdy Miss Clawdy"/"Baby What You Want Me to Do" (Medley) - 4:54
4. "Blue Christmas" - 2:46

=== Side eight - The TV Specials ===
1. "You Gave Me a Mountain" - 3:32
2. "Welcome to My World" - 2:00
3. "Trying to Get to You" - 2:10
4. "I'll Remember You" - 2:41
5. "My Way" - 3:51

=== Side nine - The Las Vegas Years ===
1. "Polk Salad Annie" - 5:34
2. "You've Lost That Lovin' Feelin'" - 4:15
3. "Sweet Caroline" - 2:44
4. "Kentucky Rain" - 3:19
5. "Are You Lonesome Tonight?" 2:51

=== Side ten - The Las Vegas Years ===
1. "My Babe" - 2:36
2. "In The Ghetto" - 2:37
3. "An American Trilogy" - 4:37
4. "Little Sister"/"Get Back" (Medley) - 3:10
5. "Yesterday" - 2:26

=== Side eleven - Lost Singles ===
1. "I'm Leavin'" - 3:48
2. "The First Time Ever I Saw Your Face" - 3:42
3. "Hi-Heel Sneakers" - 2:46
4. "Softly, as I Leave You" - 3:00

=== Side twelve - Lost Singles ===
1. "Unchained Melody" - 3:26
2. "Fool" - 2:35
3. "Rags to Riches" - 1:55
4. "It's Only Love" - 2:42
5. "America the Beautiful" - 2:17

=== Side thirteen - Elvis At The Piano ===
1. "It's Still Here" - 3:53
2. "I'll Take You Home Again, Kathleen" - 2:28
3. "Beyond the Reef" - 3:06
4. "I Will Be True" - 2:34

=== Side fourteen - The Concert Years—Part 1 ===
1. "Also Sprach Zarathustra (Theme From 2001: A Space Odyssey)" - 0:10
2. "See See Rider" - 2:23
3. "I Got A Woman"/"Amen"/"I Got A Woman" (Medley) - 3:54
4. "Love Me" - 2:16
5. "If You Love Me (Let Me Know)" - 2:44
6. "Love Me Tender" - 2:20
7. "All Shook Up" - 1:01
8. "(Let Me Be Your) Teddy Bear"/"Don't Be Cruel" (Medley) - 1:44

=== Side fifteen - The Concert Years—Part 2 ===
1. "Hound Dog" - 1:26
2. "The Wonder of You" - 1:59
3. "Burning Love" - 2:46
4. Dialog/Introductions/"Johnny B. Goode" - 4:08
5. Introductions/"Long Live Rock and Roll" - 1:58
6. "T-R-O-U-B-L-E" - 3:10
7. "Why Me Lord" - 2:29

=== Side sixteen - The Concert Years—Part 3 (Conclusion) ===
1. "How Great Thou Art" - 4:10
2. "Let Me Be There" - 3:12
3. "An American Trilogy" - 3:42
4. "Funny How Time Slips Away" - 2:24
5. "Little Darlin'" - 1:37
6. "Mystery Train"/"Tiger Man" (Medley) - 2:17
7. "Can't Help Falling In Love" - 1:37

== Charts ==
1980 chart performance for Elvis Aron Presley
Chart (1980)	Peak position
Canadian Albums (Billboard)	2
UK Albums (Official Charts)	21
US Billboard 200	27
US Top Country Albums (Billboard)	8

== Certifications ==
Region	Certification	Certified units/sales
United States (RIAA)	Platinum	1,000,000^{^}
^{^} Shipments figures based on certification alone.
