= Tony Brown (music producer) =

American record producer and pianist (born 1946)

- Also known as: Tarzan (with J.D. Sumner)
- Born: December 11, 1946 (age 79); Greensboro, North Carolina, U.S.
- Origin: Walkertown, North Carolina
- Genres: Country; Southern Gospel; Americana
- Occupations: Session musician; record producer; music executive
- Instrument: Piano
- Years active: 1960s–present
- Formerly of: TCB Band; The Notorious Cherry Bombs

Tony Brown (born December 11, 1946) is an American record producer and pianist, known primarily for his work in country music. A former member of the Stamps Quartet and backing musician for Emmylou Harris, Brown has primarily worked as a producer since the late 1980s. He is known primarily for his production work with Reba McEntire, Vince Gill, and George Strait.

Brown was inducted into the Country Music Hall of Fame in 2025.

== History ==
Following stints with the Dixie Melody Boys and Trav'lers Quartets, he joined J. D. Sumner and the Stamps Quartet in 1966. In 1972, he traveled briefly with the Blackwood Brothers, thereafter joining the Oak Ridge Boys as a member of the Mighty Oaks Band. Brown also played piano for Elvis Presley. He toured with the TCB Band for much of Presley's final two years and was a part of the 1976 "Jungle Room" recording sessions at Graceland. In 1979, he joined Emmylou Harris's backing band, the Hot Band, taking over for former Presley sideman Glen D. Hardin. Brown stayed with Harris until 1981. Later, he became a session musician in Nashville and toured with acts such as Rosanne Cash. In the 1980s, he was also the keyboardist for the Cherry Bombs, Rodney Crowell's backing band.

Brown later became a successful record producer, and was also the president of MCA Nashville. Some of the acts he produced include Reba McEntire, Trisha Yearwood, George Strait, Brooks & Dunn, Rodney Crowell, Steve Earle, Lyle Lovett, Kelly Willis, Vince Gill, the Mavericks, McBride & the Ride, Tracy Byrd, Mark Chesnutt, David Lee Murphy, Marty Stuart, Patty Loveless, Pat Green, Chely Wright and Wynonna. Alongside David Briggs, Brown co-produced Presley's posthumous remix album I Was the One (1983). His career has yielded over 100 number 1 singles and record sales from his signings and productions have exceeded the 100 million mark.

In 2002, Brown exited his position at MCA and co-founded Universal South Records, a joint venture with Universal Records and long-time record executive Tim DuBois. The label's roster included Joe Nichols, Matthew West, Allison Moorer, Rockie Lynne, Shooter Jennings, Cross Canadian Ragweed, Bering Strait, Katrina Elam, Holly Williams and Matt Jenkins.

He produced the majority of tracks for one of 2012's highest grossing albums, Tuskegee, with award-winning artist Lionel Richie, featuring duets with Blake Shelton, Jason Aldean, Darius Rucker, Tim McGraw, Jimmy Buffett, Little Big Town, Kenny Rogers and Willie Nelson.

A four-time Grammy Award winner, he has also been the recipient of four Academy of Country Music Awards, including the prestigious ACM Producer of the Year Award. In 1994, with numerous Gold, Platinum, and multi-Platinum albums to his credit, he was honored with a Grammy nomination for Producer of the Year, the first time a member of the country music recording industry had been in contention for that award since 1979.

Commercial success aside, Brown is often thought to be the founding father of the alternative 'Americana' country movement, having signed (and produced) genre bending artists such as Rodney Crowell, Steve Earle, Joe Ely, Lyle Lovett, Kelly Willis, Todd Snider, Allison Moorer, the Mavericks, Shooter Jennings and more.

== Personal life ==
Brown's first marriage was to Janie Levin, with whom he had two children: Brennan and Brandi. He was later married to Anastasia Pruitt from 1999 until their divorce in 2009.

During a business dinner on April 11, 2003, Brown fell down a flight of stairs, resulting in a brain injury. He underwent two surgeries and fully recovered.

Awards
Preceded by Jim Dickinson	AMA Lifetime Achievement Award for Producer/Engineer; 2008	Succeeded by Jim Rooney
