= Are You Sincere =

1957 song written by Wayne Walker

"Are You Sincere?"
- Japanese release picture sleeve

Single by Andy Williams
- B-side: "Be Mine Tonight"
- Released: February 1958
- Recorded: December 12, 1957
- Genre: Easy listening
- Length: 2:44
- Label: Cadence
- Songwriter: Wayne Walker
- Producer: Archie Bleyer

Andy Williams singles chronology
"Lips of Wine" (1957)	"Are You Sincere?" (1958)	"Promise Me, Love" (1958)

"Are You Sincere?"

Single by Elvis Presley

from the album Our Memories of Elvis
- B-side: "Solitaire"
- Released: March 23, 1979
- Recorded: September 24, 1973
- Studio: Elvis' home in Palm Springs
- Genre: Easy listening, Country
- Length: 2:00
- Label: RCA
- Songwriter: Wayne Walker
- Producer: Felton Jarvis

Elvis Presley singles chronology
"(Let Me Be Your) Teddy Bear" (1978)	"Are You Sincere?" (1979)	"I Got A Feelin' In My Body" (1979)

"Are You Sincere" is a song written by Wayne Walker, originally released in 1957. Andy Williams recorded the song, which Cadence Records issued as a single in 1958, with an orchestra conducted by Archie Bleyer. Since Williams' success, the song has been covered many times in pop and country styles. Notable covers include versions by: The Platters (1959), Eddy Arnold (1961), Gene McDaniels (1961), Marty Robbins (1961), Lenny Welch (1963), Trini Lopez (1965), Ray Anthony (1968), Bobby Vinton (1969), Brook Benton (1970), Jean Shepard (1973), Elvis Presley (1973), Mel Tillis (1979), and Charley Pride (1986).

== Chart performance ==
"Are You Sincere" reached number three on the Billboard Most Played by Disc Jockeys chart.

== Elvis Presley recording ==
Elvis Presley recorded it on September 24, 1973, at his home in Palm Springs, California. It first appeared on the 1973 album Raised on Rock / For Ol' Times Sake, and then saw release as a single after his death, reaching number 10 on the U.S. country chart. It appeared on Disc 4 of Walk a Mile in My Shoes: The Essential '70s Masters.
