= Our Memories of Elvis =

Remix album by Elvis Presley
- Released: February 1979
- Genre: Popular, country
- Label: RCA Records
- Producer: Felton Jarvis; Joan Deary

Elvis Presley chronology
Elvis: A Legendary Performer Volume 3 (1978)	Our Memories of Elvis (1979)	Our Memories of Elvis Volume 2 (1979)

Professional ratings
Review scores
Source	Rating
AllMusic	2/5 stars

Our Memories of Elvis is an Elvis Presley album released in February 1979 by RCA Records. This was the first of two albums in the Our Memories series. As with Volume 2, this album featured 10 songs recorded in the 1970s that were stripped down to just the basic rhythm section and Presley. All overdubs of backup singers, orchestration and horns were removed in the remix. The album spun off just one single release, "Are You Sincere", backed with "Solitaire". The album peaked at number six on the Billboard Top Country albums chart on April 27, 1979, and at number 132 on the Billboard 200 album chart.

== Track listing ==
No.	Title	Writer(s)	Length
1.	"Are You Sincere"	Wayne Walker	3:00
2.	"It's Midnight"	Jerry Chesnut; Billy Edd Wheeler	3:19
3.	"My Boy"	Jean-Pierre Bourtayre; Phil Coulter; Claude François; Bill Martin	2:53
4.	"Girl of Mine"	Barry Mason; Les Reed	3:37
5.	"Take Good Care of Her"	Arthur Kent; Edward C. Warren	2:51
6.	"I'll Never Fall in Love Again"	Jimmy Currie; Lonnie Donegan	3:42
7.	"Your Love's Been a Long Time Coming"	Rory Michael Bourke	2:48
8.	"Spanish Eyes"	Bert Kaempfert; Charles Singleton; Eddie Snyder	2:22
9.	"Never Again"	Jerry Chesnut; Billy Edd Wheeler	2:48
10.	"She Thinks I Still Care"	Dickey Lee Lipscomb	3:50
11.	"Solitaire"	Neil Sedaka; Phil Cody	4:37

== Charts ==
Chart (1979)	Peak position
US Billboard 200	132
US Top Country Albums (Billboard)	6
