= Bill Ivey =

American folklorist and author (1944–2025)

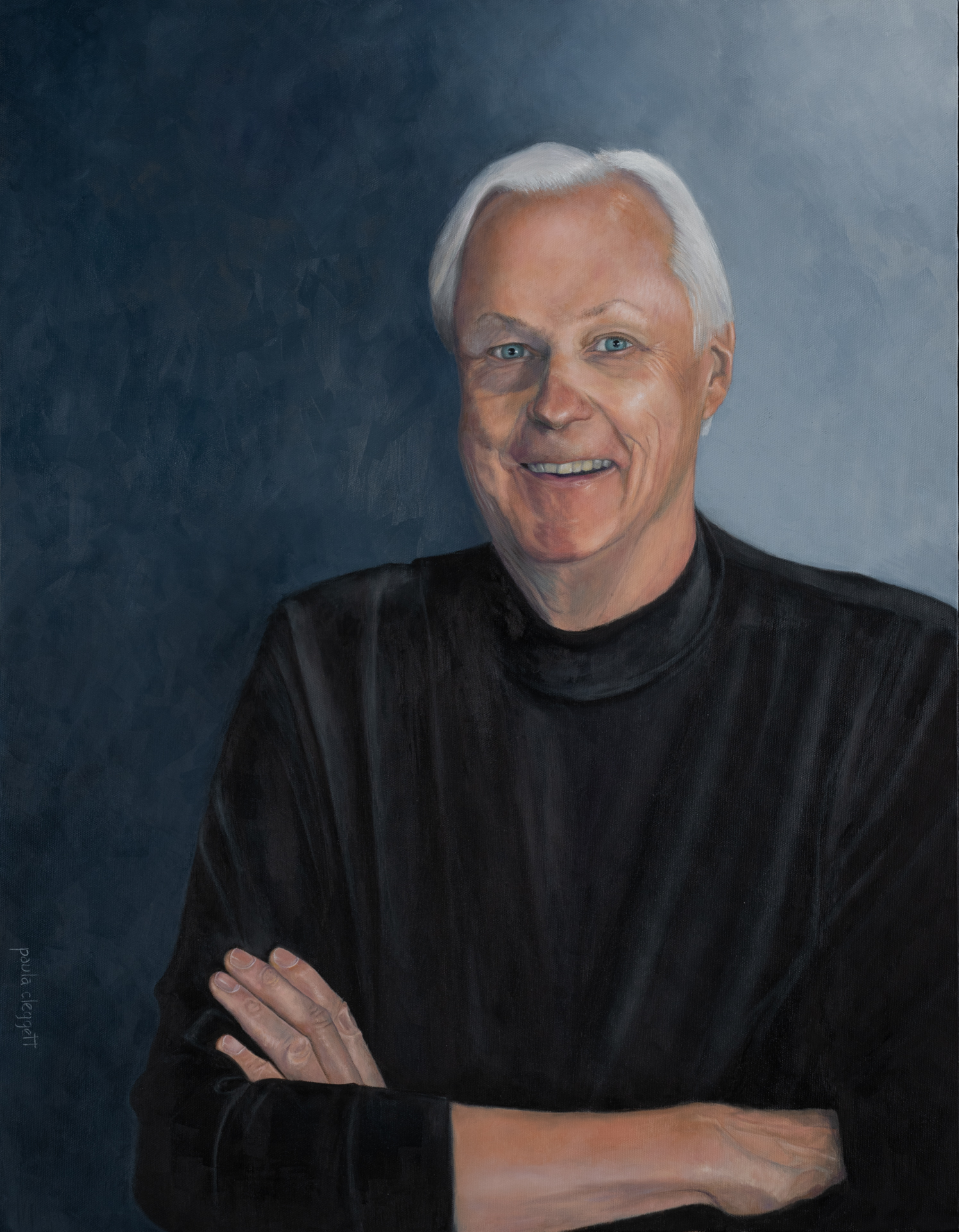
- Portrait of Ivey by artist Paula Cleggett, 2020
- Born: September 6, 1944; Detroit, Michigan, U.S.
- Died: November 7, 2025 (aged 81); Nashville, Tennessee, U.S.
- Education: University of Michigan (BA); Indiana University, Bloomington (MA)
- Partner: Susan Keffer
- Awards: Billboard Country Award; Grammy Award nomination (four times)

William James Ivey (September 6, 1944 – November 7, 2025) was an American folklorist and author. He was chairman of the National Endowment for the Arts (NEA) from 1998 to 2001 and chairman of the National Academy of Recording Arts and Sciences (NARAS) from 1981 to 1983 and 1989 to 1991.

== Early life ==
William James Ivey was born in Detroit, Michigan, on September 6, 1944. He was reared in Calumet, a mining town located in the Keweenaw Peninsula of Michigan's Upper Peninsula. He graduated from the University of Michigan with a degree in American history in 1966, received a master's degree in folklore and ethnomusicology from Indiana University Bloomington in 1970, and became a Ph.D. candidate in folklore and history at that institution in 1971.

== Career ==
Ivey was the first full-time director of the Country Music Foundation and the related Country Music Hall of Fame and Museum, having been promoted to the directorship a few months after first being hired as CMF librarian. He served from 1971 until 1998, though his tenure was not without controversy and scandal. In 1972, Ivey also became the founding editor of the Journal of Country Music, serving as editor until 1975. In 1974, Ivey won a Billboard Country Award for album note writing.

He also served as the chairman of the NARAS from 1981 to 1983 and then again from 1989 to 1991, the only individual elected to two separate terms. In 1983, he said of the organization he headed that, “As time goes on, the Grammys have come closer and closer to satisfying the critics by recognizing what is happening now, but I don't think we will ever get to the point where the critic's choice for the most imaginative and innovative record of the year is going to be the Grammy winner. There will always be a little distance, and that's probably healthy.” In 1988, Ivey was co-writer of the 30th Grammy Awards Telecast, and in 1994 President Bill Clinton appointed Ivey to the President's Committee on the Arts and the Humanities. In 1989, Ivey was one of the founders of Leadership Music, a program that brings together artists and music executives to build a stronger and more collaborative music community in Nashville.

Ivey was appointed chairman of the NEA, by then-President Bill Clinton, serving from 1998 to 2001. His "Challenge America" small-grant initiative is credited with restoring congressional confidence in the sometimes-embattled NEA. He gained national notoriety in 1999 for unilaterally revoking a grant to Cinco Puntos Press to publish La Historia de los Colores, over concerns that the funding might end up in the hands of the Zapatista Army of National Liberation (Zapatistas). The grant was subsequently picked up and doubled by the Lannan Foundation.

Following government service Ivey founded the Curb Center for Art, Enterprise and Public Policy, at Vanderbilt University, serving as director from 2002 to 2012. The center was endowed by Mike Curb, American musician, record company executive, motorsports car owner, and former politician. He returned to Washington in 2007 as team leader in arts and humanities for the Barack Obama presidential transition. Ivey has written and lectured extensively about the importance of cultural policy and the value of cultural engagement in the pursuit of a high quality of life. He coined the phrase "Expressive Life" to define the part of the human experience shaped by cultural heritage and creative practice. From 2007 to 2018, Ivey was senior advisor for China to the American Folklore Society. has been awarded honorary degrees from the University of Michigan, Michigan Technological University, Wayne State University, and Indiana University, and was a four-time Grammy Award nominee in the Best Album Notes category. Ivey served as senior advisor to the Mike Curb Foundation, as a trustee of the Washington, D.C.–based Center for American Progress, and was visiting research scholar to the Indiana University Department of Folklore and Ethnomusicology.

== Television ==
Ivey produced several television shows for the Country Music Foundation, including producing and writing Country Music Hall of Fame: 25. Ivey was advisor to the PBS television series, American Roots Music, and was writer and co-producer of In the Hank Williams Tradition, also on PBS. In 2016, he was co-executive producer of the documentary on the impact of rock music on the collapse of the Soviet Union, Free to Rock.

== Writing ==
In 2007, Ivey co-edited, with Steven Tepper, the book Engaging Art: the Next Great Transformation of America's Cultural, and In 2008 Ivey's book Arts, Inc.: How Greed and Neglect Have Destroyed Our Cultural Rights was published by the University of California Press. Then in 2012, he released the book Handmaking America: A Back-to-Basics Pathway to a Revitalized American Democracy. In 2018, he published the book Rebuilding an Enlightened World: Folklorizing America.

Ivey was also the co-editor of the books The Pocantico Gathering: Happiness and a High Quality of Life – The Role of Art and Art Making, Cultural Awareness in the Military: Developments and Implications for Future Humanitarian Cooperation, and Cultural Discourse: China-US Intangible Cultural Heritage Forums. He has also written articles on the music industry and the role of various players within it. Ivey has also written about music history, including the lack of diverse representation in the early decades of 20th century music recording.

== Personal life and death ==
Ivey lived in Nashville, and at the time of his death, was in a relationship with Susan Keffer. He died at his home from a heart attack on November 7, 2025, at the age of 81.

== Bibliography ==
- Engaging Art : the Next Great Transformation of America's Cultural Life (2007). ISBN 9780415960427
- Arts, Inc.: How Greed and Neglect Have Destroyed Our Cultural Rights. (2008). ISBN 9780520241121
- Handmaking America: A Back-to-Basics Pathway to a Revitalized American Democracy, Counterpoint Press, 2012, ISBN 9781619020535
- Rebuilding an Enlightened World: Folklorizing America, Indiana University Press, 2018
