= The Elvis Medley =

Single by Elvis Presley

from the album The Elvis Medley
- A-side: "The Elvis Medley"
- B-side: "Always on My Mind"
- Released: 1982
- Length: 3:54
- Label: RCA
- Songwriter(s): 1982
- Producer(s): David Briggs

Elvis Presley singles chronology
"Are You Lonesome Tonight? (The Laughing Version)" (1982)	"The Elvis Medley" / "Always on My Mind" (1982)	"(You're So Square) Baby, I Don't Care" (1983)

"The Elvis Medley" is an Elvis Presley medley arranged and produced by David Briggs. The track opened the eponymous LP released in 1982.

Released as a single, with "Always on My Mind" on the B-side, the medley reached number 71 on the Billboard Hot 100.

== Track listing ==
7" single (RCA PB-13351, 1982)

Side A. "The Elvis Medley" – 3:54

"Jailhouse Rock" (Jerry Leiber, Mike Stoller)
"(Let Me Be Your) Teddy Bear" (Bernie Lowe, Kal Mann)
"Hound Dog" (Jerry Leiber, Mike Stoller)
"Don't Be Cruel (to a Heart That's True)" (Elvis Presley, Otis Blackwell)
"Burning Love" (Dennis Linde)
"Suspicious Minds" (Mark James)

Side B. "Always on My Mind" (Johnny Christopher, Mark James, Wayne Thompson) – 3:36

== Charts ==
Chart (1982, 1985)	Peak position
Belgium (Ultratop 50 Flanders)	30
UK Singles (OCC)	51
US Billboard Hot 100	71
US Hot Country Songs (Billboard)	31
