= My Dusty Road =

Compilation album by Woody Guthrie
- Released: 2009
- Recorded: 1944
- Genre: Folk/Americana
- Label: Rounder
- Producers: Moses Asch and Herbert Harris for Stinson Records, reissue producers: Scott Billington, Michael Creamer, and Bill Nowlin

Professional ratings
Aggregate scores
Source	Rating
Metacritic	93/100
Review scores
Source	Rating
AllMusic	4/5 stars
The Austin Chronicle	4/5 stars
The Boston Phoenix	4/4 stars
Filter	86%
The Guardian	5/5 stars
Mojo	5/5 stars
Pitchfork	7.3/10
PopMatters	6/10
Rolling Stone	5/5 stars
Uncut	5/5 stars

My Dusty Road is a 4 CD box set of Woody Guthrie music containing 54 tracks and a book. It is a collection of the newly discovered Stinson master discs. It was released by Rounder Records in 2009.

== Discovering the Stinson Masters ==
According to the album liner notes by Ed Cray and Bill Nowlin, the master discs were housed in the basement of the Brooklyn apartment of Lucia Sutera.

In June 2003, Boston music manager Micheal Creamer was informed by Jim Farrow that he had made contact with Mrs. Sutera, who had inherited a collection of recording masters from her friend Irene Harris.

Irene Harris died of a heart attack in 1999; she was the wife of Robert Harris, the son of the founder of Stinson records, Herbert Harris. Harris had founded Stinson records in 1939 and during the 1940s, he had been in partnership with Moses Asch, the founder of Folkways Records in New York City. During World War II, Stinson had helped Asch to procure shellac, the raw material for manufacturing 78 rpm records which was in short supply due to wartime restrictions.

Ultimately, the recordings of artists like Woody Guthrie, Lead Belly and The Almanac Singers were released under three different labels: Asch, Stinson and Disc.

When Moses Asch went bankrupt in 1947 with the Disc label, some master discs fell to Harris as part of the bankruptcy settlement.

In the years later Asch released the recordings of his artists under the Label Folkways. He also reissued several of the older recordings on his new label. But he could not use the Master discs which were released here for the first time.

== Creating the Woody Guthrie recordings ==
The recordings represented in these Box were made in April and May 1944 in New York City. They were cut partly on aluminum discs or glass masters. The masters were never released on any Folkways or Smithsonian Folkways album. They have clearer sound than older compilations of Guthrie's recordings of that time.

The Box consists of 4 CDs:

1. Woody's "Greatest" Hits
2. Woody's Roots
3. Woody the Agitator
4. Woody, Cisco, and Sonny Jam the Blues, Hollers, and Dances

== Track lists ==
Track	Title	Catalogue No.	Recording Date	Notes / Instrument	Time
Woody's "Greatest" Hits
01.	This Land Is Your Land	Master Ma 114	1944-04	Woody Guthrie vocals and guitar	2:47
02.	Going Down The Road (I Ain't Gonna Be Treated This Way)	Master Ma 711	April 24, 1944	Woody Guthrie mandolin, Cisco Houston guitar, Sonny Terry harmonica	2:59
03.	Talking Sailor	Master Ma 20	April 25, 1944	Woody Guthrie guitar	3:09
04.	Philadelphia Lawyer	Master Ma 36	April 19, 1944	Woody Guthrie guitar	2:35
05.	Hard Travelin'	Master Ma 689		Woody Guthrie mandolin, Cisco Houston guitar, Sonny Terry harmonica	2:41
06.	Jesus Christ	Master Ma 135	1944-04	Woody Guthrie vocal and guitar	2:44
07.	The Sinking of the Reuben James	Master Ma 80		Woody Guthrie vocal and guitar	3:28
08.	Pretty Boy Floyd	Master Ma 57		Woody Guthrie vocal and guitar	3:09
09.	Grand Coulee Dam	Master Ma 17		Woody Guthrie vocal and guitar	2:12
10.	Nine Hundred Miles	Master Ma 702	April 24. 1944	Woody Guthrie mandolin, Cisco Houston guitar, Sonny Terry harmonica	2:54
11.	Going Down The Road (I Ain't Gonna Be Treated This Way)	Master Ma 44		Woody Guthrie guitar, Cisco Houston guitar	3:00
12.	My Daddy (Flies a Ship in the Sky)	Master Ma 14	April 19, 1944	Woody Guthrie guitar	2:36
13.	Bad Reputation	Master Ma 111		Woody Guthrie vocal and guitar	2:50
Woody's Roots
01.	Poor Boy	Master Ma 50		Woody Guthrie vocals and guitar	2:29
02.	Worried Man Blues	Master Ma 47		Woody Guthrie vocals and guitar	3:04
03.	A Picture from Life's Other Side	Master Ma 82		Woody Guthrie vocals and mandolin, Cisco Houston Guitar and harmony vocal	3:08
04.	The Buffalo Skinners	Master 902		Woody Guthrie vocals and guitar	3:23
05.	Hard, Ain't it Hard	Master LM 1	April 16, 1944	Woody Guthrie vocals and mandolin, Cisco Houston guitar	2:43
06.	Stewball	Master Ma 16	April 19, 1944	Woody Guthrie vocals and guitar	3:30
07.	Stackolee	Master Ma 68		Woody Guthrie vocals and guitar	3:04
08.	Gypsy Davy	Master Ma 139		Woody Guthrie vocals and guitar	2:52
09.	Little Darling Pal of Mine	Master Ma 38		Woody Guthrie vocals and guitar, Cisco Houston guitar	2:57
10.	What did the Deep Sea say?	Master Ma 48	April 19, 1944	Woody Guthrie vocals and mandolin, Cisco Houston Guitar and harmony vocal	3:02
11.	Chisholm Trail	Master Ma 29	April 19, 1944	Woody Guthrie vocals, Cisco Houston Guitar	2:39
12.	Put My Little Shoes Away	Master Ma 81	April 24, 1944	Woody Guthrie mandolin, Cisco Houston guitar, Sonny Terry harmonica	2:52
13.	Will You Miss Me When I'm Gone	Master Ma 83		Woody Guthrie mandolin, Cisco Houston guitar	2:39
14.	John Henry	Master Ma 10	April 19, 1944	Woody Guthrie mandolin and vocals, Cisco Houston guitar and vocals	2:39
Woody The Agitator
01.	I'm Gonna Join That One Big Union (you Gotta Go Down and Join the Union)	Master Ma 9	April 19, 1944	Woody Guthrie vocals and guitar	2:32
02.	Hangknot, Slipknot	Master Ma 115		Woody Guthrie vocals and guitar	2:35
03.	Gonna Roll the Union On	Master Ma 118	April 1944	Woody Guthrie vocals and guitar	2:40
04.	Ludlow Massacre	Master 902		Woody Guthrie vocals and guitar	3:35
05.	Sally Don't You Grieve	Master Ma 34	April 19, 1944	Woody Guthrie vocals and guitar	2:26
06.	The Ballad of Harriet Tubman, Part 1	Master 905		Woody Guthrie vocals and guitar	3:24
07.	The Ballad of Harriet Tubman, Part 2	Master 904		Woody Guthrie vocals and guitar	3:12
08.	Tear The Fascists Down	Master Ma 13		Woody Guthrie vocals and guitar	2:09
09.	Yanks Go Marching In	Master Ma 2	April 19, 1944	Woody Guthrie vocals and Mandolin, Cicso Houston guitar and harmony vocals	2:45
10.	You Can Hear My Whistle Blow	Master Ma 35		Woody Guthrie vocals and guitar	2:26
11.	Union Burying Ground	Master Ma 77		Woody Guthrie vocals and guitar	3:08
12.	You Gotta Go Down and Join the Union	Master Ma 46		Woody Guthrie vocals and guitar	2:42
Woody, Cisco, And Sonny Jam The Blues, Hollers, And Dances
01.	Train Breakdown	Master Ma 103		Woody Guthrie guitar, Sonny Terry harmonica	2:34
02.	Do You Ever Think Of Me? (aka At My Window)	Master Ma 89		Woody Guthrie guitar, Sonny Terry harmonica, Cisco Houston guitar and harmony vocals	3:08
03.	Guitar Rag	Master Ma 101		Woody Guthrie guitar, Sonny Terry harmonica	2:22
04.	Square Dance Medley	Master 1225		Woody Guthrie mandolin, Cisco Houston guitar, Sonny Terry harmonica	3:53
05.	Guitar Breakdown	Master Ma 25		Woody Guthrie guitar, Cisco Houston guitar	2:23
06.	Raincrow Bill	Master 699		Woody Guthrie guitar, Sonny Terry harmonica	2:39
07.	Ain't Nobody's Business	Master Ma 42	April 19, 1944	Woody Guthrie mandolin, Cisco Houston guitar, Sonny Terry harmonica	2:45
08.	Goodbye to My Stepstone	Master MA 94	April 25, 1944	Woody Guthrie Vocals and Mandolin, Cisco Houston guitar and harmony vocals, Sonny Terry harmonica	2:55
09.	Ezekiel Saw the Wheel	Master Ma 88		Woody Guthrie Vocals and Mandolin, Cisco Houston guitar and harmony vocals, Sonny Terry harmonica	2:45
10.	Bile Them Cabbage Down	Master Ma 140		Woody Guthrie Vocals and Fiddle, Cisco Houston guitar and harmony vocals, Sonny Terry harmonica	2:49
11.	Danville Girl	Master Ma 1226		Woody Guthrie Vocals and guitar, Cisco Houston guitar and harmony vocals	2:45
12.	Guitar Blues	Master 675	April 20, 1944	Woody Guthrie guitar, Cisco Houston guitar	2:58
13.	Brown's Ferry Blues	Master Ma 98	April 25, 1944	Woody Guthrie Vocals and mandolin, Cisco Houston guitar and harmony vocals, Sonny Terry harmonica	2:48
14.	More Pretty Gals than One	Master LA-2	April 16, 1944	Woody Guthrie Vocals and mandolin, Cisco Houston guitar and harmony vocals	2:19
15.	Sonny's Flight	Master Ma 705		Woody Guthrie Vocals and mandolin, Cisco Houston guitar and harmony vocals	2:57
