= Stinson Records =

American record label

- Founded: 1939
- Founder: Herbert Harris; Irving Prosky
- Genre: folk and blues
- Country of origin: U.S.
- Location: New York City

Stinson Records was an American record label formed by Herbert Harris and Irving Prosky in 1939, initially to market, in the US, recordings made in the Soviet Union. Between the 1940s and 1960s, it mainly issued recordings of American folk and blues musicians, including Woody Guthrie and Josh White.

== History ==
According to most sources, the Stinson Trading Company was established in 1939 by Irving Prosky (1893-1952), a Russian-born distributor of Soviet records in the US, and Herbert Harris, the owner of the Union Record Shop in New York who was a member of the Communist Party and the proprietor of a movie house that screened Soviet films. Harris and Prosky operated the concession to sell records from the U.S.S.R. at the 1939 World's Fair in New York City, but when supplies fell short of demand he and Prosky set up their own record label to produce copies of Soviet and other eastern European recordings, including recordings by the Red Army Chorus. An earlier date for the company's foundation is indicated by a Billboard report in 1946 which stated that it was planning to expand "in connection with its 30th anniversary as a phonograph record manufacturer".

In 1943, Stinson established a financial partnership with the newly-established Asch Records, set up by Moe Asch. The arrangement enabled Asch to increase his supplies of shellac during World War II, while the Stinson company had an established distribution network and secured a share of the profits from Asch's recordings of such artists as Woody Guthrie. The two companies operated as one for a short time, producing records under the Asch-Stinson label, by Lead Belly, Josh White, Sonny Terry, Burl Ives, Richard Dyer-Bennet, Coleman Hawkins and Mary Lou Williams among others, before the arrangement ended in 1946. Asch then set up the Disc record label, a precursor of Folkways, while Harris - who took sole charge after Prosky retired through ill health- maintained control of the Stinson company. The two labels, Folkways and Stinson, then operated separately and to some degree in competition, although an arrangement seems to have been reached under which they shared out recordings by some of the artists they had recorded under their joint arrangement, most notably Woody Guthrie, with Asch's Folkways label issuing most of Guthrie's topical and political songs while the Stinson label issued most of his folk and country songs.

None of the musicians whose recordings had previously been released on the label continued to record for Stinson after the split with Asch, but Stinson retained the rights to some of the earlier recordings and released many of them in the new 12-inch LP record format. The Stinson label also continued to release new recordings by many major folk, blues and jazz musicians during the 1950s and early 1960s, including Pete Seeger, Ewan MacColl, Cisco Houston, Muggsy Spanier, The Duke of Iron, Carlos Montoya, Sidney Bechet, and Bob Gibson, as well as some recordings made under the agreement with Asch. Among the releases were an influential series of compilation albums in the American Folksay series.

From the early 1950s, the company was run by Herbert Harris' son Robert, and opened a second retail branch in Los Angeles. Herbert Harris died in 1956, and under the ownership of his widow, Sonia Harris, the company was run by his son-in-law, Jack Kall (1922-1989). Based in Los Angeles from the late 1950s, the company released many folk albums. It continued to issue recordings until the 1990s. A collection of master discs of Woody Guthrie recordings from the mid-1940s, originally held by Robert Harris' widow, was rediscovered in 2007, and reissued on CD as a box set, My Dusty Road.

In June 2019, Stinson was acquired by Smithsonian Folkways.
