= Wayne Walker (songwriter) =

American songwriter

Wayne Paul Walker (December 13, 1925 – January 2, 1979) was an American songwriter.

== Biography ==
Walker was born in Quapaw, Oklahoma. He wanted to become a country music performer but later found success as a songwriter in the 1950s and 1960s.

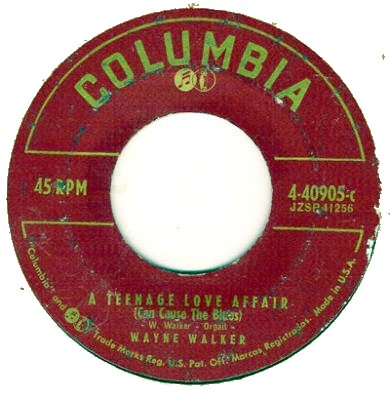
"A Teenage Love Affair"

Walker began his music career, influenced by his association with Webb Pierce and Tillman Franks. His first hit, "I've Got a New Heartache," was a country hit for Ray Price in 1956, later revived by Ricky Skaggs in 1986. His songwriting resulted in top 10 country singles in the 1950s and 1960s. "All the Time," written by him, topped the charts in 1967 in Jack Greene's rendition, receiving Billboard's Country Song of the Year award.

Some other country musicians who performed Walker's compositions include Kitty Wells and Ray Price. "Are You Sincere" broke beyond the country genre, reaching No. 3 on the 1958 Billboard pop chart with Andy Williams and earning Walker a BMI Million Play award.
