= The Smithsonian Folkways Collection =

Compilation album by Lead Belly
- Released: March 3, 2015
- Recorded: 1934–1948
- Genre: Folk; Blues
- Length: 5:04:43
- Label: Smithsonian Folkways

The Smithsonian Folkways Collection is a career-spanning box set of recordings by American folk and blues singer Lead Belly. It was released in 2015 by Smithsonian Folkways.

== Album ==
The box-set is a 5-CD collection featuring five hours of music, with 16 previously unreleased tracks, and a 140-page, large-format book. It covers a range of styles and themes including many topical songs about world events and cultural figures. Songs about fellow blues singer Blind Lemon Jefferson, a tribute to Hollywood actress Jean Harlow after her death and "Princess Elizabeth" about Elizabeth II, then a 21-year-old princess, in tribute to her wedding to Philip Mountbatten. Lead Belly documents the racial injustice of the Jim Crow South with the songs "Jim Crow Blues" and "The Bourgeois Blues". There are songs on the Scottsboro Boys, the Hindenburg disaster and "Hitler Song (Mr Hitler)" about Adolf Hitler. The compilation also includes songs directed towards the Governor of Texas Pat Morris Neff and Governor of Louisiana Oscar K. Allen where he is asking for a pardon from prison.

The box-set is intended to be "a museum exhibit in a coffee-table set” in order to give context to the history of the music. The 140-page book contains multiple essays, dozens of photographs, many previously unpublished and reproductions of session sheets, letters, newspaper clips and concert fliers.

== Critical reception ==
Professional ratings
Aggregate scores
Source	Rating
Metacritic	95/100
Review scores
Source	Rating
AllMusic	4.5/5 stars
The Daily Telegraph	5/5 stars
The Guardian	5/5 stars
Pitchfork	9/10

The Smithsonian Folkways Collection received unanimously positive reviews from critics. On the critical aggregator website Metacritic it has a score of 95 out of 100, based on reviews by eight critics, indicating "universal acclaim".

Writing for The Guardian, Robin Denselow gave it five out of five stars, calling it, "remarkable for its power, freshness and range." The Daily Telegraph rated it five out of five stars, writing "The range of the songs on this, the first career-spanning box set dedicated to the American music icon, is incredible." Stephen M. Deusner, of Pitchfork, called the album "as fine a retrospective as you can find for Lead Belly, showcasing the diversity of his repertoire and the precision of his playing and singing."

== Track listing ==
Disc 1
No.	Title	Length
1.	"Irene (Goodnight Irene)"	1:56
2.	"The Bourgeois Blues"	2:21
3.	"Fannin Street (Mister Tom Hughes Brown)"	3:34
4.	"The Midnight Special"	2:05
5.	"John Henry" (with Sonny Terry)	3:13
6.	"Black Girl (Where Did You Sleep Last Night)"	2:07
7.	"Pick a Bale of Cotton" (with the Oleander Quartet)	1:30
8.	"Take This Hammer"	2:15
9.	"Cotton Fields"	2:06
10.	"Old Riley / Here, Rattler, Here"	1:58
11.	"Rock Island Line"	2:02
12.	"The Gallis Pole (The Maid Freed from the Gallows)"	2:45
13.	"Ha-Ha This a Way"	1:34
14.	"Sukey Jump"	1:04
15.	"Boll Weevil"	3:07
16.	"Scottsboro Boys"	4:32
17.	"Governor O.K. Allen"	2:37
18.	"Governor Pat Neff"	3:40
19.	"There's a Man Going Around Taking Names"	1:24
20.	"On a Monday (Almost Done)" (with Sonny Terry)	1:47
21.	"You Can't Lose Me, Cholly"	2:37
22.	"Keep Your Hands Off Her"	2:51
23.	"We Shall Be Free" (with Woody Guthrie and Cisco Houston)	2:34

Disc 2
No.	Title	Length
1.	"Alabama Bound" (with Woody Guthrie and Cisco Houston)	2:17
2.	"Almost Day (Christmas Is a-Coming)"	1:05
3.	"Fiddler's Dram" (with Woody Guthrie and Cisco Houston)	2:28
4.	"Green Corn"	1:15
5.	"Sally Walker"	2:40
6.	"Bring Me a Little Water, Silvy"	0:48
7.	"Julie Ann Johnson"	0:41
8.	"Linin' Track"	1:11
9.	"Whoa, Back, Buck"	2:09
10.	"Shorty George"	1:28
11.	"Ham and Eggs (Make It on the Side of the Road)"	1:42
12.	"Moanin'"	1:00
13.	"Out on the Western Plains"	1:31
14.	"Noted Rider"	2:50
15.	"Meeting at the Building (All Over this World)"	0:59
16.	"Good, Good, Good (Talking, Preaching) / We Shall Walk Through the Valley"	2:11
17.	"Ain't You Glad (The Blood Done Signed My Name)"	2:19
18.	"I'm So Glad, I Done Got Over"	1:21
19.	"The Hindenburg Disaster"	3:22
20.	"Ella Speed"	5:48
21.	"Haul Away Joe"	2:48
22.	"Old Man"	2:35
23.	"Sweet Jenny Lee"	1:51
24.	"Jean Harlow"	1:51
25.	"Laura"	1:41
26.	"Queen Mary"	4:46

Disc 3
No.	Title	Length
1.	"Good Morning Blues" (with Sonny Terry)	2:23
2.	"Sail On, Little Girl (You Can't Mistreat Me)"	3:14
3.	"Easy Rider"	2:51
4.	"Poor Howard"	1:36
5.	"Duncan and Brady"	4:06
6.	"How Long, How Long" (with Sonny Terry)	2:13
7.	"T.B. Blues"	3:43
8.	"Jim Crow Blues"	3:30
9.	"Pigmeat"	2:33
10.	"John Hardy"	2:43
11.	"Outskirts of Town" (with Sonny Terry)	2:40
12.	"4, 5, and 9"	2:20
13.	"In the Evening (When the Sun Goes Down)"	3:29
14.	"Red Cross Store Blues"	3:09
15.	"Diggin' My Potatoes" (with Brownie McGhee)	2:34
16.	"Blind Lemon"	1:39
17.	"When a Man's a Long Way from Home"	2:57
18.	"Alberta"	3:11
19.	"Excerpt from "The Lonesome Train""	3:11
20.	"National Defense Blues"	3:13
21.	"Hitler Song (Mr. Hitler)"	4:31
22.	"Big Fat Woman"	1:10
23.	"Been So Long (Bellevue Hospital Blues)"	2:44

Disc 4
No.	Title	Length
1.	"WNYC- Folk Songs of America [Grey Goose; Boll Weevil; Yellow Gal; Ha-Ha This a Way; Leaving Blues; Irene (outro)]"	14:42
2.	"WNYC- Folk Songs of America [Almost Day; Blues in My Kitchen, Blues in My Dining Room; I Went Up on the Mountain; Good Morning Blues; Baby, Don't You Love Me No More; T.B. Blues; Irene (outro)]" (with the Oleander Quartet)	14:45
3.	"If It Wasn't for Dicky"	2:15
4.	"What's You Gonna Do When the World's on Fire" (with Anne Graham)	2:12
5.	"Rock Me (Hide Me in Thy Bosom)" (with Anne Graham)	2:19
6.	"Packin' Trunk Blues"	2:35
7.	"Leaving Blues"	2:58
8.	"How Come You Do Me Like You Do?"	3:26
9.	"One Dime Blues"	2:25
10.	"I'm Going to Buy You a Brand New Ford"	1:40
11.	"Jail-house Blues (It Was Early One Morning)"	1:13
12.	"Shout On (Honey, I'm All Out and Down)"	2:09
13.	"Come and Sit Down Beside Me"	1:02
14.	"Red River"	2:14

Disc 5
No.	Title	Length
1.	"Yes, I Was Standing in the Bottom / When It's Springtime in the Rockies"	1:41
2.	"Ain't Going Down to the Well No More (version 2)"	1:23
3.	"Everytime I Go Out"	1:25
4.	"Go Down, Old Hannah"	4:58
5.	"Black Betty"	1:53
6.	"Nobody Knows You When You're Down and Out" (with Bessie Smith)	3:42
7.	"Stewball" (with Martha Ledbetter)	2:34
8.	"Ain't It a Shame to Go Fishin' on a Sunday"	1:22
9.	"Relax Your Mind"	4:05
10.	"Princess Elizabeth"	3:33
11.	"Silver City Bound"	6:01
12.	"The Titanic"	5:11
13.	"House of the Rising Sun" (with Martha Ledbetter)	2:24
14.	"It's Tight Like That"	3:09
15.	"Diggin' My Potatoes"	3:57
16.	"Springtime in the Rockies"	3:02
17.	"Backwater Blues"	3:23
18.	"Didn't Old John Cross the Water"	1:56
19.	"De Kalb Blues (Ain't Gonna Drink No More)"	3:51
20.	"They Hung Him on the Cross (version 1)"	2:26
21.	"They Hung Him on the Cross (version 2)"	2:49
22.	"In the World"	2:02
