= Our Memories of Elvis Volume 2 =

Remix album by Elvis Presley
- Released: July 1979
- Genre: Popular, country
- Label: RCA Records
- Producer: Felton Jarvis; Joan Deary

Elvis Presley chronology
| Our Memories of Elvis (1979) | Our Memories of Elvis Volume 2 (1979) | Elvis Aron Presley (1980) |

Professional ratings
Review scores
| Source | Rating |
|---|---|
| AllMusic | 2/5 stars |

Our Memories of Elvis Volume 2 – More of the Pure Elvis Sound is an Elvis Presley album released by RCA Records (AQL1-3448) in July 1979. This was the second in the Our Memories series and wound up being the last following poor sales. Like the first volume, the album features ten tracks of 1970s Elvis songs with the overdubs removed. "I Got a Feelin' in My Body" was released as a single from the album and reached number six on the Billboard country singles chart. The album peaked at number 157 on the Billboard Top LPs chart on August 31, 1979, and number 12 on the Top Country Albums chart on September 12, 1979.

== Track listing ==
| No. | Title | Writer(s) | Length |
|---|---|---|---|
| 1. | "I Got a Feelin' in My Body" | Dennis Linde | 3:33 |
| 2. | "Green, Green Grass of Home" | Curly Putman | 3:33 |
| 3. | "For the Heart" | Dennis Linde | 3:27 |
| 4. | "She Wears My Ring" | Boudleaux Bryant; Felice Bryant | 3:20 |
| 5. | "I Can Help" | Billy Swan | 4:01 |
| 6. | "Way Down" | Layng Martine Jr. | 2:32 |
| 7. | "There's a Honky Tonk Angel (Who Will Take Me Back In)" | Denny Rice; Troy Seals | 3:02 |
| 8. | "Find Out What's Happening" | Jerry Crutchfield | 2:37 |
| 9. | "Thinking About You" | Tim Baty | 3:27 |
| 10. | "Don't Think Twice, It's All Right" | Bob Dylan | 8:36 |

== Charts ==
| Chart (1979) | Peak position |
|---|---|
| US Billboard 200 | 157 |
| US Top Country Albums (Billboard) | 12 |
