= Thornton Hagert =

American musician and musicologist (c. 1931–2017)

Thornton 'Tony' Hagert (about 1931 - 5 April 2017) was a musician and musicologist who founded the Vernacular Music Research archive. An album which he produced for the Smithsonian Institution was nominated for two Grammy Awards.

== Early life and education ==
Hagert was born in Philadelphia, the second of three children of Henry Hagert, a designer and artist, and his wife Eleanor Fischer, a model and graphic designer. His great-grandfather, Henry Schell Hagert, was a poet and district attorney in Philadelphia, and his grandfather was an artist. Hagert attended Friends Select School and Episcopal Academy, and graduated from Central High School in 1947. He studied music at the Curtis Institute of Music in Philadelphia and the Pius X School of Liturgical Music in New York. He began studying at the University of Pennsylvania, but was drafted into the army during the Korean War. After leaving the army, he graduated from George Washington University with a business degree, and then worked for the US Department of Agriculture in the Rural Electrification Authority and loans department.

== Music and musicology ==
Hagert played in jazz bands on weekends in the Washington area. He also produced and wrote liner notes for albums of historical music, including Classic Rags and Ragtime Songs (Smithsonian Collection, 1975) and. He worked for the Rockefeller Foundation on the Recorded Anthology of American Music released for the United States Bicentennial in 1976, writing in the notes to the album Come And Trip It (Instrumental Dance Music 1780s-1920s that one piece was "intended to be played by genteel young ladies. It has a useless introduction, exasperating interludes, and a pretentious irrelevant ending." He was employed by the Smithsonian Institution to produce the album An Experiment in Modern Music: Paul Whiteman at Aeolian Hall, for which he sourced recordings by artists including George Gershwin, Paul Whiteman, Zez Confrey and the Original Dixieland Jazz Band. His ten pages of notes were described as "a major statement ... provid[ing] copious information about Whiteman and the concert itself and [] an in-depth look at each piece performed that evening." In 1983, that album was nominated for the Grammy Award for Best Album Notes and the Grammy Award for Best Historical Album.

He also founded Vernacular Music Research, an archival and historical collection of music. It includes print (books, sheet music, orchestrations), 78' records, and other media featuring American music and dance from the early 19th century to the 1960s. The Archive consists of about 125,000 items of printed music, 75,000 items of recorded music, 5,500 books and 2,000 periodicals on New World Vernacular music, dance, and related topics.
