= Canadian Birkebeiner =

Cross-country ski event in Western Canada

- Status: active
- Genre: sporting event
- Date: Second Saturday in February
- Frequency: annual
- Locations: Ukrainian Cultural Heritage Village - Cooking Lake–Blackfoot Provincial Recreation Area, Alberta
- Country: Canada
- Inaugurated: 1985
- Major events: Cross-country skiing
- People: Volunteering, Nonprofit organization
- Member: Nordiq Canada

The Canadian Birkebeiner is the largest classic style cross-country ski event in Western Canada. Founded in 1985, it is one of three Birkebeiner Loppets held worldwide, the others being the Norwegian Birkebeinerrennet and the American Birkebeiner. The event is organized annually on the second Saturday of February by approximately 500 volunteers of the Canadian Birkebeiner Society. About 1000 skiers take part in the one-day event, which includes races from 2 km to 55 km. The three main races are the 55 km with 5.5 kg backpack, the 55 km light and the 31 km from Ukrainian Cultural Heritage Village, via Elk Island National Park and finishing at Washkahegan Staging Area in Cooking Lake–Blackfoot Provincial Recreation Area, Alberta. The Canadian Birkebeiner is organized in the UNESCO-designated Beaver Hills Biosphere.

== Origin ==
The Canadian Birkebeiner is named after the Norwegian Birkebeinerrennet, which commemorates an important historical event. In 1206 a group of Birkebeiner loyalists, who fought for Sverre Sigurdsson and his descendants in the Norwegian civil war, smuggled Haakon IV, the widely regarded illegitimate son of Norway's King Håkon Sverresson, from Lillehammer to safety in Trondheim. As in the Norwegian Birkebeinerrennet, the skiers in the Canadian Birkebeiner carry a pack symbolizing the weight of an 18-month-old child.

== History ==
On February 9, 1985, the first Birkebeiner race was organized by the Canadian Birkebeiner Society. In total 127 skiers participated in the cross-country marathon starting in Devon and finishing at Fort Edmonton Park. The Canadian Birkebeiner continued to be held in this area until 1990, when, because of recurring issues with the level of snow on the Devon–Fort Edmonton Park trail, the event moved permanently to Cooking Lake–Blackfoot Provincial Recreation Area.

In 1996 a study of heart rates of cross-country skiers was conducted during the race, and the results reported in the Journal of Human Movement Studies.

In 1999 about 2500 people took part in the race; in 2018 the event attracted about 1000 skiers.

While the race is organized every year, it has occasionally been cancelled because of inappropriate conditions; in 2016 there was not enough snow, and in 2019 the temperature was below −25 °C.

During the COVID-19 pandemic in 2021 the Canadian Birkebeiner Society organized their first Virtual Canadian Birkie, which attracted over 1100 participants. The traditional Canadian Birkie was cancelled due to the COVID-19 restrictions in 2021.

== Haakon Haakonson Award ==
Since 1990 skiers that have completed all three international Birkebeiner long distance cross-country ski races – Birkebeinerrennet in Norway, the American Birkebeiner and the Canadian Birkebeiner – receive the Haakon Haakonson Award. The award is an initiative of the Canadian Birkebeiner Society to recognise the skier's dedication to the Birkebeiner races. In 2019 a total of 175 skiers received the award.
