= Robin Cockett =

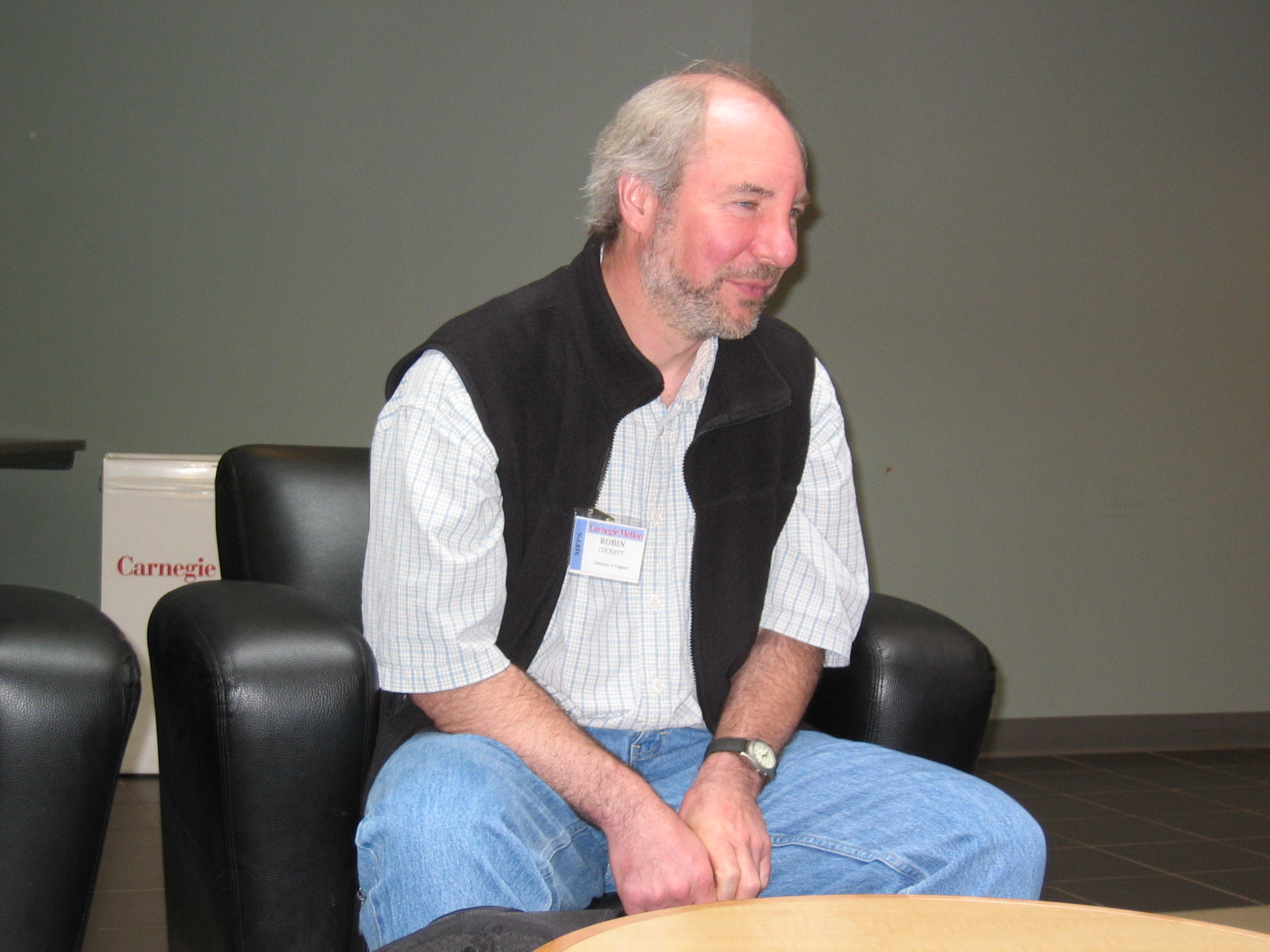
- Cockett in 2004
- Born: May 4, 1952 (age 74); Surrey, United Kingdom
- Education: University of Warwick (BSc, 1974); University of Leeds (PhD, 1979)
- Spouse: Polly Lee Knowlton Cockett (m. 1984)
- Children: Grayson; Rowan; Audrey Lane
- Scientific career
- Fields: Category theory Quantum programming
- Workplaces: University of Calgary; University of Tennessee
- Thesis: Injectives and Localizations in Category Theory (1979)
- Doctoral advisor: Alfred Goldie

James Robin Bernard Cockett (born May 4, 1952) is a British computer scientist and professor at the University of Calgary.

== Education ==
Cockett received his Bachelor of Science from the University of Warwick in 1974, and earned his PhD from the University of Leeds in 1979 for his research in injectives and localizations in category theory, studying under Alfred Goldie.

== Career and research ==
Cockett has been a professor of computer science at the University of Calgary since 1991, previously holding the title of professor at the University of Tennessee.

Cockett works primarily in the fields of category theory, categorical programming, and quantum programming. Cockett is a member of the organizing committee for the Foundational Methods in Computer Science (FMCS) conference, an annual workshop for researchers in theoretical computer science and category theory supported by the Pacific Institute for the Mathematical Sciences (PIMS).

=== Selected publications ===
His most cited publications include:

- Weakly distributive categories
- Restriction categories I: categories of partial maps
- Differential categories
- Cartesian differential categories
- Differential structure, tangent structure, and SDG

== Personal life ==
Cockett has been married to fellow University of Calgary professor Polly Knowlton Cockett since 1984, they have three children together: Audrey Lane, Rowan, and Grayson. Cockett is an avid cross-country skier, taking part in the Canadian Birkebeiner on more than one occasion, as well as volunteering as an instructor.

Cockett and his wife have volunteered for numerous environmentally-focused initiatives, including as lecturers for the Calgary Parks Biodiversity Conservation program at Nose Hill Park, and with the Alberta Wilderness Association, where his family's work earned them an award from the city of Calgary.
