= Joseph Oleskiw =

Promoter of Ukrainian emigration to Canada

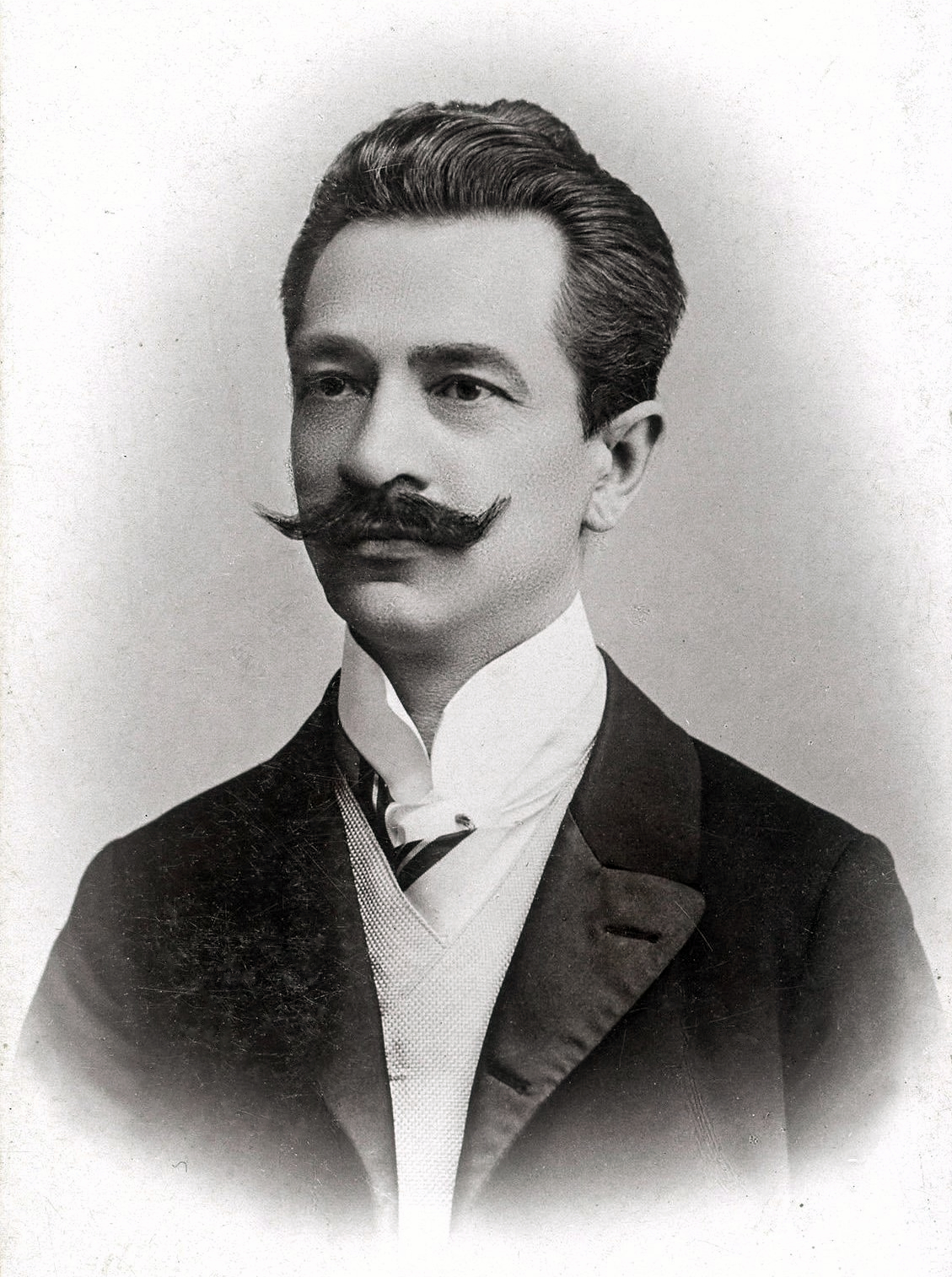
- Joseph Oleskiw (1860–1903)
- Born: September 28, 1860
- Died: October 18, 1903 (aged 43)
- Education: University of Lemberg (now Lviv University)
- Occupations: Professor of Agronomy, Teacher's College in Lemberg.
- Known for: Promoting Ukrainian emigration from Austrian Galicia to the Canadian Prairies
- Notable work: "On Free Lands" (1895) "On Emigration" (December 1895)

Dr. Joseph Oleskiw or Jósef Olesków (Note: Ukrainian: Іосифъ Олеськôвъ (historic spelling), Осип Олеськів, Йосип Олеськів (modern spelling), Osyp Oleskiv) (September 28, 1860 – October 18, 1903) was a Ukrainian professor of agronomy who promoted Ukrainian immigration to the Canadian prairies. His efforts helped encourage the initial wave of settlers which began the Ukrainian Canadian community.

== Ukraine ==
Joseph Oleskiw was born in the village of Nova Skvariava (Nowa Skwarzawa), near Zhovkva, in the Austro-Hungarian province of Galicia (now western Ukraine). His father, a Greek (Eastern) Catholic parish priest, was a member of the rural élite. Oleskiw studied geography and agriculture at the University of Lemberg (Lviv, Ukraine). He was appointed professor of agronomy at the teacher's college in Lemberg.

== Early immigration ==
Ukrainian immigrants who had travelled to Brazil and Argentina, enticed by the free transportation they had received, sent back word that conditions there were worse than in their homeland. After hearing of the struggles of Ukrainian immigrants in Brazil, Oleskiw investigated alternative choices. He determined that the Canadian prairies were the most suitable for the Ukrainian farmers. This led to Oleskiw writing two pamphlets in Ukrainian – "On Free Lands" (Pro Vilni Zemli, spring 1895), and "On Emigration" (O emigratsiy, December 1895) – and one in Polish. Oleskiw sought and obtained the endorsement of the Prosvita Society that a non-commercial, non-profit effort to help the immigrants should be implemented.

== The journey ==
Oleskiw left for Canada along with Ivan Dorundiak, a representative of the farming community, on July 25, 1895 on a fact-finding journey that would span three months. Along the way, at length he met with Sir Charles Tupper, at that time Canada's High Commissioner in London. The correspondence between Oleskiw and the Canadian Government was conducted with the aid of the London embassy. Because of Oleskiw's efforts, on the one hand, and the Canadian government's direct involvement, on the other, the flow of Ukrainians to Canada was much more targeted and organized than that to the United States.

== Canada ==
On August 12, 1895, they arrived in Montreal. On reaching Winnipeg, Oleskiw met with H.H. Smith, Commissioner of Dominion Lands under the Dominion Lands Act, who assigned Hugo Carstens, who spoke German, to act as an interpreter and guide for Oleskiw and Dorundiak's tour of Western Canada. Oleskiw was particularly interested in the area of Stony Plain, District of Alberta, due west of Edmonton, where a number of German settlements had been started. In the region of Beaverhill Creek, northeast of Edmonton, he encountered 16 Ukrainian families who had recently taken up homesteads. Following an inspection of Vancouver Island, he returned to Winnipeg and then travelled to Ottawa via the United States.

== Immigration to Canada begins ==
Oleskiw believed in selective emigration. His first group of settlers were thirty hand-picked families, led by his brother Vladymir (Volodymyr), who arrived in Canada in Quebec City on April 30, 1896. The majority of these immigrants settled in Edna, District of Alberta, northeast of Edmonton.

Later that summer, seventeen Oleskiw families led by Cyril Genik, and nine who had left on their own from Bukovina, also settled in Manitoba in the Stuartburn district. The first representatives of the intelligentsia – Cyril (Kyrylo) Genik, Ivan Bodrug, and Ivan Negrich – guided contingents of Dr. Oleskiw's settlers to Canada in 1896 and 1897. Genik preferred Stuartburn, a district not recommended by Oleskiw; as it was close to the large Mennonite settlement near Gretna, and commercial farms in North Dakota and Minnesota, where those Ukrainians who needed cash might earn some extra money. Fifteen families from Galicia settled in an area recommended by Oleskiw, 5 miles (8.0 km) northwest of Dauphin, Manitoba. As the Riding Mountains resembled the Carpathian foothills, some families also found their way into this area.

Thus began the massive, continuous influx of Ukrainian immigration to Canada. Due in part to the widespread distribution of Oleskiw's literature, Ukrainians became the largest Slavic group in Canada, with a population of at least 170,000 by August 1914. Although Oleskiw promoted emigrants based on their assimilationist tendencies, the mass of Ukrainians that followed them tended to retain their cultural heritage.

== Later life ==
Oleskiw was married twice and had two sons and two daughters from his first marriage. In 1900 Olesków was appointed principal of a teacher's college in Sokal. The departure from Lemberg, political pressure and the death of his first wife led him to withdraw from emigration promotion after his move. Three years after the appointment to Sokal, he died suddenly at the age of 43.

== Legacy ==
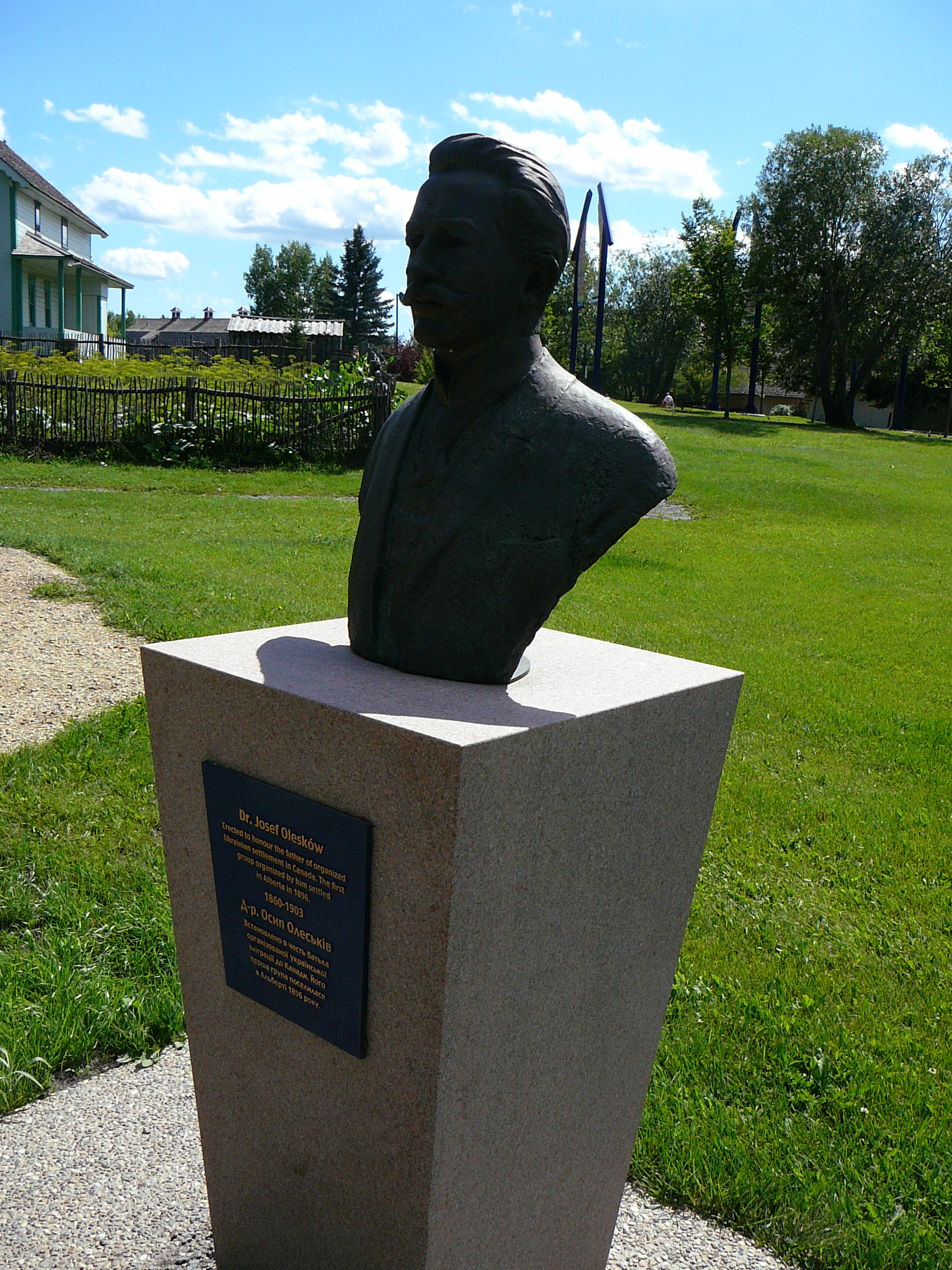
Bust of Joseph Oleskiw at the Ukrainian Cultural Heritage Village in Alberta, Canada

Oleskiw's accomplishments in organizing Ukrainian immigration to Canada were threefold. First, he diverted to Canada thousands of Ukrainians destined for Brazil. Second, in attempting to regulate the number of peasants leaving Western Ukraine in any given year, he tried to prevent Galician land prices from falling drastically; though in this he was only partially successful. Third, in organizing the immigrants’ journey, he sought not only to prevent exploitation by unscrupulous officials and ticket agents but to secure the Canadian government's co-operation in the early stages of immigration.

Today, Oleskiw Park and the Oleskiw neighbourhood in Edmonton, Alberta are named after him.

== See also ==
- Iwan Pylypow
- Cyril Genik
- Block settlement
- Ukrainian Canadians
- Clifford Sifton
- Ukrainian Cultural Heritage Village
- List of Canadian place names of Ukrainian origin

== Bibliography ==
- Martynowych, Orest T. (1991). Ukrainians in Canada: The Formative Period, 1891-1924. Edmonton: Canadian Institute of Ukrainian Studies Press, University of Alberta.
- Marunchak, Michael, H. (1970). The Ukrainian Canadians: A History. Winnipeg: Ottawa: Ukrainian Free Academy of Sciences.
- Gerus, Oleh W. "Nestor Dmytriw", Dictionary of Canadian Biography.
- Subtelny, Orest. Ukrainians In North America, An Illustrated History, University of Toronto Press, Toronto, 1991.
- MacGregor, J.G. (1969). Vilni Zemli (Free Lands) : The Ukrainian Settlement of Alberta. Toronto: McClelland & Stewart Ltd.
- Isajiw, Wsevolod; Makuch, Andrij (1994). "Ukrainians in Canada". In Ann Lencyk Pawliczko (ed.). Ukraine and Ukrainians Throughout the World. Toronto: University of Toronto Press. p. 333. ISBN 0-8020-0595-0.
- Swyripa, Frances A. (1985). "Ukrainians". In Mel Hurtig (ed.). The Canadian Encyclopedia. Vol. 3 (1st ed.). Edmonton, Alberta: Hurtig Publishers. p. 1862. ISBN 0-88830-272-X.
