= Kalyna Country =

- Location: East Central Alberta, Canada (Sturgeon County, Thorhild County, Smoky Lake County, County of St. Paul No. 19, County of Vermilion River, County of Two Hills No. 21, County of Minburn No. 27, Beaver County, Lamont County, and Strathcona County)
- Type: ecomuseum
- Website: www.kalynacountry.com

The Kalyna Country ecomuseum is a heritage and eco-tourism district in East Central Alberta, Canada, named after the highbush cranberry plant, pronounced /kɐ'ɫɪ.nɐ/ in the Ukrainian language. The Ukrainian folklore states: "Without Kalyna, there is no Ukraina".

== Location and promotion ==
Kalyna Country bills itself as the "World's Largest Ecomuseum" at 20,000 square kilometers, or more than three times the size of Prince Edward Island. Its boundaries stretch across a broad area of Alberta east and north of Edmonton, including nearly all the areas traditionally considered part of Canada's first Ukrainian Block Settlement, the Edna-Star colony. The area has been described as being to Ukrainian Canadians what Cajun Country is to Cajun culture. At its peak, the area was the largest settlement of Ukrainians in the world outside Eastern Europe.

Officially, Kalyna Country comprises Sturgeon County, Thorhild County, Smoky Lake County, the County of St. Paul No. 19, the County of Vermilion River, the County of Two Hills No. 21, the County of Minburn No. 27, Beaver County, Lamont County, and Strathcona County and many of the neighbouring urban municipalities, Indian reserves and Metis settlements.

Kalyna berries were a popular source of food amongst the early pioneers, fur traders and natives. Kalyna Country is a year-round playground with culture as diverse as the landscape that offers it. Here the Aspen Parkland and the Boreal Forest converge, split by the scenic North Saskatchewan River Valley, all amidst thousands of hectares of prime agricultural land.

The main attractions include:

- Elk Island National Park known for its work with Bison conservation.
- North America's Church Capital - Lamont County claims this title, with nearly 40 churches declared historic sites, despite the small and thinly spread population. Tours are available.
- Alberta's oldest remaining Pool Hall, in the Village of Vilna. This attraction still boasts its pool and billiards tables, as well as a barber shop and some food service.
- Ukrainian Cultural Heritage Village - a living history open-air museum showcasing East-Central Alberta's unique culture from 1892 to 1930.
- Vegreville Ukrainian Pysanka Festival - a huge Ukrainian cultural festival held every year in Vegreville and named after that town's giant model of a Ukrainian easter egg or pysanka.
- Great White North Pumpkin Fair and Weigh-Off - the first Saturday of October in the town of Smoky Lake. This is part of the Great Pumpkin Commonwealth, and searches for the largest pumpkin in North America each year.
- Fort Victoria - a former fur-trading post, and missionary centre, home to the oldest building in Alberta.
- Metis Crossing - A celebration of Metis culture in Alberta and home to Alberta's first Zip-Line attraction. Located 2 km from Fort Victoria.

== Giants of the Prairies ==
The area is also famous for the Giants of the Prairies, a series of roadside attractions (usually Ukrainian-themed).

- World's Largest Mushrooms, Vilna
- World's Largest 'Pumpkin Patch', Smoky Lake
- World's Largest Perogy (Ukrainian dumpling), Glendon
- World's Largest Kubasa (Ukrainian garlic sausage), Mundare
- World's Largest Pysanka (Ukrainian easter egg), Vegreville
- World's Largest UFO Landing Pad, St. Paul
- World's Largest Duck, Andrew

== Affiliations ==
The museum is affiliated with: CMA, CHIN, and Virtual Museum of Canada.

== See also ==
- Ukrainian Cultural Heritage Village
- Open-air museum
- List of Canadian place names of Ukrainian origin
