= Iwan Pylypow =

Ukrainian pioneer in Canada (1859–1936)

- Born: September 28, 1859; Nebyliv, povit Kalush, Austrian Galicia
- Died: October 10, 1936 (aged 77); Alberta, Canada
- Occupation: Farmer
- Known for: Ukrainian pioneer

Iwan Pylypiw or Ivan Pylypow (Ukrainian: Іван Пилипiв, September 28, 1859 – October 10, 1936) was one of the first Ukrainian immigrants to Canada in 1891–93, along with Wasyl Eleniak.

Pylypow was born in the village of Nebyliv in Kalush county (povit) in Austrian Galicia (today Kalush Raion, Ivano-Frankivsk Oblast). He was a peasant logging contractor, and after falling on hard times considered finding a better life abroad, like many other Galicians of the time. Pylypiv had heard about free lands in Canada from German neighbours, and after corresponding with former classmate Johan Krebs, who had initially settled near Medicine Hat, North-West Territories, he set off for Canada with his friends Eleniak and Tyt Ziniak in the fall of 1891.

Ziniak was turned back at the Austrian–German border, but Pylypiv and Eleniak traveled via Halifax, Nova Scotia to Winnipeg, Manitoba, where they met several ethnic German loggers who had worked for Pylypow. They visited the loggers' homesteads near Langenburg, North-West Territories, and went as far west as Calgary. Unimpressed with the land near the railway, they went back to Manitoba, where a visit to a Mennonite settlement at Gretna convinced Pylypiv that Canada was a viable destination. Eleniak, out of money, stayed to work for the winter, while Pylypow returned to Galicia for their families before settling in Canada permanently.

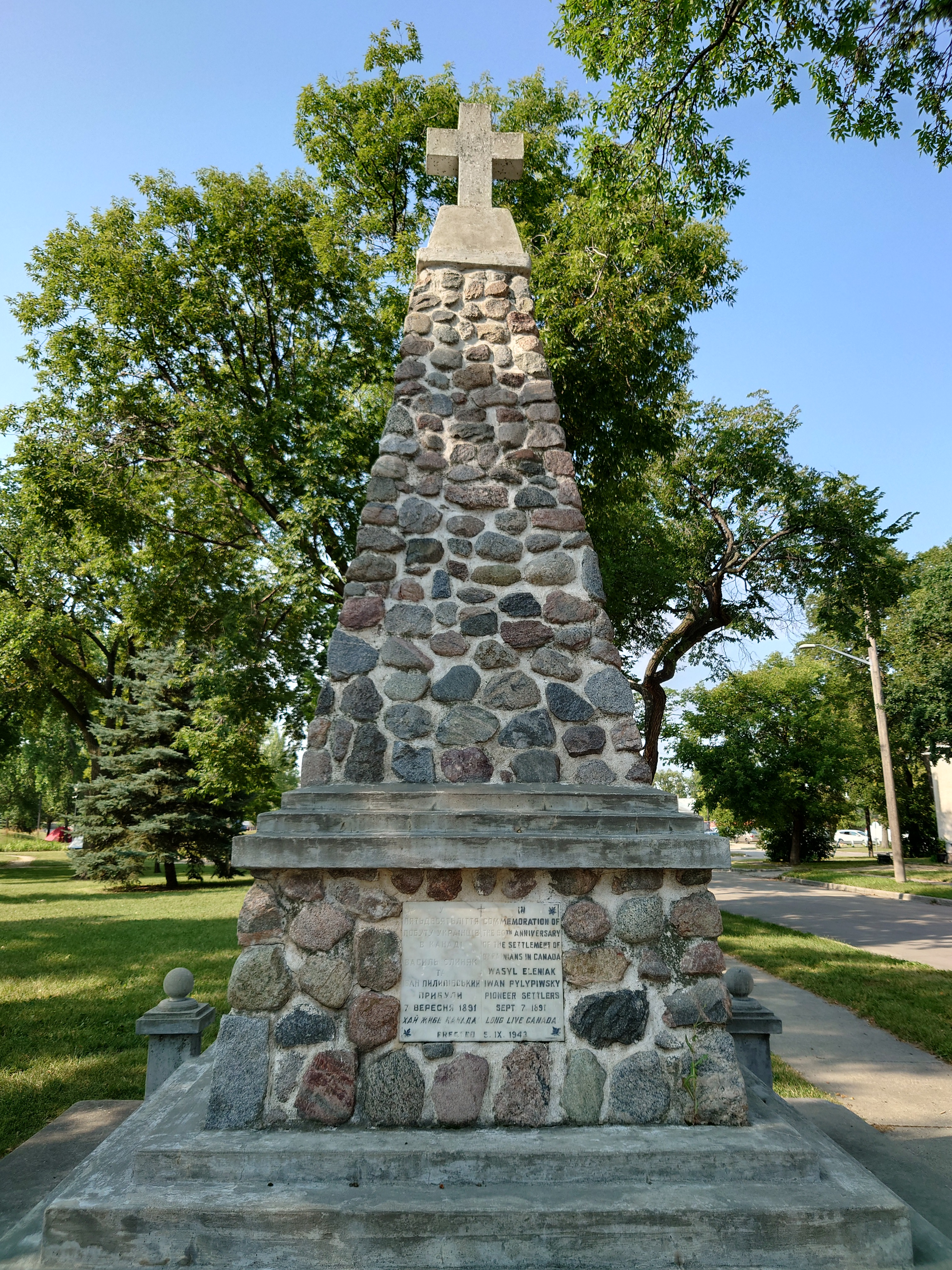
Monument to Wasyl Eleniak and Ivan Pylypiw (Pylypiwsky) in Winnipeg

When he arrived back in Austria-Hungary his account of vast, unsettled lands prompted both excitement and skepticism. When some learned that Pylypiv expected to receive a commission from a Hamburg steamship company and accused him of swindling, he was arrested for sedition, soliciting emigration, and fraud. After awaiting trial for three months in jail, on May 12, 1892, he was sentenced to another month. Although Pylypow's efforts at promotion were doused, his arrest and trial had generated publicity, and seven families led by Anton Paish and Mykola Tychkovsky set off for the Canadian Prairies. A few stopped to work briefly with Eleniak in Gretna, and then continued on to meet the rest in the District of Alberta. With the help of Krebs, the families found homesteads 12 miles (19 km) east of the Galician German settlement of Josephburg, northeast of Edmonton.

Pylypiv and his family finally caught up with the group in 1893, settling at Edna-Star, then in the District of Alberta, east of Fort Saskatchewan, where he farmed and became very active in the co-operative movement. He died a wealthy man in 1936 at the age of 77 years.

The last farmhouse he lived in, the third one he built in the Edna-Star area, is now a part of the Ukrainian Cultural Heritage Village, located east of Edmonton, Alberta. The "Pylypow Industrial" subdivision of Edmonton is named after him.

== See also ==
- Ukrainian Canadians
- Joseph Oleskiw, another early promoter of Ukrainian emigration to Canada
