= Miquelon Lake =

Lake in Alberta, Canada

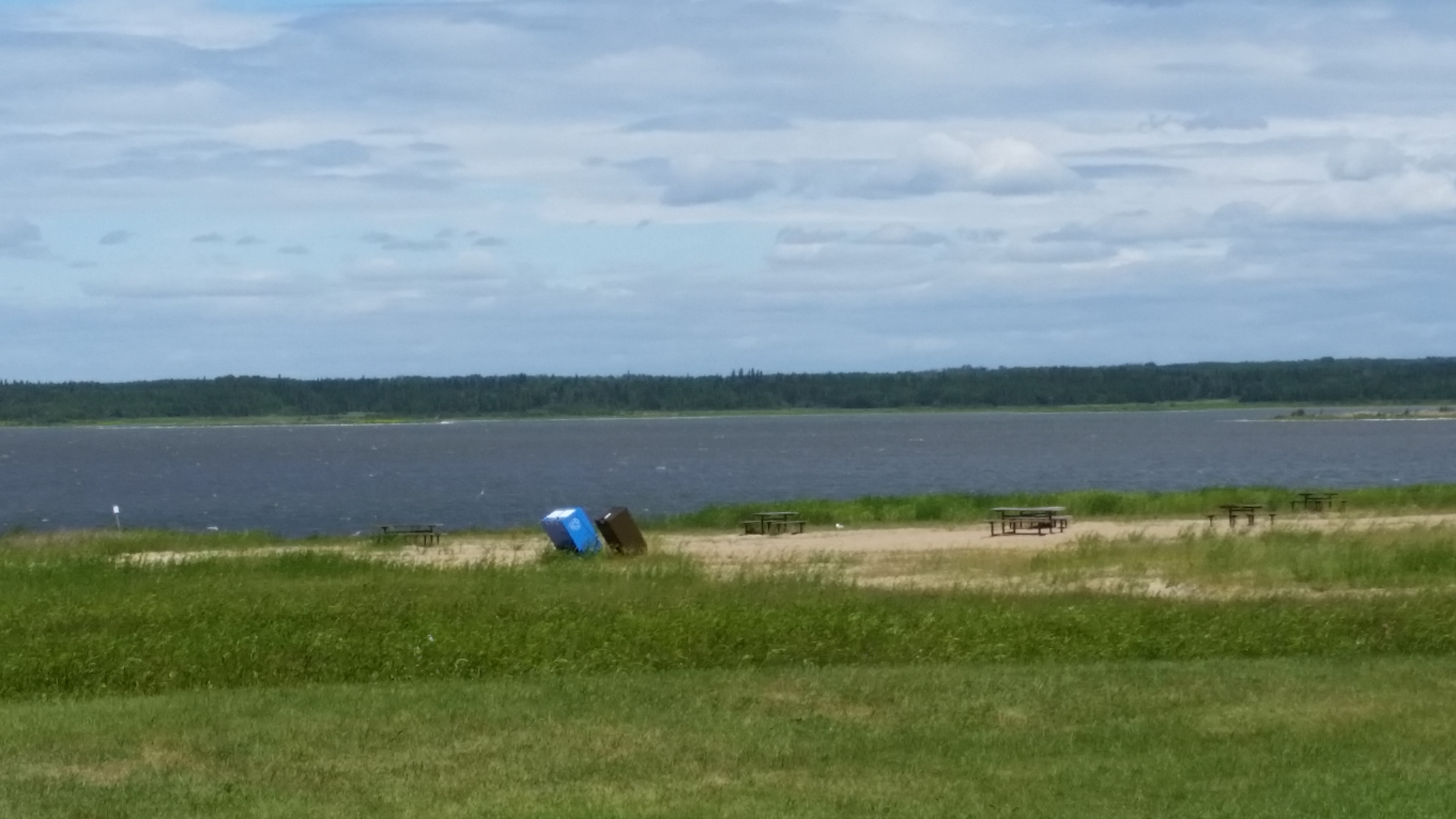
- Miquelon Lake Provincial Park

- Location within Alberta
- Location: Camrose County, Alberta
- Coordinates: 53°14′33″N 112°53′51″W
- Type: saline
- Basin countries: Canada
- Max. length: 3.2 km (2.0 mi)
- Max. width: 4.6 km (2.9 mi)
- Surface area: 8.72 km^{2} (3.37 sq mi)
- Average depth: 2.7 m (8 ft 10 in)
- Max. depth: 6 m (20 ft)
- Surface elevation: 768 m (2,520 ft)
- References: Miquelon Lake

Miquelon Lake (/ˈmɪkəlɒn/) is a saline lake in Alberta, Canada, in the heart of Miquelon Lake Provincial Park. The lake is no longer accessible for recreation as its water levels have dropped drastically since the 1920s. The lake is relatively shallow, only allowing for paddle boats such as canoes or kayaks. High salinity levels stunt the growth of algae and are responsible for the loss of fish life and the white residue found along the shoreline.

== History ==
Miquelon Lake was part of a larger lake in the past that was drained down into three distinct basins, now called the Miquelon Lakes. The largest of these basins is Miquelon Lake. In 1920, the area was designated as a bird sanctuary. On May 20, 1958, the provincial park around the three basins, Miquelon Lake Provincial Park, was established.
