= Edna-Star colony =

Ukrainian block settlement in Alberta, Canada

Location of Edna-Star colony Alberta

The Edna-Star colony, also called the Nebyliv colony, or the Ukrainian block settlement is the largest and oldest of the Ukrainian Canadian block settlements. Located east of Edmonton, in east-central Alberta, the boundaries of the block settlement include all or part of multiple municipal districts, within census divisions numbers 12 and 10.

== Background ==
A block settlement is a type of rural ethnic enclave found throughout Western Canada. The founding of this block settlement in 1891 marked the beginning of large-scale Ukrainian immigration to Canada. The region has been described at being as important to Ukrainian Canadian culture as Acadiana is to the Cajuns of Louisiana.

== Founding and development ==
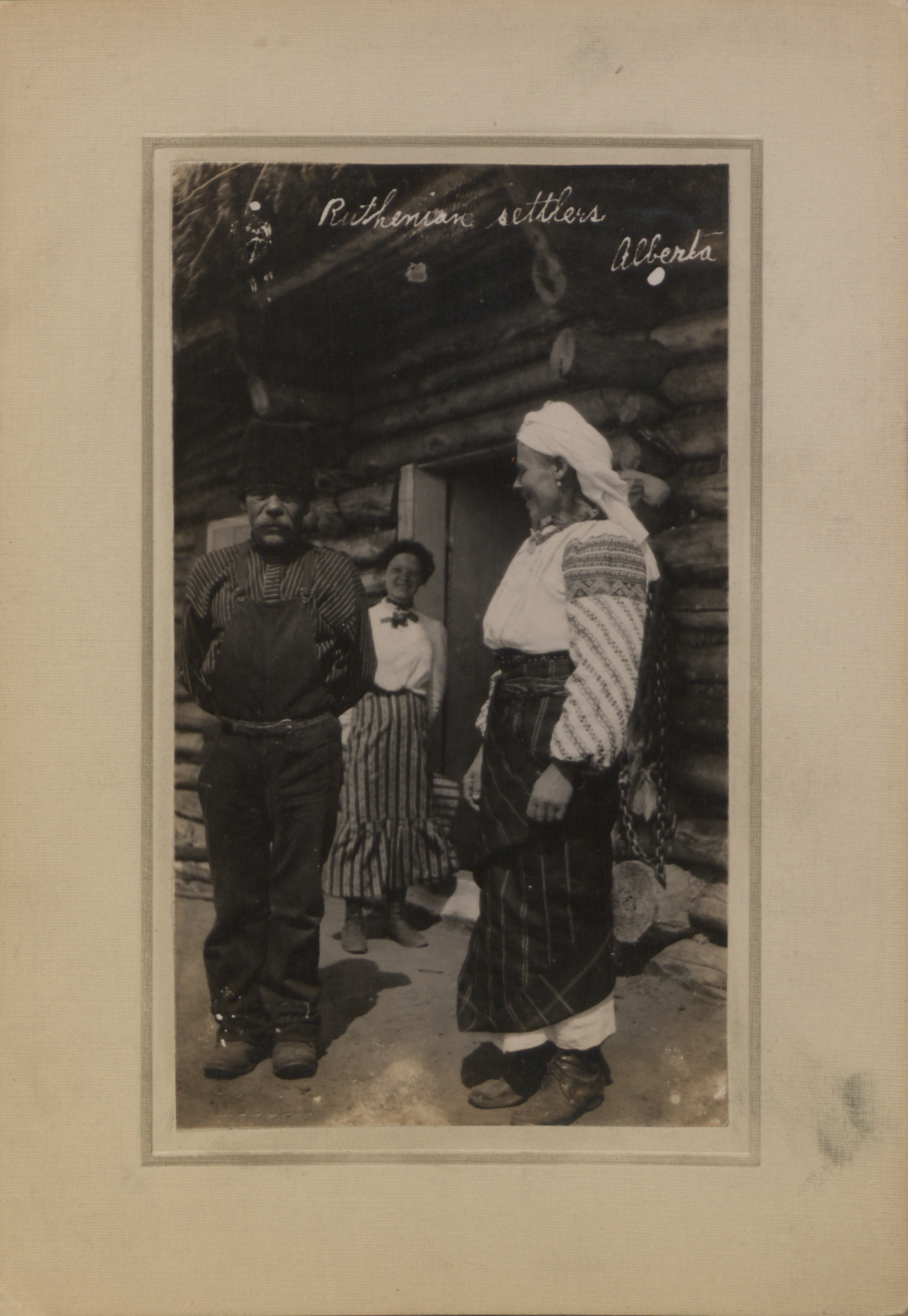
A 1911 photograph of "Ruthenian [Ukrainian] settlers in Alberta". The older couple in front are (partly) in national costume. The man sports a "Cossack moustache" and is wearing a kuchma (fur cap), the woman a poias (sash) over a sorochka vyshyvanka (embroidered blouse) and a home-woven skirt. The khata (cottage) is made in the vernacular style of notched logs and has a thatched roof.

Native of Nebyliv (near Kalush) Wasyl Eleniak, while employed in the lumbering industry driving rafts down Limnytsia, heard tales from some local German colonists (West Ukraine was part of Austria-Hungary as the Kingdom of Galicia and Lodomeria) whose relatives in Canada "received 160 acres for nothing". The Eleniak's parents owned only 3 morgens of land and decided to check the rumors and emigrate to Canada.

The colony was founded by a group of Ukrainian settlers led by Iwan Pylypow in 1891 (although he himself did not settle permanently until the next year). Pylypow's first farm was near the present-day village of Star, Alberta, then called Edna, and the name Edna-Star was applied to the whole area retrospectively. Most of the first settlers were from Pylypow's home village of Nebyliv and the area was sometimes called the Nebyliv colony in their honour, although later settlers were from other areas of Austrian-controlled Ukraine, namely the provinces of Galicia and Bukovina.

The location of the new settlement was chosen partly because of the existing Galician German settlement nearby at Josephburg. Ukrainians in Galicia were used to working with their German neighbours in the "Old Country" and many could speak some German. For new settlers, having a place to earn cash wages until their farm became productive was also extremely important, and the Germans were the logical place to turn. Another prime concern of the settlers was timber. This part of Alberta is part of the aspen parkland biome, a relatively heavily wooded area compared to the prairies further to the south. To the surprise (and sometimes consternation) of Canadian authorities, the Ukrainians were willing to sacrifice time and effort to clear the land, and would even take lands of poor soil quality in order to secure treed land. This was because there was a severe wood shortage in Austrian Ukraine, and peasants became reliant on the pan (landlord) for the precious commodity, used in making all manner of tools and buildings. In Canada one could receive 160 acres (65 ha) of forested (or prairie) land for free under the Dominion Lands Act.

By 1914 the zone of Ukrainian settlement stretched for 110 kilometres (68 mi) from Edna-Star in the west to Slawa in the east and approximately 70 kilometres (43 mi) from Smoky Lake in the north to the outskirts of Mundare and Vegreville in the south.

Many of the non-Ukrainian immigrants to the area, also came from the Austrian crownlands of Galicia and Bukovina where the Ukrainians originated. These included Poles, Romanians, Germans, and Jews.

== Recent demographics ==
Today the area known as the Kalyna Country ecomuseum, which preserves and showcases Ukrainian Canadian culture. It is also home to the Ukrainian Cultural Heritage Village which contains pioneer buildings from all across the area.

At one time within the boundaries of the settlement block, up to 80% of the population was of Ukrainian origin. However, internal migration within Canada has changed the patterns. As well, since Statistics Canada has allowed people to claim "Canadian" as an ethnic origin only since 2001, figures are not comparable before and after that date.

According to the 2006 Census, in Alberta census division 10 there were 6,700 people who claimed to be single-origin Ukrainian (the largest of any ethnic group, excluding "Canadian") and 17,130 people who claimed some Ukrainian origin out of a total population of 85,155, giving approximately 20% of the population. In Division 12 there were 3,575 who claimed to be Ukrainian single-origin and 11,220 total claiming some Ukrainian origin out of 59,305, for around 19% of the population.

Ethnic origin statistics are not available for many of the municipalities with the most concentrated Ukrainian populations, because Statistics Canada does not publish this information for communities with a total population of less than 5,000 for privacy reasons. Rural-to-urban migration has reduced the populations of Lamont County, Thorhild County, the County of Two Hills No. 21, and the County of Minburn No. 27 below this threshold. The counties for which there are statistics that have the highest proportions of total respondents claiming some Ukrainian origin are the County of St. Paul No. 19 (26%), Sturgeon County (18%), Beaver County (16%), the Municipal District of Bonnyville No. 87 (17%), and the County of Vermilion River (16%).

Other than Ukrainians, the largest responses in this area are French (especially near Bonnyville and St. Paul), German (especially near Josephburg), Native Indian, and Metis, with smaller number of English, Scottish, and Irish, and some Romanian, Polish, Russian, Jewish, and Norwegian.

In the three largest towns in the region the percentage of the population claiming some Ukrainian origin were: Vegreville 44%, (5,720) St. Paul, 31%, and Bonnyville, 18%. Other towns and villages thought to have large Ukrainian populations include Myrnam, Willingdon, Lamont, Mundare, Andrew, Chipman, plus numerous hamlets and rural communities.
