= Ukrainian Cultural Heritage Village =

Open-air museum in Alberta, Canada

Coordinates: 53°34′7″N 112°47′56″W

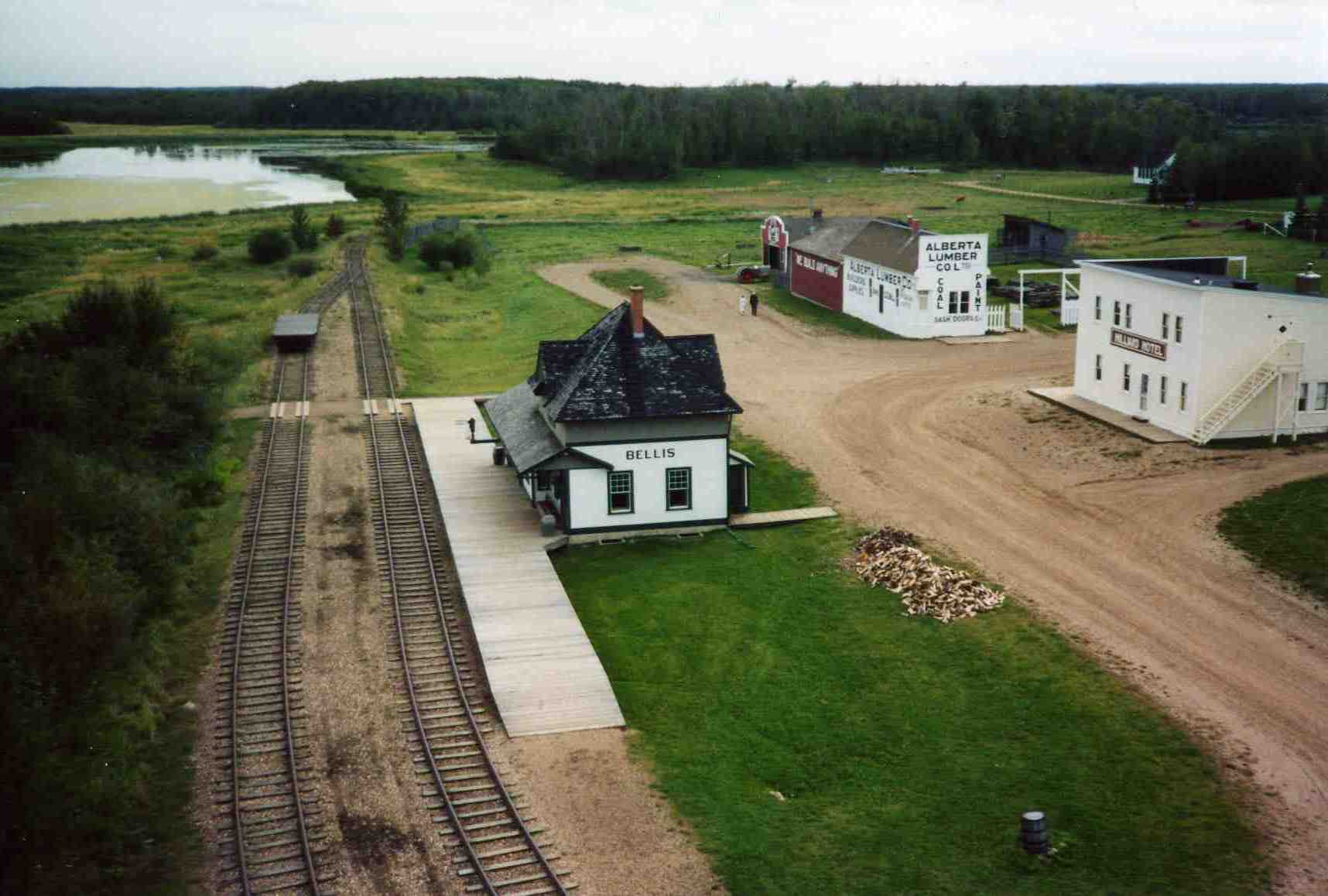
- Established: 1974
- Location: Lamont County, east of Elk Island National Park, Alberta, Canada
- Type: open-air, living history
- Website: www.history.alberta.ca/ukrainianvillage

Open to the public from the May long weekend to Labour Day, the Ukrainian Cultural Heritage Village (Ukrainian: Село спадщини української культури, romanized: Selo spadshchyny ukrayins’koi kul’tury) is an open-air museum that uses costumed historical interpreters to recreate pioneer settlements in east central Alberta, Canada, northeast and east of Edmonton. In particular it shows the lives of Ukrainian Canadian settlers from the years 1899 to 1930. Buildings from surrounding communities have been moved to the historic site and restored to various years within the first part of the twentieth century.

"The Village", as it is colloquially known, has a very strong commitment to historical authenticity and the concept of living history. The Village uses a technique known as first-person interpretation which requires that the costumed performers remain in character at all times (or as much as is feasibly possible). Actors answer all questions as if it is the year their building portrays. Although this technique is startling for some visitors at first, it allows for a much stronger experience of immersion in history than traditional third-person interpretation, where the actor acknowledges that he is, in fact, in a museum.

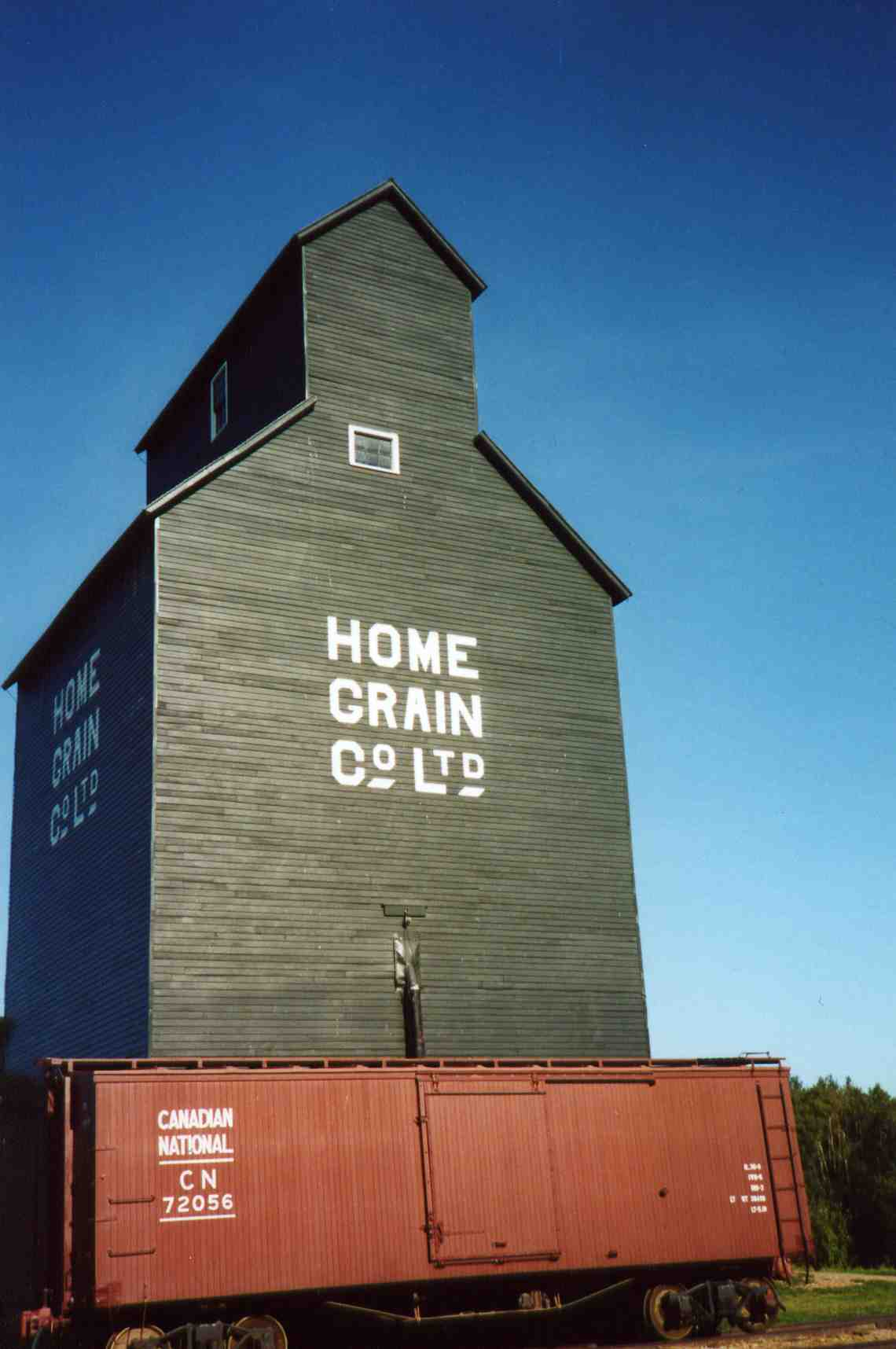
Home Grain Co. Elevator, built circa 1922, restored to 1929 appearance.

The village is in Lamont County on the Yellowhead highway, on the eastern edge of Elk Island National Park.

== Monuments ==
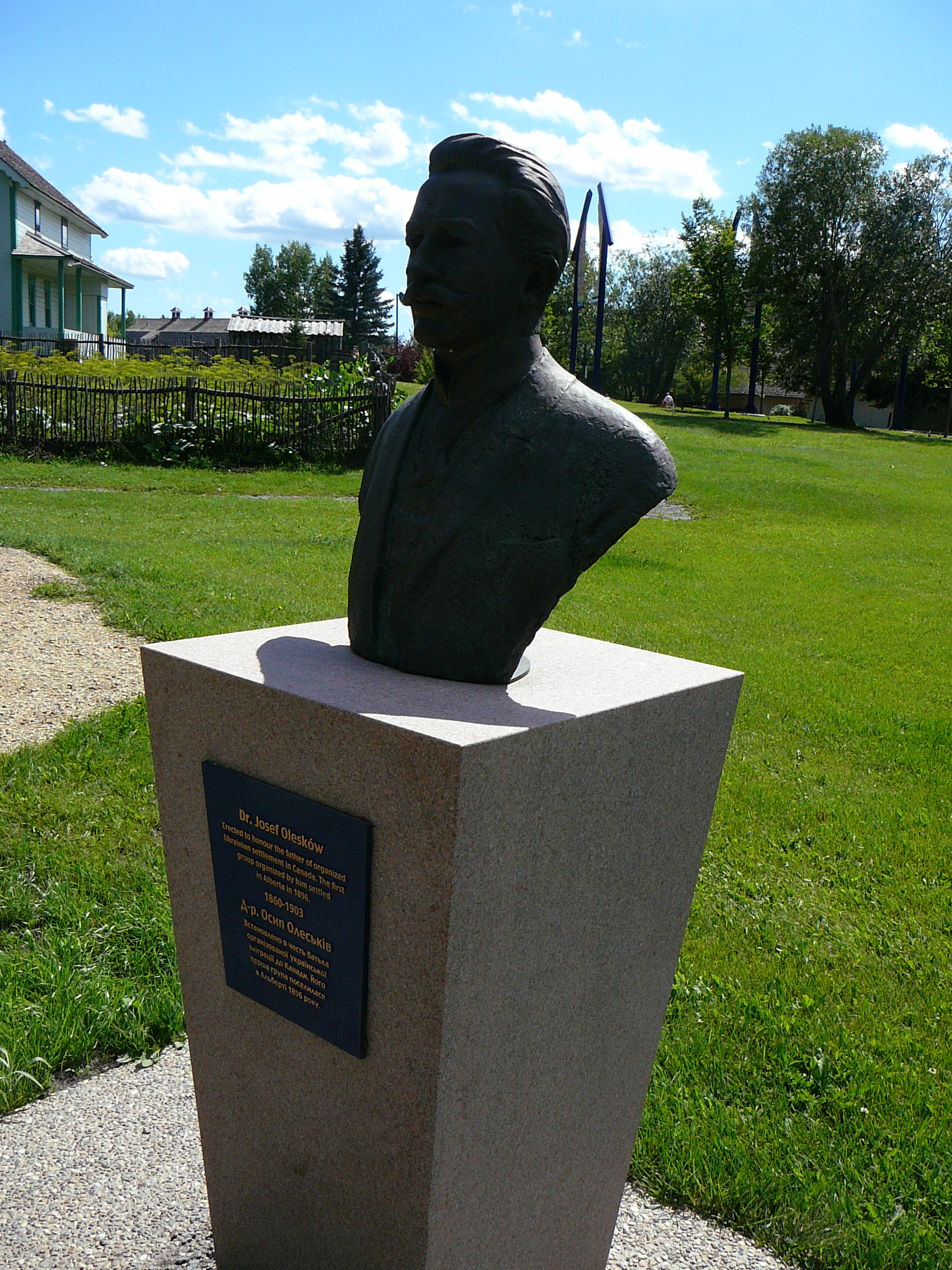
Bust of Joseph Oleskow

- Alberta Centenary Pioneer Recognition Monument
- Cenotaph to the Ukrainian Canadian Soldier
- Joseph Olesków Monument – by Leo Mol
- Pioneer Family Monument – by Leo Mol
- Statue of Vasyl' Stefanyk
- Ukrainian Canadian Internment Camp Monument
- Chornobyl Disaster Commemorative Cross
- Stelmach House

== Buildings ==
The Museum is divided into thematic areas: Overview, Farmsteads, Rural Communities, and Town sites.

Note: the spellings used for names and locations are those from the time to which the building has been restored, and may not match those in use today

Name (indicates the name of the owners or operators of a building and its original location), as well as the time period to which it has been restored

=== Overview ===
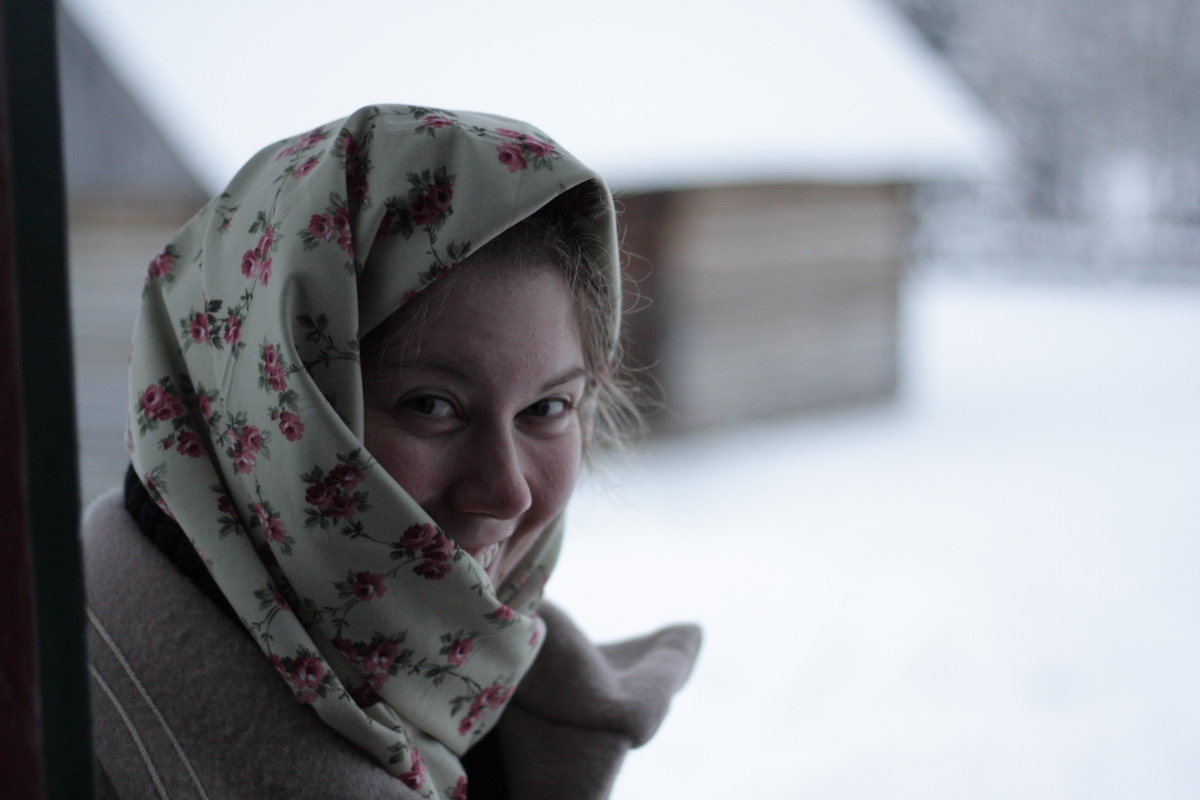
An interpreter from the Village

Provides an introduction to Galician and Bukovinian immigration to Canada by showing the homes of three settler families. Iwan Pylypow was one of two individuals who set off the mass migration of Ukrainians to Canada at the end of the 19th century. His family was Galician. His third house in Canada is preserved at the Village. The second house is that of Mykhailo and Vaselina Hawreliak. The Hawreliaks were a large Ukrainian Bukovinian family who settled in the Shandro area. By the 1920s Mykhailo Hawreliak was quite successful, and the house preserved here has five bedrooms and a cistern that collected rainwater for use in the kitchen. The Nazar Yurko family was also from Bukovina, but was of Romanian descent.

- Pylypow House (Star, Alberta; Built 1906, depicts 1923–1929)
- Hawreliak House (Shandro, Alberta; Built 1919, depicts 1925–1928)
- Yurko House (Boian, Alberta; Built 1920, depicts 1932)

=== Farmsteads ===
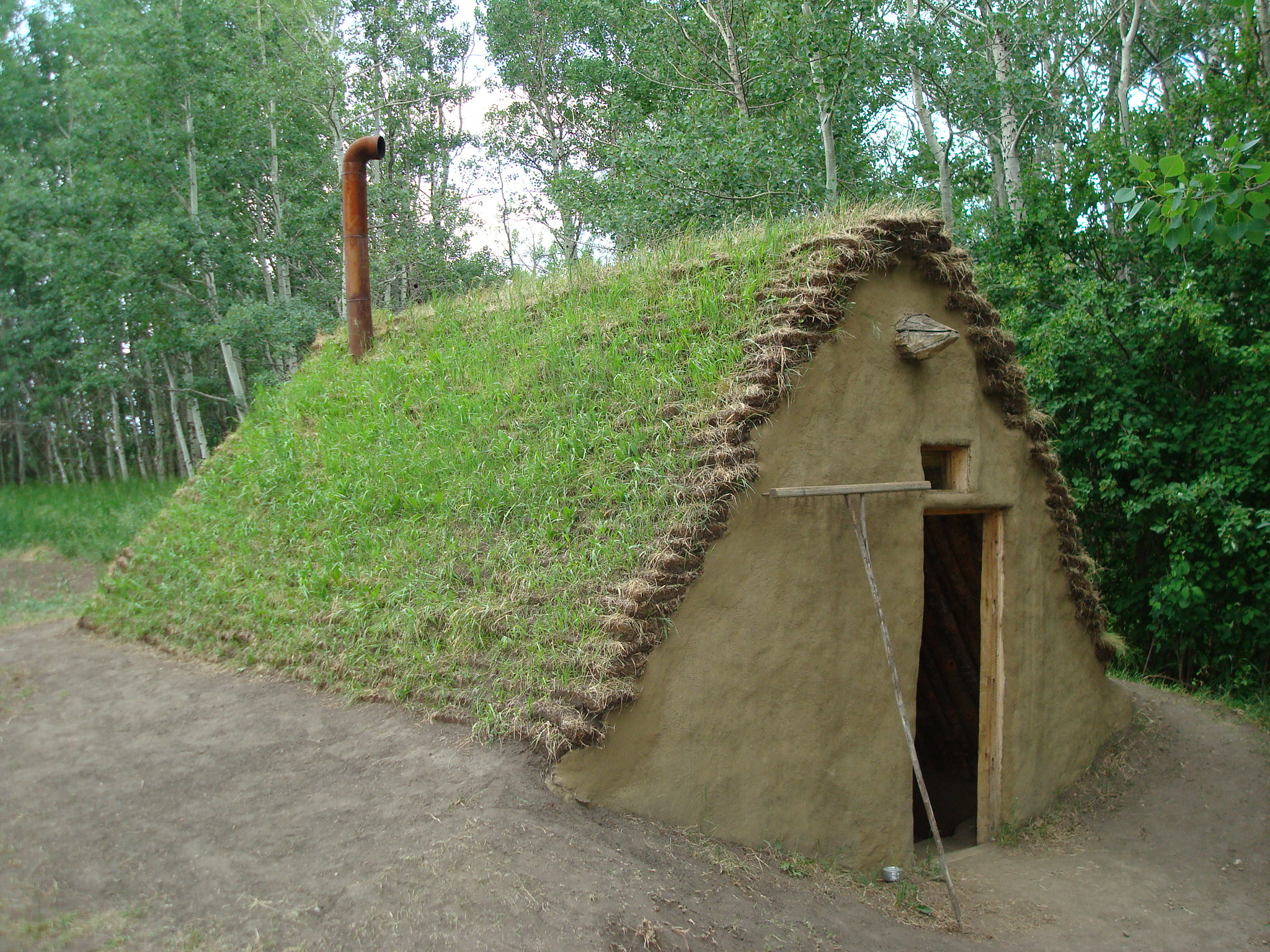
The "burdei" at the Ukrainian Cultural Heritage Village.

Shows different farmyards from different eras/stages of development.

- Township Survey Marker (Reconstruction to circa 1892) – marked the corner of a Township (36 square miles), containing 160 acre plots of land available under the Dominion Lands Act for homesteading. The townships were surveyed prior to the mass influx of European immigration to the Canadian Prairies

==== The newly arrived immigrants ====
- Burdei – Based on field research and archaeological findings; reconstructed to 1900 - Temporary shelters dug out of the ground or into

the side of a hill were a common feature of the earliest farms of the Ukrainian immigrant settlers.

==== The Bukovinian settlers ====
- Grekul House (Toporivtsi, Alberta; Built 1915, depicts 1918–1919)
- Grekul Granary (Toporivtsi, Alberta; Built 1908-1909, depicts 1918–1919
- Grekul Barn (Toporivtsi, Alberta; Built 1915, depicts 1918–1919
- Roswiyczuk Granary (North Kotzman, Alberta; Built 1914, depicts 1918)
- Makowichuk Barn (South Kotzman, Alberta; Built 1912, depicts 1918)

==== The Galician settlers ====
- Hlus' House (Buchach, Alberta; Built 1915–1916, depicts 1918)
- Hlus' Barn (Buchach, Alberta; Built 1915, depicts 1918)
- Hlus' Chicken Coop (Buchach, Alberta; Built 1915, depicts 1918)
- Lakusta Barn (Amelia-Cookville, Alberta; Built 1915, depicts 1918)
- Lakusta Granary (Amelia-Cookville, Alberta; Built 1912, depicts 1918)

==== The later immigrants ====
- Slemko House (South Kotzman, Alberta; Built 1912, depicts 1919)
- Slemko Granary (South Kotzman, Alberta; Built 1913, depicts 1919)
- Slemko Barn (South Kotzman, Alberta Built 1914, depicts 1919)
- Pigsty (Based on field research; reconstructed to 1919)

==== Ukrainian-Canadian farmers ====
- Hewko House (Podola, Alberta; Built 1917–1924, depicts 1930)
- Kitt Threshing Machine Shed (Myrnam, Alberta; Built 1922, depicts 1930)
- Chernochan Machine Shed (Smoky Lake, Alberta; Built 1915, depicts 1925-1928

=== Rural community (reflecting 1925–30 time period) ===
- Roadside Shrine (Based on field research; reconstructed to 1919)
- Luzan Grocery (Luzan, Alberta; Built 1927, depicts 1929)
- Luzan Post Office (Luzan, Alberta; Built 1926, depicts 1929)
- Kiew Hall – a community hall; originally independent, later (1930s) affiliated with the Ukrainian Labour Farmer Temple Association (Kiew, Alberta; Built 1924, depicts 1930))
- St. Nicholas Russo-Greek Orthodox Church (Kiew, Alberta; Built 1908, depicts 1925–1928)
- Kolody Sawmill (Vilna, Alberta; Manufactured 1927, depicts 1929)
- Russia School (Musidora, Alberta; Built 1910, depicts 1926–1929)
- Russia School Barn (Musidora, Alberta; Built 1926, depicts 1926–1929)
- South River Teacher’s Shack (South River, Alberta; Built 1921, depicts 1927)
- St. Nicholas Ukrainian Greek Catholic Church (also known as St. Mary's or Hlus' Church) (Buchach, Alberta; Built 1912, depicts 1930)

=== Town site (reflecting 1925–30 time period) ===
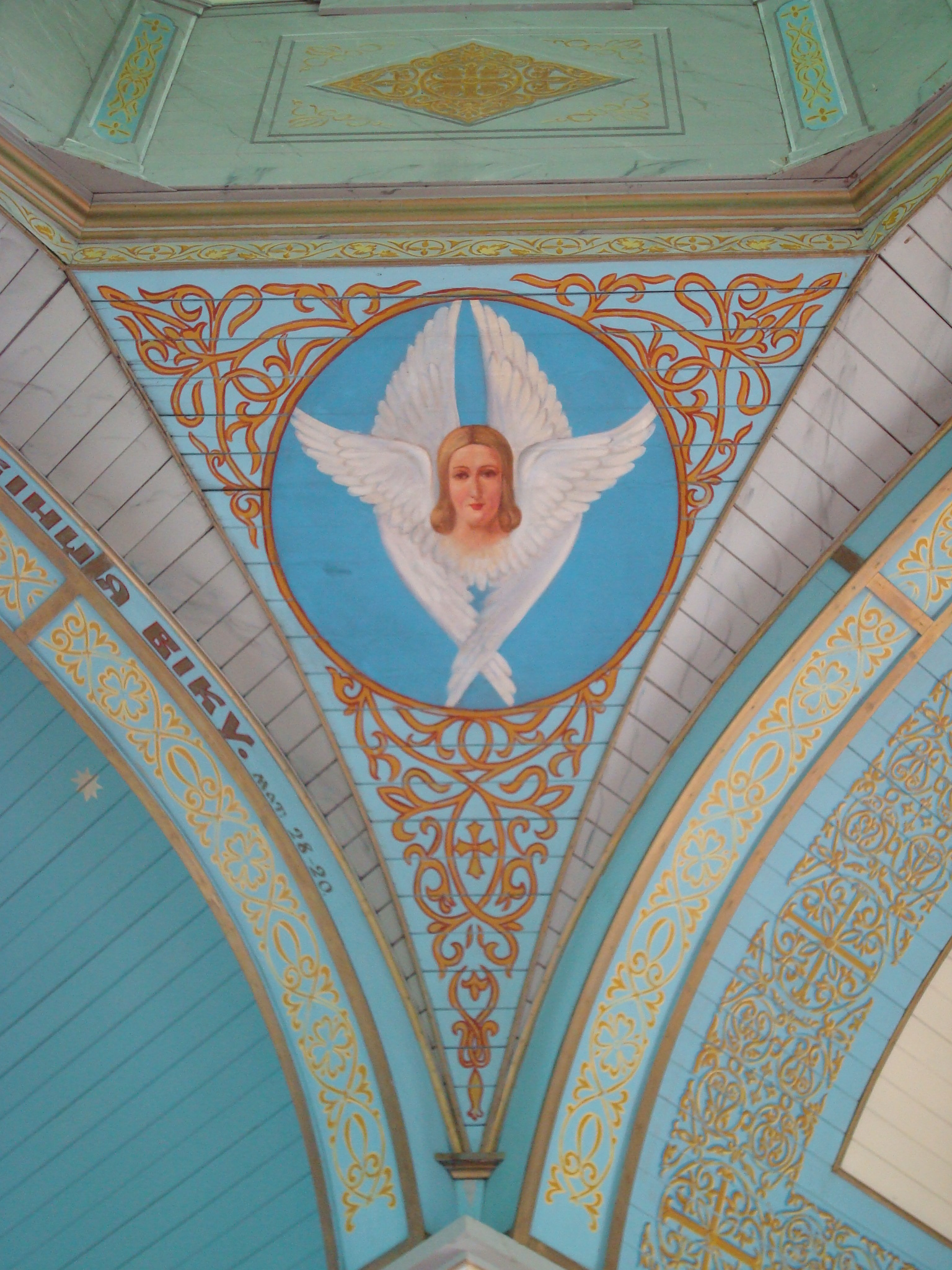
St. Vladimir's Ukrainian Greek Orthodox Church (detail of interior mural), originally located in Vegreville, Alberta.

- St. Vladimir's Ukrainian Greek Orthodox Church (Vegreville, Alberta; Built 1934, depicts 1934–1935)
- Wostok Hardware Store (Wostok, Alberta; Built 1937–1938, depicts 1939)
- Hilliard Pool Hall (Hilliard, Alberta; Built 1925, depicts 1930)
- Hilliard Pool Hall Stable & Garage (Hilliard, Alberta; Built 1925, depicts 1930)
- Market Square
- Radway Post Office, Telephone Exchange, and Municipal District Office (Radway, Alberta; Built 1920, depicts 1929)
- Radway Postmaster’s Garage (Radway, Alberta; Built 1927, depicts 1929)
- Radway Livery Barn (Radway, Alberta; Built 1927, depicts 1929)
- Pawlenchuk Lot Barn (Smoky Lake, Alberta; Built 1930, depicts 1932)
- United Merchants of Alberta General Store (Smoky Lake, Alberta; Built 1932, depicts 1932)
- Andrew Alberta Provincial Police Post (Andrew, Alberta; Built 1913, depicts 1925–1928)
- Bellis Home Grain Co. Elevator (Bellis, Alberta; Built 1922, depicts 1928)
- Bellis Canadian National Railway Station (Bellis, Alberta; Built 1923, depicts 1928)
- Morecambe School (Morecambe, Alberta; Built 1929, depicts 1930)
- Hilliard Hotel (Hilliard, Alberta; Built 1928, depicts 1929)
- Alberta Lumber Co. Office (Lamont, Alberta; Built 1907–1910, depicts 1928)
- Alberta Lumber Company Cement Shed (Lamont, Alberta; Built 1906, depicts 1928)
- Alberta Lumber Company Coal Shed (Lamont, Alberta)
- Demchuk Blacksmith Shop (Myrnam, Alberta; Built 1927, depicts 1929)
- Demchuk House (Myrnam, Alberta; Built 1928, depicts 1929)
- Woodworking Shop (Based on field research; reconstructed to 1930)

== Affiliations ==
The Museum is affiliated with: CMA, CHIN, and Virtual Museum of Canada.

== See also ==
- Kalyna Country – an ecomuseum region in East Central Alberta, of which the Village is a part
- List of Canadian place names of Ukrainian origin – some of the places where the Village's buildings and machines are from are listed on this page (in the Alberta section)
- Narodny dim – community halls with a Ukrainian cultural emphasis concentrated in districts inhabited by Ukrainian Canadians across the Prairie provinces
