= Miquelon Lake Provincial Park =

Provincial park in Alberta, Canada

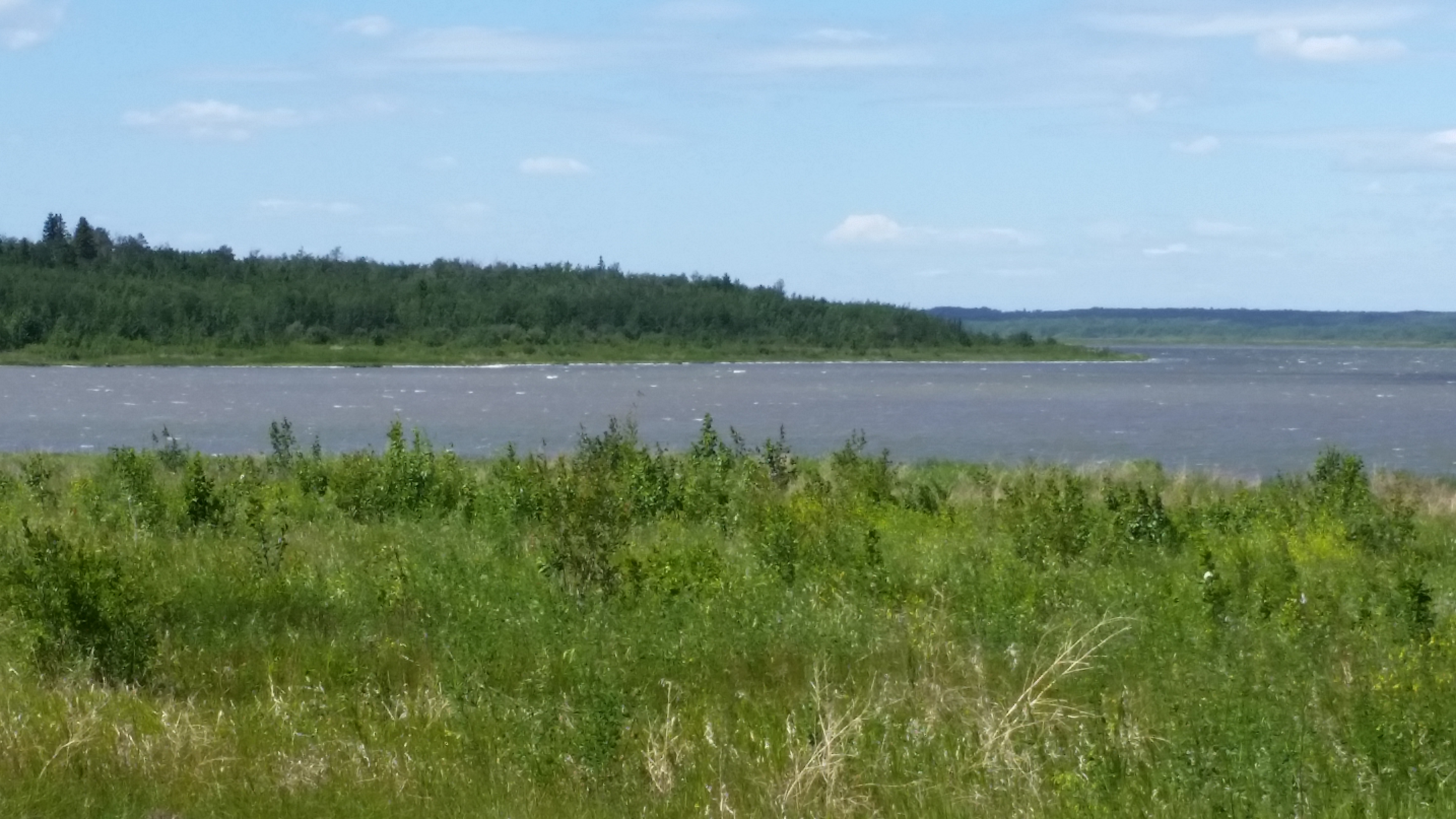

- Location within Alberta
- Interactive map of Miquelon Lake Provincial Park
- Location: Alberta, Canada
- Nearest city: Edmonton
- Coordinates: 53°15′03″N 112°52′52″W
- Area: 12.99 square kilometres (5.02 sq mi)
- Established: 1958
- Governing body: Alberta Environment and Protected Areas

Miquelon Lake Provincial Park is a provincial park in Alberta, Canada, about 65 kilometres southeast of the city of Edmonton. The park features several lakes, the largest of them being Miquelon Lake.

== History ==
In 1920, the area which is now Miquelon Lake Provincial Park was designated as a bird sanctuary. However, in 1926, a 16 ft. deep canal was excavated to divert the lake water in the opposite direction to the Lyseng reservoir in the Battle River watershed, to serve the city of Camrose. This resulted in a significant reduction of the lake's water, severely damaging both the lake and its watershed. In 1944, the city of Camrose attempted to extract more water from the lake, but found it to be of poor quality. The namesake provincial park was established on May 20, 1958 with the help of local land donations from a non profit in the city of Camrose, Alberta. 8.

Today's Miquelon Lake Provincial Park is a popular recreation destination for families and locals from miles around. Boasting a 20km trail network, 7 group campsites and over 270 regular campsites. It also serves as the southern anchor of protected lands that comprise the Beaver Hills biosphere, a UNESCO recognized area along with portions of Strathcona County, Beaver County, Cooking Lake Blackfoot Provincial Recreation Area and Elk Island National Park. Miquelon Lake is also a part of the Beaver Hills Dark Sky Preserve and is designated as an international IBA (important bird area). A colony of White Pelicans has re-established on one of the lake's many small islands in recent years and the parks biodiversity is flourishing.

== Activities ==
- Interpretive & Education Programs: During the months of July and August, the park offers free interpretive programs for visiting families and guests. These include a variety of nature-based guided walks, Saturday evening Amphitheatre shows, presentations and other family-friendly outdoor activities. Listings of these programs can seasonally be found on Miquelon's event webpage as well as advertisement posters throughout the park during July and August. The Park also offers Alberta curriculum-based field-trip education programs for schools for the months of May/June and Sept/October. A complete listing of what school programs are available and how to book them can be found on Miquelon's school program webpage.
- Beach: On the shallow western side, a beach is located, along with phones, playgrounds, paved paths, and several other amenities. The beach has a designated swimming and recreation area, although swimming is not recommend due to high bacterial count, and generally low water levels.
- Birding: Many species of birds stop at this location in their migration patterns.
- Boating: There is a hand-launch at the park. The largest lake, Miquelon Lake, is available for paddling by Canoe or Kayak. No motorized boats are allowed on the lake due to its shallow nature.
- Camping: Numerous campsites are available, in multiple different blocks. There are options for electricity campsites and electricity-less campsites.
- Sports: Ice skating, cross-country skiing paths, hiking trails, snowshoeing paths, and a golf course are located at or near the park.
- Farmers' Market: In the months of July and August a farmers' market is held beside the Park Centre.
- Stargazing: the park is part of the Beaver Hills Dark Sky Preserve and is home to the Hesje observatory, owned and operated by the Augustana campus of the University of Alberta (public viewing nights and special events happen regularly).
- Hiking: The trail system offers nearly 20kms of beginner to intermediate level trails that serve as a good place to be introduced to backcountry hiking.
