= Elk Island National Park =

National park in Alberta, Canada

- Parc national Elk Island
- IUCN category II (national park)
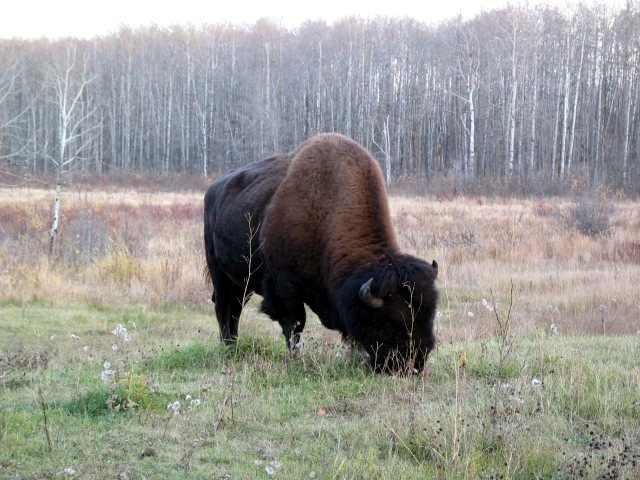
- Bison grazing in Elk Island National Park

- Location within Canada Location within Alberta
- Interactive map of Elk Island National Park
- Location: Alberta, Canada
- Nearest city: Edmonton
- Coordinates: 53°36′52″N 112°51′58″W
- Area: 194 km^{2} (75 sq mi)
- Established: 1913
- Visitors: 401,891 (in 2022–23)
- Governing body: Parks Canada

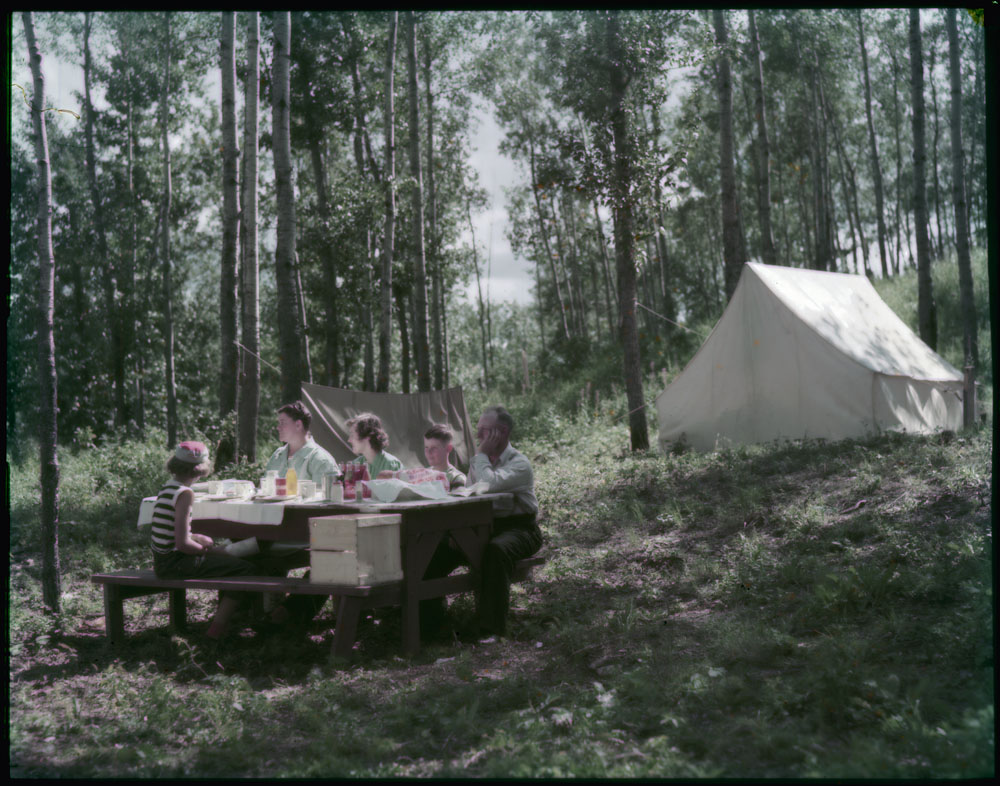
Camping at the park, 1950

Elk Island National Park is a national park in Alberta, Canada, that played an important part in the conservation of the plains bison. The park is administered by the Parks Canada Agency. This "island of conservation" is 35 km (22 mi) east of Edmonton, along the Yellowhead Highway, which goes through the park. It is Canada's eighth smallest in area but largest fully enclosed national park, with an area of 194 km^{2} (75 mi^{2}).

The park is representative of the northern prairies plateau ecosystem and as such, the knob and kettle landscape is a mix of native fescue grassland that has been converted to forage land dominated by non-native grasses, aspen parkland and boreal forest. As well, Elk Island hosts both the largest and the smallest terrestrial mammals in North America, the wood bison and pygmy shrew respectively.

== History ==
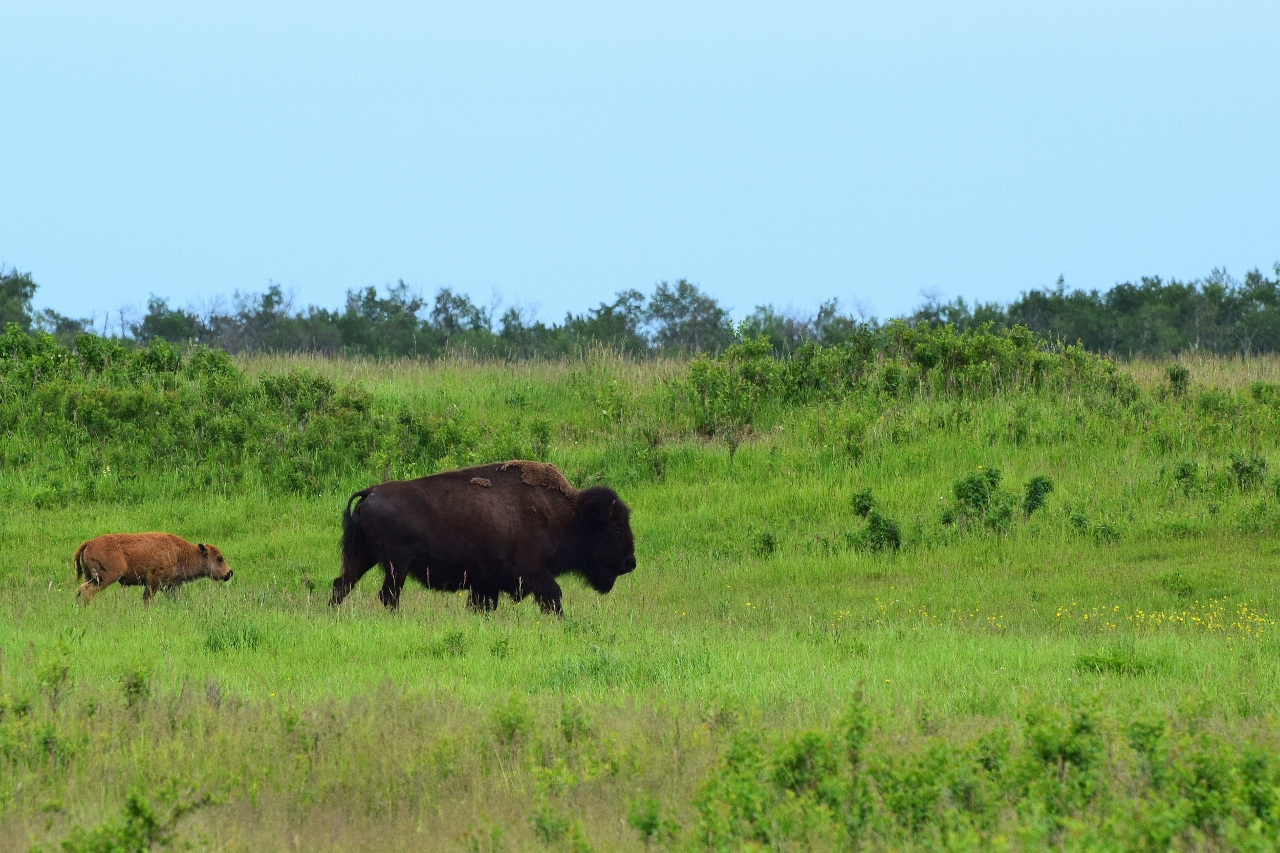
American bison cow and calf

Elk Island National Park is situated in the Beaverhills area, which with its aspen thickets and easy access to water, has provided shelter for wintering herds of elk, bison and moose since times immemorial. Though there was never any permanent indigenous settlement in the area, there are over 200 archaeological remains of campsites and stone tool-making sites. The land has been influenced by the Blackfoot, Sarcee and Cree indigenous groups.

In early post-Contact history, the Beaverhills area was primarily used for commercial hunting. This led to overhunting and the virtual elimination of beaver from the area by the 1830s and of large ungulates by the 1860s. The area then became valuable for timber until 1894, when fire swept through it. In 1899, the federal government designated the area the "Cooking Lake Forest Reserve". But while the forest was protected, it did little to protect the moose, elk and deer populations. Thus, in 1906, five men from Fort Saskatchewan put forward $5000 and petitioned the federal government to set up an elk sanctuary, calling it "Elk Park". Elk Island Park was later granted federal park status in 1913, and then designation as an official National Park under the National Parks Act which passed through the Canadian Parliament in 1930.

In 1951, a replica of a pioneer cabin was built in the park to honour the Ukrainian Canadians who pioneered the area. This replica, known as the Ukrainian Pioneer Home, was the first museum or historic site ever dedicated to Ukrainian immigration in Canada. It was later declared a Classified Federal Heritage Building by the federal government in 1993.

In terms of local governance, those lands within Elk Island National Park were incorporated as Improvement District (ID) No. 97 on April 1, 1958. ID No. 97 was renumbered to ID No. 13 on January 1, 1969.

== Wildlife ==
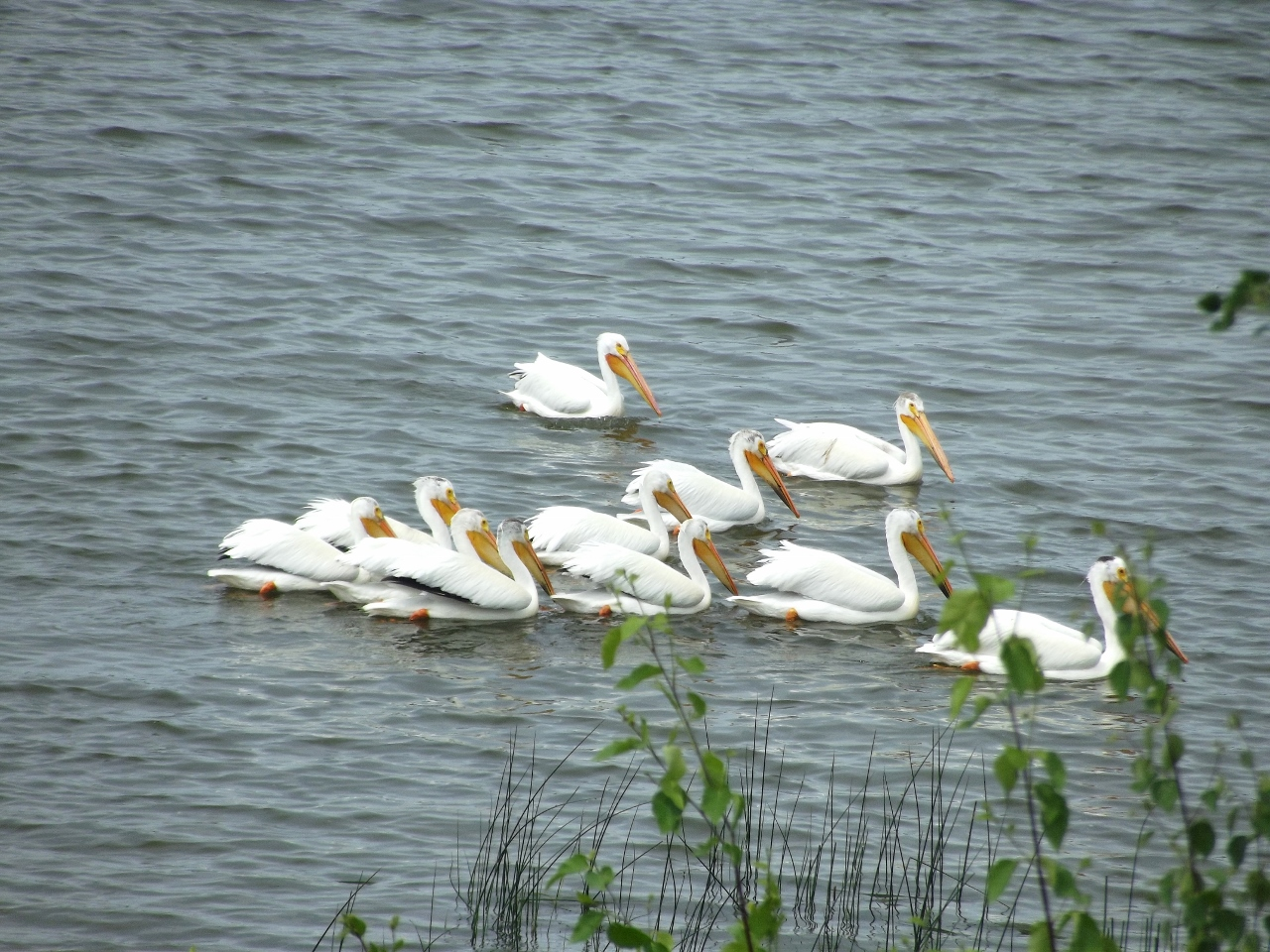
Pelicans on Astotin Lake

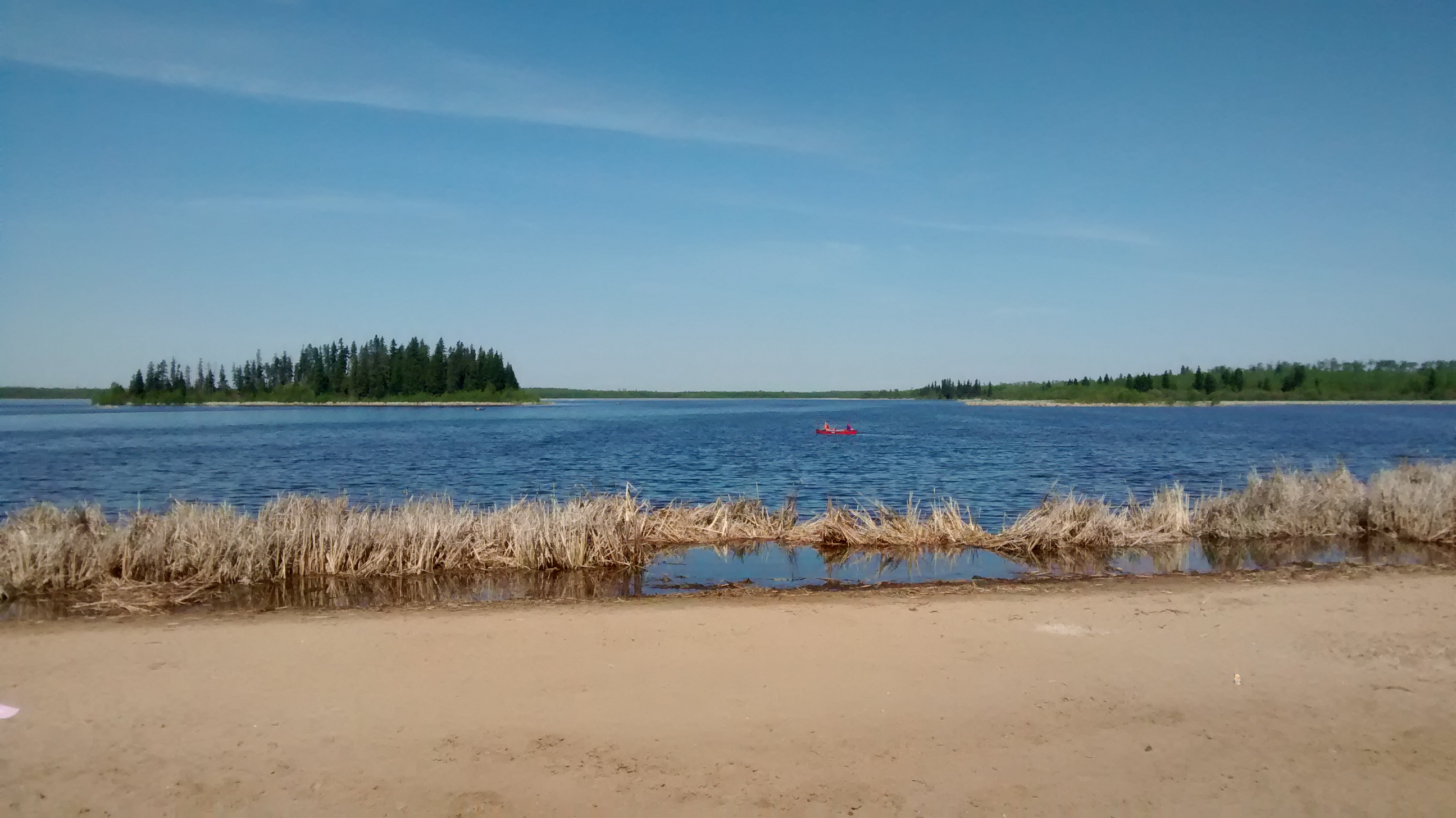
Astotin Lake

Elk Island is home to the densest population of ungulates (hoofed mammals) in Canada. A variety of mammal species including coyote, bison, moose, mule deer, lynx, beaver, elk, white-tailed deer, and porcupine are year-round residents. Black bears and northwestern wolves certainly roam within this park, but they are not commonly seen by wildlife viewers. Over 250 bird species can be found in the park at various times of year. Most notable among these are the red-necked grebes, American white pelicans, double-crested cormorants, great blue herons, red-tailed hawks, American bitterns and the trumpeter swans.

=== Wildlife management ===
Elk Island National Park maintains a thriving elk population, estimated at 605 in 2007, as well as around 300 moose and over 500 deer. Parks Canada transferred 18 moose from Elk Island to Nova Scotia's Cape Breton Highlands National Park between 1947 and 1948. Reintroduction of traditional species has been an important focus as well. Besides the success of the wood and plains bison introduction, beavers were reintroduced in 1942, and in 2007 numbered near 1000. 1987 saw the beginning of a trumpeter swan reintroduction programme, which as of 2007 was seeing mating pairs returning to Elk Island, raising hope for a sustainable population.

Elk Island National Park also remains a seed herd for repopulation efforts in other areas. Elk Island elk have been relocated to various parts North America, including Ontario and the foothills of the Rocky Mountains. Plains bison have been reintroduced to conservation areas scattered throughout their historic domain, for example American Prairie in eastern Montana, Grasslands National Park and the Old Man on His Back Prairie and Heritage Conservation Area in Saskatchewan, and in 2006, 30 wood bison were relocated to the Republic of Sakha (Yakutia) to begin repopulation efforts of the area historically inhabited by the now extinct steppe bison.

=== Bison conservation ===
Elk Island National Park has a prominent history in large ungulate conservation. As early as 1907, the Canadian government bought one of the last and largest remaining pure-bred plains bison, the Pablo-Allard herd, from Montana. Close to 400 bison were shipped to Elk Island as a temporary waystation until the fencing at Buffalo Park in Wainwright was completed. In 1909 the fence was finished and 325 bison were relocated to Buffalo National Park. However, 40–70 bison evaded capture and became the ancestors of today's herd in Elk Island National Park. Since 2007, Parks Canada has actively managed a herd of about 400 pure-bred and disease-free plains bison and 300 wood bison in Elk Island. When the population exceeds this number, the excess bison are sold. The proceeds of the sales go to help finance the needs of national parks.

In the late 19th century, only 300 wood bison remained worldwide, almost exclusively in Wood Buffalo National Park. During the 1920s, 6,000–7,000 plains bison were also relocated to Wood Buffalo National Park. These bison were not only infected with brucellosis and tuberculosis, which infected the wood bison herd, but the wood and plains subspecies also interbred, and thus it was thought that wood bison were completely extinct by the 1940s. In 1957, however, a disease-free, not fully but relatively pure wood bison herd of 200 was discovered near Nyarling river in Wood Buffalo National Park. In 1965, 23 of these bison were relocated to the south side of Elk Island National Park and remain there today as the most genetically pure wood bison remaining. In 2007, the wood bison population in Elk Island National Park was estimated at 315.

Elk Island has become famous for exporting its ungulates to other conservation areas around North America, and even to Russia. In 1996, elk were sent to Land Between The Lakes National Recreation Area in Kentucky. Starting in 2005, a series of plains bison deliveries were made to the American Prairie in northeastern Montana, including 94 head in 2010 and 72 in 2012. Three groups of 30 wood bison were sent to the Republic of Sakha, in the Russian Federation, partly to replace the extinct steppe bison in the habitat but also as protection against any disease wiping out the North American herd of that species.

Conservationists transferred fifty-three wood bison from this national park to the Alaska Wildlife Conservation Center in June 2008. They were absent from Alaskan boreal forests for nearly one hundred years.

The shallow lakes of Elk Island National Park have seen fatalities in their fish population, due to oxygen depletion during the winter. The construction of a dam across the main drainage system outside the park disrupted the migration of several native fish species from the North Saskatchewan River into Astotin Lake. A 2025 study using specimens collected from the lake in 2022 noted brook stickleback were present in the area. Fishing is prohibited in the national park.

== Climate ==
Climate data for Elk Island National Park, Alberta, 1981–2010 normals, extremes 1981–present
Month	Jan	Feb	Mar	Apr	May	Jun	Jul	Aug	Sep	Oct	Nov	Dec	Year
Record high humidex	11.5	14.1	19.5	24.6	32.3	34.9	39.2	42.2	34.3	26.2	19.0	14.1	42.2
Record high °C (°F)	11.7 (53.1)	15.5 (59.9)	20.7 (69.3)	26.5 (79.7)	31.0 (87.8)	33.3 (91.9)	35.4 (95.7)	34.5 (94.1)	30.9 (87.6)	28.5 (83.3)	20.0 (68.0)	14.8 (58.6)	35.4 (95.7)
Mean daily maximum °C (°F)	−6.2 (20.8)	−2.5 (27.5)	1.2 (34.2)	10.8 (51.4)	17.0 (62.6)	20.8 (69.4)	23.2 (73.8)	22.1 (71.8)	16.1 (61.0)	9.9 (49.8)	−0.3 (31.5)	−4.1 (24.6)	9.0 (48.2)
Daily mean °C (°F)	−12.0 (10.4)	−9.3 (15.3)	−5.1 (22.8)	4.2 (39.6)	10.6 (51.1)	14.6 (58.3)	17.0 (62.6)	15.7 (60.3)	10.1 (50.2)	4.3 (39.7)	−5.2 (22.6)	−9.5 (14.9)	3.0 (37.4)
Mean daily minimum °C (°F)	−17.8 (0.0)	−15.9 (3.4)	−11.4 (11.5)	−2.4 (27.7)	4.1 (39.4)	8.4 (47.1)	10.8 (51.4)	9.2 (48.6)	4.0 (39.2)	−1.3 (29.7)	−10.0 (14.0)	−15.1 (4.8)	−3.1 (26.4)
Record low °C (°F)	−43.4 (−46.1)	−40.5 (−40.9)	−42.5 (−44.5)	−30.0 (−22.0)	−7.4 (18.7)	−0.9 (30.4)	3.3 (37.9)	−1.0 (30.2)	−6.7 (19.9)	−21.5 (−6.7)	−35.0 (−31.0)	−38.5 (−37.3)	−43.4 (−46.1)
Record low wind chill	−45.4	−40.5	−35.4	−26.4	−13.1	−1.5	0.0	0.0	−8.5	−21	−37.2	−42.4	−45.4
Average precipitation mm (inches)	18.2 (0.72)	11.3 (0.44)	21.5 (0.85)	26.3 (1.04)	49.4 (1.94)	85.3 (3.36)	112.1 (4.41)	52.5 (2.07)	53.7 (2.11)	20.1 (0.79)	15.3 (0.60)	16.8 (0.66)	482.4 (18.99)
Average rainfall mm (inches)	0.9 (0.04)	0.2 (0.01)	2.0 (0.08)	13.8 (0.54)	44.0 (1.73)	85.3 (3.36)	112.1 (4.41)	52.5 (2.07)	53.6 (2.11)	11.2 (0.44)	1.2 (0.05)	0.9 (0.04)	377.7 (14.87)
Average snowfall cm (inches)	18.5 (7.3)	11.9 (4.7)	20.6 (8.1)	12.8 (5.0)	5.4 (2.1)	0.0 (0.0)	0.0 (0.0)	0.0 (0.0)	0.1 (0.0)	9.2 (3.6)	15.9 (6.3)	16.4 (6.5)	110.7 (43.6)
Average precipitation days (≥ 0.2mm)	9.2	6.6	8.5	7.0	11.0	15.0	16.3	12.8	13.1	9.0	7.2	9.1	124.8
Average rainy days (≥ 0.2mm)	0.8	0.35	1.4	4.5	10.5	15.0	16.3	12.8	13.1	6.9	1.6	0.94	84.19
Average snowy days (≥ 0.2 cm)	8.5	6.3	7.6	3.1	0.70	0.0	0.0	0.0	0.06	2.8	6.1	8.6	43.76
Source: Environment Canada

== Activities ==
Elk Island National Park is open 24 hours a day, seven days a week, year-round. Park user fees apply. Popular year-round activities include birding and wildlife gazing. Winter activities include unserviced camping, hiking, snowshoeing and cross country skiing. Summer activities include hiking, kayaking/canoeing, mountain biking, and unserviced camping. Services include telephones, potable water and year-round washrooms. Swimming is not recommended due to risk of contracting swimmer's itch. Fires are allowed in designated fire pits.

In 1955, a bison cull was filmed for the John Ford film The Searchers.

On September 3, 2006, the Beaver Hills dark-sky preserve, which includes Elk Island National Park within its boundaries, was declared in a ceremony held at Astotin Lake.

A nine-hole golf course was built in Elk Island National Park in 1936, making it one of the oldest golf courses in Alberta. The course was designed by Stanley Thompson and was constructed as part of a work program during the Great Depression. It was built into the terrain of the Beaver Hills, with wide fairways and elevated greens. The course and its restaurant closed in 2022.

== See also ==
- National Parks of Canada
- List of National Parks of Canada
- Ukrainian Cultural Heritage Village which borders the park
- Kalyna Country, an ecomuseum of which Elk Island is a part
- Beaver Hills (Alberta), the area in which Elk Island lies
- List of parks in Alberta
- List of trails in Alberta
- List of mountains of Alberta
- List of waterfalls of Alberta
