= Wasyl Eleniak =

Ukrainian pioneer in Canada

- Eleniak in the 1950s
- Born: December 22, 1859; Nebyliv, Austria-Hungary (present-day Ukraine)
- Died: January 12, 1956 (aged 96); Mundare, Alberta, Canada
- Citizenship: Ukraine; Canada
- Occupations: Logger; farmer
- Known for: First documented Ukrainian emigrant to Canada
- Spouse: Anna Rozhko (m. 1883)
- Children: 8

Wasyl Eleniak (also spelled Vasyl Eleniak; Ukrainian: Василь Єлиняк; December 22, 1859 - 12 January 1956) was one of the first documented Ukrainian immigrants in Canada, along with Ivan Pylypow. Born in Nebyliv, Ukraine, he arrived in Canada in 1891 and settled in Alberta.

== Early life ==
Wasyl Eleniak was born on December 22, 1859, in the village of Nebyliv (now Rozhniativ district, Ivano-Frankivsk Oblast region), to Stephan Eleniak and Eudokia Stefura. He was the oldest of four children. In 1883, Eleniak married a local woman named Anna Rozhko. Together they had at least eight children, three sons and five daughters. After his marriage, Eleniak worked in the logging industry, rafting up the Limnytsia River.

== Emigration to Canada ==
Eleniak heard stories about Canada from German colonists who had relatives there and reported that settlers in the country received 160 acres of land for a pittance. To improve his life, Eleniak decided to emigrate to Canada, for which he teamed up with two fellow villagers, Ivan Pylypow (Pylypivsky) and Yurko Panishchak. In 1891 they left their native village, got to Hamburg, and from there planned to sail to Canada.

Yurko Panishchak lacked money to pay for the trip and was forced to return home, and Eleniak and Ivan Pylypow continued their journey alone. On August 28, they sailed from Liverpool on the ship Oregon and arrived in Quebec on September 19, 1891. They continued the journey to Winnipeg.

After two years of work, Eleniak collected enough money to afford a return to Nebyliv, where he intended to bring his family and several friends to Canada. In his homeland of Ukraine, he received a civil passport from the county government in the city. Along with six other families from his home village, Eleniak returned to Canada on the ship Mongolian on 25 June 1894.

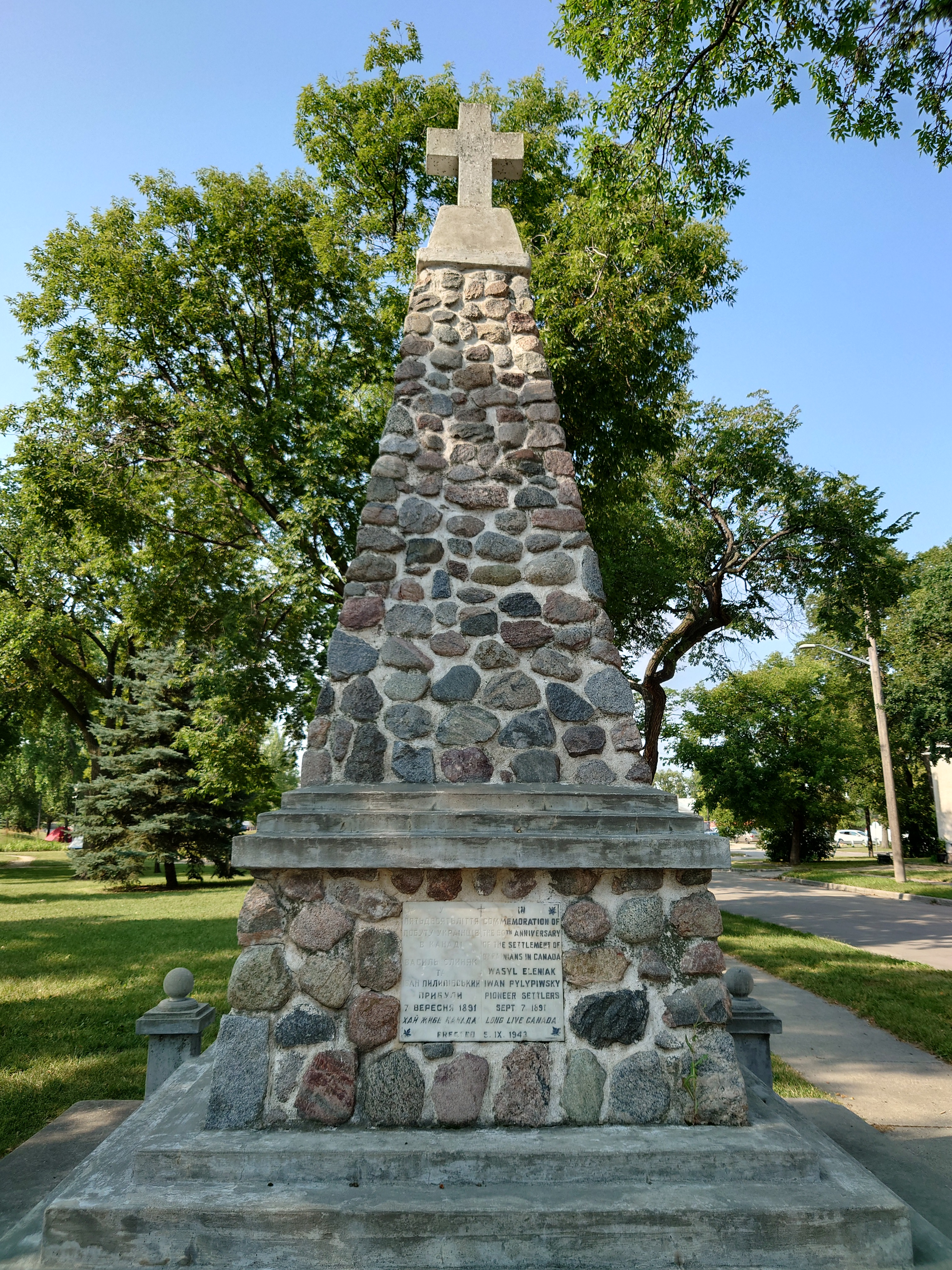
Wasyl Eleniak and Ivan Pylypow memorial in Markian Shaskevich Park, Winnipeg

He founded the town of Edna-Star (later Chipman) in Alberta. He subsequently enjoyed success as a farmer.

On January 3, 1947, Eleniak was one of 26 people to receive Canadian citizenship at the first-ever Canadian citizenship ceremony, presided over by Chief Justice Thibaudeau Rinfret at the Supreme Court in Ottawa.

== Legacy ==
Eleniak is regarded as a trailblazer for the Ukrainian community in Canada. He has been honored with monuments and plaques in Chipman as well as in his native Ukraine. Eleniak's descendants include American actress and model Erika Eleniak, who is his great-granddaughter.
