= Stefan Ustvolsky =

Russian Orthodox priest

Coordinates: 49°54′44.12″N 97°08′2.93″W

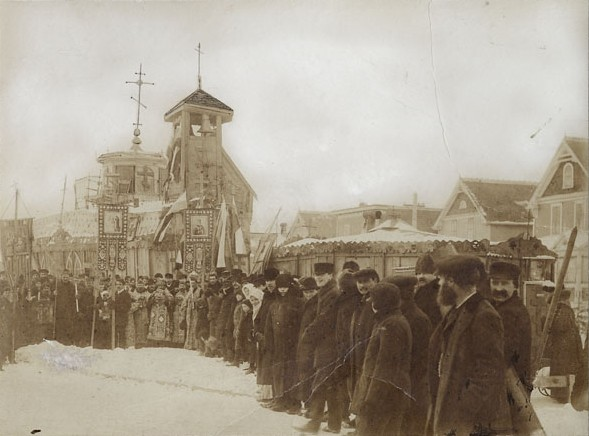
Seraphim and faithful in front of the Tin Can Cathedral.

Stefan Ustvolsky was a Russian Orthodox priest excommunicated from the Most Holy Synod in Saint Petersburg and pretend bishop in early Ukrainian Canadian history. He called himself Bishop Seraphim, Metropolitan of the Orthodox Russian Church for the whole of America and started the All-Russian Patriarchal Orthodox Church in 1903 in Winnipeg. His claim of consecration was backed by forged documentation and the church eventually fell apart around 1908.

== Europe ==
Seraphim was born Stefan Ustvolsky in 1858. Ustvolsky’s name is probably linked with the birthplace of his relatives on his father’s side - the village of Ust’-Volma, Russia. Ustvolsky graduated from the Olonets Theological Seminary, and in 1881 he completed his studies at the Saint Petersburg Theological Academy with a degree in theology and "the right to obtain a master's degree from a new oral test ".

In June 1881, he was appointed a priest in the Moscow court at Verkhospassky Cathedral. In January 1882, he transferred as a priest to the church of the 8th Grenadier Moscow Regiment quartered in Tver. In April 1882, he was accused by the commanding Colonel of the regiment, Ivan Karlović von Burzi (Иван Карлович фон Бурзи), of misconduct which was fully confirmed in the course of the investigation conducted. Ustvolsky requested from the Holy Synod (Прещение), a rebuke or resignation with dignity . The request was granted, and as an exception, by Imperial decree was given to him the right and the rank of a collegiate secretary. After some time, for unknown reasons (obscured by him), this was lost. In May 1901, he entered into the brotherhood of the Novgorod Khutyn Monastery.

Then, he traveled to Mount Athos, to its Russian Monastery. What the Ukrainians in Canada learned about Ustvolsky’s life before his arrival in Canada, what Ustvolsky told of himself, Ivan Bodrug recorded in his memoir: “On Athos, living out his life and fast approaching the grave, was the aged Patriarch Anphim (Анфим). That Patriarch, like the other Patriarchs, disliked Russian Orthodoxy for the reason that in Russia the Tsars had abolished the Patriarchate and substituted themselves as heads of the Orthodox Church. In the monastery at Athos, there lived a Master of Theology, Father Stephen Ustvolsky, who had previously been a Court priest in St. Petersburg (Bodrug may have made a mistake here). When his wife deserted him to live with a Polish Colonel, Ustvolsky became a monk on Athos. The retired Anphim ordained this same Ustvolsky and sent him to America as Bishop in defiance of the Russian Synod.”

The Holy Synod at this time was practically a Russian government agency, and after Anthimus VII had retired from his position, he may have for personal reasons, in protest, because of his dissatisfaction with the circumstances of the Russian Orthodox Church, ordained Ustvolsky as a bishop.

== New York ==
To discard his old identity and to look ahead, according to the religious practice of taking on a new name, Ustvolsky chose Seraphim. Now calling himself Bishop Seraphim, he left for the new world. He arrived in New York in 1902, where he stayed with Ukrainian priests briefly. Again, in Bodrug’s words: “Thus in 1902, Bishop Seraphim arrived unexpectedly from Athos to America. Our dissenters from Catholicism met Seraphim in New York, but found that Seraphim was a Russian patriot who recognized neither Ukraine nor Ukrainians. Disillusioned, they refused to accept him as their Archbishop and later all returned to their Irish Bishops, ‘repenting’ of their errors.”

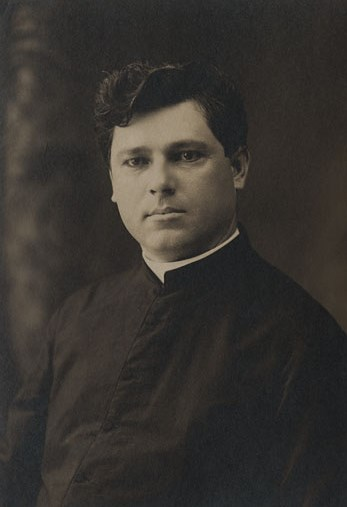
Ivan Bodrug (1874–1952)

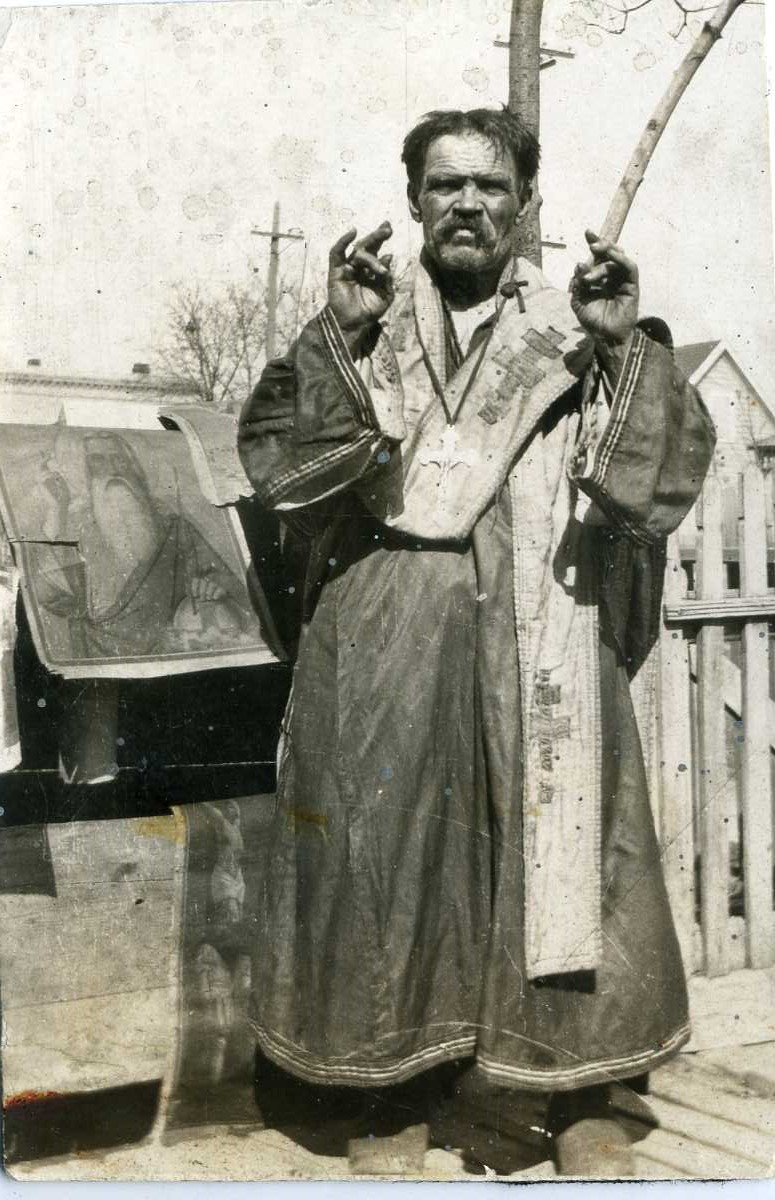
Makarii Marchenko

== Winnipeg ==
Seraphim arrived in Winnipeg in April 1903, along with his assistant Monk Makarii Marchenko. "Due to various indiscretions and problems with alcohol" Seraphim quickly lost the trust of the intelligentsia who invited him to Winnipeg, and a coup took place in which they moved to get rid of him while not losing his congregation. It was decided that Ivan Bodrug and Ivan Negrich would infiltrate Seraphim’s church, as priests. They were already theology students at Manitoba College. Bodrug describes the moment: “Out of that meeting (with Cyril Genik) came the decision that Seraphim could continue as Seraphim, and we would accord him due respect, but, having once established leadership over his priests, we would undertake to preach not Orthodoxy, but Evangelical Christianity. As for the forms and traditions in the Church ritual, we would honour those which did not conflict with the spirit of Christ and the teaching of the Apostles. Within a week of that meeting, Negrich and I went to Winnipeg to see Seraphim. We found him at prayer in his modest room. Genik introduced us to Seraphim, and we turned out to be the first people able to converse with him in his native Russian, which we had learned as leaders of the Doukhobors. (The Principal of Manitoba College had released Bodrug and Negrich from February through May 1899 to help in settling 10,000 Doukhobor immigrants who had arrived from the Caucasus; they worked as interpreters for the Immigration authorities.) Seraphim blessed us using both hands (Bishop’s blessing), and invited us to sit down. He asked us exactly who we were, when we had arrived in Canada, and what schooling we had had. He questioned us as to whether we had the willingness and the call to become Orthodox priests. We told him that we were Protestants by conviction. He smiled and said: 'We will make fine Orthodox priests out of you. The Protestant Anglican Church is a daughter of the Orthodox Eastern Church.'”

Sometime later, Bodrug describes their ordination as priests: “Saturday morning, we accompanied Seraphim on a mission to Brokenhead, about fifty miles east of Winnipeg. The church was small, but a great many people had gathered there. During the service, Seraphim ordained us as priests.” Though apparently Seraphim ordained priests indiscriminately for a fee, it was only so indiscriminate, as according to Bodrug’s account it was tougher for Bodrug and Negrich to get ordained by Seraphim than for them to be accepted as students of theology at Manitoba College.

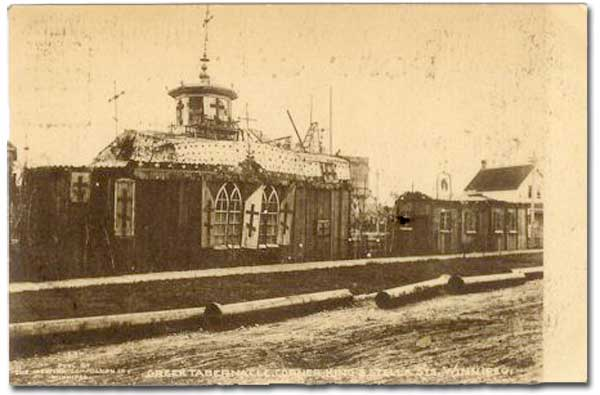
Historic Sites of Manitoba: Bishop Seraphim's Tin Can Cathedral, 1905.

Charismatic, Seraphim "...ordained some 50 priests and numerous deacons, many semi-illiterate, who carried out priestly duties throughout the settlements, preaching independent Orthodoxy and trustee ownership of church property. In two years this church claimed nearly 60,000 adherents…"

Seraphim left for Russia to try to obtain funding for his thriving church. He returned to Winnipeg in the autumn of 1904, but brought no such funds with him. “Those who opposed the Holy Synod did not dare to support Seraphim in Canada. Seraphim did bring back photographs showing him celebrating the Bishop’s Mass, with the assistance of Father Ivan Kronshtadsky, a miracle-worker famous throughout Russia. Many other priests at the altar of the cathedral appeared in that photograph, and Seraphim was in the middle wearing a mitre on his head and with a crozier in his hand.”

Upon his return, Seraphim was astounded to learn that in his absence Bodrug and others had reorganized his church. He excommunicated these priests and anyone who supported them. So began the split between Seraphim’s church and the new Independent Greek Church headed by Bodrug.

== Seraphim's departure ==
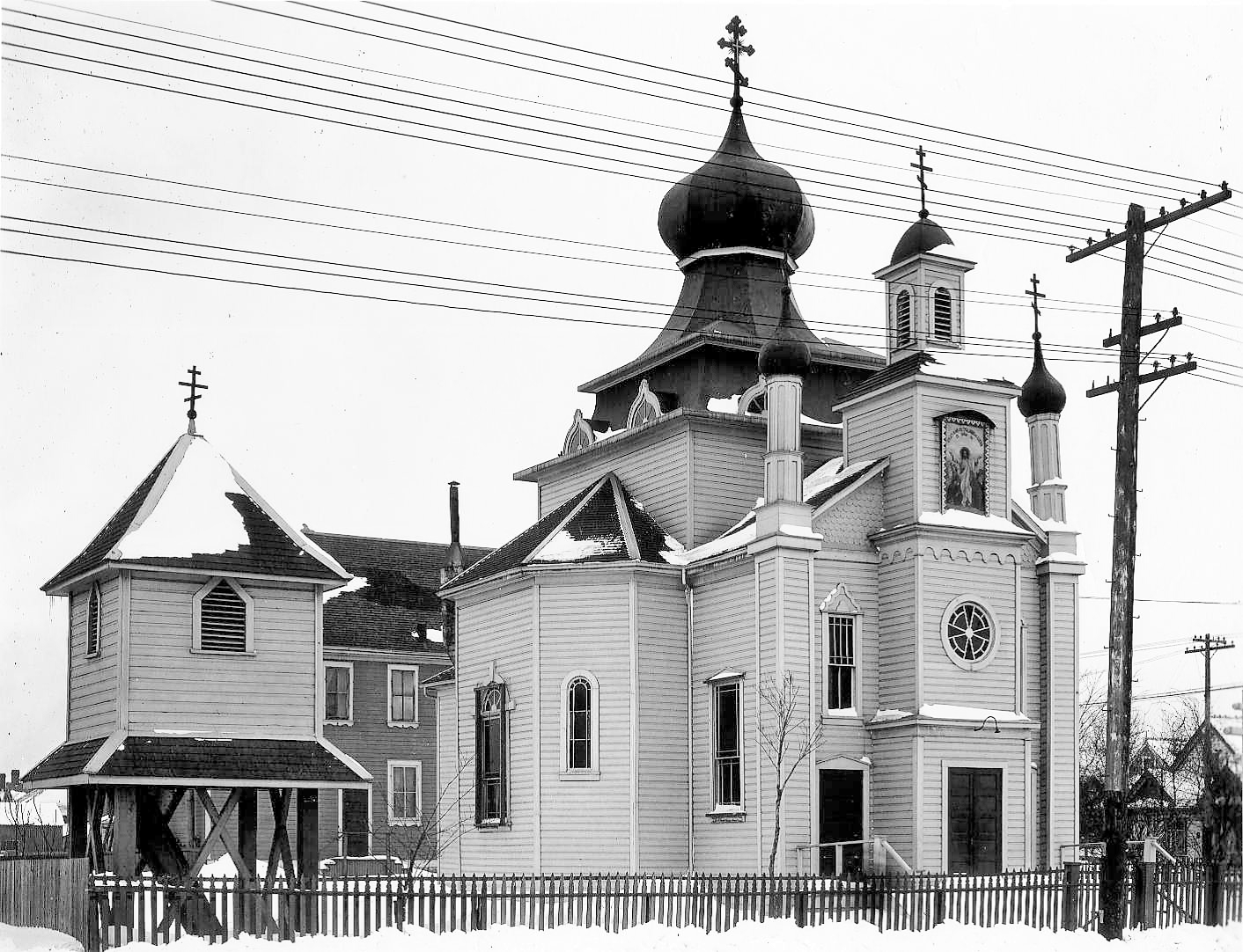
The Russian Greek Orthodox Holy Trinity Cathedral, 1905

In the same way that Seraphim excommunicated all the priests who abandoned him, he himself received word shortly of his own excommunication by the Russian Orthodox Church. It is highly likely that the person instrumental in this was Archbishop Tikon Bellavin.

On September 17, (O.S. September 4,) 1905, The Holy Trinity Russian (Greek) Orthodox church was consecrated in Winnipeg, on the corner of McKenzie Street and Manitoba Avenue, by Archbishop Tikhon, Head of the Russian Orthodox Mission in North America and soon to become Patriarch of Moscow and All Russia. Ukrainian teachers studying at the Ruthenian Training School sang at the consecration ceremony. This church was only one short city block away from the Holy Ghost Church, on Manitoba Ave. and McGregor St., which Seraphim had blessed upon first arriving in Winnipeg.

Tikon wrote in a letter dated October 1905: "The residence of our priest, Seraphim, in Winnipeg (with whom I stayed) is located beside Seraphim’s cathedral. It is difficult to describe his "cathedral": one must see it. Pillars are made from old, unfit iron pipes, and between them the space is plastered with boards and tin; crosses are made of old iron rods; ornaments and cornices are made from cardboard paper. The place resembles a kind of booth, where visiting actors and magicians give performances. On top of everything, Seraphim lives in his cathedral, where he climbs out onto the roof through the dome and, sits there on a chair, attracting large crowds of contemplatives (especially the neighboring Jews)."

After Seraphim’s departure from Winnipeg, there are records in the Ukrainian Voice newspaper of him selling Bibles to railroad workers in British Columbia. But other versions (in Russian and Polish history) have him returning to Russia. Possibly, being a larger than life figure, people mistook someone else for Seraphim and only thought they saw him in British Columbia, and these are the reports that trickled back to Winnipeg.

== Postscript ==
The success of Ustvolsky's church led to the emergence of legitimate Ukrainian Catholic and Ukrainian Orthodox churches to serve the needs of the Ukrainian pioneers. In 1912, Nykyta Budka was named the first Ukrainian Catholic bishop in Canada and in 1918, the Ukrainian Orthodox Church of Canada was formed.

== See also ==
- Seraphimite Church
- Tin Can Cathedral
- Achille Delaere
- Seraphim of Sarov

== Bibliography ==
- Bodrug, Ivan. Independent Orthodox Church: Memoirs Pertaining to the History of a Ukrainian Canadian Church in the Years 1903-1913, translators: Bodrug, Edward; Biddle, Lydia, Toronto, Ukrainian Research Foundation, 1982.
