= Nestor Dmytriw =

Ukrainian Catholic priest, author and translator

- Нестор Дмитрів
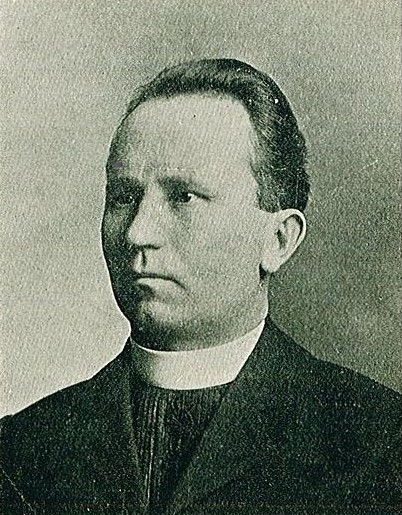
- Father Nestor Dmytriw in 1905
- Born: 1863; Utishkiv, Russian Empire (now Ukraine)
- Died: May 27, 1925 (aged 61–62); Elizabeth, New Jersey, United States
- Occupations: Priest, author, translator

Nestor Dmytriw (Note: Ukrainian: Нестор Дмитрів, romanized: Nestor Dmytriv) (1863 – May 27, 1925) was a Ukrainian Catholic priest, author, and translator. Dmytriw was born in Utishkiv, Russian Empire (now Ukraine). Shortly after his ordination by Metropolitan bishop Sylvester Sembratovych in 1894, he came to the United States in 1895 and settled in Mount Carmel, Pennsylvania. In the US, he quickly became involved with missionary work and journalism through the Jersey City, New Jersey, paper Svoboda.

== United States ==
Nestor Dmytriw was one of the so-called American Circle, a group of young seminarians who, while still in Lviv, resolved to emigrate to the United States in order to improve the religious, civic, and cultural status of the Ukrainian immigrants. Dmytriw and Cyril Genik both “shared in Joseph Oleskow’s views on the needs of the peasantry.” “In 1895, after his ordination, Dmytriw himself arrived in the United States, where he combined missionary work among the Ukrainian industrial labourers of Pennsylvania with journalism. He became associated with the first Ukrainian-language newspaper in North America, Svoboda [Liberty], which originated in Jersey City, N.J. The paper, which featured stories about the immigrant experience in the United States and Canada, was widely read in Galicia and thus became the first major link between North America and Austrian Ukraine.”

== Canada ==
In 1897, Dmytriw travelled from the United States to Canada at Joseph Oleskow’s request. Through the Ruthenian National Association, Dmytriw arrived in April 1897 to serve the spiritual needs of the Ukrainian Canadian settlers. Able to speak Ukrainian, German and English he became an interpreter for Canadian immigration. In Canadian history, Dmytriw's most notable contribution is in writing about the history and tribulations of early Ukrainian settlers.

== Missionary work on the Canadian Prairie ==
St. Michael’s Ukrainian Catholic Church, the oldest surviving Ukrainian Catholic Church in Canada, was built on the site where Father Dmytriw celebrated liturgy on April 12, 1897, shortly upon his arrival in Canada. The parishioners erected a large commemorative cross on the site, and at Dmytriw's suggestion, a log church was built in 1898. The church has since been moved from its original location in the Trembowla area, Rural Municipality of Dauphin.

In the fall of 1897, Father Dmytriw spoke up in an article in the Winnipeg Free Press defending the Ukrainian immigrants, deflecting a scathing attack on them by another newspaper. Travelling among them as he did, he was able to describe their industriousness and their well-managed homesteads.

=== The Ruthenians ===
REV. NESTOR DMYTROW TELLS OF THE ALBERTA COLONY.
Prosperity of the Early Settlers and Poverty of the Most Recent – Destitute Ones Should not Be Sent There –

The priest who has charge of the spiritual interests of the Ruthenian settlers, commonly called Galicians, Rev. Nestor Dmytrow, has returned from a visit to the settlers in Alberta. They are located fifty miles northeast of Edmonton in the vicinity of Limestone and Beaver lakes, Edna being their post office centre. They number 120 families. Rev. Mr. Dmytrow states that some of them have been working in that district four years, others three years, and some two years, besides the twenty-five families who arrived last spring. Those who have been the longest in the country he finds to be very well off, having as many as twenty-five head of cattle, forty acres under cultivation, good farm buildings and everything in splendid order. One man is erecting a large storage house worth $2000. The settlers who are now in the second year of their residence, now being some twenty families, who came out through the efforts of Prof. Oleskow, have this year reaped their first crop; they are also doing very well. Rev. Mr. Dmytrow does not, however, report so favorably of the condition of those who came last spring from Bukowina. They were not provided with means; and he hopes that the government will come to their assistance to enable them to get through their first winter in the country; indeed he says it is absolutely necessary that this should be done. They number over twenty-five families. The people are seriously hampered by their distance from market and lack means of communication with the outside world. The mail is carried to Edna only once in two weeks; and the rev. gentleman urges very strongly that at least a weekly service be granted. He thinks it would be a great advantage to the settlers if – he could, as was done in the case of Dauphin, induce one of their fellow countrymen able to speak English, to come from Pennsylvania and open a grocery store in the colony. But for the drawbacks indicated he thinks that the colony in question would be the best of all the Ruthenian colonies; taking things as they are, however, he earnestly advises that no more destitute families be sent to that part. The remoteness of the locality and the lack of means of communication render it impossible for poor people to find employment by which they can earn a little money. A priest is expected to come from Galicia this coming winter to take charge of the Alberta colony under the Roman Catholic bishop of St. Albert.

Dmytriw’s records showed 15 families, with children, 78 persons, were settled in Trembowla, the oldest Ukrainian settlement in the vicinity of Dauphin in 1897. In Winnipeg, the population was 200, some spending their winter in the Immigration Hall, waiting to leave for their homesteads in spring, while others had decided to stay in the city and were looking for employment. As the first Ukrainian priest to visit the prairies, Dmytriw began organizing the first Ukrainian religious groups in the area.

While in Alberta in 1897, Dmytriw was informed by Bishop Legal that, “It would be impossible to have two Catholic churches in Canada.” Dmytriw advised the Ukrainian immigrants to be wary of the French clergy, when Legal “secured land for the Ukrainian Catholic Church in Edna-Star, then tried to have it registered with his episcopal corporation without consulting the settlers.”

When living in Canada, Dmytriw worked at the immigration bureau in Winnipeg. This helped him in his religious endeavors, giving him the funds to travel throughout the western provinces. The Ukrainian settlers were poor and could not help him in this respect.

== Departure ==
Dmytriw was only in Canada until August 1898. During his stay, he organized the first Ukrainian parishes in Trembowla, Manitoba, Stuartburn, Manitoba, and Edna, Alberta and was an advocate of a separate Ukrainian Catholic Church in Canada. This was initially opposed by the Canadian Catholic hierarchy, especially Archbishop Adélard Langevin, but came to fruition with the appointment of Nykyta Budka as apostolic exarch for Ukrainian Canadian Catholics.

Father Nestor Dmytriw died on May 27, 1925, in Elizabeth, New Jersey.

== See also ==
- Achille Delaere

== Bibliography ==
- Martynowych, Orest T. Ukrainians in Canada: The Formative Period, 1891-1924. Canadian Institute of Ukrainian Studies Press, University of Alberta, Edmonton, 1991.
- Marunchak, Michael, H. The Ukrainian Canadians: A History, Winnipeg, Ottawa: Ukrainian Free Academy of Sciences, 1970.
- Gerus, Oleh W. “Nestor Dmytriw”, Dictionary of Canadian Biography.
- Subtelny, Orest. Ukrainians In North America, An Illustrated History, University of Toronto Press, Toronto, 1991.
