= Byzantine Rite Christianity in Canada =

Byzantine Rite Christianity in Canada refers to all Eastern Orthodox, Eastern Catholic, and independent groups in Canada who use the Byzantine Rite.

== History ==
It is unclear when Eastern Christians first settled in Canada. Russian Orthodox missionaries from Alaska definitely traversed parts of present-day Canada (they reached Fort Ross, California in 1812), but they do not seem to have created any lasting missions. It is clear that by the 1890s Eastern Christian immigrants began arriving in Western Canada from Eastern Europe.

In 1891, Ukrainian immigrants began to settle in Canada, and they were either Ukrainian Catholic (mostly from Galicia) or Eastern Orthodox (mostly from Bukovina a region under the Romanian Orthodox Church). Very few priests accompanied the settlers, however, "out of deference to the jurisdictional claims of the Russian Orthodox Church" over North America among the Orthodox, and because in 1894 the Catholic Sacred Congregation for the Propagation of the Faith issued a decree forbidding married priests in North America; consequently there are a shortage of Ukrainian priests in Canada. In 1896, a group of Russophile Ukrainians from Wostok, Northwest Territories wrote to the Russian Bishop of Alaska asking for a priest. In 1897, the first recorded Orthodox service was held in Canada at Wostok. Subsequently, Russian Orthodox priests were active in the Ukrainian community, and attracted many converts. The Greek Catholic church's few priests often clashed with Latin administrators such as Bishop Legal. An independent movement separate from the Catholic and Orthodox was founded in Winnipeg around 1903. This movement, backed by the Presbyterian Church, became the Seraphimite Church, and set up the Tin Can Cathedral in Winnipeg.

After 1895, Romanians also began arriving in numbers to the Canadian West, and in 1902 St. Nicholas Romanian Orthodox Church was built in Regina, NWT; it remains standing as one of the oldest buildings in Regina and the oldest Romanian church in North America.

By the turn of the 20th century, immigration from traditionally Eastern Christian countries included not only settlers moving to Western Canada looking for farmland but also those going to Eastern cities, primarily Toronto. The first Byzantine Rite church in that city was the Greek Orthodox Community of St. George, founded in 1909. The first immigrant of Greek origin is reportedly Peter Constantinides who came to Toronto in 1864 to attend the Medical School at the University of Toronto. On May 21, 1909, a meeting was held at the Y.M.C.A. attended by about 200 Greeks living in Toronto. They constituted themselves into a corporate body identified as the "St. George Greek Orthodox Community of Ontario". This was followed by Sts. Cyril and Methody Macedono-Bulgarian Church, founded one year later in 1910 and the Russian Orthodox Church of Christ the Saviour in 1915.

The coming of World War I dramatically affected the Eastern churches in Canada. The Russian Church lost the prestige of government support and in fact came under suspicion of being controlled by the Bolsheviks. Non-Russian ethnic groups set up their own churches in North America. In 1921, Serbian Orthodox parishes in the United States and Canada were reorganized into the Serbian Orthodox Diocese of America and Canada. The Russian church split into the Russian Orthodox Church Outside Russia, the Russian Orthodox Greek Catholic Church in America, the Russian Orthodox Church in America, and some parishes who maintained links with Moscow.

In June 1918, a group of disgruntled Ukrainian Catholic laypeople met to create the Ukrainian Greek Orthodox Brotherhood, which became the Ukrainian Greek Orthodox Church of Canada.

== Sources ==
- Vuković, Sava (1998). History of the Serbian Orthodox Church in America and Canada 1891-1941. Kragujevac: Kalenić.

== See also ==
Achille Delaere
