= Hanna Arsenych-Baran =

Ukrainian writer (1970–2021)

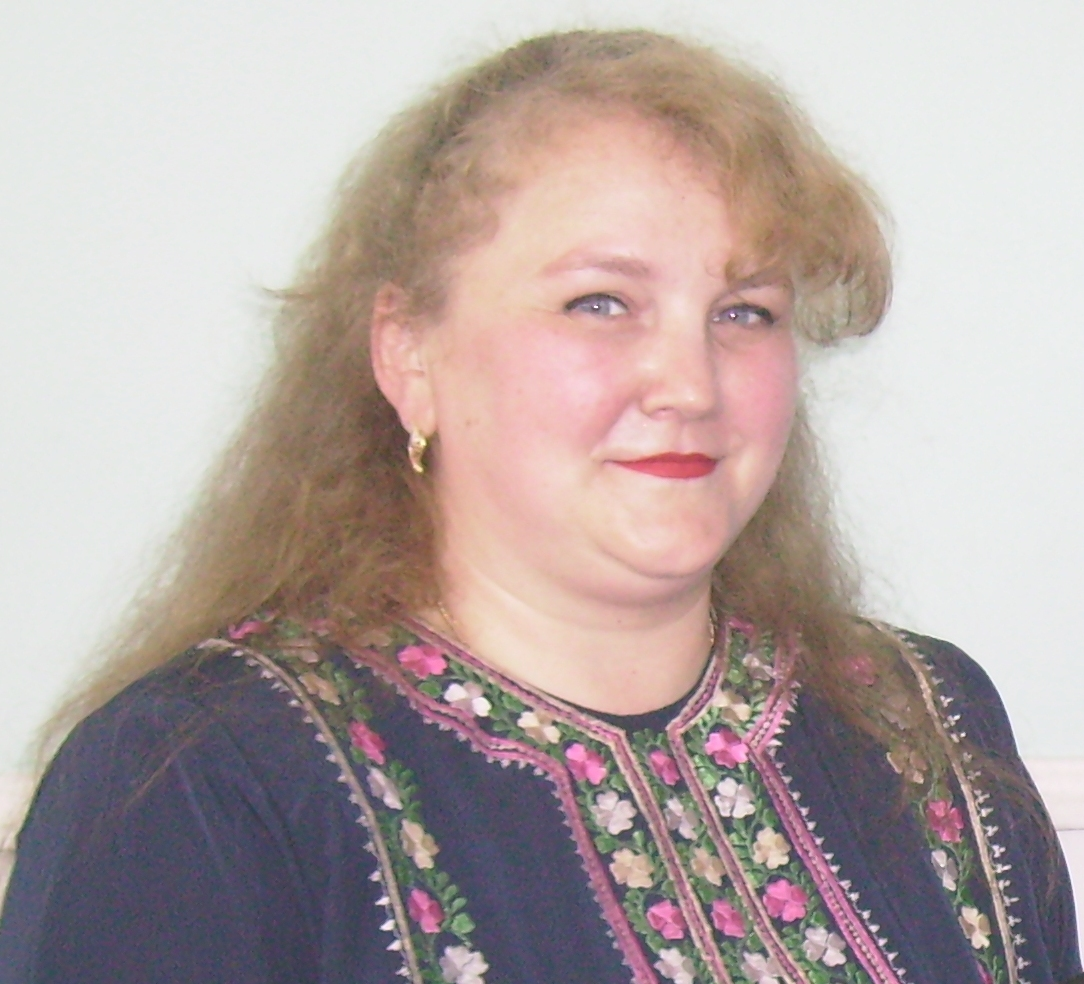
- Arsenych-Baran in 2006
- Born: Hanna Vasylivna Arsenych-Baran; 26 June 1970; Nyzhnii Bereziv, Kosiv Raion, Ivano-Frankivsk Oblast
- Died: 1 April 2021 (aged 50)
- Occupations: Novelist; Poet; Teacher; Writer
- Spouse: Myron Baran
- Children: 2

Hanna Vasylivna Arsenych-Baran (Ukrainian: Баран Ганна Василівна; 26 June 1970 – 1 April 2021) was a Ukrainian novelist, poet, school teacher and writer of prose. She was the author of more than a hundred textbooks on the Ukrainian language and literature as well as multiple dictionaries. Arsenych-Baran was a teacher who taught the Ukrainian language and literature in Chernihiv and educated students at the K. D. Ushinsky South Ukrainian National Pedagogical University. She won the Mykhailo Kotsyubynsky Regional Prize and the Leonid Glibov Regional Prize. Arsenych-Baran was a member of the National Writers' Union of Ukraine, become chair of its Chernihiv regional organisation in November 2016.

== Early life ==
On 26 June 1970, Arsenych-Baran was born in the village of Nyzhnii Bereziv, Kosiv Raion, Ivano-Frankivsk Oblast. Her ancestors from both sides of her family had worked in business, were doctors, local historians, poets, priests and scientists; some were members of the Organization of Ukrainian Nationalists and the Ukrainian Insurgent Army. Arsenych-Baran graduated from high school with a gold medal, and she was a 1992 graduate of the Faculty of Philology of the Vasyl Stefanyk Precarpathian National University.

== Career ==
Arsenych-Baran's career commenced as a teacher of Ukrainian language and literature in the schools of Kosiv Raion. In 1998, she relocated to Chernihiv with members of her family, and worked at the Lyceum No.15. She received an invitation to work as an methodologist in the Department of Social Sciences and Humanities. Arsenych-Baran went on to be appointed as a senior lecturer at the Department of Philology and Methods of Teaching of the K. D. Ushinsky South Ukrainian National Pedagogical University that she led from 2015. She became a member of the National Writers' Union of Ukraine in 1998. Arsenych-Baran was elected chair of the National Writers' Union of Ukraine's Chernihiv regional organisation in November 2016.

Arsenych-Baran published her first collection of poetry, Towel on Viburnum, in 1997 and then authored a second poetry collection entitled Cherry Music the following year. In 2001, she published the collection of poetry Blooming Hawthorn and the book of prose Under the Apples of Paradise in the same year. Arsenych-Baran wrote the prose book On Monday everything will be different and the poetry collection Trembling Hyacinths two years later. In 2005, she followed up with the publication of the poetry collection Hope in the Spring, the book of prose As the moon rises and the novel Quiet Street of the Evening City. Arsenych-Baran authored Sweet Words of prose in 2010, compiled the anthology of 3,000 Ukrainian Christian verse prayers from the 19th to early 21st centuries called Prayer raises the sky the following year, as well as the novels Muska and Rejoice, Bride! in 2018. She compiled the Dictionary of Ukrainian-Russian interlingual homonyms in 2020, a collection of nearly 4,000 words in Russian and Ukrainian which she had worked on for half a decade.

She also wrote a number of songs for some composers. Arsenych-Baran was named a laurete of the Mykhailo Kotsyubynsky Regional Prize in September 2006 for her work on the novel Quiet Street of the Evening City, as well as the Leonid Glibov Regional Prize. Her works have been translated into Armenian, Belarusian and English. Arsenych-Baran was the publisher of more than a hundred textbooks on the Ukrainian language and literature. She also published multiple dictionaries, and she was the author of fourteen books of prose and poetry. Arsenych-Baran's works were also published in local magazines.

== Personal life ==
Arsenych-Baran was married to the rector of the Friday Church, Myron Baran, whom she met at university. The couple had a child. On the late evening of 1 April 2021, she died suddenly of COVID-19 complications following her being discharged from hospital with improvement to her condition a day earlier. Arsenych-Baran's funeral service and burial was held two days later.

== Legacy ==
Chernihiv Oblast Council said that Arsenych-Baran had "enriched the creative treasury of Chernihiv and Ukraine with interesting and profound novels, a number of poetic and prose works, actively engaged in scientific and methodological activities."
