= Ivan Babii =

Ukrainian educator (1893–1934)

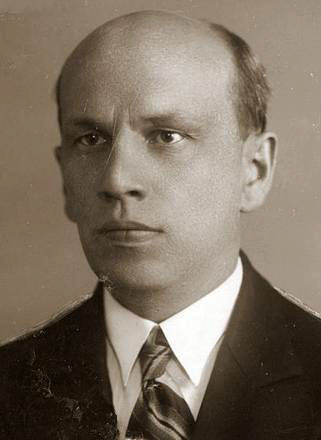
- Born: March 5, 1893; Dobromirka, Austria–Hungary
- Died: July 25, 1934 (aged 41); Lwów, Second Polish Republic
- Cause of death: Assassination by gunshot
- Occupations: Educator, military officer
- Known for: Organizing the "Ukrainian Youth for Christ" festival

Ivan Babii (Ukrainian: Іван Бабій; March 5, 1893 – July 25, 1934) was a Ukrainian educator and military officer. He was one of the main organizers of the "Ukrainian Youth for Christ" festival and a proponent of peaceful coexistence between Ukrainians and Poles in Galicia as an integral part of Poland. Babii was assassinated on the orders of the Organization of Ukrainian Nationalists (OUN).

== Biography ==
Ivan Babii was born on March 5, 1893, in the village of Dobromirka (now in Zbarazh district of Ternopil region, Ukraine) into a peasant family.

Babii graduated in 1911 from a high school in Tarnopol, then studied classical philology at the Jan Kazimierz University in Lwów. Following the start of World War I in 1914, he was called into the Austro-Hungarian Army, where he served in the Ukrainian Sich Riflemen. In 1918–1919, Babii fought against Poland in the Ukrainian Galician Army and in 1920 participated as an officer of the Ukrainian People's Army in the Kiev offensive of the joint Polish-Ukrainian forces.

Later, Babii became a principal of a high school in Brzeżany, then, in 1931, took the post of principal of a Ukrainian high school in Lwów. He organized the Youth for Christ festival in western Ukraine. Babii openly criticized the Organization of Ukrainian Nationalists. He prevented his students from distributing OUN leaflets.

The revolutionary tribunal of the Organization of Ukrainian Nationalists sentenced Babii to death for collaborating with Polish authorities. On July 27, 1934, an OUN militant murdered him in Lviv. As it turned out, Babii was assigned police protection, and when the attacker realized that he would not be able to escape, he tried to shoot himself. In the hospital, the militant regained consciousness and confessed that he was a member of the OUN and his name was Mykhailo Tsar, originally from Pozdymyr. On August 17, the killer died of his wound. The assassination was publicly condemned by the Ukrainian Archbishop Andrey Sheptytsky.

== Bibliography ==
- Andrzej Chojnowski, Jan Bruski − Ukraina, Warsaw 2006, ISBN 978-83-7436-039-5
