= Makarii Marchenko =

Russian Orthodox priest

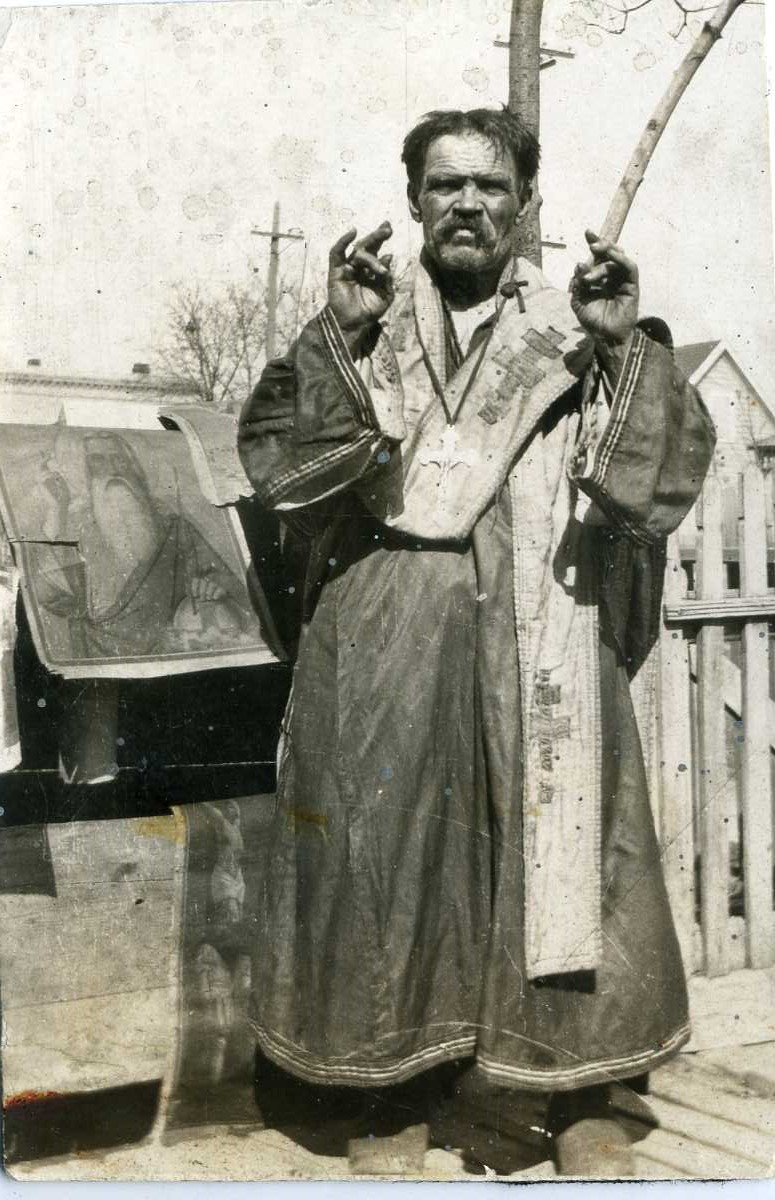
Makarii Marchenko

Monk Makarii Marchenko was a Russian Orthodox priest who arrived with Bishop Seraphim in Winnipeg in April 1903. He always dressed in an assortment of vestments which made him practically unidentifiable as to which church and religion he represented.

== Introduction ==
Makarii Marchenko's date of birth was 1864. He was stocky, of short stature, swarthy, and gloomy. Before coming to Canada, he had spent time on Mount Athos, and in Constantinople, and talked with knowledge about these places. In 1893, Marchenko was a priest with the ambassadorial staff of the Russian church in Rome.

== Arrival in Winnipeg ==
Marchenko's arrival in Winnipeg is described by Bodrug: "There (at the Immigration Building upon first arriving) he (Seraphim) served mass with the assistance of the monk-priest, Makarii Marchenko, who had earlier fled from Athos and travelled through the main cities of Asia Minor, Southern Europe and South America. Father Makarii had met Seraphim in Yonkers, near New York, and from then on served as Seraphim’s assistant, even though Seraphim often publicly called Makarii a fool. Makarii was an extremely simple man, very slovenly, and not quite right in the head." Still, Seraphim let him serve in his church, and his calling Marchenko a fool may have had a deeper spiritual meaning than just abuse.

== Seraphim’s Assistant ==
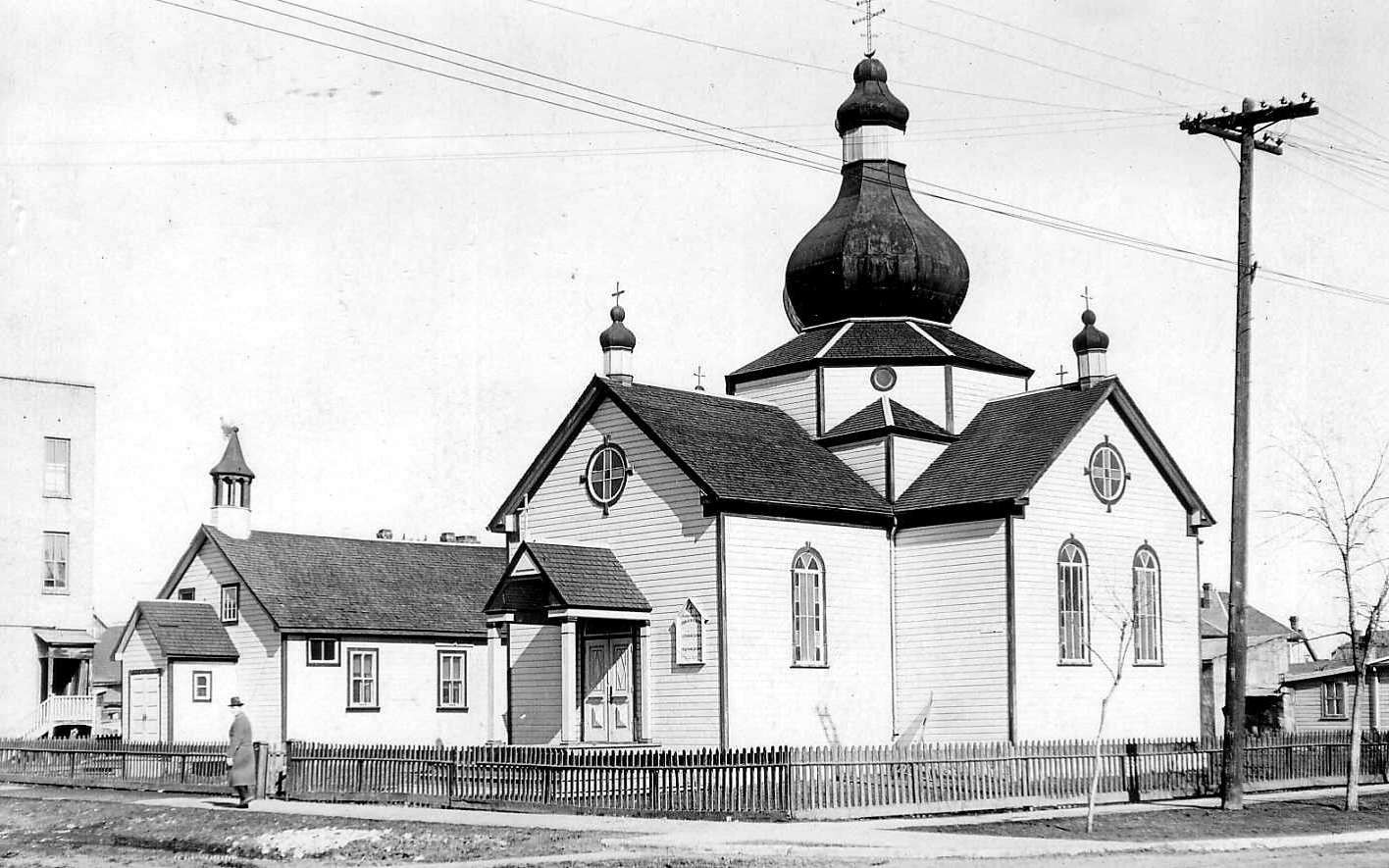
Left: Holy Ghost Church, 1903; Right: Independent Greek Church of Our Saviour, built later.

Seraphim and his assistant served mass at the Holy Ghost Church on the corner of McGregor Street and Pritchard Avenue on 13 December 1903, a small frame building on the east side of McGregor Street between Manitoba and Pritchard Avenues, blessing it and officially opening it for worship.

== A Seraphimite Service ==
Ivan Bodrug (at this time a priest in the Seraphimite church, along with Ivan Negrich) describes in his memoir how a mill that he had built for himself in Sifton, Manitoba was consecrated by Bishop Seraphim accompanied by Makarii Marchenko. "On Sunday morning hundreds of people appeared in Sifton. (Word had got around quickly that an Orthodox priest was to visit the area.) Seraphim and Makarii stayed in the mill from dawn to dusk, confessing the sinners. Negrich also arrived from his school. Negrich and I had never made any effort to hear confessions, and Father Makarii was glad of this, since it gave him an opportunity to make a few dollars from the confessors. Father Makarii was very tight with a penny, and constantly speculated where he could get a free meal. He had a hearty appetite, nor was he one to 'toss a drink over his shoulder', and so with both hands he showered blessings on all people, good and bad, while whispering quotations from the Bible. The Bishop’s service began with Negrich’s and my assistance. It was natural that my mill would have to be cleansed of evil spirits, and therefore the mill had to be consecrated, which Seraphim did, precisely according to the Missal. However, as Seraphim knew all the ritual by heart, he did not even glance at the Missal. Father Makarii, glad that Seraphim did not call on him to assist with the service, stationed himself behind the altar, where he munched noisily on wafers, drinking them down with wine. During the service, Bachinsky’s choir from Ethelbert sang, with fine cantors participating."

== Another Turn ==
Marchenko's life in Winnipeg soon took a decided turn. "Shocked by their bishop’s indiscriminate ordination of clergy, his drinking sprees and the ludicrous actions of his simple minded assistant, Makarii Marchenko, the more intelligent priests led by John Bodrug persuaded Seraphim to go to Russia in the fall of 1903 to obtain sanction of the Holy Synod for his church." In his absence, Bodrug hijacked the church, which Seraphim returned to discover, proceeded to excommunicate the mutineers, was himself excommunicated by the Russian Orthodox Church, and then left. "His successor, Makarii, completed the sham, proclaiming himself 'Arch-Patriarch, Arch-Pope, Arch-Tsar, Arch-Hetman and Arch-Prince' and excommunicating the Pope and the Holy Synod."

== Rural Service - Post Seraphimite Church ==
In the early days, farmhouse doors on the prairies were not locked. There is a story of Makarii Marchenko barging into one home without knocking and sprinkling everything and everybody with holy water, and requesting to be fed. For two dollars, he was prepared to ordain a student in the house into the priesthood.

Behind the altar, in a church in Saskatchewan, he carved his name with a date. Also, in a parish in Alberta, a similar carving with his name and date were found. He travelled as far north as Gimli, serving there at St. Michael's Ukrainian Catholic Church.

It was said of him that of church work he had no preparedness or aptitude.

== Later life ==
Jacob Maydanyk (1891-1984) owned the Providence Church Goods Store at 710 Main Street next to the C.P.R. underpass and across the street from the old Royal Alexander Hotel. Maydanyk said that Marchenko frequented his store in later years, and described him as someone playing the beggar inviting kindness towards himself. One story that Maydanyk was told was of Marchenko visiting a house where a lady needed to go to a store. She had a child who was asleep and whom she did not want to wake. Marchenko told her, "Go, and let the child sleep, and I’ll sit and keep an eye on him. Don’t worry, I’m not crazy!"

In these later years, Marchenko would sell old newspapers and old books for money. He worked mainly in Greek Catholic churches. He would barge into church gatherings and make a fuss, until he was fed, and only then could he be persuaded to leave quietly. Even Bishop Budka tolerated him. Later, Orthodox priests had no trouble with him either.

== Epilogue ==
In Winnipeg, Marchenko sometimes served at St Michael's Ukrainian Orthodox Church, on 110 Disraeli Street. Towards the end of his life, he became blind. His mind seemed to wander. Despite his wandering mind, and his blindness, he gave a sense under it all of someone blessed or enlightened. Perceptively, Maydanyk noted that, though we do not know why Marchenko left the Russian church to begin with, no matter how difficult life became for him outside of it, he never returned to its fold.

He died in 1952. He was buried in Libau, Manitoba.

== Holy Fool ==
Some have suggested that Makarii Marchenko behavior might be understood through the eastern Christian role of the Holy Fool.

== See also ==
- Tin Can Cathedral
- Stefan Ustvolsky

== Bibliography ==
- Bodrug, Ivan. Independent Orthodox Church: Memoirs Pertaining to the History of a Ukrainian Canadian Church in the Years 1903-1913, translators: Bodrug, Edward; Biddle, Lydia, Toronto, Ukrainian Research Foundation, 1982.
- Ewanchuk, Michael. The Michael Ewanchuk Fonds, PC 96 (A.02-19), Box 21, Folder 7, The University of Manitoba Archives [text in Ukrainian].
- Gaer, Joseph. The Lore of the Old Testament. New York: Macmillan, 1923.
- Ivanov, S. A. "Holy Fools in Byzantium and Beyond." Oxford: Oxford University Press, 2006.
- Kuchmij, Halya. Laughter in my Soul, An NFB Film, 1983.
- Martynowych, Orest T. The Seraphimite, Independent Greek, Presbyterian and United Churches, umanitoba.ca/...canadian.../05_The_Seraphimite_Independent_Greek_Presbyterian_and_United_Churches.pdf –
