= Lendelede =

- Municipality
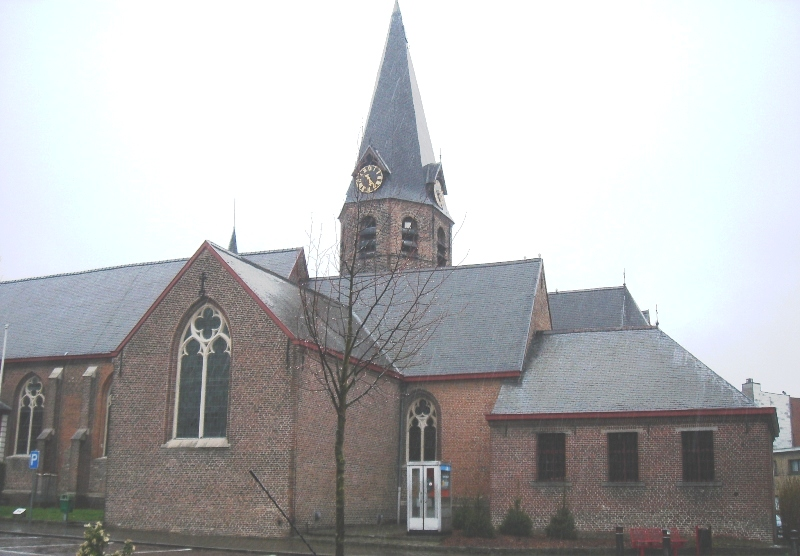
- Church of Saint Blaise (Sint-Blasius)

- Flag Coat of arms

- Location of Lendelede in West-Flanders
- Interactive map of Lendelede
- Location in Belgium
- Coordinates: 50°53′N 03°14′E
- Country: Belgium
- Community: Flemish Community
- Region: Flemish Region
- Province: West Flanders
- Arrondissement: Kortrijk

Government
  - Mayor: Carine Dewaele (CD&V)
  - Governing party: CD&V

Area
  - Total: 13.27 km^{2} (5.12 sq mi)

Population (2019-01-01)
  - Total: 5,747
  - Density: 433.1/km^{2} (1,122/sq mi)
- Postal codes: 8860
- NIS code: 34025
- Area codes: 051, 056
- Website: www.lendelede.be

Lendelede (Dutch pronunciation: [ˈlɛndəˌleːdə]; West Flemish: Lendlee) is a municipality located in the Belgian province of West Flanders. The municipality comprises only the town of Lendelede proper. On January 1, 2006, Lendelede had a total population of 5,399. The total area is 13.15 km^{2} which gives a population density of 411 inhabitants per km^{2}.

== History ==
While the settlement's true founding may date back to the Roman era, the first documentary evidence of Lendelede's existence dates back to 1078.

== People from Lendelede ==
- Ludovicus Baekelandt
- Achille Delaere
- Jan Kuyckx
- Noël Dejonckheere

== Gallery ==
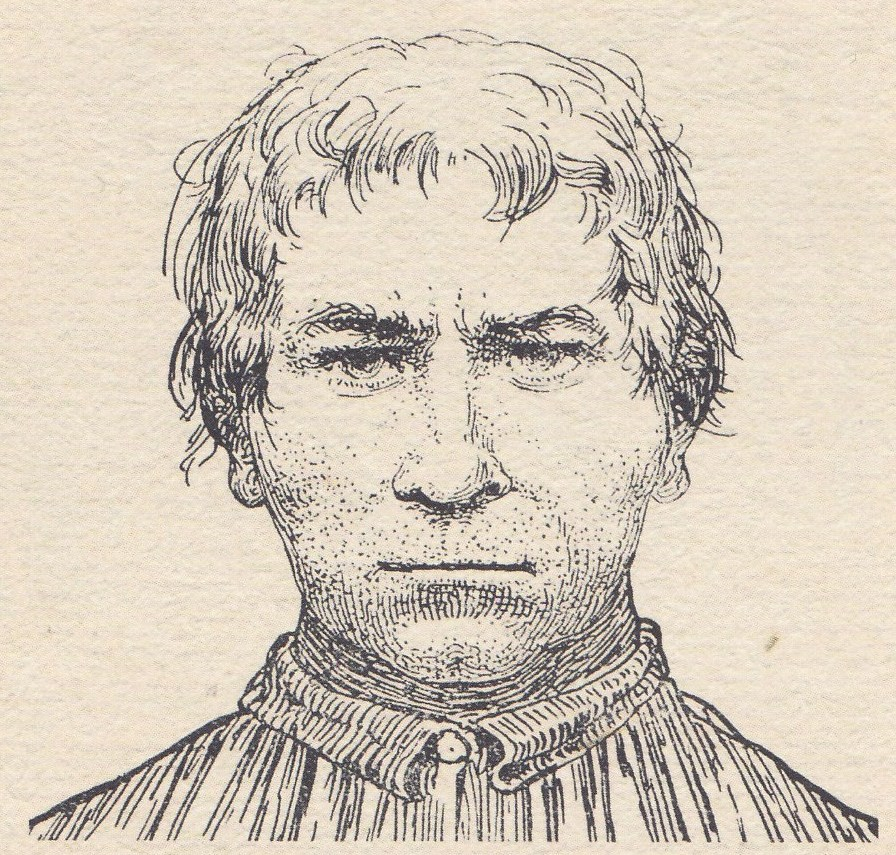
Ludovicus Baekelandt, 1774–1803, highwayman

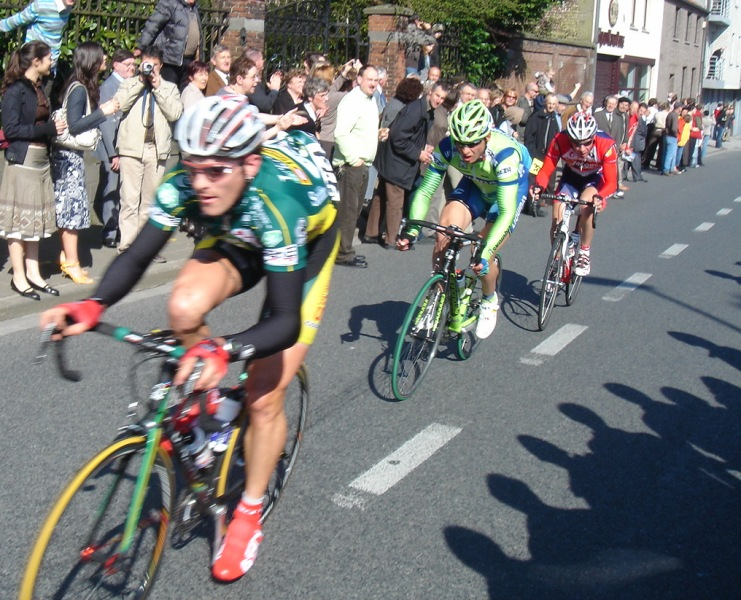
2007 Tour of Flanders through Lendelede with Jan Kuyckx (Landbouwkrediet); Aleksandr Kuschynski (Liquigas); Evert Verbist (- Topsport Vlaanderen)
