= Achille Delaere =

Flemish missionary priest

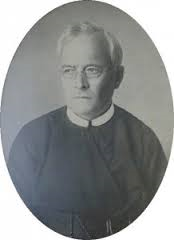
- Born: April 17, 1868; Lendelede, Belgium
- Died: July 12, 1939 (aged 71); Yorkton, Saskatchewan, Canada

Achille Delaere (born 1868, Lendelede, Belgium) was a Flemish priest who served on the Canadian prairies. He was one of the founders and organizers of the Ukrainian Catholic Church, with the Byzantine-Ukrainian rite, for Ukrainian immigrants in Canada.

== Biography ==
Achille Delaere was the son of a farmer, and since his father needed help, worked on his father's farm. As a young man Achille joined the Redemptorists in 1889 and was ordained in 1896. Growing up on a farm, ordination did not change the disposition Delaere had acquired for rough and ready circumstances. His brother was a priest teacher in Bruges. Achille Delaere was frank with people, telling them what he thought of them. Even Canada's Apostolic Delegate Andrea Cassulo learned about Delaere's frankness. Delaere once told him that only liars and scoundrels wrote to complain to the Apostolic Delegate. The Delegate replied with a smile that sometimes Bishops and Archbishops also wrote to the Apostolic Delegate.

In the summer of 1898, Father Delaere was recruited as one of three Belgian Redemptorist monks by French-Canadian Archbishop Langevin who visited the Provincial Superior of the Belgian Redemptorist province at Brussels asking for help with the large immigrant population from Eastern Europe arriving on the Canadian Prairies. Father Delaere spent a year in the Galician town of Tuchów in Galicia, learning Polish, before leaving for Canada to minister to the Polish and Ukrainian immigrants in the Brandon-Shoal Lake district of Manitoba.

He was sent to Canada on the Scotsman out of Liverpool. It wrecked off Belle Isle; sixteen people died. Delaere survived and continued his journey to Brandon, arriving October 11, 1899. He was welcomed by his fellow Redemptorists as the Apostle to the Poles.

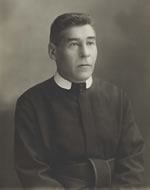
Father Platonides Filas (1864–1920)

Around 1903, Delaere and other Redemptorists working in the Brandon area began to visit the Yorkton area once a month. Delaere himself was stunned by the amount of work required and reported that the territory was actually half the size of Belgium with only thirty to forty English families and was entirely neglected by any other Catholic clergy since the Oblates had moved out. Serafimists, Russian Orthodox priests, and Protestants had all established themselves in the area. The Redemptorists reported seventeen Protestant ministers in the Yorkton region. Delaere immediately begged for help, encouraged French Canadian seminarians to study different languages, and brought in Father Kryzhanowsky, a Basilian monk, to help him in the various colonies. Father Achille Delaere also worked closely with Father Platonides Filas, the Provincial of the Basilians in Canada.

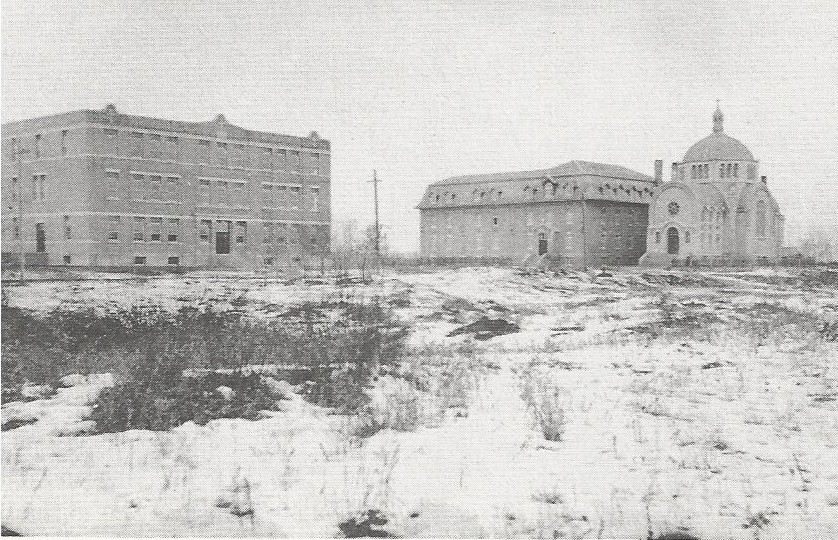
St. Joseph's College, monastery of the Redemptorist Fathers and Ukrainian Catholic church, Yorkton, Saskatchewan, 1920.

Delaere became aware that the majority of Galicians attending his services were actually Eastern-rite Ruthenians. In the struggle between the Eastern church and the Latin Church, the immigrants to whom Delaere ministered were being alienated by the unmarried Roman Catholic priests and their Latin rite. No matter how the Roman Catholic church tried to keep them in its fold, it was only a transfer to the Eastern rite that had a chance. Delaere faced increasing hostility, defections, and the lack of help from Archbishop Langevin. He established the Redemptorists' monastery in Yorkton on January 12, 1904, to care for the Galicians. It still exists, as St. Gerard's parish, a Roman Catholic parish in the Archdiocese of Regina. Finally, on March 9, 1906, Delaere obtained permission from Pope Pius X to practice the Byzantine Rite. Father Delaere celebrated Mass in the Byzantine Rite for the first time on September 26, 1906. The other Belgian priests soon followed suit.

Unable to pronounce his name properly, the Ukrainians called Delaere: Father Dollar. John Bodrug in his memoir writes a first hand account of Delaere: "In Sifton, there had been built a small Greek Catholic Church, which was occasionally visited by Father Zaklynsky, but more often served by Father Dollar. Delaere had learned to read mass in Old Church Slavonic and he dressed according to Greek ritual, but he delivered his sermons in Polish."

As for his language skills and his knowledge of the Eastern rite, his closest associates declared that he never learned French properly and at best was mediocre in Ukrainian, but his zeal and his capacity for work made him indispensable to his superiors even though they did not care for his rustic ways.

Father Nestor Dmytriw was the first to advocate for a separate Ukrainian Catholic church in Canada in 1897. In 1911, at Delaere's urging, Archbishop Langevin finally submitted to the idea of the appointment of a Ukrainian Catholic bishop, and informed the Vatican of his change of heart. "In May 1912, Delaere was summoned to confer with Pius X, and on July 15, after consulting the Ukrainian Catholic hierarchy in Galicia, Rome appointed Fr. Nykyta Budka bishop of Ukrainian Catholics in Canada." At the same time Fr. Nykyta Budka was appointed Titular Bishop of Patara and was consecrated by Archbishop Andrey Sheptytsky OSBM of Lviv and the co-consecrators Bishop Konstantyn Czechowicz (Eparchy of Przemyśl) and Bishop Hryhory Khomyshyn (Eparchy Stanislaviv) on 13 October 1912.

Having been instrumental in bringing Budka into Canada, Delaere now found himself having to deal with him. There were moments of doubt, when Delaere was disconcerted by Budka's "cold neutrality", and counselled by those around him to abandon the Ukrainians in Canada, but he remained steadfast.

Father Delaere served on the Canadian prairies from the time of his arrival in 1899, for forty years, until his death in 1939.

== See also ==
- Tin Can Cathedral
- Nestor Dmytriw

== Bibliography ==
- Bodrug, Ivan. Independent Orthodox Church: Memoirs Pertaining to the History of a Ukrainian Canadian Church in the Years 1903–1913, translators: Bodrug, Edward; Biddle, Lydia, Toronto, Ukrainian Research Foundation, 1982.
- Laverdure, Paul. Achille Delaere and the Origins of the Ukrainian Catholic Church in Western Canada (PDF).
- Martynowych, Orest T. Ukrainians in Canada: The Formative Period, 1891–1924. Canadian Institute of Ukrainian Studies Press, University of Alberta, Edmonton, 1991.
