= Nyzhnii Bereziv =

Rural locality in Ivano-Frankivsk Oblast, Ukraine

Nyzhnii Bereziv Нижній Березів
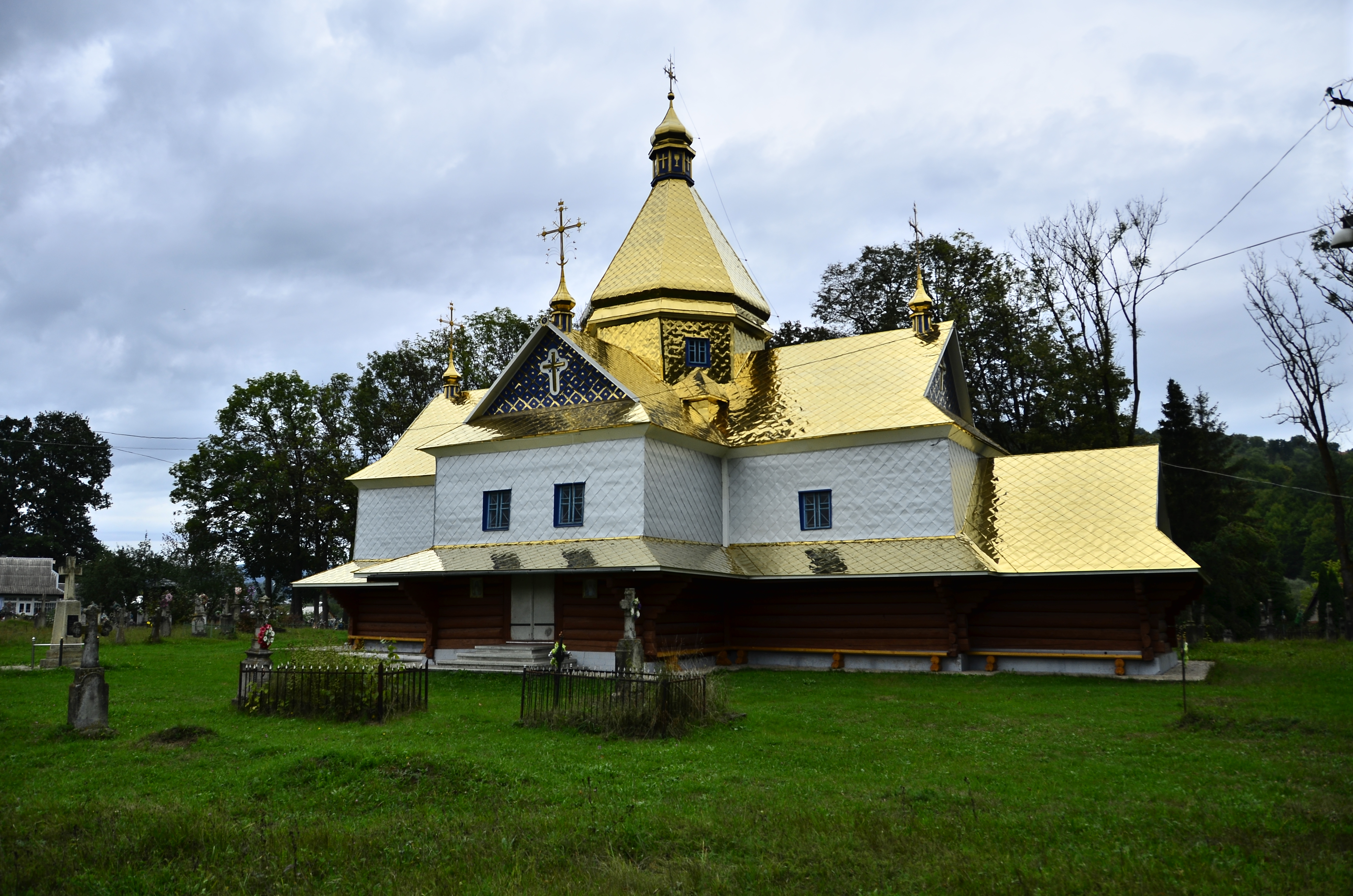
- Saint Nicholas church

- Location in Ivano-Frankivsk Oblast
- Coordinates: 48°24′9″N 24°51′7″E
- Country: Ukraine
- Oblast: Ivano-Frankivsk Oblast
- Raion: Kosiv Raion
- Hromada: Yabluniv urban hromada
- Time zone: UTC+2 (EET)
  - Summer (DST): UTC+3 (EEST)
- Postal code: 78615

Nyzhnii Bereziv (Ukrainian: Нижній Березів; Polish: Berezów Niżny) is a village in the Yabluniv settlement hromada of the Kosiv Raion of Ivano-Frankivsk Oblast in Ukraine.

== History ==
The first written mention of the village was in 1412.

On 19 July 2020, as a result of the administrative-territorial reform and liquidation of the Kosiv Raion, the village became part of the Kosiv Raion.

== Religion ==
- St. Nicholas church (1844, wooden, architectural monument of local importance, UGCC)
- Orthodox monastery (destroyed by Tatars in the 17th century)

== Notable residents ==
- Cyril Genik (Kyrylo Henyk; 1857–1925), Ukrainian-Canadian immigration agent
- Ivan Malkovych (born 1961), Ukrainian poet and publisher

Ivan Franko visited the village many times, writing his short story "Na vershku" and collecting folk songs. Also, Yaroslav Halan lived in the village, Bohdan Lepkyi and Volodymyr Kubijovyč had vacations there, and the Krushelnytskyi family gave concerts.

== Sources ==
- "Berezów (2) Niżny, pow. kołomyjski". Geographical Dictionary of the Kingdom of Poland (in Polish). 1. Warszawa: Kasa im. Józefa Mianowskiego. 1880. p. 142.
