= Cyril Genik =

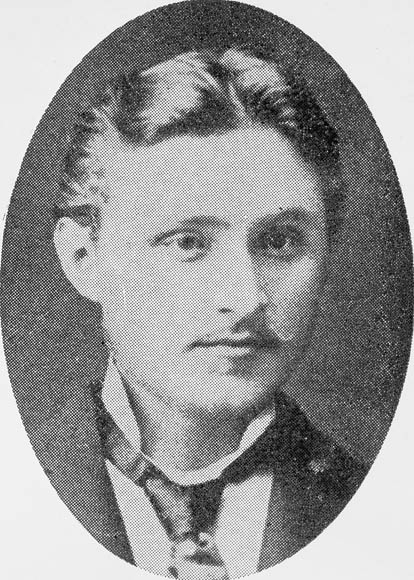
- Born: 1857; Bereziv Nyzhnii, Galicia
- Died: February 12, 1925 (aged 67–68); Winnipeg, Manitoba, Canada
- Occupation: immigration agent

Cyril Ivanovich Genik (Ukrainian: Кирило Іванович Геник, 1857 – February 12, 1925) was a Ukrainian-Canadian immigration agent. He is a Person of National Historic Significance.

== Biography ==
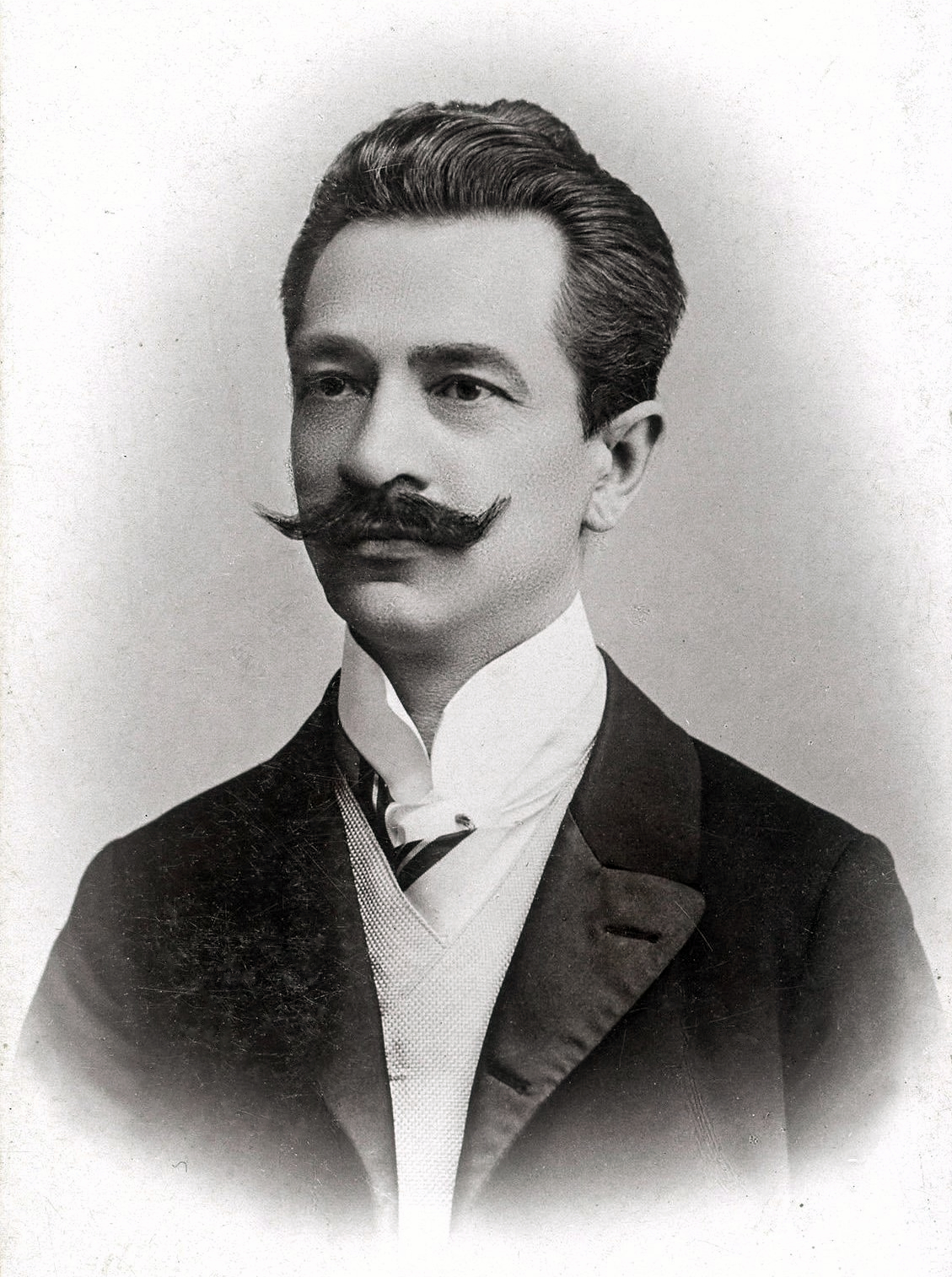
Joseph Oleskiw (1860 – 1903)

Cyril Ivanovich Genik was born in 1857 in Bereziv Nyzhnii, Galicia, to father Ivan Genyk, a village mayor, and Ann Pertsovych. Genik began his studies at Kolomyja, before moving to what is now Ivano-Frankivsk to complete his teaching education. He completed his baccalaureate in Lviv before being appointed as a teacher in 1879 in Nadvirna county. In 1882, Genik returned to his home village and established a school there. During the 1880s, Genik established a milling business as well as a producers' cooperative that he named the Carpathian Store. In 1890, he was elected to the town council in the town of his initial studies, Kolomyja.

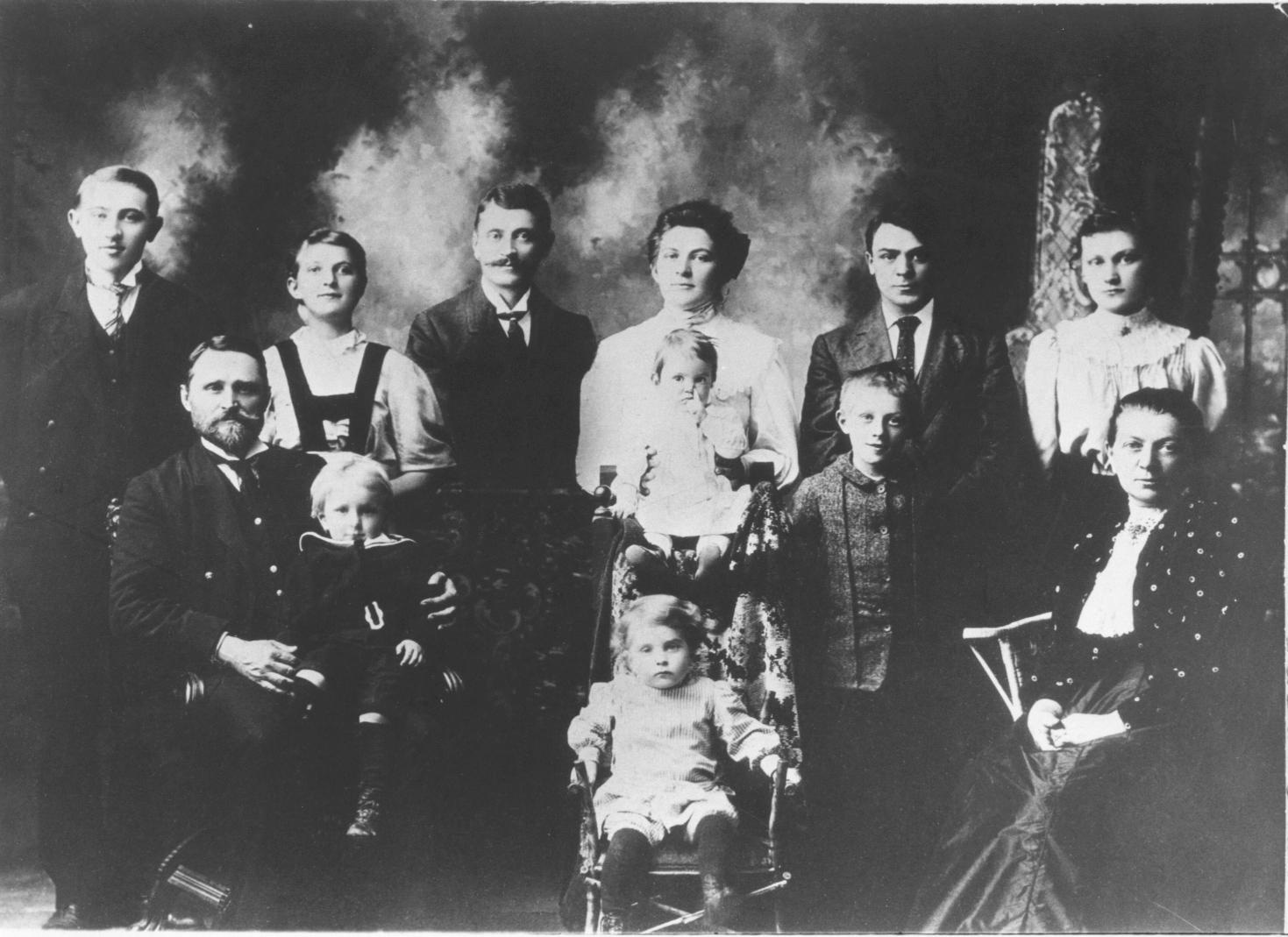
Cyril and Paulina (Tsurkowsky) Genik and children, and the Jones family, 1906

At some point, Genik met Joseph Oleskiw, a man who had been encouraging immigration by Ukrainians to Canada. Oleskiw asked Genik if he could accompany and lead his second contingent of Ukrainians on their voyage to Canada and help them get settled. Genik and his family of his wife and four children joined a group of 64 Ukrainians in landing at Montreal on July 22, 1896. Genik led his contingent firstly to Winnipeg and then to what was founded as Stuartburn, Manitoba, which is now considered to be the first Ukrainian Canadian community in Western Canada. In August, Genik applied for a homestead in Stuartburn, but quickly changed his mind and relocated to Winnipeg. That same month, Oleskiw recommended Genik to the Canadian Department of the Interior as an immigration agent. In September, Genik became an as-needed Department worker for the government's interpreting and translation needs. Father Nestor Dmytriw worked with him briefly in 1897–98 at the Immigration Hall in Winnipeg. In his job as an immigration agent, Genik met new Ukrainian Canadian immigrants at Quebec City, encouraged the use of English and the abandonment of traditional customs and served as a counsellor wherever necessary. His workload increased dramatically with the sharp rise in Ukrainian immigration to Canada – so much, in fact, that by 1898 Genik had become a full-time salaried employee of the Canadian government. In doing so, he had become the first Ukrainian full-time Canadian government public servant.

In 1899, Genik established the Taras Shevchenko Reading Hall in his house, and the first Ukrainian language newspaper in Canada, Kanadyiskyi farmer (Canadian farmer) in 1903. Despite not being religious himself, Genik believed that a Christian denomination should exist independent of Greek Orthodox and Russian Orthodox norms, and founded the 'Independent Greek Church' in cooperation with Winnipeg Presbyterian Church ministers in 1903–1904. In 1911, following the general election of that year in which Genik's favoured Liberal Party had lost office, Genik lost his job, and he finished his life in the public sphere. He lived for a while in the United States but returned to Winnipeg in his later life, where he died on February 12, 1925.

By the time of his death, Genik had become so well known in the Ukrainian Canadian community that he had come to be known as the "Czar of Canada".

== See also ==
- Tin Can Cathedral

== Bibliography ==
- Dictionary of Ukrainian Canadian biography, pioneer settlers of Manitoba, 1891–1900, V. J. Kaye, editor and compiler (Toronto, 1975).
- Oleksander Dombrovsky, Outline of the history of the Ukrainian Evangelical-Reformed movement (New York et Toronto, 1979) [text in Ukrainian].
- A heritage in transition : essays in the history of Ukrainians in Canada, M. R. Lupul, editor (Toronto, 1982).
- J.-P. Himka, Galician villagers and the Ukrainian national movement in the nineteenth century (New York, 1988).
- V. J. Kaye, Early Ukrainian settlements in Canada, 1895–1900 Dr. Josef Oleskow's role in the settlement of the Canadian northwest (Toronto, 1964).
- Orest T. Martynowych, The Seraphimite, Independent Greek, Presbyterian and United Churches
- Orest T. Martynowych, The Taras Shevchenko Reading Club/Educational Society
- Orest T. Martynowych, Ukrainians in Canada : the formative period, 1891–1924 (Edmonton, 1991).
- M. H. Marunchak, Studies in the history of Ukrainians in Canada (5 vol. published, Winnipeg, 1964– ) [text in Ukrainian].
- O. I. Sych, From the « new land » letters of Ukrainian emigrants from Canada (Edmonton, 1991) [text in Ukrainian].
