= Dobromirka =

Rural locality in Ternopil Oblast, Ukraine

- Village
- Location in Ukraine Dobromirka (Ternopil Oblast)
- Coordinates: 49°38′42″N 25°57′50″E
- Country: Ukraine
- Oblast: Ternopil
- Raion: Ternopil Raion
- Elevation: 351 m (1,151 ft)
- Time zone: UTC+2 (CET)
  - Summer (DST): UTC+3 (CEST)

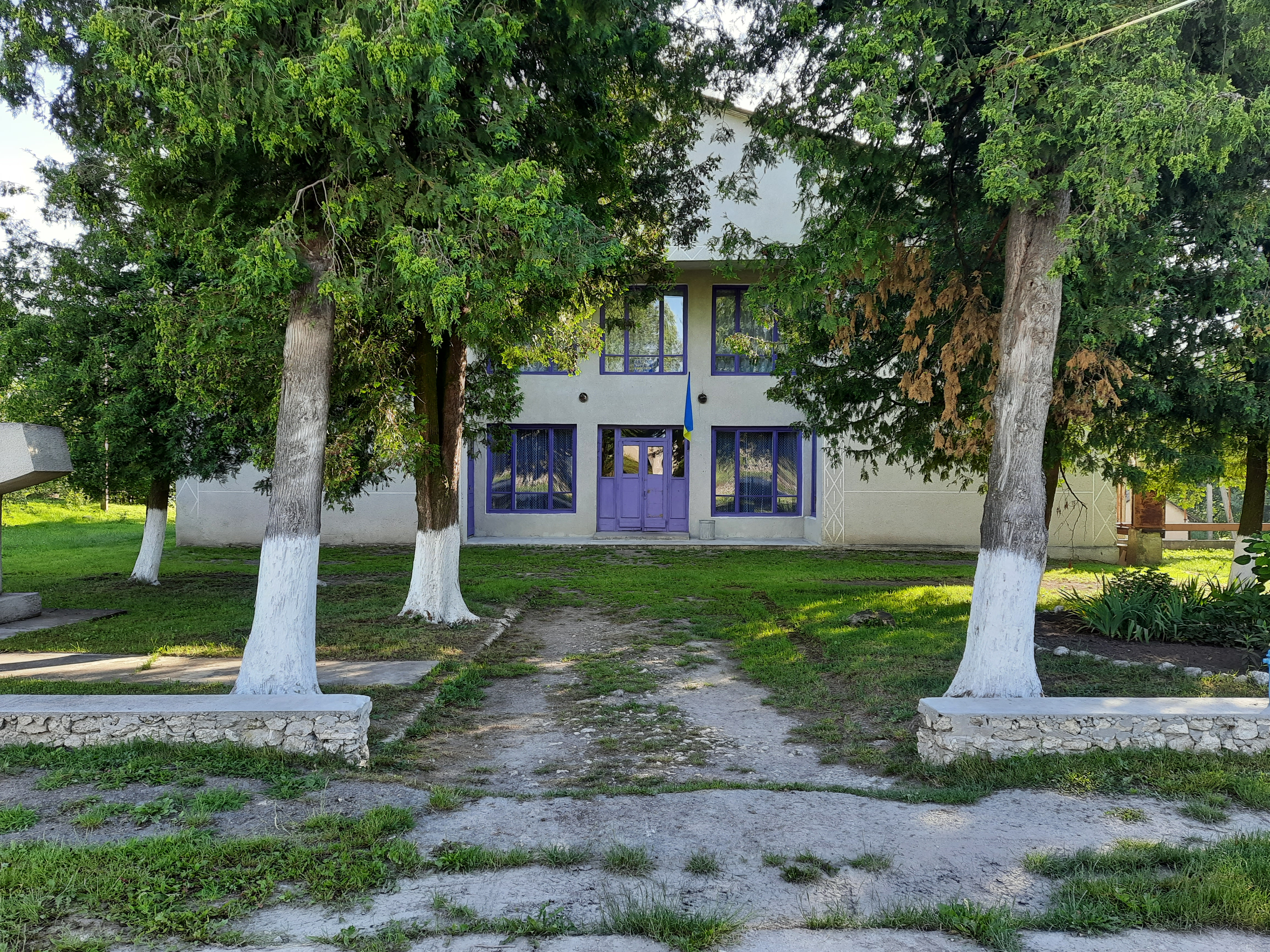
Dobromirka Village House of Culture

Dobromirka is a village in Ternopil Raion of Ternopil Oblast in Ukraine. It belongs to Zbarazh urban hromada, one of the hromadas of Ukraine.

Until 18 July 2020, Dobromirka belonged to Zbarazh Raion. The raion was abolished in July 2020 as part of the administrative reform of Ukraine, which reduced the number of raions of Ternopil Oblast to three. The area of Zbarazh Raion was split between Kremenets and Ternopil Raions, with Dobromirka being transferred to Ternopil Raion.
