= Nykyta Budka =

Ukrainian bishop (1877–1949)

Blessed Nykyta Budka
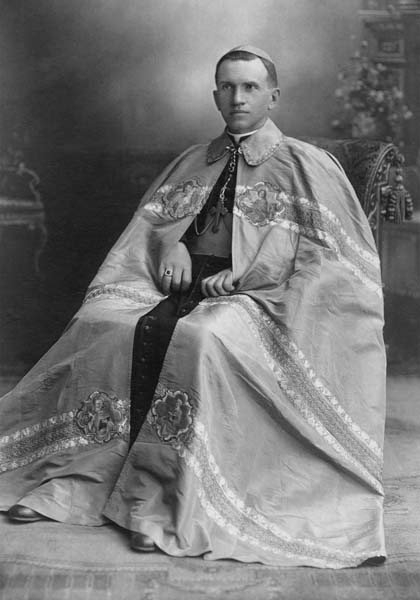
- Nykyta Budka

Bishop and Martyr
- Born: 7 June 1877; Dobromirka, Austria-Hungary
- Died: 28 September 1949 (aged 72); Karaganda, Soviet Union
- Venerated in: Catholic Church
- Beatified: 27 June 2001, Ukraine by Pope John Paul II
- Feast: 28 September

Nykyta Budka (Ukrainian: Никита Будка aka Nikita, Mykyta, or Nicetas Budka; June 7, 1877 in Dobromirka, Austria-Hungary – October 1, 1949 in Karaganda, USSR) was an Austro-Hungarian-born priest of the Ukrainian Greek Catholic Church who lived and worked in Austria-Hungary, Canada, Poland, and the Soviet Union. In Canada, he is noted as the first bishop of the Ukrainian Catholic Church in Canada, and was the first Eastern Catholic bishop with full jurisdiction ever appointed in the New World.

Budka returned to Europe in 1927 and eventually came under the authority of the Soviet Union. He resisted their encroachments against the Ukrainian Church, however, and was worked to death at a gulag in 1949. His cause for canonization was opened after his death and he was beatified as a martyr in 2001 by Pope John Paul II.

== Early life ==
He was born into a fairly well to-do and political active peasant family in the village of Dobromirka in Zbarazh powiat (county), then part of Galicia, in Austria-Hungary in 1877. He received his primary education in his native village and the county town, and later studied at the classical gymnasium in Ternopil, where he graduated in 1897 with honors. He then worked as a tutor for the children of Prince Leo Sapieha in Bilche Zolote, and then did a year of military service, taking officer's training in Vienna. He studied law at the University of Lviv and theology at Lviv Theological Seminary. In 1902 he entered the Collegium Canisianum in Innsbruck, Austria. Budka was ordained as a priest by Metropolitan Andriy (Sheptytsky) in L'viv, the capital of Austrian Galicia, on October 25, 1905 at the age of twenty-eight.

In 1907 Budka was named the prefect of the seminary in Lviv. In 1909 he wrote a doctoral dissertation on Byzantine religious history 1909 entitled Діссертация докторска: Дисциплїна Грецкої Церкви в сьвітлі полєміки за часів Фотия, but was not able to defend it due to ill health and later his departure for Canada. Besides his other duties he was later also made an adviser to the marriage tribunal and a consultant on emigration issues, which became his real avocation. During his studies, in 1907, he organized a Galician branch of the St. Raphael Society (an immigrants' aid charity) to protect Ukrainian emigrants from Galicia and Bukovina, and worked in the organization for five years, during which time he toured Ukrainian settlements in Prussia and Bosnia. He was also the founder and editor of the monthly publication Емігрант ("Emigrant") from 1910 - 1912. During this time he was charged with the care of Ukrainian immigrants in Austria, Germany, Brazil, Argentina, Canada and Bosnia by Metropolitan Andriy.

== Consecration as bishop ==
He was appointed bishop for Ukrainian Catholics in Canada and titular bishop of Patara on July 15, 1912 by Pope Pius XI, and was consecrated (ordained a bishop) on October 14 of that year. He arrived in Winnipeg in December of 1912 and immediately embarked on a tour of the Ukrainian block settlements of Western Canadian by train, horse, and foot in difficult winter conditions, returning in March 1913. His first organization tasks were to secure charters of incorporation under provincial laws for various parishes and one under federal law for the eparchy as a whole. The highly controversial issue of who should own church property in Canada: a local parish council, or the (Latin-controlled) hierarchy was thus somewhat diffused. He also took over the newspaper Canadian Ruthenian from the Latin bishops and published his pastoral letters in it.

In Canada he helped to establish residences for Ukrainian youth, organize parishes, build churches and schools, and found the seminaries named for Andriy Sheptytsky in Saint-Boniface, Manitoba and Taras Shevchenko in Edmonton, Alberta. In Canada, he became known as a strident defender of the autonomy of the Ukrainian church from the Latin hierarchy, and a fierce opponent of missionary activities amongst Ukrainian Canadians by Russian Orthodox and Protestant churches, and of secularism. He was broadly supportive of Ukrainian nationalism.

Before the Great War, his greatest struggle was against a group of young anti-clerical professionals, mostly teachers. They sought to establish or defend Ukrainian institutions in Canada with an overtly nationalist (and often secular) orientation. They saw Budka as insufficiently nationalist, bound to the Latin hierarchy, seeking to establish Catholic predominance over the Ukrainian community, and the hierarchy's control of the church (including the flash point issue of ownership of church buildings). This ultimately led to the creation of the Ukrainian Greek Orthodox Church of Canada by dissenting parishes in 1918 and a full schism between that group at the Catholic church. By the same token the socialist wing of the community started its own quasi-church institution, the Ukrainian Labour Temple Association, in 1918. While most Ukrainians in Canada were still Catholic, after 1918 the Catholic Church permanently lost its role as the predominant institution of Ukrainian life.

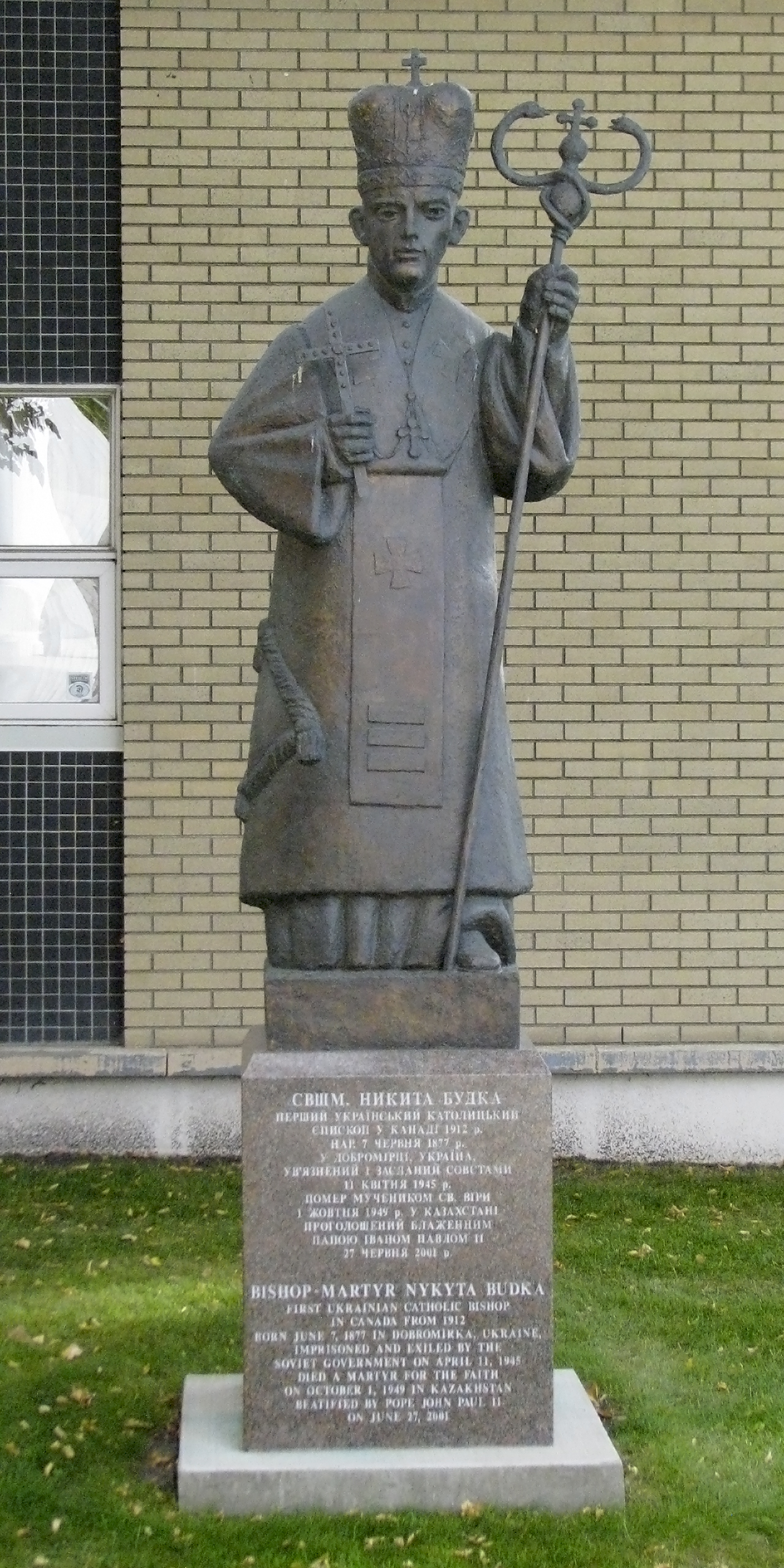
Statue of Nykyta Budka on the grounds of St. Josaphat Cathedral in Edmonton, Alberta

In Canada Budka is most famous for his pastoral letter just before the outbreak of World War I, in which he urged Ukrainians in Canada with reservist obligations to return to their homeland to enlist and fight. Their homeland was Austria, which soon was at war with Canada. Although he later retracted his letter, the damage was already done. This helped inflame an existing suspicion and scrutiny of the Ukrainian Canadian community by the wider public and the government that led to the internment of Ukrainians in Canada during the war. Budka, who was naturalized as British subject (i.e. Canadian citizen) in 1918 or 1920 was charged twice with crimes of disloyalty and cleared in both cases.

Following the war he continued his organizational work despite his eparchy's precarious finances: he help found the Ukrainian National Council in Winnipeg in 1919, hosted a sobor (synod) in Yorkton in 1924. He continued until 1927, when he left for a visit to Rome and while there asked to be transferred back to Galicia, exhausted from his fifteen years at the head of the Canadian church.

== Martyrdom ==
In 1928, he returned to now Polish-controlled Galicia and became vicar general of the Metropolitan Curia in L'viv and worked on the restoration of the Shrine of the Virgin in Zarvanytsia. At the end of World War II, Galicia was occupied by the Soviet Union, and Budka opposed the communist-mandated separation of the Ukrainian Catholic Church from Rome, and for this he was imprisoned on April 11, 1945, along with other bishops.

He was charged with teaching in an underground seminary, conducting a memorial service for the victims of the Soviet occupation of Galicia in 1939, and campaigning for the secession of Ukraine for the Soviet Union. Sentenced to 8 years imprisonment, he was sent to Kazakhstan to serve his sentence.

He died in the gulag on September 28, 1949 from what Soviet officials said was a heart attack. Budka was beatified as a martyr on June 27, 2001, in a Byzantine rite ceremony by Pope John Paul II in Lviv.

"The nurse in the camp gave the following account; 'When patients died, their hospital gowns were removed. They placed the bodies in plastic bags, numbered them and attached a card to the bag with personal data. Then they transported the bodies to the nearest forest where wild animals ate them.' According to the nurse's account the bishops foresaw his own death. 'by surprise tomorrow I will not be here anymore.' And that is what happened. To show his respect and acknowledge the bishop's dignity, the camp guard left the prison clothes on the body's corpse. His remains were taken and left in the forest, just as was done with the bodies of his predecessors. Thinking about the goodness of this man of God, who had served his brothers to the last, many of the convicts got together the next morning to have a last look at this man who was the body of angelic goodness for so many. But all they found was a piece of his shirt sleeve."
