= 2021 Alberta referendum =

Referendum in Canada

Equalization payments referendum
- October 18, 2021
- Should Section 36(2) of the Constitution Act, 1982 — Parliament and the Government of Canada’s commitment to the principle of making equalization payments — be removed from the Constitution?

Results
Choice	Votes	%
Yes	642,501	61.68%
No	399,169	38.32%
Valid votes	1,041,670	95.34%
Invalid or blank votes	50,969	4.66%
Total votes	1,092,639	100.00%
Registered voters/turnout	2,822,303	38.71%

Daylight saving time referendum
- October 18, 2021
- Do you want Alberta to adopt year-round Daylight Saving Time, which is summer hours, eliminating the need to change our clocks twice a year?

Results
Choice	Votes	%
Yes	531,782	49.76%
No	536,874	50.24%
Valid votes	1,068,656	97.78%
Invalid or blank votes	24,304	2.22%
Total votes	1,092,960	100.00%
Registered voters/turnout	2,822,303	38.73%

On October 18, 2021, a referendum was held in Alberta, Canada on two questions, whether equalization payments should be eliminated from the Constitution of Canada, and whether the province should observe daylight saving time year-round. The referendum was held as part of the 2021 Alberta municipal elections and the Senate nominee election.

A majority voted in favour of the federal government cancelling the equalization program and a majority voted to retain seasonal DLT. However the equalization program stayed in place, and Alberta adopted permanent DLT in 2026.

== History ==
The Alberta government had passed the Citizen Initiative Act in 2021 whereby so many names on a petition could force the government to hold a referendum on a policy question. But the referendums held in 2021 were questions voluntarily put forward by the government itself under the Referendum Act passed in 2000.

=== Equalization ===
Canada was created as a federal state with a financial relationship between the federal and provincial governments. Currently, there are three primary forms of transfers provided by the federal government to provinces. The Canada Health Transfer is a per-capita transfer payment program in support of the health systems of the provinces and territories of Canada, and represents approximately 47 per cent of major federal transfers. Funds provided through the Canadian Health Transfer must be used by provinces and territories for the purposes of "maintaining the national criteria" for publicly provided health care in Canada (as set out in the Canada Health Act). The second form of transfer is the Canada Social Transfer, a per-capita transfer in support of post-secondary education, social assistance, and social services, including early childhood development and early learning and childcare, which represents 20 per cent of major federal transfers. The third major program is equalization, which represents approximately 25 per cent of major federal transfers. Equalization is intended to address fiscal disparities among Canadian provinces based on estimates of provinces' fiscal capacity—their ability to generate tax revenues. These programs are paid for by taxes (income and corporate) and other revenue sources generated across the country.

The equalization program began in 1957 under Progressive Conservative Prime Minister John Diefenbaker to mitigate horizontal fiscal imbalance between provinces. Successive Alberta governments and popular opinion in the province have decried the equalization formula, noting that Alberta has not received funding under the equalization program since 1965. The current equalization formula was implemented shortly after Stephen Harper's Conservative Party of Canada formed a minority government after the 2006 Canadian federal election. Shortly before the election, Liberal Finance Minister Ralph Goodale formed the "Expert Panel on Equalization and Territorial Formula Financing" chaired by Al O'Brien—a former Government of Alberta deputy minister—to produce a report on the future of equalization. The report titled "Achieving a National Purpose: Putting Equalization Back on Track" was tabled in parliament in May 2006. The Harper government used the report as a basis for reforms to the equalization program.

The equalization referendum question asks whether Section 36(2), which expounds the principle of the federal government making equalization payments, be removed from the Constitution Act, 1982. The amending formula for the Canadian Constitution requires agreement from seven provinces representing 50 per cent of the population of Canada (7+50 formula) and a "yes" vote by a single province in a referendum does not have legal consequence, as a provincial government cannot unilaterally modify equalization. Unlike the Daylight savings question, the question on equalization, even if passed, as it did, was to have no immediate effect as the Alberta government did not have the right to amend the Canadian Constitution on its own.

=== Daylight saving time ===
In 1948, the Government of Alberta formally set the province's time zone with the passage of The Daylight Saving Time Act, which mandated the entire province observe Mountain Standard Time, and prevented any municipality from observing daylight saving time or any other time zone. The bill came after Calgary (1946 and 1947), and Edmonton (1946) held municipal plebiscites which approved the move to daylight saving time, and after Edmonton had brought it in inside city boundaries on a voluntary basis in 1947, against the government's wishes.

Alberta's urban municipalities were largely in favour of daylight saving time and pressured the provincial government to hold a provincial plebiscite or permit municipalities to observe daylight saving time. The effort in the Legislature was spearheaded by Liberal MLA and Calgary Alderman Bill Dickie who in March 1964 brought forward a motion to permit municipalities to hold plebiscites on the issue; the motion was defeated by the Social Credit government. At the time Social Credit MLA William Patterson described daylight saving time as "that fandangled thing", and Minister Allen Russell Patrick stated that municipal daylight saving time would be difficult for tourists to understand.

The Social Credit government finally gave in to the request for a provincial plebiscite on daylight saving time, approving a motion by Bill Dickie put forward in February 1966. On March 29, 1966, Minister Alfred Hooke introduced An Act to amend The Daylight Saving Time Act (Bill 75) amending the Daylight Saving Time Act to permit the government to hold a plebiscite on the issue. Alberta voters were asked the question "Do you favour Province-wide Daylight Saving Time?" during the 1967 Alberta general election. A narrow majority of 51.25 per cent of voters rejected daylight saving time. Support for daylight savings time was seen in the southern and eastern parts of the province including Lloydminister, Cold Lake, and Medicine Hat.

Across Canada, by 1967, each province besides Alberta and Saskatchewan had adopted daylight saving time. Many Alberta businesses provided for modified summer hours, including the Alberta Stock Exchange which started at 7 a.m. to align with exchanges in Toronto and Montreal. Air Canada released a statement expressing the difficulty of distributing flight schedules with flights to or from Alberta.

After 25 years as Premier, Social Credit leader Ernest Manning stepped down officially on December 12, 1968, and his successor Harry Strom was sworn in as Premier. Only a few months later in April 1969, Strom announced Albertans would once again be asked to vote on daylight saving time in conjunction with the next scheduled provincial general election. During the announcement, Strom stated he was neutral on the topic and did not have a preference one way or another. The 1971 plebiscite on daylight saving time resulted in an overwhelming majority of the Alberta population approving the transition with 61.47 per cent in favour. A statement from Unifarm, a farmer representative organization which opposed daylight saving time, admitted that the organization anticipated the proposal would pass, but also downplayed the consequences for farmers. The new Progressive Conservative government highlighted the change to observe daylight saving in the Speech from the Throne in early March 1972, and Attorney-General Merv Leitch announced on March 14, 1972 that Alberta would officially observe daylight saving time, with the first season's start date set for April 30, 1972, lasting until October 29, 1972.

== Prelude ==
United Conservative Party of Alberta leader Jason Kenney first promised in November 2017 to hold a provincial referendum on equalization, shortly after being named party leader in the 2017 United Conservative Party leadership election. The commitment to an equalization referendum was reiterated when the United Conservative Party platform document listed the referendum as the number three commitment in the leadup to the 2019 Alberta general election, behind the party's job creation plan, and the promise to repeal the carbon tax. The plan for a referendum came as a protest in the perceived lack of progress on new pipelines such as the Trans Mountain pipeline expansion. The United Conservative Party was subsequently elected to form a majority government in 2019, and on April 30 Kenney was sworn in as the premier.

=== Fair Deal Panel ===
On November 9, 2019 at the Manning Centre "What’s Next?" Conference, Kenney announced the formation of the "Fair Deal Panel" to consult with Albertans on how best to secure a "fair deal" for Alberta in Confederation. The panel was provided a list of specific measures to consider, and given a mandate to hold town halls across Alberta to hear the concerns of Albertans. Amongst the measures put forward for the Panel to review, included an Alberta Pension Plan, and establishment of an Alberta Provincial Police. Along with the Fair Deal Panel, Kenney sought to demand reform to the equalization formula to exclude non-renewable resource revenue from the calculation and impose a hard cap on equalization transfers, and hold a referendum on removing equalization provisions from the Constitution Act if substantial progress is not made on a coastal pipeline and Bill C-69 is not repealed.

On March 31, 2020 the Fair Deal Panel Report to Government was released outlining 25 recommendations to the government. The second recommendation of the Panel was to proceed with the proposed referendum on the question of removing equalization from the constitution. Premier Kenney responded by promising to hold the referendum on equalization, and continue to study the recommendation of creating an Alberta Provincial Police and pull out of the Canada Pension Plan.

Alberta’s election laws were modified to allow members of the cabinet to publicly comment on the referendum, which had previously been prohibited.

=== Reaction ===
Commentators such as Trevor Tombe have argued the referendum on equalization is not held to facilitate constitutional change, but instead a way to elevate Alberta's position in Confederation and get the attention of the federal government.

=== Legal basis ===
The legal argument for Alberta's constitutional referendum on equalization is based on the Supreme Court of Canada decision Reference re Secession of Quebec. In Reference re Secession of Quebec, the Court ruled that a province could not unilaterally separate from Canada following a provincial referendum, and the Court offered guidance on the response by the federal and provincial government on referendums on constitutional matters. In particular, the Court stated that "the clear repudiation of the existing constitutional order and the clear expression of the desire to pursue secession ... would give rise to a reciprocal obligation on all parties to Confederation to negotiate constitutional changes to respond to that desire." As well as the statement following "[t]he corollary of a legitimate attempt by one participant in Confederation to seek an amendment to the Constitution is an obligation on all parties to come to the negotiating table."

There is disagreement as to whether the Reference re Secession of Quebec decision is applicable to the equalization referendum. University of Calgary political science professor Rainer Knopff believes the "binding obligation" described is applicable. Others, including University of Waterloo political science professor Emmett Macfarlane and University of Alberta law professor Eric Adams, argue that the "binding obligation" is entirely for provincial succession, and the Supreme Court opinion noted that provinces have a mechanism to initiate constitutional change through the amending formula.

The Government of Alberta position provided by Premier Kenney is that if Albertans approve a clear question it would result in a binding obligation on the Government of Canada "to negotiate that amendment with the province in good faith". The next step for the Alberta government would be to pass an amendment to the Constitution in the Legislative Assembly of Alberta, triggering the legal obligation for the federal government to commence formal negotiations to remove the section.

== Questions ==
On June 7, 2021 the Government of Alberta announced the referendum questions to be put before Albertans during the 2021 municipal elections. On August 9, 2021, two Order in Councils were issued under the Referendum Act finalizing the questions and election procedure.

The equalization question is: "Should Section 36(2) of the Constitution Act, 1982 — Parliament and the Government of Canada’s commitment to the principle of making equalization payments — be removed from the Constitution?"

The question for daylight saving time is: "Do you want Alberta to adopt year-round Daylight Saving Time, which is summer hours, eliminating the need to change our clocks twice a year?"

== Opinion polling ==
=== Equalization ===
- Should Section 36(2) of the Constitution Act, 1982 — Parliament and the Government of Canada’s commitment to the principle of making equalization payments — be removed from the Constitution?

==== Province-wide ====
Date(s) conducted	Yes	No	Undecided	Lead	Sample	Conducted by	Polling type	Notes
12—13 October	55%	29%	16%	26%	935	Mainstreet Research / Western Standard	IVR	
21 September—6 October	43%	26%	28%	17%	1,204	Leger / Common Ground	Online	

==== Regional ====
- Calgary

Date(s) conducted	Yes	No	Undecided	Lead	Sample	Conducted by	Polling type	Notes
8—11 October	50%	34%	16%	16%	502	Leger / Calgary Herald	Online	

- Edmonton

Date(s) conducted	Yes	No	Undecided	Lead	Sample	Conducted by	Polling type	Notes
8—11 October	33%	41%	16%	8%	503	Leger / Edmonton Journal	Online	

=== Daylight saving time ===
- Do you want Alberta to adopt year-round Daylight Saving Time, which is summer hours, eliminating the need to change our clocks twice a year?

==== Regional ====
- Calgary

Date(s) conducted	Yes	No	Undecided	Lead	Sample	Conducted by	Polling type	Notes
8—11 October	48%	44%	8%	4%	502	Leger / Calgary Herald	Online	

- Edmonton

Date(s) conducted	Yes	No	Undecided	Lead	Sample	Conducted by	Polling type	Notes
8—11 October	47%	42%	11%	5%	503	Leger / Edmonton Journal	Online	

== Results ==
=== Equalization ===
End of equalization
Choice	Votes	%
For	642,501	61.68
Against	399,169	38.32
Total	1,041,670	100.00
Registered voters/turnout	2,822,303	38.71

Results of the 2021 Referendum on Equalization by Municipality
County/Municipality	Number of Electors	Yes	%	No	%	Rejected Ballots	Blank Ballots	Yes/no
Acme	137	106	78.52%	29	21.48%	2	2	Yes
Airdrie	12,029	8,161	70.36%	3,438	29.64%	430	420	Yes
Alberta Beach	255	192	76.19%	60	23.81%	3	2	Yes
Alix	215	160	78.43%	44	21.57%	11	11	Yes
Alliance	78	62	82.67%	13	17.33%	3	3	Yes
Amisk	60	55	93.22%	4	6.78%	1	0	Yes
Andrew	150	97	74.62%	33	25.38%	20	18	Yes
Arrowwood	71	45	70.31%	19	29.69%	7	7	Yes
Athabasca	730	425	63.62%	243	36.38%	62	50	Yes
Athabasca County	2,221	1,696	78.92%	453	21.08%	72	66	Yes
Banff	2,093	738	41.53%	1,039	58.47%	316	311	No
Barnwell	213	167	83.92%	32	16.08%	14	14	Yes
Barons	107	81	80.20%	20	19.80%	6	6	Yes
Barrhead	1,366	904	71.41%	362	28.59%	100	94	Yes
Bashaw	318	227	74.18%	79	25.82%	12	11	Yes
Bassano	427	320	78.05%	90	21.95%	17	17	Yes
Bawlf	84	57	69.51%	25	30.49%	2	2	Yes
Beaumont	4,578	2,762	65.10%	1,481	34.90%	335	335	Yes
Beaver County	1,462	1,148	80.50%	278	19.50%	36	31	Yes
Beaverlodge	486	362	77.85%	103	22.15%	21	18	Yes
Beiseker	243	171	72.46%	65	27.54%	7	6	Yes
Bentley	309	229	77.89%	65	22.11%	15	14	Yes
Berwyn	67	49	74.24%	17	25.76%	1	1	Yes
Big Lakes County	1,353	1,065	81.42%	243	18.58%	45	37	Yes
Big Valley	145	103	72.03%	40	27.97%	2	2	Yes
Birch Hills County	365	290	85.29%	50	14.71%	25	24	Yes
Bittern Lake	80	66	86.84%	10	13.16%	4	4	Yes
Black Diamond	859	610	73.14%	224	26.86%	25	24	Yes
Blackfalds	1,394	1,130	81.06%	264	18.94%	0	0	Yes
Bon Accord	361	246	69.69%	107	30.31%	8	5	Yes
Bonnyville	1,290	946	78.18%	264	21.82%	80	77	Yes
Bow Island	304	203	70.49%	85	29.51%	16	15	Yes
Bowden	367	277	77.16%	82	22.84%	8	8	Yes
Boyle	253	179	74.90%	60	25.10%	14	12	Yes
Brazeau County	2,670	2,273	87.19%	334	12.81%	63	59	Yes
Breton	166	127	79.87%	32	20.13%	7	4	Yes
Brooks	2,550	1,811	75.52%	587	24.48%	152	141	Yes
Bruderheim	203	158	78.61%	43	21.39%	2	1	Yes
Buffalo Lake Métis Settlement	44	33	75.00%	11	25.00%	0	0	Yes
Calgary	392,780	218,856	58.19%	157,244	41.81%	16,680	16,463	Yes
Calmar	552	422	78.88%	113	21.12%	17	16	Yes
Camrose	5,288	3,398	69.33%	1,503	30.67%	387	384	Yes
Camrose County	2,293	1,792	79.57%	460	20.43%	41	34	Yes
Canmore	4,838	1,565	35.87%	2,798	64.13%	475	474	No
Carbon	235	184	82.14%	40	17.86%	11	11	Yes
Cardston	1,306	1,008	82.42%	215	17.58%	83	80	Yes
Cardston County	1,338	1,108	86.49%	173	13.51%	57	56	Yes
Carmangay	119	77	68.14%	36	31.86%	6	4	Yes
Caroline	96	70	76.92%	21	23.08%	5	5	Yes
Carstairs	1,214	939	79.98%	235	20.02%	40	40	Yes
Castor	309	231	79.66%	59	20.34%	19	16	Yes
Champion	125	102	83.61%	20	16.39%	3	1	Yes
Chauvin	142	118	84.29%	22	15.71%	2	2	Yes
Chestermere	4,731	3,330	74.51%	1,139	25.49%	262	259	Yes
Chipman	108	79	73.83%	28	26.17%	1	1	Yes
Claresholm	1,469	991	71.71%	391	28.29%	87	83	Yes
Clear Hills County	602	495	84.47%	91	15.53%	16	15	Yes
Clearwater County	3,676	2,992	83.74%	581	16.26%	103	87	Yes
Clive	186	165	89.19%	20	10.81%	1	1	Yes
Clyde	63	34	57.63%	25	42.37%	4	4	Yes
Coaldale	2,862	1,916	75.82%	611	24.18%	335	335	Yes
Coalhurst	632	428	70.51%	179	29.49%	25	16	Yes
Cochrane	6,844	4,395	66.58%	2,206	33.42%	243	240	Yes
Cold Lake	2,737	1,909	72.81%	713	27.19%	115	112	Yes
Consort	216	172	83.50%	34	16.50%	10	7	Yes
Coronation	293	231	82.50%	49	17.50%	13	12	Yes
County of Barrhead No. 11	1,678	1,304	80.64%	313	19.36%	61	55	Yes
County of Forty Mile No. 8	399	350	89.29%	42	10.71%	7	7	Yes
County of Grande Prairie No. 1	4,933	3,934	81.64%	885	18.36%	114	98	Yes
County of Minburn No. 27	719	476	69.19%	212	30.81%	31	29	Yes
County of Newell	1,528	1,290	86.46%	202	13.54%	36	36	Yes
County of Northern Lights	713	557	79.57%	143	20.43%	13	10	Yes
County of Paintearth No. 18	446	376	85.65%	63	14.35%	7	6	Yes
County of St. Paul No. 19	2,495	1,890	78.98%	503	21.02%	102	102	Yes
County of Stettler No. 6	1,877	1,587	86.20%	254	13.80%	36	33	Yes
County of Two Hills No. 21	910	722	79.78%	183	20.22%	5	5	Yes
County of Vermilion River	2,326	1,937	85.97%	316	14.03%	73	60	Yes
County of Warner No. 5	428	350	85.37%	60	14.63%	18	17	Yes
County of Wetaskiwin No. 10	2,710	2,183	81.70%	489	18.30%	38	38	Yes
Coutts	74	61	84.72%	11	15.28%	2	2	Yes
Cowley	48	39	81.25%	9	18.75%	0	0	Yes
Cremona	144	91	68.42%	42	31.58%	11	8	Yes
Crossfield	550	444	81.02%	104	18.98%	2	2	Yes
Crowsnest Pass	1,749	1,215	71.94%	474	28.06%	60	52	Yes
Cypress County	1,809	1,494	84.60%	272	15.40%	43	41	Yes
Czar	79	70	89.74%	8	10.26%	1	1	Yes
Daysland	317	228	76.51%	70	23.49%	19	18	Yes
Delburne	170	133	78.24%	37	21.76%	0	0	Yes
Delia	53	43	81.13%	10	18.87%	0	0	Yes
Devon	2,083	1,395	68.05%	655	31.95%	33	32	Yes
Didsbury	1,669	1,120	73.49%	404	26.51%	145	143	Yes
Donalda	95	74	86.05%	12	13.95%	9	8	Yes
Donnelly	50	32	64.00%	18	36.00%	0	0	Yes
Drayton Valley	1,849	1,478	81.88%	327	18.12%	44	39	Yes
Drumheller	2,653	1,803	71.63%	714	28.37%	136	50	Yes
Duchess	176	152	86.86%	23	13.14%	1	1	Yes
East Prairie Métis Settlement	17	8	50.00%	8	50.00%	1	1	N/A
Eckville	271	215	80.52%	52	19.48%	4	4	Yes
Edberg	54	42	79.25%	11	20.75%	1	0	Yes
Edgerton	147	113	80.14%	28	19.86%	6	1	Yes
Edmonton	235,852	108,059	48.09%	116,632	51.91%	11,161	10,997	No
Edson	1,775	1,278	76.21%	399	23.79%	98	91	Yes
Elizabeth Métis Settlement	20	14	70.00%	6	30.00%	0	0	Yes
Elk Point	475	310	71.10%	126	28.90%	39	38	Yes
Elnora	91	70	76.92%	21	23.08%	0	0	Yes
Empress	104	69	70.41%	29	29.59%	6	6	Yes
Fairview	428	332	78.67%	90	21.33%	6	6	Yes
Falher	201	155	79.08%	41	20.92%	5	4	Yes
Fishing Lake Métis Settlement	32	19	63.33%	11	36.67%	2	1	Yes
Flagstaff County	793	680	87.07%	101	12.93%	12	12	Yes
Foothills County	4,199	3,370	80.64%	809	19.36%	20	19	Yes
Foremost	204	148	77.49%	43	22.51%	13	13	Yes
Forestburg	184	140	77.78%	40	22.22%	4	4	Yes
Fort Macleod	726	481	70.63%	200	29.37%	45	44	Yes
Fort Saskatchewan	6,269	3,983	66.99%	1,963	33.01%	323	322	Yes
Fox Creek	443	332	77.93%	94	22.07%	17	17	Yes
Gibbons	782	539	71.11%	219	28.89%	24	23	Yes
Girouxville	58	47	82.46%	10	17.54%	1	1	Yes
Glendon	158	121	79.61%	31	20.39%	6	5	Yes
Glenwood	124	89	74.17%	31	25.83%	4	4	Yes
Grande Prairie	9,801	6,382	69.48%	2,804	30.52%	615	434	Yes
Grimshaw	386	279	72.47%	106	27.53%	1	1	Yes
Halkirk	39	34	87.18%	5	12.82%	0	0	Yes
Hanna	801	618	81.42%	141	18.58%	42	42	Yes
Hardisty	228	186	83.41%	37	16.59%	5	5	Yes
Hay Lakes	122	97	81.51%	22	18.49%	3	1	Yes
Heisler	29	24	82.76%	5	17.24%	0	0	Yes
High Level	439	289	68.65%	132	31.35%	18	16	Yes
High Prairie	693	424	66.35%	215	33.65%	54	53	Yes
High River	4,241	2,909	73.15%	1,068	26.85%	264	261	Yes
Hill Spring	76	57	77.03%	17	22.97%	2	2	Yes
Hines Creek	110	86	81.13%	20	18.87%	4	4	Yes
Hinton	2,763	1,792	69.38%	791	30.62%	180	164	Yes
Holden	109	78	74.29%	27	25.71%	4	4	Yes
Hughenden	93	64	71.91%	25	28.09%	4	4	Yes
Hussar	68	60	88.24%	8	11.76%	0	0	Yes
Improvement District No. 4 (Waterton)	21	9	42.86%	12	57.14%	0	0	No
Innisfail	2,679	1,364	59.10%	944	40.90%	371	371	Yes
Innisfree	52	30	63.83%	17	36.17%	5	5	Yes
Irma	168	145	87.88%	20	12.12%	3	3	Yes
Irricana	370	281	76.78%	85	23.22%	4	4	Yes
Jasper	1,363	488	38.30%	786	61.70%	89	86	No
Killam	213	164	77.73%	47	22.27%	2	2	Yes
Kitscoty	230	183	80.62%	44	19.38%	3	3	Yes
Kneehill County	1,275	1,047	83.89%	201	16.11%	27	22	Yes
Lac La Biche County	3,219	2,283	76.20%	713	23.80%	223	213	Yes
Lac Ste. Anne County	3,017	2,350	80.73%	561	19.27%	106	104	Yes
Lacombe	2,464	1,659	70.78%	685	29.22%	120	119	Yes
Lacombe County	2,490	2,021	82.42%	431	17.58%	38	32	Yes
Lamont	439	317	76.02%	100	23.98%	22	22	Yes
Lamont County	1,144	601	56.12%	470	43.88%	73	68	Yes
Leduc	7,007	4,746	71.44%	1,897	28.56%	364	357	Yes
Leduc County	3,705	2,864	79.25%	750	20.75%	91	65	Yes
Legal	379	262	71.98%	102	28.02%	15	12	Yes
Lethbridge	28,293	15,608	59.19%	10,761	40.81%	1,924	1,892	Yes
Lethbridge County	1,209	986	83.99%	188	16.01%	35	35	Yes
Linden	212	158	79.40%	41	20.60%	13	13	Yes
Lloydminster	2,123	1,813	85.40%	310	14.60%	0	0	Yes
Longview	150	108	72.00%	42	28.00%	0	0	Yes
Lougheed	67	46	71.88%	18	28.13%	3	3	Yes
Mackenzie County	1,293	1,081	87.67%	152	12.33%	60	50	Yes
Magrath	841	618	77.54%	179	22.46%	44	42	Yes
Manning	265	189	73.83%	67	26.17%	9	9	Yes
Mannville	225	159	73.27%	58	26.73%	8	8	Yes
Marwayne	174	130	76.47%	40	23.53%	4	4	Yes
Mayerthorpe	191	141	75.81%	45	24.19%	5	4	Yes
McLennan	220	134	65.05%	72	34.95%	14	14	Yes
Medicine Hat	19,998	12,846	69.39%	5,667	30.61%	1,485	1,478	Yes
Milk River	435	309	75.37%	101	24.63%	25	24	Yes
Millet	505	359	72.09%	139	27.91%	7	7	Yes
Milo	65	49	77.78%	14	22.22%	2	2	Yes
Morinville	2,640	1,702	68.24%	792	31.76%	146	141	Yes
Morrin	77	55	76.39%	17	23.61%	5	3	Yes
Mountain View County	3,850	3,076	82.20%	666	17.80%	108	104	Yes
Mundare	352	241	73.25%	88	26.75%	23	23	Yes
Municipal Affairs (Note: conducted the referendum and reported on behalf of Allison Bay Indian Reserve #219, Athabasca Chipewyan First Nation, Chipewyan Prairie First Nation, Cold Lake First Nations, Cold Lake Indian Reserve #149, Cold Lake Indian Reserve #149A, Cold Lake Indian Reserve #149B, Cold Lake Indian Reserve #149C, Dog Head Indian Reserve #218, Eden Valley Indian Reserve #216, Fort McKay First Nation, Fort McKay Indian Reserve #174, Fort McMurray #468 First Nation, Frog Lake First Nation, Gregoire Lake Indian Reserve #176, Gregoire Lake Indian Reserve #176A, Improvement District No. 24 (Wood Buffalo), Janvier Indian Reserve #194, Kananaskis Improvement District, Kehewin Cree Nation, Kehewin Indian Reserve #123, Loon Lake Indian Reserve #235, Loon River Cree, Lubicon Lake Band, Mikisew Cree First Nation, Peigan Indian Reserve #147, Piikani Nation, Puskiakiwenin Indian Reserve #122, Special Areas Board, Stoney (Bearspaw) First Nation, Stoney (Chiniki) First Nation, Stoney (Wesley) First Nation, Stoney Indian Reserve No. 142, 143 & 144 (Morley), Stoney Nakoda Nation, Sturgeon Lake Cree Nation, Sturgeon Lake Indian Reserve #154, Sturgeon Lake Indian Reserve #154A, Summer Village of Birch Cove, Summer Village of Ghost Lake, Thabacha Nare #196, Thebathi #196, Unipouheos Indian Reserve #121, Utikoomak Lake Indian Reserve #155, Utikoomak Lake Indian Reserve #155A, Whitefish (Goodfish) Lake First Nation, Whitefish Lake First Nation, Woodland Cree First Nation, Woodland Cree Indian Reserve #226, Woodland Cree Indian Reserve #228)	314	184	88.89%	23	11.11%	107	5	Yes
Municipal District of Acadia No. 34	160	137	87.82%	19	12.18%	4	4	Yes
Municipal District of Bighorn No. 8	449	232	53.46%	202	46.54%	15	12	Yes
Municipal District of Bonnyville No. 87	4,272	3,427	84.97%	606	15.03%	239	239	Yes
Municipal District of Fairview No. 136	440	341	80.24%	84	19.76%	15	13	Yes
Municipal District of Greenview No. 16	2,225	1,746	81.25%	403	18.75%	76	70	Yes
Municipal District of Lesser Slave River No. 124	1,009	773	79.20%	203	20.80%	33	31	Yes
Municipal District of Opportunity No. 17	966	520	59.98%	347	40.02%	99	99	Yes
Municipal District of Peace No. 135	222	164	75.93%	52	24.07%	6	6	Yes
Municipal District of Pincher Creek No. 9	958	657	69.82%	284	30.18%	17	17	Yes
Municipal District of Provost No. 52	698	621	90.52%	65	9.48%	12	10	Yes
Municipal District of Ranchland No. 66	26	21	84.00%	4	16.00%	1	1	Yes
Municipal District of Smoky River No. 130	812	613	78.79%	165	21.21%	34	31	Yes
Municipal District of Spirit River No. 133	177	149	86.63%	23	13.37%	5	5	Yes
Municipal District of Taber	972	812	87.12%	120	12.88%	40	26	Yes
Municipal District of Wainwright No. 61	1,380	1,144	84.55%	209	15.45%	27	27	Yes
Municipal District of Willow Creek No. 26	1,342	1,083	83.95%	207	16.05%	52	51	Yes
Munson	94	80	88.89%	10	11.11%	4	4	Yes
Myrnam	61	50	81.97%	11	18.03%	0	0	Yes
Nampa	86	69	82.14%	15	17.86%	2	2	Yes
Nanton	774	548	72.68%	206	27.32%	20	20	Yes
Nobleford	256	209	81.64%	47	18.36%	0	0	Yes
Northern Sunrise County	494	354	73.60%	127	26.40%	13	13	Yes
Okotoks	7,523	5,170	72.05%	2,006	27.95%	347	346	Yes
Olds	2,361	1,580	72.95%	586	27.05%	195	194	Yes
Onoway	476	347	74.78%	117	25.22%	12	12	Yes
Oyen	201	170	85.86%	28	14.14%	3	3	Yes
Paddle Prairie Métis Settlement	8	7	100.00%	0	0.00%	1	1	Yes
Paradise Valley	39	31	79.49%	8	20.51%	0	0	Yes
Parkland County	7,836	5,615	74.43%	1,929	25.57%	292	288	Yes
Peace River	1,886	1,144	64.56%	628	35.44%	114	105	Yes
Peavine Métis Settlement	45	21	50.00%	21	50.00%	3	3	N/A
Penhold	834	419	54.56%	349	45.44%	66	66	Yes
Picture Butte	225	176	80.37%	43	19.63%	6	3	Yes
Pincher Creek	1,214	788	68.58%	361	31.42%	65	63	Yes
Ponoka	1,606	1,112	74.23%	386	25.77%	108	108	Yes
Ponoka County	2,320	1,902	84.42%	351	15.58%	67	66	Yes
Provost	621	523	86.16%	84	13.84%	14	14	Yes
Rainbow Lake	59	50	84.75%	9	15.25%	0	0	Yes
Raymond	1,477	1,116	78.98%	297	21.02%	64	59	Yes
Red Deer	21,750	13,980	68.62%	6,393	31.38%	1,377	1,370	Yes
Red Deer County	6,020	4,759	80.85%	1,127	19.15%	134	111	Yes
Redcliff	1,377	984	75.00%	328	25.00%	65	64	Yes
Redwater	636	491	77.20%	145	22.80%	0	0	Yes
Regional Municipality of Wood Buffalo	12,616	8,776	74.28%	3,039	25.72%	801	779	Yes
Rimbey	697	293	65.26%	156	34.74%	248	220	Yes
Rocky Mountain House	1,707	1,245	76.01%	393	23.99%	69	57	Yes
Rocky View County	11,520	8,425	74.94%	2,818	25.06%	277	247	Yes
Rockyford	115	83	75.45%	27	24.55%	5	5	Yes
Rosalind	67	47	70.15%	20	29.85%	0	0	Yes
Rosemary	112	90	82.57%	19	17.43%	3	3	Yes
Rycroft	159	120	76.43%	37	23.57%	2	2	Yes
Ryley	178	122	71.76%	48	28.24%	8	6	Yes
Saddle Hills County	727	573	82.21%	124	17.79%	30	25	Yes
Sedgewick	323	253	81.61%	57	18.39%	13	12	Yes
Sexsmith	467	357	81.14%	83	18.86%	27	23	Yes
Slave Lake	1,440	1,054	74.23%	366	25.77%	20	17	Yes
Smoky Lake	487	271	64.99%	146	35.01%	70	70	Yes
Smoky Lake County	1,034	763	81.34%	175	18.66%	96	95	Yes
Spirit River	250	188	78.99%	50	21.01%	12	10	Yes
Spring Lake	176	102	58.96%	71	41.04%	3	3	Yes
Spruce Grove	7,960	4,939	65.00%	2,659	35.00%	362	359	Yes
St. Albert	17,780	8,945	53.06%	7,913	46.94%	922	919	Yes
St. Paul	1,367	892	72.29%	342	27.71%	133	69	Yes
Standard	123	94	78.33%	26	21.67%	3	3	Yes
Starland County	543	442	84.84%	79	15.16%	22	10	Yes
Stavely	194	151	80.32%	37	19.68%	6	6	Yes
Stettler	1,362	1,005	77.37%	294	22.63%	63	33	Yes
Stirling	208	175	84.95%	31	15.05%	2	1	Yes
Stony Plain	4,327	2,877	71.00%	1,175	29.00%	275	232	Yes
Strathcona County	30,501	18,302	62.63%	10,919	37.37%	1,280	1,264	Yes
Strathmore	3,631	2,522	74.24%	875	25.76%	234	234	Yes
Sturgeon County	4,554	3,267	74.05%	1,145	25.95%	142	142	Yes
Summer Village of Burnstick Lake	7	3	50.00%	3	50.00%	1	1	N/A
Summer Village of Golden Days	42	32	76.19%	10	23.81%	0	0	Yes
Summer Village of Gull Lake	71	57	81.43%	13	18.57%	1	1	Yes
Summer Village of Horseshoe Bay	19	13	68.42%	6	31.58%	0	0	Yes
Summer Village of Larkspur	2	1	50.00%	1	50.00%	0	0	N/A
Summer Village of Parkland Beach	32	22	70.97%	9	29.03%	1	1	Yes
Summer Village of Silver Beach	5	5	100.00%	0	0.00%	0	0	Yes
Summer Village of Sundance Beach	18	11	61.11%	7	38.89%	0	0	Yes
Summer Village of Waiparous	18	12	70.59%	5	29.41%	1	0	Yes
Sundre	885	638	75.50%	207	24.50%	40	40	Yes
Swan Hills	413	314	78.11%	88	21.89%	11	11	Yes
Sylvan Lake	3,448	2,611	77.94%	739	22.06%	98	94	Yes
Taber	2,081	1,520	81.28%	350	18.72%	211	208	Yes
Thorhild County	1,147	890	81.28%	205	18.72%	52	51	Yes
Thorsby	400	278	71.10%	113	28.90%	9	9	Yes
Three Hills	1,101	840	79.17%	221	20.83%	40	38	Yes
Tofield	409	281	69.38%	124	30.62%	4	2	Yes
Trochu	354	269	79.59%	69	20.41%	16	15	Yes
Turner Valley	731	480	68.77%	218	31.23%	33	31	Yes
Two Hills	279	179	72.76%	67	27.24%	33	33	Yes
Valleyview	447	315	73.09%	116	26.91%	16	16	Yes
Vauxhall	173	122	73.05%	45	26.95%	6	2	Yes
Vegreville	1,760	1,173	72.18%	452	27.82%	135	128	Yes
Vermilion	1,158	882	76.17%	276	23.83%	0	0	Yes
Veteran	56	48	88.89%	6	11.11%	2	1	Yes
Viking	381	257	76.26%	80	23.74%	44	31	Yes
Vilna	72	48	66.67%	24	33.33%	0	0	Yes
Vulcan	454	337	75.73%	108	24.27%	9	8	Yes
Vulcan County	826	708	86.76%	108	13.24%	10	9	Yes
Wainwright	1,619	1,128	73.73%	402	26.27%	89	79	Yes
Warburg	176	133	79.17%	35	20.83%	8	8	Yes
Warner	184	125	75.76%	40	24.24%	19	18	Yes
Waskatenau	35	29	82.86%	6	17.14%	0	0	Yes
Wembley	273	212	79.40%	55	20.60%	6	6	Yes
Westlock	1,173	795	71.17%	322	28.83%	56	53	Yes
Westlock County	1,988	1,558	80.52%	377	19.48%	53	52	Yes
Wetaskiwin	3,422	2,167	69.06%	971	30.94%	284	259	Yes
Wheatland County	2,106	1,690	83.05%	345	16.95%	71	56	Yes
Whitecourt	2,131	1,620	80.80%	385	19.20%	126	122	Yes
Woodlands County	1,606	1,324	83.96%	253	16.04%	29	26	Yes
Yellowhead County	3,061	2,466	82.45%	525	17.55%	70	68	Yes
Youngstown	38	35	94.59%	2	5.41%	1	0	Yes
Provincial Total	1,092,639	642,501	61.68%	399,169	38.32%	50,969	49,336	Yes

=== Daylight Saving Time ===
Year-round daylight saving time
Choice	Votes	%
Yes	531,782	49.76
No	536,874	50.24
Total	1,068,656	100.00
Registered voters/turnout	2,822,303	38.73

Results of the 2021 Referendum on Daylight Savings Time by Municipality
County/Municipality	Number of Electors	Yes	%	No	%	Rejected Ballots	Blank Ballots	Yes/no
Acme	137	78	56.93%	59	43.07%	0	0	Yes
Airdrie	12,029	6,215	52.35%	5,656	47.65%	158	154	Yes
Alberta Beach	255	123	48.81%	129	51.19%	3	3	No
Alix	215	138	64.79%	75	35.21%	2	2	Yes
Alliance	78	54	69.23%	24	30.77%	0	0	Yes
Amisk	60	33	56.90%	25	43.10%	2	1	Yes
Andrew	150	85	60.28%	56	39.72%	9	7	Yes
Arrowwood	71	39	56.52%	30	43.48%	2	2	Yes
Athabasca	730	391	55.62%	312	44.38%	27	15	Yes
Athabasca County	2,232	1,350	61.90%	831	38.10%	51	40	Yes
Banff	2,093	848	42.23%	1,160	57.77%	85	81	No
Barnwell	213	114	54.55%	95	45.45%	4	4	Yes
Barons	107	75	73.53%	27	26.47%	5	5	Yes
Barrhead	1,366	719	55.22%	583	44.78%	64	48	Yes
Bashaw	318	164	52.73%	147	47.27%	7	6	Yes
Bassano	427	226	53.94%	193	46.06%	8	8	Yes
Bawlf	84	48	57.83%	35	42.17%	1	1	Yes
Beaumont	4,578	2,174	49.22%	2,243	50.78%	161	161	No
Beaver County	1,462	797	55.58%	637	44.42%	28	26	Yes
Beaverlodge	486	230	48.12%	248	51.88%	8	3	No
Beiseker	243	137	57.32%	102	42.68%	4	2	Yes
Bentley	309	178	59.33%	122	40.67%	9	9	Yes
Berwyn	67	38	56.72%	29	43.28%	0	0	Yes
Big Lakes County	1,353	806	60.56%	525	39.44%	22	17	Yes
Big Valley	145	81	56.64%	62	43.36%	2	2	Yes
Birch Hills County	365	203	57.18%	152	42.82%	10	10	Yes
Bittern Lake	80	42	54.55%	35	45.45%	3	3	Yes
Black Diamond	859	465	55.23%	377	44.77%	17	17	Yes
Blackfalds	1,417	850	59.99%	567	40.01%	0	0	Yes
Bon Accord	361	190	53.52%	165	46.48%	6	3	Yes
Bonnyville	1,290	823	65.42%	435	34.58%	32	29	Yes
Bow Island	304	176	58.09%	127	41.91%	1	1	Yes
Bowden	368	211	59.44%	144	40.56%	13	10	Yes
Boyle	250	143	58.61%	101	41.39%	6	6	Yes
Brazeau County	2,670	1,530	58.35%	1,092	41.65%	48	44	Yes
Breton	166	90	57.32%	67	42.68%	9	6	Yes
Brooks	2,555	1,338	54.35%	1,124	45.65%	93	82	Yes
Bruderheim	203	127	62.87%	75	37.13%	1	0	Yes
Buffalo Lake Métis Settlement	44	22	50.00%	22	50.00%	0	0	N/A
Calgary	392,780	187,286	48.49%	198,957	51.51%	6,537	6,351	No
Calmar	552	292	54.07%	248	45.93%	12	12	Yes
Camrose	5,288	2,749	53.08%	2,430	46.92%	109	107	Yes
Camrose County	2,293	1,164	51.71%	1,087	48.29%	42	30	Yes
Canmore	4,838	1,666	35.46%	3,032	64.54%	140	140	No
Carbon	235	145	63.60%	83	36.40%	7	1	Yes
Cardston	1,306	736	57.82%	537	42.18%	33	32	Yes
Cardston County	1,338	807	61.74%	500	38.26%	31	27	Yes
Carmangay	119	54	47.79%	59	52.21%	6	4	No
Caroline	96	56	60.22%	37	39.78%	3	3	Yes
Carstairs	1,214	683	57.06%	514	42.94%	17	17	Yes
Castor	309	157	52.68%	141	47.32%	11	8	Yes
Champion	125	64	52.03%	59	47.97%	2	0	Yes
Chauvin	142	100	71.43%	40	28.57%	2	1	Yes
Chestermere	4,731	2,479	53.79%	2,130	46.21%	122	121	Yes
Chipman	108	56	53.33%	49	46.67%	3	3	Yes
Claresholm	1,469	746	52.65%	671	47.35%	52	50	Yes
Clear Hills County	602	315	53.39%	275	46.61%	12	11	Yes
Clearwater County	3,678	2,082	57.91%	1,513	42.09%	83	71	Yes
Clive	186	106	57.61%	78	42.39%	2	1	Yes
Clyde	63	28	45.16%	34	54.84%	1	1	No
Coaldale	2,862	1,588	58.75%	1,115	41.25%	159	159	Yes
Coalhurst	632	345	56.10%	270	43.90%	17	8	Yes
Cochrane	6,844	3,225	47.96%	3,499	52.04%	120	119	No
Cold Lake	2,737	1,802	66.86%	893	33.14%	42	42	Yes
Consort	216	142	69.95%	61	30.05%	13	10	Yes
Coronation	293	167	58.19%	120	41.81%	6	5	Yes
County of Barrhead No. 11	1,678	869	53.05%	769	46.95%	40	34	Yes
County of Forty Mile No. 8	399	216	54.68%	179	45.32%	4	3	Yes
County of Grande Prairie No. 1	4,914	2,294	47.44%	2,542	52.56%	78	59	No
County of Minburn No. 27	719	418	60.76%	270	39.24%	31	31	Yes
County of Newell	1,528	731	48.64%	772	51.36%	25	23	No
County of Northern Lights	713	406	57.67%	298	42.33%	9	7	Yes
County of Paintearth No. 18	446	236	53.76%	203	46.24%	7	6	Yes
County of St. Paul No. 19	2,495	1,484	61.15%	943	38.85%	68	67	Yes
County of Stettler No. 6	1,877	945	51.25%	899	48.75%	33	31	Yes
County of Two Hills No. 21	950	556	58.59%	393	41.41%	1	1	Yes
County of Vermilion River	2,326	1,441	63.12%	842	36.88%	43	30	Yes
County of Warner No. 5	428	230	54.89%	189	45.11%	9	8	Yes
County of Wetaskiwin No. 10	2,710	1,448	54.01%	1,233	45.99%	29	29	Yes
Coutts	74	43	59.72%	29	40.28%	2	2	Yes
Cowley	48	33	68.75%	15	31.25%	0	0	Yes
Cremona	144	77	56.20%	60	43.80%	7	4	Yes
Crossfield	550	318	58.46%	226	41.54%	6	6	Yes
Crowsnest Pass	1,749	985	57.47%	729	42.53%	35	27	Yes
Cypress County	1,809	1,226	68.72%	558	31.28%	25	23	Yes
Czar	79	50	64.94%	27	35.06%	2	2	Yes
Daysland	317	183	58.47%	130	41.53%	4	4	Yes
Delburne	170	112	65.88%	58	34.12%	0	0	Yes
Delia	53	28	52.83%	25	47.17%	0	0	Yes
Devon	2,177	1,037	48.37%	1,107	51.63%	33	32	No
Didsbury	1,667	827	52.34%	753	47.66%	87	85	Yes
Donalda	95	59	65.56%	31	34.44%	5	4	Yes
Donnelly	50	25	52.08%	23	47.92%	2	2	Yes
Drayton Valley	1,849	975	55.30%	788	44.70%	86	83	Yes
Drumheller	2,657	1,390	53.26%	1,220	46.74%	47	23	Yes
Duchess	176	97	55.43%	78	44.57%	1	1	Yes
East Prairie Métis Settlement	17	11	64.71%	6	35.29%	0	0	Yes
Eckville	271	142	53.18%	125	46.82%	4	4	Yes
Edberg	54	31	58.49%	22	41.51%	1	0	Yes
Edgerton	147	77	55.00%	63	45.00%	7	2	Yes
Edmonton	235,852	104,187	45.38%	125,408	54.62%	6,257	6,126	No
Edson	1,775	943	54.41%	790	45.59%	42	34	Yes
Elizabeth Métis Settlement	20	16	80.00%	4	20.00%	0	0	Yes
Elk Point	475	267	58.42%	190	41.58%	18	16	Yes
Elnora	91	66	73.33%	24	26.67%	1	1	Yes
Empress	105	71	68.27%	33	31.73%	1	1	Yes
Fairview	428	200	46.73%	228	53.27%	0	0	No
Falher	201	128	65.31%	68	34.69%	5	5	Yes
Fishing Lake Métis Settlement	32	18	58.06%	13	41.94%	1	0	Yes
Flagstaff County	793	389	49.87%	391	50.13%	13	13	No
Foothills County	4,199	2,090	50.33%	2,063	49.67%	46	44	Yes
Foremost	204	120	60.00%	80	40.00%	4	4	Yes
Forestburg	183	95	52.20%	87	47.80%	1	1	Yes
Fort Macleod	726	385	54.15%	326	45.85%	15	14	Yes
Fort Saskatchewan	6,269	2,916	47.48%	3,225	52.52%	128	126	No
Fox Creek	443	194	44.19%	245	55.81%	4	4	No
Gibbons	782	394	51.91%	365	48.09%	23	22	Yes
Girouxville	58	30	52.63%	27	47.37%	1	1	Yes
Glendon	158	102	65.81%	53	34.19%	3	2	Yes
Glenwood	124	61	50.41%	60	49.59%	3	3	Yes
Grande Prairie	9,801	4,140	44.00%	5,269	56.00%	392	213	No
Grimshaw	392	178	45.52%	213	54.48%	1	1	No
Halkirk	39	22	56.41%	17	43.59%	0	0	Yes
Hanna	801	430	54.78%	355	45.22%	16	16	Yes
Hardisty	228	116	50.88%	112	49.12%	0	0	Yes
Hay Lakes	122	61	50.83%	59	49.17%	2	0	Yes
Heisler	29	14	50.00%	14	50.00%	1	1	N/A
High Level	439	263	60.88%	169	39.12%	7	5	Yes
High Prairie	693	360	53.41%	314	46.59%	19	19	Yes
High River	4,241	2,116	51.95%	1,957	48.05%	168	167	Yes
Hill Spring	76	45	60.81%	29	39.19%	2	2	Yes
Hines Creek	110	60	58.82%	42	41.18%	8	8	Yes
Hinton	2,763	1,506	56.07%	1,180	43.93%	77	61	Yes
Holden	109	72	67.29%	35	32.71%	2	2	Yes
Hughenden	95	57	62.64%	34	37.36%	4	4	Yes
Hussar	68	34	50.75%	33	49.25%	1	0	Yes
Improvement District No. 4 (Waterton)	21	6	28.57%	15	71.43%	0	0	No
Innisfail	2,679	1,329	54.33%	1,117	45.67%	233	233	Yes
Innisfree	52	29	55.77%	23	44.23%	0	0	Yes
Irma	168	100	59.52%	68	40.48%	0	0	Yes
Irricana	370	179	48.91%	187	51.09%	4	0	No
Jasper	1,359	611	45.50%	732	54.50%	16	14	No
Killam	213	108	51.43%	102	48.57%	3	3	Yes
Kitscoty	230	149	65.07%	80	34.93%	1	1	Yes
Kneehill County	1,275	646	51.80%	601	48.20%	28	22	Yes
Lac La Biche County	3,219	1,917	61.78%	1,186	38.22%	116	108	Yes
Lac Ste. Anne County	3,044	1,655	56.06%	1,297	43.94%	92	86	Yes
Lacombe	2,464	1,217	50.52%	1,192	49.48%	55	54	Yes
Lacombe County	2,474	1,280	52.52%	1,157	47.48%	37	30	Yes
Lamont	439	235	54.27%	198	45.73%	6	6	Yes
Lamont County	1,144	839	77.11%	249	22.89%	56	52	Yes
Leduc	7,007	3,436	50.22%	3,406	49.78%	165	164	Yes
Leduc County	3,705	1,964	53.90%	1,680	46.10%	61	49	Yes
Legal	379	202	54.30%	170	45.70%	7	7	Yes
Lethbridge	28,293	14,158	51.22%	13,484	48.78%	651	632	Yes
Lethbridge County	1,209	573	48.40%	611	51.60%	25	25	No
Linden	212	111	54.15%	94	45.85%	7	7	Yes
Lloydminster	2,142	1,709	79.79%	433	20.21%	0	0	Yes
Longview	152	83	54.61%	69	45.39%	0	0	Yes
Lougheed	67	33	50.77%	32	49.23%	2	2	Yes
Mackenzie County	1,293	941	74.45%	323	25.55%	29	26	Yes
Magrath	841	498	59.78%	335	40.22%	8	5	Yes
Manning	265	126	48.65%	133	51.35%	6	5	No
Mannville	225	148	66.97%	73	33.03%	4	4	Yes
Marwayne	174	106	60.92%	68	39.08%	0	0	Yes
Mayerthorpe	191	128	67.37%	62	32.63%	1	1	Yes
McLennan	220	113	51.60%	106	48.40%	1	1	Yes
Medicine Hat	19,998	12,113	61.85%	7,473	38.15%	412	409	Yes
Milk River	435	253	59.95%	169	40.05%	13	13	Yes
Millet	505	276	68.32%	128	31.68%	101	101	Yes
Milo	65	36	56.25%	28	43.75%	1	1	Yes
Morinville	2,640	1,384	53.79%	1,189	46.21%	67	62	Yes
Morrin	77	38	49.35%	39	50.65%	0	0	No
Mountain View County	3,850	1,951	51.67%	1,825	48.33%	74	65	Yes
Mundare	352	229	67.35%	111	32.65%	12	12	Yes
Municipal Affairs	314	131	62.38%	79	37.62%	104	2	No
Municipal District of Acadia No. 34	160	117	73.13%	43	26.88%	0	0	Yes
Municipal District of Bighorn No. 8	449	183	41.50%	258	58.50%	8	4	No
Municipal District of Bonnyville No. 87	4,272	2,757	66.51%	1,388	33.49%	127	126	Yes
Municipal District of Fairview No. 136	440	218	51.05%	209	48.95%	13	12	Yes
Municipal District of Greenview No. 16	2,225	1,192	55.06%	973	44.94%	60	56	Yes
Municipal District of Lesser Slave River No. 124	1,009	520	53.17%	458	46.83%	31	29	Yes
Municipal District of Opportunity No. 17	966	513	56.69%	392	43.31%	61	61	Yes
Municipal District of Peace No. 135	222	100	45.87%	118	54.13%	4	4	No
Municipal District of Pincher Creek No. 9	958	443	46.73%	505	53.27%	10	10	No
Municipal District of Provost No. 52	698	432	62.79%	256	37.21%	10	9	Yes
Municipal District of Ranchland No. 66	26	12	46.15%	14	53.85%	0	0	No
Municipal District of Smoky River No. 130	812	425	53.59%	368	46.41%	19	15	Yes
Municipal District of Spirit River No. 133	177	86	49.14%	89	50.86%	2	2	No
Municipal District of Taber	972	490	51.91%	454	48.09%	28	28	Yes
Municipal District of Wainwright No. 61	1,380	756	55.22%	613	44.78%	11	11	Yes
Municipal District of Willow Creek No. 26	1,342	701	53.15%	618	46.85%	23	22	Yes
Munson	94	45	48.39%	48	51.61%	1	1	No
Myrnam	61	32	54.24%	27	45.76%	2	2	Yes
Nampa	86	49	58.33%	35	41.67%	2	2	Yes
Nanton	774	378	49.67%	383	50.33%	13	12	No
Nobleford	260	137	52.69%	123	47.31%	0	0	Yes
Northern Sunrise County	494	267	54.38%	224	45.62%	3	3	Yes
Okotoks	7,523	3,523	47.67%	3,868	52.33%	132	129	No
Olds	2,361	1,167	51.18%	1,113	48.82%	81	81	Yes
Onoway	476	252	53.73%	217	46.27%	7	7	Yes
Oyen	201	124	62.63%	74	37.37%	3	3	Yes
Paddle Prairie Métis Settlement	8	6	75.00%	2	25.00%	0	0	Yes
Paradise Valley	39	24	61.54%	15	38.46%	0	0	Yes
Parkland County	7,836	3,897	50.89%	3,761	49.11%	178	177	Yes
Peace River	1,884	847	46.11%	990	53.89%	47	39	No
Peavine Métis Settlement	45	28	62.22%	17	37.78%	0	0	Yes
Penhold	834	396	51.56%	372	48.44%	66	66	Yes
Picture Butte	225	94	42.53%	127	57.47%	4	2	No
Pincher Creek	1,213	587	48.92%	613	51.08%	13	10	No
Ponoka	1,606	827	53.11%	730	46.89%	49	49	Yes
Ponoka County	2,320	1,197	52.04%	1,103	47.96%	20	19	Yes
Provost	621	449	72.42%	171	27.58%	1	1	Yes
Rainbow Lake	59	37	62.71%	22	37.29%	0	0	Yes
Raymond	1,477	861	58.49%	611	41.51%	5	2	Yes
Red Deer	21,750	11,523	54.60%	9,580	45.40%	647	641	Yes
Red Deer County	6,020	3,134	53.02%	2,777	46.98%	109	80	Yes
Redcliff	1,377	859	63.68%	490	36.32%	28	26	Yes
Redwater	647	373	57.65%	274	42.35%	0	0	Yes
Regional Municipality of Wood Buffalo	12,616	7,497	61.69%	4,656	38.31%	463	447	Yes
Rimbey	704	416	59.94%	278	40.06%	10	7	Yes
Rocky Mountain House	1,707	966	57.84%	704	42.16%	37	34	Yes
Rocky View County	11,540	5,505	48.56%	5,831	51.44%	204	171	No
Rockyford	115	67	59.29%	46	40.71%	2	2	Yes
Rosalind	67	33	49.25%	34	50.75%	0	0	No
Rosemary	112	62	55.86%	49	44.14%	1	1	Yes
Rycroft	159	96	60.38%	63	39.62%	0	0	Yes
Ryley	178	118	67.43%	57	32.57%	3	3	Yes
Saddle Hills County	727	347	48.74%	365	51.26%	15	13	No
Sedgewick	323	145	45.45%	174	54.55%	4	4	No
Sexsmith	467	215	46.34%	249	53.66%	3	3	No
Slave Lake	1,440	754	52.47%	683	47.53%	3	0	Yes
Smoky Lake	487	271	60.63%	176	39.37%	40	40	Yes
Smoky Lake County	1,035	558	58.13%	402	41.88%	75	74	Yes
Spirit River	250	135	54.88%	111	45.12%	4	4	Yes
Spring Lake	175	96	55.81%	76	44.19%	3	0	Yes
Spruce Grove	7,960	3,827	49.03%	3,978	50.97%	155	153	No
St. Albert	17,826	7,374	42.35%	10,038	57.65%	414	408	No
St. Paul	1,367	782	61.14%	497	38.86%	88	36	Yes
Standard	123	81	66.94%	40	33.06%	2	2	Yes
Starland County	543	279	53.86%	239	46.14%	25	13	Yes
Stavely	194	102	56.04%	80	43.96%	12	12	Yes
Stettler	1,362	704	52.97%	625	47.03%	33	15	Yes
Stirling	208	135	65.22%	72	34.78%	1	0	Yes
Stony Plain	4,327	2,127	51.19%	2,028	48.81%	172	126	Yes
Strathcona County	30,501	13,657	45.72%	16,213	54.28%	631	624	No
Strathmore	3,631	1,778	50.93%	1,713	49.07%	140	139	Yes
Sturgeon County	4,554	2,198	49.28%	2,262	50.72%	94	93	No
Summer Village of Burnstick Lake	7	4	57.14%	3	42.86%	0	0	Yes
Summer Village of Golden Days	42	21	50.00%	21	50.00%	0	0	N/A
Summer Village of Gull Lake	71	36	51.43%	34	48.57%	1	1	Yes
Summer Village of Horseshoe Bay	19	12	63.16%	7	36.84%	0	0	Yes
Summer Village of Larkspur	2	1	50.00%	1	50.00%	0	0	N/A
Summer Village of Parkland Beach	32	15	46.88%	17	53.13%	0	0	No
Summer Village of Silver Beach	5	2	40.00%	3	60.00%	0	0	No
Summer Village of Sundance Beach	18	4	22.22%	14	77.78%	0	0	No
Summer Village of Waiparous	17	5	31.25%	11	68.75%	1	0	No
Sundre	885	500	57.87%	364	42.13%	21	21	Yes
Swan Hills	413	254	62.41%	153	37.59%	6	6	Yes
Sylvan Lake	3,448	1,887	55.80%	1,495	44.20%	66	62	Yes
Taber	2,081	1,179	59.55%	801	40.45%	101	101	Yes
Thorhild County	1,147	634	56.16%	495	43.84%	18	16	Yes
Thorsby	400	203	51.13%	194	48.87%	3	3	Yes
Three Hills	1,101	604	57.20%	452	42.80%	45	24	Yes
Tofield	409	213	52.85%	190	47.15%	6	5	Yes
Trochu	354	176	50.43%	173	49.57%	5	4	Yes
Turner Valley	731	379	53.61%	328	46.39%	24	20	Yes
Two Hills	279	163	61.05%	104	38.95%	12	12	Yes
Valleyview	447	238	55.09%	194	44.91%	15	15	Yes
Vauxhall	173	84	49.70%	85	50.30%	4	2	No
Vegreville	1,760	995	58.22%	714	41.78%	51	47	Yes
Vermilion	1,204	677	56.23%	527	43.77%	0	0	Yes
Veteran	56	41	73.21%	15	26.79%	0	0	Yes
Viking	381	212	59.05%	147	40.95%	22	9	Yes
Vilna	72	48	66.67%	24	33.33%	0	0	Yes
Vulcan	454	246	54.79%	203	45.21%	5	4	Yes
Vulcan County	826	375	45.90%	442	54.10%	9	7	No
Wainwright	1,619	962	60.69%	623	39.31%	34	24	Yes
Warburg	176	108	61.71%	67	38.29%	1	1	Yes
Warner	184	114	66.28%	58	33.72%	12	11	Yes
Waskatenau	35	22	62.86%	13	37.14%	0	0	Yes
Wembley	273	133	49.26%	137	50.74%	3	3	No
Westlock	1,173	656	56.94%	496	43.06%	21	17	Yes
Westlock County	1,987	1,052	53.65%	909	46.35%	26	24	Yes
Wetaskiwin	3,422	1,740	54.98%	1,425	45.02%	257	234	Yes
Wheatland County	2,106	1,051	51.39%	994	48.61%	61	46	Yes
Whitecourt	2,131	1,084	52.75%	971	47.25%	76	73	Yes
Woodlands County	1,606	868	54.56%	723	45.44%	15	9	Yes
Yellowhead County	3,061	1,812	60.16%	1,200	39.84%	49	47	Yes
Youngstown	38	12	33.33%	24	66.67%	2	1	No
Provincial Total	1,092,960	531,782	49.76%	536,874	50.24%	24,304	22,907	No

== See also ==
- 2021 Canadian electoral calendar
