= Little Red Deer River =

River in Alberta, Canada

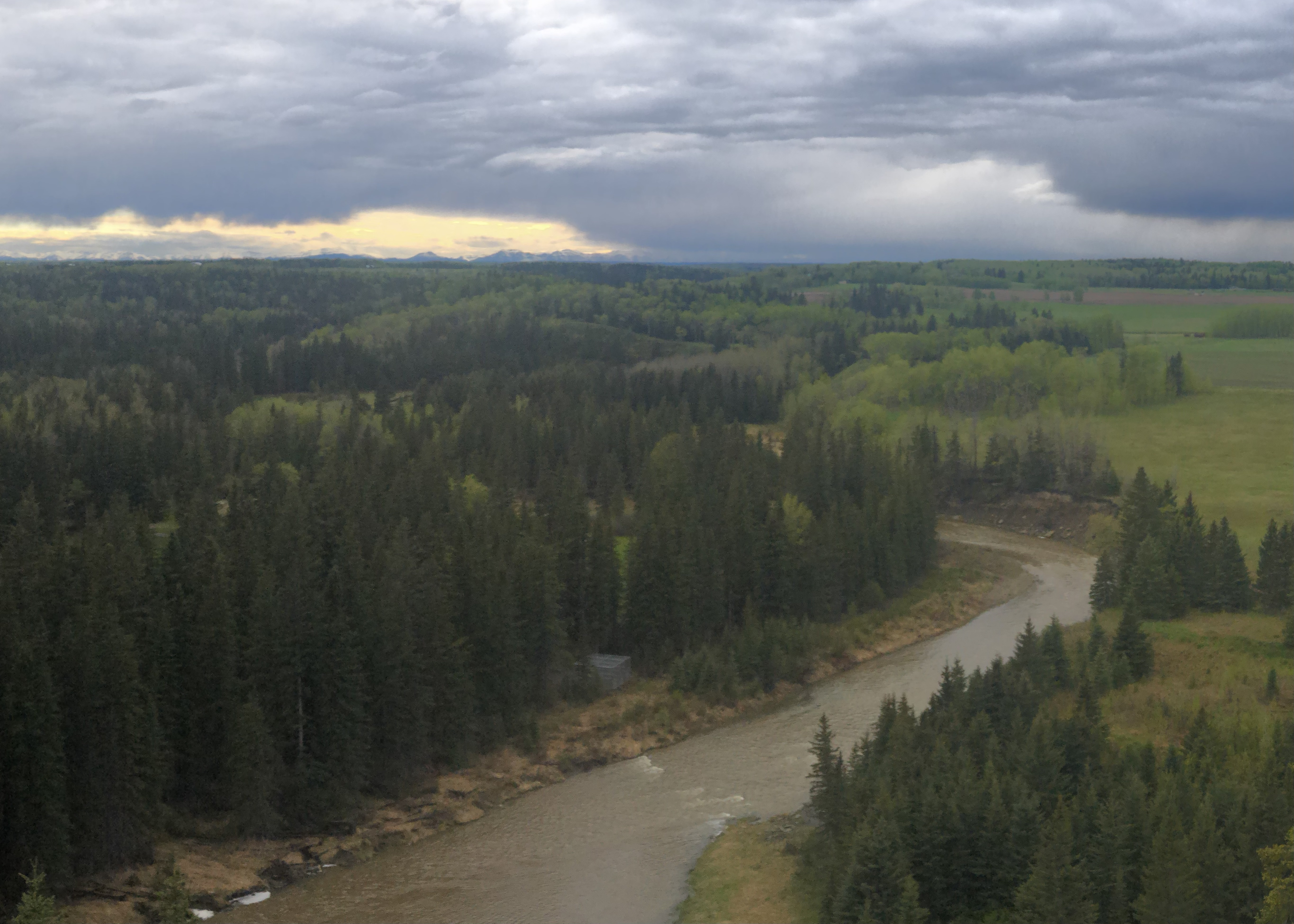
- Little Red Deer River near Harmattan

Location
- Country: Canada

Physical characteristics
- Source
  - location: Waiparous Creek, Waiparous Valley
  - coordinates: 51°24′41.1″N 115°05′21″W
- Mouth
  - location: Red Deer River near Innisfail
  - coordinates: 52°03′44″N 114°07′24.9″W
- Length: 315.36 km (195.96 mi)
- Basin size: 3,689 km^{2} (1,424 sq mi)

The Little Red Deer River, sometimes referred to by the acronym LRD or LRDR, is a medium-sized river in Alberta, Canada. It is a tributary of the larger Red Deer River.

== History ==
The name Little Red Deer River appears in use since the Palliser Expedition from 1857 to 1860. In 1904, after the discovery of coal, the town Skunk Hollow sprung into being along the banks of the Little Red Deer about 7 km (4.3 mi) west of Water Valley. At its peak the town had close to 100 inhabitants, a post office, wash house, dance hall, and a school. After the mine closed in the 1920s, the town was abandoned virtually overnight. In 1948, development began for Red Lodge Provincial Park along the banks of the Little Red Deer. The park was established and opened in 1951. During the late 50s, there was a plan to create a reservoir on the Little Red Deer, although this never came to fruition. The river has seen multiple floods of varying severity including in 1929, 1952, 2005, 2013, 2014, 2018, 2020, and 2022.

== Course ==
The Little Red Deer River starts as a very small stream flowing from Waiparous Creek. From here it flows in a northeastern direction, eventually growing in size to be 6 m (20 ft) in width along the Harold Creek Road. Heading further east, the river crosses Range Road 52 about 3 km (1.9 mi) north of Water Valley where the Water Valley Campground is on either side of the river, which is now 23 m (75 ft) in width. The river flows further northeast, crossing Township Road 301A 3 km (1.9 mi) west of Cremona before continuing north to Elkton, with the Elkton Valley Campground being on its east bank. Further north, the river crosses Township Road 320 near Shantz before continuing north into the community of Westward Ho where the Westward Ho Campground is on its west bank, and where the Cowboy Trail crosses the river. The river then flows east for 13 km (8.1 mi) north of Harmattan before continuing in a northeast direction, crossing Township Road 332, Highway 766, and Highway 587 before reaching Red Lodge Provincial Park. The river heads east for 8 km (5.0 mi) and then flows north past the unincorporated community of Oklahoma before continuing northeast, flowing into the Red Deer River. The river flows through the municipal districts of Mountain View County, Red Deer County, Rocky View County, and the MD of Bighorn No. 8.

== Tributaries ==
- Grease Creek
- Harold Creek
- Silver Creek
- Graham Creek
- Big Prairie Creek
- Dogpound Creek
- Loblaw Creek
- Salter Creek
- Stony Creek
- Beaverdam Creek
- Silver Lagoon
- Mill Creek

== Fish species ==
Native sport fish in the Little Red Deer are Mountain whitefish (by far the most abundant), Burbot, Northern pike, Walleye, and Bull trout. The Little Red Deer has seen many introductions in its history, the most successful being the Brown trout and Brook trout. The river has been stocked with Lake whitefish on at least one occasion, although this population is no longer in any large numbers, if still present at all. Non-sport fish in the river are Brook stickleback, Lake chub, Longnose dace, Longnose sucker, White sucker, and Trout-perch. The invasive Prussian carp has been found in at least one tributary of the river so far.

== See also ==
- List of rivers of Alberta
