= Chinook's Edge School Division No. 73 =

School district in Alberta, Canada

Chinook's Edge School Division No. 73 Chinook's Edge Board of Education

Location
- 4904 – 50 Street; Innisfail, Alberta, Canada Canada

Other information
- Website: www.cesd73.ca

Chinook's Edge School Division No. 73 or the Chinook's Edge Board of Education is a public school authority within the Canadian province of Alberta operated out of Innisfail.

== Schools ==
- Beacon Hill Elementary School, Sylvan Lake (K-6)
- Bowden Grandview School, Bowden (K-12)
- Carstairs Elementary School, Carstairs (K-4)
- C.P. Blakely Elementary School, Sylvan Lake (K-6)
- Cremona School, Cremona (K-12)
- Delburne Centralized School, Delburne (K-12)
- Didsbury High School, Didsbury (9-12)
- École Deer Meadow School, Olds (5-8)
- École Fox Run School, Sylvan Lake (7-8)
- École H.J. Cody High School, Sylvan Lake (9-12)
- École John Wilson Elementary School, Innisfail (PK-4)
- École Olds Elementary School, Olds (PK-4)
- École Olds High School, Olds (9-12)
- École Steffie Woima Elementary School, Sylvan Lake (PK-6)
- Elnora School, Elnora (K-8)
- Hugh Sutherland School, Carstairs (5-12)
- Innisfail High School, Innisfail (9-12)
- Innisfail Middle School, Innisfail (5-8)
- Jessie Duncan Elementary School, Penhold (PK-3)
- Olds Koinonia Christian School, Olds (K-12)
- Penhold Crossing Secondary School, Penhold (9-12)
- Penhold Waskasoo Middle School, Penhold (4-8)
- Poplar Ridge School, Red Deer County (K-6)
- Reed Ranch School, Mountain View County (K-6)
- River Valley School, Sundre (K-8)
- Ross Ford Elementary School, Didsbury (K-4)
- Spruce View School, Spruce View (K-12)
- Sundre High School, Sundre (9-12)
- Sundre Learning Center, Sundre

=== Colony Schools (K-9) ===
- May City Colony School, Olds
- Neudorf Colony School, Crossfield
- Rainbow Colony School, Innisfail
- Pine Hill Colony School, Red Deer County

== See also ==
- List of school authorities in Alberta
