= Westward Ho, Alberta =

Westward Ho
- Location of Westward Ho in Alberta
- Coordinates: 51°47′24″N 114°31′16″W
- Country: Canada
- Province: Alberta
- Region: Southern Alberta
- Census division: 6
- Municipal district: Mountain View County

Government
  - Reeve: Bruce Beattie
  - Governing body: Mountain View County Council: Angela Aalbers; Bruce Beattie; Kenneth Heck; Al Kemmere; Patricia McKean; Duncan Milne; Jeremy Sayer
- Elevation: 1,055 m (3,461 ft)
- Time zone: UTC-7 (MST)
- Postal code: T0M 1X0
- Area code: +1-403
- Highways: Highway 22; Highway 27

Westward Ho is an unincorporated community in Alberta, Canada within Mountain View County. It is located approximately 50 kilometers northwest of Calgary, just west of the intersections of Highway 22 and Highway 27 between Olds and Sundre. There is a general store with a gas bar also located here.

Across the highway is a 300 site campground also called Westward Ho with a hall, washrooms, baseball diamonds, beach, playgrounds and many private sites.

Much of Westward Ho (town/campground) is located on the Little Red Deer River.

== See also ==
- List of communities in Alberta
