= Bergen, Alberta =

Community in Alberta, Canada

Coordinates: 51°42′29″N 114°37′57″W

Location of Bergen in Alberta

Bergen is an unincorporated community in the northwest quadrant of Mountain View County, Alberta, Canada. The community and its surrounding rural area is recognized as a rural neighbourhood by Mountain View County under the same name. Bergen is a known name to many sculptors around the world because it hosts their work, which are made locally by them during an annual "symposium."

The community is located twelve kilometres (7.5 mi) south of Sundre, at the southern terminus of Highway 760. Most services for the community are found in Sundre. The farming and ranching community lies in the Canadian Rockies foothills, at an elevation of 1,140 metres (3,740 ft). The Fallentimber Creek, a tributary of the Red Deer River, flows through the community.

It is named for the city of Bergen in Norway. The name derives from "Bjørgvin", meaning meadow between the mountains.

The settlement was established in 1907 by J.T. Johannesen and a group of Norwegian settlers. A post office was opened in November 1907, with Johannesen serving as postmaster. It was closed in 1970.

A community hall is located in Bergen.

The community was hit by an EF2 tornado on July 7, 2022. It injured one person while damaging or destroying many homes and snapping trees.
