= Chinook's Edge School Division =

School district in Alberta, Canada

Chinook's Edge School Division No. 73 (CESD) is a school district headquartered in Innisfail, Alberta.

== Schools ==
- Bowden: Bowden Grandview School
- Carstairs:
  - Carstairs Elementary School
  - Hugh Sutherland School
  - Neudorf Hutterite
- Cremona: Cremona School
- Delburne: Delburne School
- Didsbury:
  - Didsbury High School
  - Didsbury Career High School
  - Ross Ford Elementary School
  - Westglen School
- Elnora: Elnora School
- Innisfail:
  - École Innisfail High School
  - École Innisfail Middle School
  - École John Wilson Elementary
  - Innisfail Career High School
  - Rainbow Colony School
- Olds
  - École Deer Meadow School
  - École Olds Elementary School
  - Horizon School
  - Off Campus Learning Centre
  - Olds Career High School
  - Olds High School
  - Olds Koinonia Christian School
  - Reed Ranch School
- Penhold
  - Jessie Duncan School
  - Penhold Elementary School
  - Penhold Crossing Secondary School
- Red Deer County
  - Gasoline Alley Career High School
  - Pine Hill Hutterite School
  - Poplar Ridge School
- Spruce View: Spruce View School
- Sundre:
  - River Valley School
  - Sundre High School
  - Sundre Learning Center
- Sylvan Lake
  - Beacon Hill Elementary School
  - C. P. Blakely School
  - École H. J. Cody School
  - École Fox Run School
  - École Steffie Woima Elementary School
  - Sylvan Lake Career High School
