= Stirlingville =

Stirlingville can mean:

- Stirlingville, Alberta, a hamlet
- Stirlingville, Michigan, an unincorporated community
