= Elkton, Alberta =

Coordinates: 51°39′00″N 114°31′41″W

Location of Elkton Alberta

Elkton is an unincorporated community in central Alberta in Mountain View County, located 2 kilometres (1.2 mi) west of the Cowboy Trail, 54 kilometres (34 mi) northwest of Airdrie, between the towns of Sundre and Cremona.

Located in the Canadian Rockies foothills, at an elevation of 1,120 meters (3,670 ft), on the banks of the Little Red Deer River, Elkton is a predominantly ranching community.

A post office was operational in Elkton from June 1907 to March 1969. A community hall is established in the settlement.
