= Stirlingville, Alberta =

Stirlingville
- Locality
- Interactive map of Stirlingville
- Coordinates: 51°33′34″N 113°42′34″W
- Country: Canada
- Province: Alberta
- Region: Central Alberta
- Census division: 6
- Municipal district: Mountain View County

Government
  - Governing body: Mountain View County Council
- Elevation: 935 m (3,068 ft)
- Time zone: UTC-7 (MST)
- Postal codes
- Area code: +1-403
- Highways: Highway 581

Stirlingville is an unincorporated community in central Alberta, Canada. It is located within Mountain View County on Highway 581, approximately 27 km (17 mi) east of the Town of Carstairs.

== See also ==
- List of communities in Alberta
