= Blake Reid =

- Born: Cremona, Alberta, Canada
- Genres: Country
- Occupation: Singer-songwriter
- Years active: 2012–present
- Labels: Royalty
- Website: blakereidband.com

Blake Reid (born and raised in Cremona, Alberta) is a Canadian country music and roots singer-songwriter. To date he has released 2 albums as a solo artist.

== Career ==
Reid's first album 'Against the Grain' was released independently in 2012. Reid released 'Rust' in 2015, distributed by Sony Music Canada. In 2017, he formed the 'Blake Reid Band' and is featured in the award-winning full-length film/music documentary 'No Roads In' with respective 'No Roads In' album set to be released 2018. Reid has been touring throughout 2018. Their film and album were created in High River Alberta, Canada (in an old, unused farm house).

== Style ==
Some of Reid's music reflects his Alberta roots, particularly the song 'Fuel, Fertilizer and John Deere'

== Discography ==
=== Studio albums ===
Title	Details
Rust	Release Date: 30 October 2015; Label: Royalty Records
Against The Grain	Release Date: 17 August 2012; Label: Harvest Music

=== Singles ===
Year	Title	Album
2012	"After The Rain"	Against The Grain
2012	"Take Me Back"	Against The Grain
2012	"Fuel Fertilizer and Deere"	Against The Grain
2015	"Sounds Like a Song"	Rust
2015	"Stay Home"	Rust
2015	"Cowboys Were Kings"	Rust
2015	"Rust"	Rust

=== Music videos ===
Year	Video	Director
2015	"Stay Home"	Eppo Erkes

=== Film ===
Year	Video	Director
2017	"No Roads In"	Josh Wong
