= Bearberry, Alberta =

Human settlement in Alberta, Canada

Coordinates: 51°51′14″N 114°55′23″W

Location of Bearberry Alberta

Bearberry is an unincorporated community in central Alberta in Mountain View County, located 18 kilometres (11 mi) west of Highway 22, 107 kilometres (66 mi) northwest of Calgary. It is named for the bearberry that grows in the vicinity.

There was a major forest fire, the Dogrib Fire, in 2001, which threatened the community. In 2003, a major bridge was reconstructed in Bearberry. Shell Oil has a plant near the community. "Sour gas" is mined in and around Bearberry.

It is a tourist destination with snowmobile trails, and is also the site of a bed and breakfast. The area west of the community is described as "pristine wilderness area [that] is also home to the bear, wolf and cougar whose prey includes wild horses."
