= Red Lodge Provincial Park =

Provincial park in Alberta, Canada

- IUCN category IV (habitat/species management area)
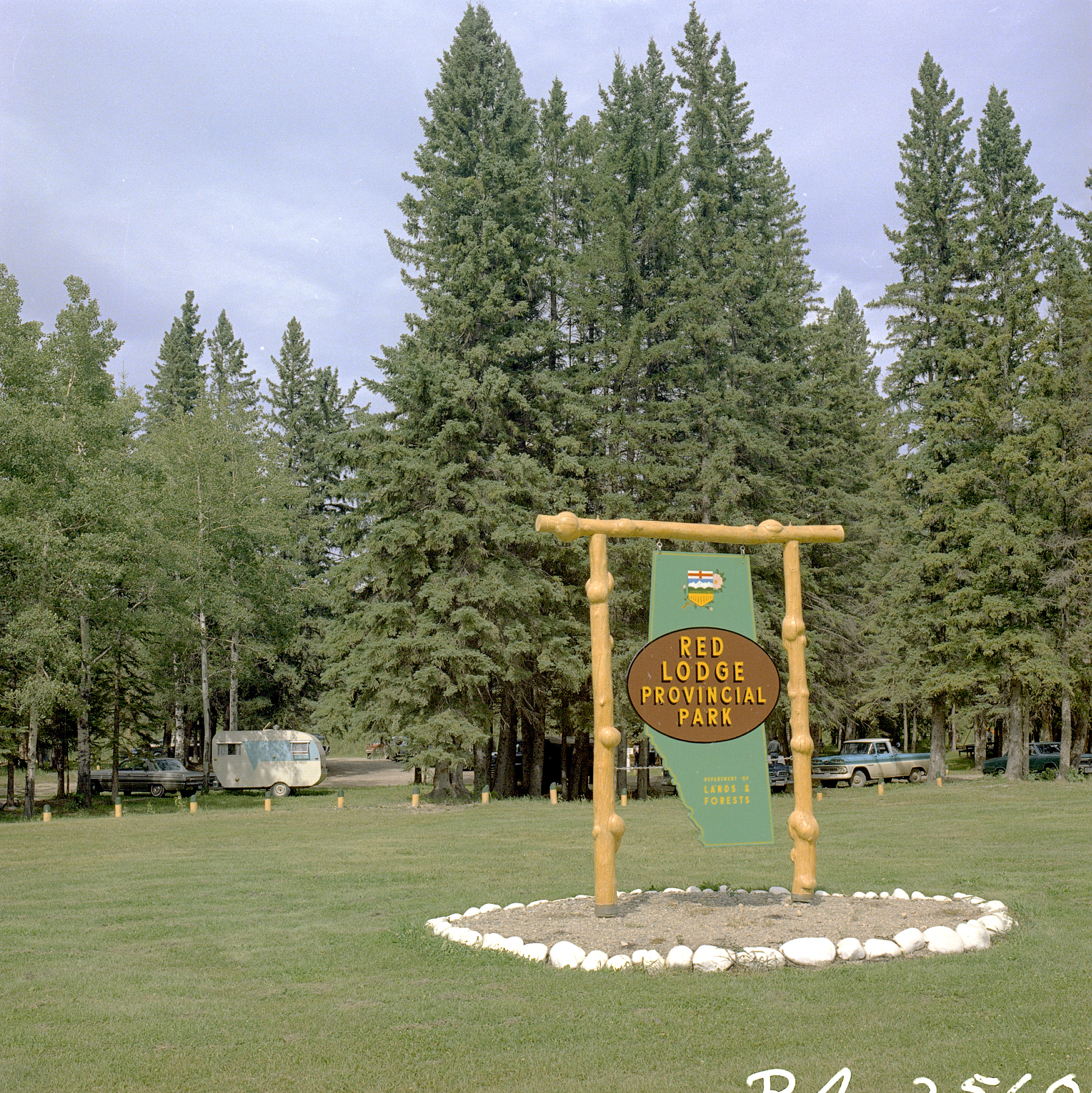
- The entrance to Red Lodge Provincial Park in 1966

- Location within Alberta
- Interactive map of Red Lodge Provincial Park
- Location: Red Deer County, Alberta, Canada
- Nearest city: Red Deer
- Coordinates: 51°56′34.6″N 114°14′28.8″W
- Area: 129 ha (320 acres)
- Established: May 7, 1951
- Visitors: 3,914 (in 2005-2006)
- Governing body: Alberta Tourism, Parks and Recreation

Red Lodge Provincial Park is a provincial park located in Alberta, Canada. The park is approximately 14 kilometres (8.7 mi) west of the town of Bowden. It is located on the north side of Alberta Highway 587 with the Little Red Deer River flowing directly through it.

== History ==
The park earns its name from a large red log house, in the style of an English manor, that was present in the area of the park. It was built for Thomas Critchley during the late 1890s. When Critchley and his family arrived, he was disappointed with the surrounding areas lack of houses of similar elegance, and subsequently left and travelled back to England in 1898. In the early 20th century, the area began to be used as a picnic area by settlers. During the 1920s a sports field was built there by a committee formed by locals, known as the Bowden Park Board. When the committee heard that someone planned to purchase the land, they requested the land be reserved as a park by the provincial government. 30 hectares was reserved in 1933, being administrated by the same committee, and was known as Little Red Deer Park. In 1949, (Note: some sources say that development began a year earlier in 1948) Alberta Parks (Note: then known as the Department of Lands and Forests) reserved this land, planning to make it a provincial park. The development for the provincial park was done by the Bowden Chamber of Commerce and Agriculture, being financed by the provincial government. Although formally established in 1951, the park was opened to the public in September 1949, with this opening being attended by 1,500 people. In 1952, power lines were erected in the park, allowing it to be used for outdoor movies. Due to requests for proper swimming facilities made by the committee, a dam was built on the Little Red Deer River, raising the water levels in the park. This dam ended up being damaged and destroyed multiple times in the following years, and as a result, Alberta Parks dismantled it. Up until the turn of the century, camping in the park was only in undesignated sites. Due to the Little Red Deer's frequent flooding, the park has been evacuated and closed multiple times.

== Activities ==
Popular activities in the park include tubing, swimming, fishing, camping, hiking, picnicking, kayaking, canoeing, geocaching, horseshoes, and birdwatching.

== Facilities ==
The park features a campground, with 106 campsites that can fit RVs as well as a group use area. There are also powered campsites. There is a store in the park ran by Alberta Parks that sells camping items as well as refreshments such as ice cream. The park also has a playground, showers, and washrooms with flush toilets. There is also freshwater taps and a sewage disposal facility.

== Flora and Fauna ==
Red Lodge Provincial Park has a unique array of flora and fauna. With its large stands of firs being one of the main features of the park. The park has over 70 species of birds, with common birds in the park including Boreal chickadee, Red-breasted nuthatch, White-throated sparrow, Willow flycatcher, Yellow-bellied sapsucker, and Mallard. Fish in the park include Northern pike and Mountain whitefish. Other common animals in the park include American red squirrel, Snowshoe hare, Western toad, Wood frog, River jewelwing, and Boreal snaketail. Red Lodge also has over 100 recorded species of flowering plants.

== See also ==
- List of provincial parks in Alberta
- List of Canadian provincial parks
- List of National Parks of Canada
