= Eagle Hill, Alberta =

Coordinates: 51°49′37″N 114°22′48″W

Location of Eagle Hill Alberta

Eagle Hill is an unincorporated community in central Alberta, Canada within Mountain View County. It is located 2 km (1.2 mi) north of Highway 27, approximately 36 km (22 mi) southwest of Red Deer. It is reputedly the highest point between Calgary and Edmonton. Its post office first opened in 1904. This community has a CO-OP with gas station and propane, Curling rink, Ball diamonds, a Hall, and a church, Eagle Hill Gospel Mission Church.
