= Grease Creek =

- Location within Alberta
- Etymology: Named for the presence of greasewood in the area

Location
- Country: Canada
- Province: Alberta

Physical characteristics
- Mouth
  - coordinates: 51.45011°N 114.73532°W

Grease Creek is a stream in Alberta, Canada.

Grease Creek was so named on account of greasewood in the area.

== See also ==
- List of rivers of Alberta
