= Cremona, Alberta =

Cremona
- Village
- Village of Cremona
- Motto: Village of TOM ORO
- Location in Alberta
- Coordinates: 51°32′40.8″N 114°29′31.8″W
- Country: Canada
- Province: Alberta
- Region: Central Alberta
- Census division: 6
- Municipal district: Mountain View County
- Incorporated
  - Village: January 1, 1955

Government
  - Mayor: Craig Lamb
  - Governing body: Cremona Village Council
  - MP: William Stevenson, Yellowhead (Cons)
  - MLA: Tara Sawyer, Olds-Didsbury-Three Hills, (UCP)

Area (2021)
  - Land: 1.93 km^{2} (0.75 sq mi)
- Elevation: 1,175 m (3,855 ft)

Population (2021)
  - Total: 437
  - Density: 225.9/km^{2} (585/sq mi)
- Time zone: UTC−06:00 (Alberta Time)
- Postal code span: T0M 0R0
- Highways: Highway 22
- Website: Official website

Cremona /krəˈmoʊnə/ is a village in southern Alberta, Canada. It is located north of Cochrane and west of Carstairs, along the Cowboy Trail (Highway 22).

== Demographics ==
In the 2021 Census of Population conducted by Statistics Canada, the Village of Cremona had a population of 437 living in 194 of its 210 total private dwellings, a change of −1.6% from its 2016 population of 444. With a land area of 1.93 km^{2} (0.75 sq mi), it had a population density of 226.4/km^{2} (586.4/sq mi) in 2021.

In the 2016 Census of Population conducted by Statistics Canada, the Village of Cremona recorded a population of 444 living in 189 of its 204 total private dwellings, a −2.8% change from its 2011 population of 457. With a land area of 1.94 km^{2} (0.75 sq mi), it had a population density of 228.9/km^{2} (592.8/sq mi) in 2016.

== Education ==
Cremona School is a K-12 school within the Chinook's Edge School Division.

== Industry ==
Aurora Cannabis operates a medical marijuana growing and processing facility in Cremona.

== Notable people ==
- Former American Hockey League (AHL) forward and Calgary Flames draft pick J.D. Watt hails from Cremona.
- Country singer Blake Reid was born in Cremona.

== See also ==
- List of communities in Alberta
- List of francophone communities in Alberta
- List of villages in Alberta
