= Division No. 6, Alberta =

Census division in Canada

Coordinates: 50.750°N 113.972°W

Division No. 6
- Census division in Alberta
- Country: Canada
- Province: Alberta

Area
  - Total: 12,646 km^{2} (4,883 sq mi)

Population (2021)
  - Total: 1,590,639
  - Density: 125.78/km^{2} (325.77/sq mi)

Division No. 6 is a census division in Alberta, Canada. It includes the City of Calgary and surrounding areas. The majority of the division consists of Alberta's Calgary Region, while the northern portion of the division includes parts of central Alberta. The division also forms the southern segment of the Calgary–Edmonton Corridor. Division No. 6 is the largest census division in Alberta according to population and also has the highest population density.

== Census subdivisions ==
Historical population
Year	Pop.	±%
1991	804,802	—
1996	880,859	+9.5%
2001	1,021,060	+15.9%
2006	1,160,936	+13.7%
2011	1,311,022	+12.9%
2016	1,498,778	+14.3%
2021	1,590,639	+6.1%

The following census subdivisions (municipalities or municipal equivalents) are located within Alberta's Division No. 6.

- Cities
  - Airdrie
  - Calgary
  - Chestermere
- Towns
  - Carstairs
  - Cochrane
  - Crossfield
  - Didsbury
  - Diamond Valley
  - High River
  - Irricana
  - Okotoks
  - Olds
  - Sundre
- Villages
  - Beiseker
  - Cremona
  - Longview
- Municipal districts
  - Foothills County
  - Mountain View County
  - Rocky View County
- First Nation reserves
  - Eden Valley 216
  - Tsuu T'ina Nation 145

== Demographics ==
In the 2021 Census of Population conducted by Statistics Canada, Division No. 6 had a population of 1,590,639 living in 604,628 of its 638,160 total private dwellings, a change of 6.1% from its 2016 population of 1,498,778. With a land area of 12,614.18 km^{2} (4,870.36 sq mi), it had a population density of 126.1/km^{2} (326.6/sq mi) in 2021.

== See also ==
- List of census divisions of Alberta
- List of communities in Alberta
