= Mountain View County =

Municipal district in Alberta, Canada

- Municipal district
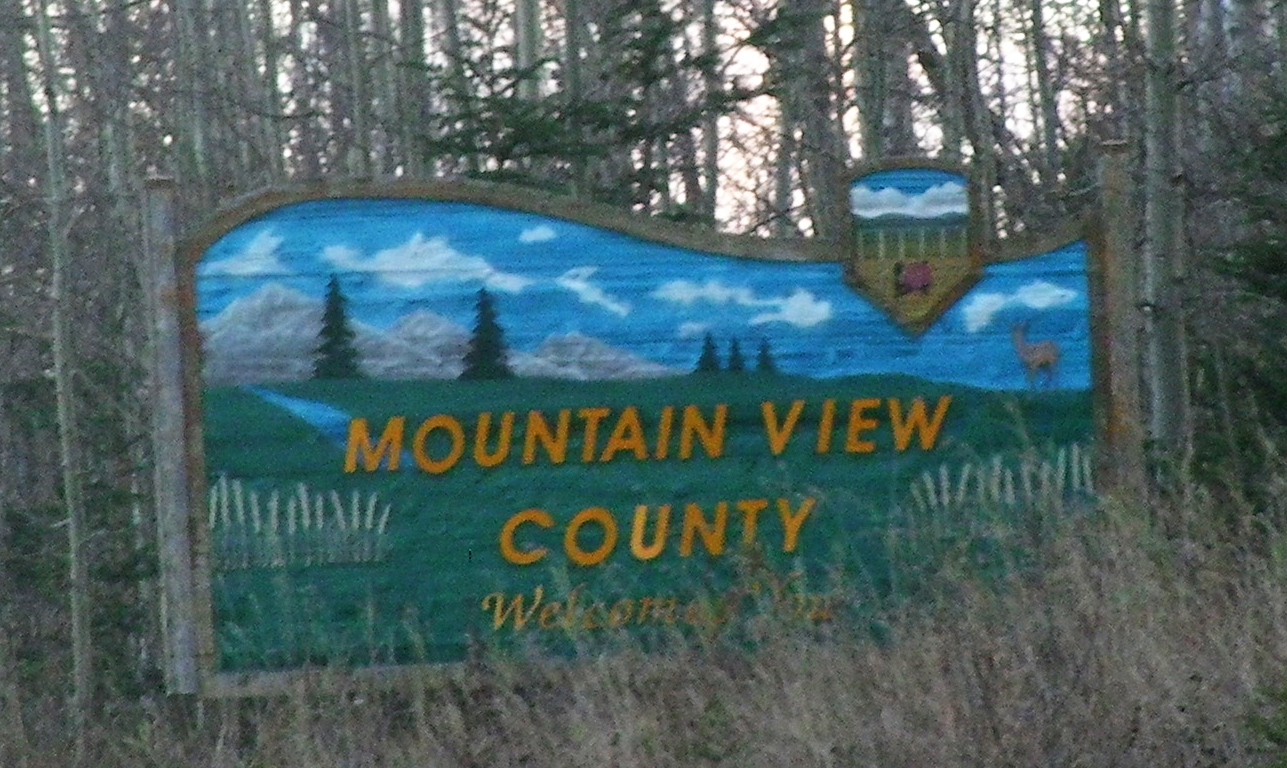
- Welcome sign

- Logo

- Location within Alberta
- Country: Canada
- Province: Alberta
- Region: Central Alberta
- Census division: 6
- Established: March 15, 1944 as M.D. of Mountain View No. 280
- Incorporated: January 1, 1961 as County of Mountain View No. 17
- Name changed: January 21, 1998 to Mountain View County

Government
  - Reeve: Angela Aalbers
  - CAO: Jeff Holmes
  - Administrative office: north of Didsbury

Area (2021)
  - Land: 3,763.42 km^{2} (1,453.06 sq mi)

Population (2021)
  - Total: 12,981
  - Density: 3.4/km^{2} (8.8/sq mi)
- Time zone: UTC−06:00 (Alberta Time)
- Website: mountainviewcounty.com

Mountain View County is a municipal district in Division No. 6 in central Alberta, Canada. Located between the cities of Calgary and Red Deer within the Calgary-Edmonton corridor, its municipal office is located north of the Town of Didsbury. Mountain View County is a member of the Rural Municipalities of Alberta, along with numerous local boards, commissions and committees.

== History ==
The first government surveys of the area between Calgary and Edmonton were not made until 1883, around the time when the Canadian Pacific Railway arrived from Eastern Canada in Calgary, then just a small settlement. Just to the east of where the busy Queen Elizabeth II highway runs today, people and goods travelled between Calgary and Fort Edmonton by wagon along the original Calgary and Edmonton Trail. In 1890, the Calgary and Edmonton Railway was chartered, and construction began, with the line reaching the area now comprising the county by the end of that year.

While a handful of squatters had arrived pre-1890, settlement in the area did not begin in earnest until the arrival of the C & E Railway. On July 27, 1891, the first through train made the trip from Calgary to Strathcona, marking the beginning of regular scheduled passenger train service for the next 60 years. The operation of Calgary & Edmonton Railway passed to the Canadian Pacific Railway, which continues to operate the line as its main Calgary-Edmonton connection.

After 1891, homesteaders began to arrive in the region from across Europe and North America, with settlements sprouting up around the fourth (Carstairs), fifth (Didsbury) and sixth (Olds) sidings.

Settlement in the early days was typified by ethnic and usually religious groups living in close-knit communities or colonies. Notable among them were a group of Mennonite families who homesteaded in the Didsbury area from Europe via Ontario around the turn of the 19th century. A large number of German settlers from the American Midwest also settled around Olds; and a group of Norwegian pioneers blazed a trail westward towards Sundre and Bergen.

As the population grew, so did their needs. This led to the formation of local government, though the creation of local Improvement Districts. These were relatively small administrative units, generally no bigger than 72 square miles (190 km^{2}) in size, and were responsible for a number of limited duties including setting local tax rates, and keeping track of necessary local improvements.

In December 1911 the Alberta government brought forward new legislation designed to introduce greater self-government into rural areas of the province. Specifically, the Municipal Act of 1912 encouraged local improvement districts to consolidate with one another to form larger rural municipalities.

Initially the response to the idea of consolidation was unenthusiastic. A majority of rural residents in Mountain View voted against consolidation with other L.I.D.'s in a series of plebiscites held in 1912. Only the Rural Municipality of Mountain View No. 310 would be created out of four improvement districts around Olds and Didsbury, making it one of 55 rural municipalities to come into existence province-wide on December 9, 1912. While Mountain View was the first to consolidate, others would soon follow their lead.

The Municipal District of Mountain View No. 49 was formed into the County of Mountain View No. 17 as of January 1, 1961, with William J. Bagnall of Dogpound was selected as the county's first reeve. A municipal councillor prior to the county's formation, Bagnall would continue to serve as reeve until 1980.

The newly formed county chose Didsbury as the location of its municipal office, and in October 1962, a new administration building was opened to house both the county administration and the school board. This building would serve the county until a new state-of-the-art office was built in 2005, near the Olds-Didsbury Airport along Highway 2A.

On January 21, 1998, the County of Mountain View No. 17 officially changed its name to Mountain View County, as it continues to be known today.

== Geography ==
=== Communities and localities ===
The following urban municipalities are surrounded by Mountain View County.

Cities

- none

Towns

- Carstairs
- Didsbury
- Olds
- Sundre

Villages

- Cremona

Summer villages

- none

The following hamlets are located within Mountain View County.

Hamlets

- none

The following localities are located within Mountain View County.

Localities

- Blooming Prairie
- Bearberry
- Bergen
- Dogpound
- Eagle Hill
- Elkton
- Garfield
- Harmattan
- Jackville
- Mayton
- Minaret
- Mound
- Neapolis
- Netook
- Shantz
- Stirlingville
- Water Valley
- Wessex
- Westcott
- Westerdale
- Westward Ho

=== Rural neighbourhoods ===
In 2008, Mountain View County established 20 districts as rural neighbourhoods.

- Bearberry / Coalcamp
- Bergen
- Dogpound
- Eagle Hill / Westward Ho
- Elkton / Rugby

- Fallentimber
- Hainstock
- Harmattan
- Jackson
- James River

- Lonepine
- McDougal Flats
- Midway
- Netook
- Reed Ranch

- Rosebud
- Water Valley / Winchell Lake
- Wessex
- Westcott
- Westerdale

== Demographics ==
In the 2021 Census of Population conducted by Statistics Canada, Mountain View County had a population of 12,981 living in 5,014 of its 5,743 total private dwellings, a change of −0.7% from its 2016 population of 13,074. With a land area of 3,763.42 km^{2} (1,453.06 sq mi), it had a population density of 3.4/km^{2} (8.9/sq mi) in 2021.

In the 2016 Census of Population conducted by Statistics Canada, Mountain View County had a population of 13,074 living in 5,025 of its 5,666 total private dwellings, a 5.8% change from its 2011 population of 12,359. With a land area of 3,782.64 km^{2} (1,460.49 sq mi), it had a population density of 3.5/km^{2} (9.0/sq mi) in 2016.

== Economy ==
Oil and gas is the main economic driver of Mountain View County, along with agriculture, forestry and tourism.

== Education ==
In the early 1890s the first schools began to organize in the area now comprising Mountain View County. By 1930, almost 90 school districts had been created to serve the region, with the one-room school house remaining a fixture of rural life until 1936, when the Social Credit government allowed for the creation of larger school divisions.

As consolidation of rural municipalities continued throughput the 1940s and 50s, the provincial government moved to amalgamate municipalities and the local school boards. In 1955, the M.D. of Mountain View and Olds School Division No. 39 were made "coterminous" (meaning they shared the same boundaries). With the introduction of the County system of government in 1961, joint administration of municipalities and the school boards was initiated, and would continue until 1994.

Olds School Division No. 39 would eventually evolve into the Chinook's Edge School Division, which continues to serve the county.

== See also ==
- List of communities in Alberta
- List of municipal districts in Alberta
