= Didsbury, Alberta =

Didsbury
- Town
- Town of Didsbury
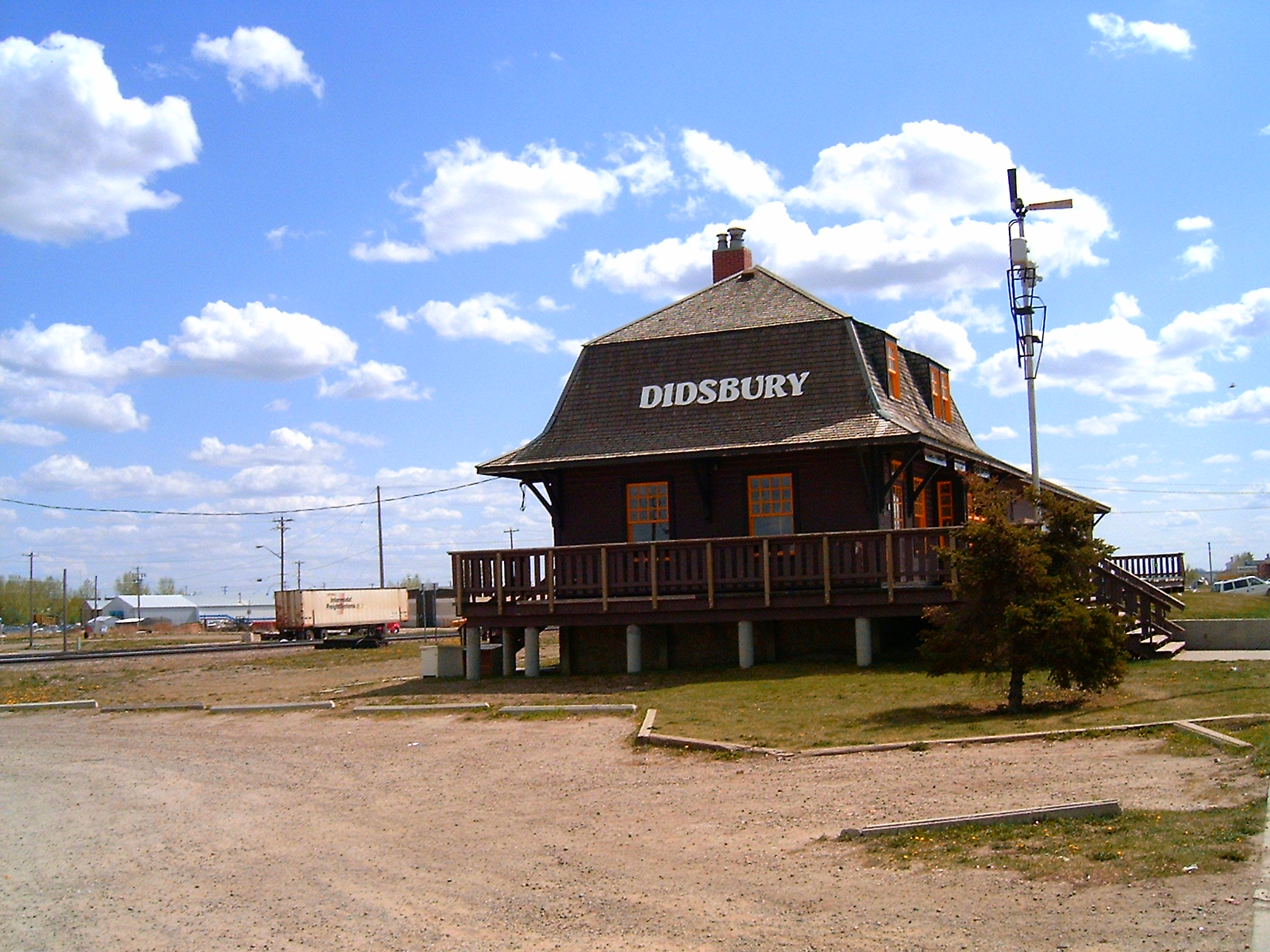
- Didsbury railway station

- Location of Didsbury in Alberta
- Coordinates: 51°39′57″N 114°07′52″W
- Country: Canada
- Province: Alberta
- Region: Central Alberta
- Census division: 6
- Municipal district: Mountain View County
- Incorporated
  - Village: December 24, 1901
  - Town: September 27, 1906

Government
  - Type: Municipality
  - Mayor: Chris Little
  - CAO: Ethan Gorner
  - Governing body: Didsbury Town Council
  - MP: Blaine Calkins
  - MLA: Nathan Cooper

Area (2021)
  - Land: 16.12 km^{2} (6.22 sq mi)
- Elevation: 1,037 m (3,402 ft)

Population (2021)
  - Total: 5,070
  - Density: 314.5/km^{2} (815/sq mi)
- Demonym: Didsburian
- Time zone: UTC−06:00 (Alberta Time)
- Postal code span: T0M
- Highways: Highway 2A; Highway 582
- Waterway: Rosebud River
- Website: Official website

Didsbury is a town in central Alberta, Canada at the foothills of the Rocky Mountains. It is located next to Alberta Highway 2A, near the Queen Elizabeth II Highway. Didsbury is within the Calgary-Edmonton corridor. Didsbury is approximately the half-way point between the cities of Calgary and Red Deer.

Didsbury is surrounded by Mountain View County, which has its municipal office located to the north of the town. The nearest neighbouring communities are the towns of Olds to the north and Carstairs to the south.

== History ==
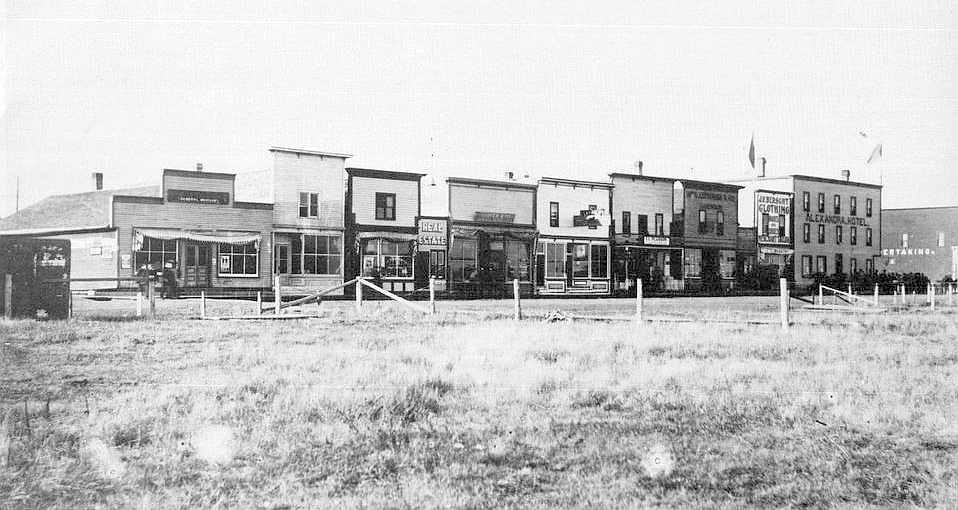
Didsbury, circa 1905

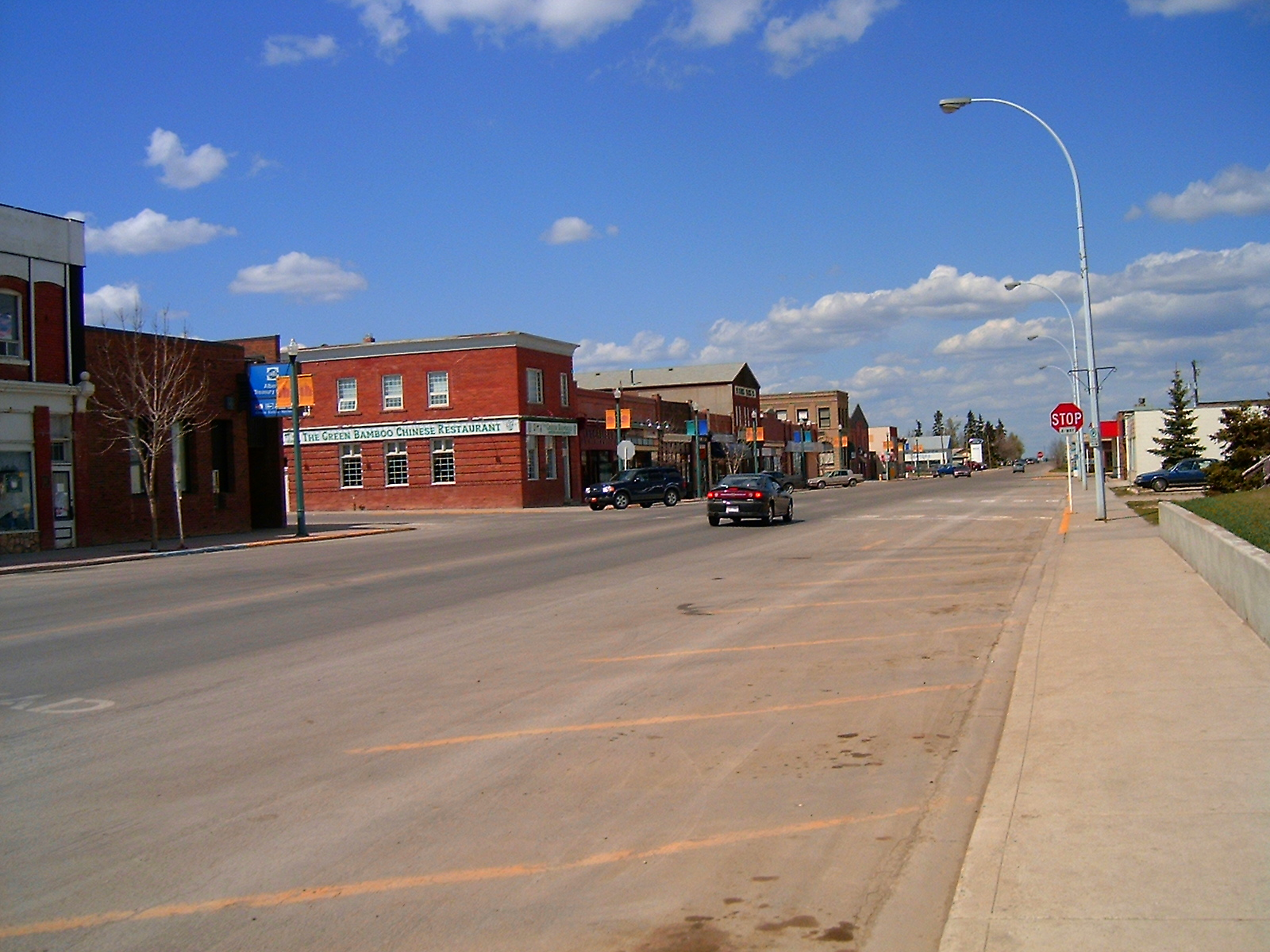
Main Street in Didsbury

The town is named after the township of Didsbury, which is now a suburban area of Manchester, England. The first settlers were German Mennonites who left their homes in Pennsylvania following the American Revolution and emigrated to Waterloo County in Ontario. They were granted the area around Didsbury in 1894 by the government of Sir John A. Macdonald.

Original settlement in the area was sparse, and this in part explains the initial slow development of the town-site as a service centre. The first concern of the Mennonite settlers was to build a church; and the primary task of the settlers was to create farmsteads. Settlement prior to the post-1900 land rush was limited to the small group who came west in 1894.

1891 saw the arrival of the Calgary and Edmonton Railway (C&ER), which pushed forward the town's development. The Canadian Pacific Railway, which had absorbed the C&ER, constructed a station in the town in 1904. Didsbury was incorporated as a village in 1905 and as a town on September 6, 1906.

Fires in 1914 and 1924 destroyed the early "boomtown" commercial streetscape and led to the passing by Town Council of a bylaw which required masonry construction for all new downtown commercial buildings. Many of these brick buildings stand as of 2005.

On July 1, 2023, a large EF4 tornado caused severe damage just south of the town.

== Demographics ==
In the 2021 Census of Population conducted by Statistics Canada, the Town of Didsbury had a population of 5,070 living in 2,047 of its 2,157 total private dwellings, a change of −3.8% from its 2016 population of 5,268. With a land area of 16.12 km^{2} (6.22 sq mi), it had a population density of 314.5/km^{2} (814.6/sq mi) in 2021.

In the 2016 Census of Population conducted by Statistics Canada, the Town of Didsbury recorded a population of 5,268 living in 2,031 of its 2,119 total private dwellings, a 6.3% change from its 2011 population of 4,957. With a land area of 16.37 km^{2} (6.32 sq mi), it had a population density of 321.8/km^{2} (833.5/sq mi) in 2016.

== Infrastructure ==
The town's recreational facilities include six parks, a golf course, aquatic centre, and a hockey rink. There is also a hospital and a Royal Canadian Mounted Police detachment serving the town and the surrounding area.

Didsbury has three schools that are under the jurisdiction of the Chinook's Edge School Division.

The Olds-Didsbury Airport, which is used primarily for small aircraft and general aviation, is located north of Didsbury along Highway 2A.

== Media ==
The town is served by the Didsbury Review, which is part of the Great West Newspapers chain.

== Sport and recreation ==
Didsbury is home to the Mountainview Colts of the Heritage Junior B Hockey League.

== Organizations ==
Organizations present in Didsbury include the Royal Canadian Army Cadets and the 1st Didsbury Scouts, Didsbury Jazzercise, as well as the Elks and Lions clubs.

== See also ==
- List of communities in Alberta
- List of towns in Alberta
