= Olds, Alberta =

Olds
- Town
- Town of Olds
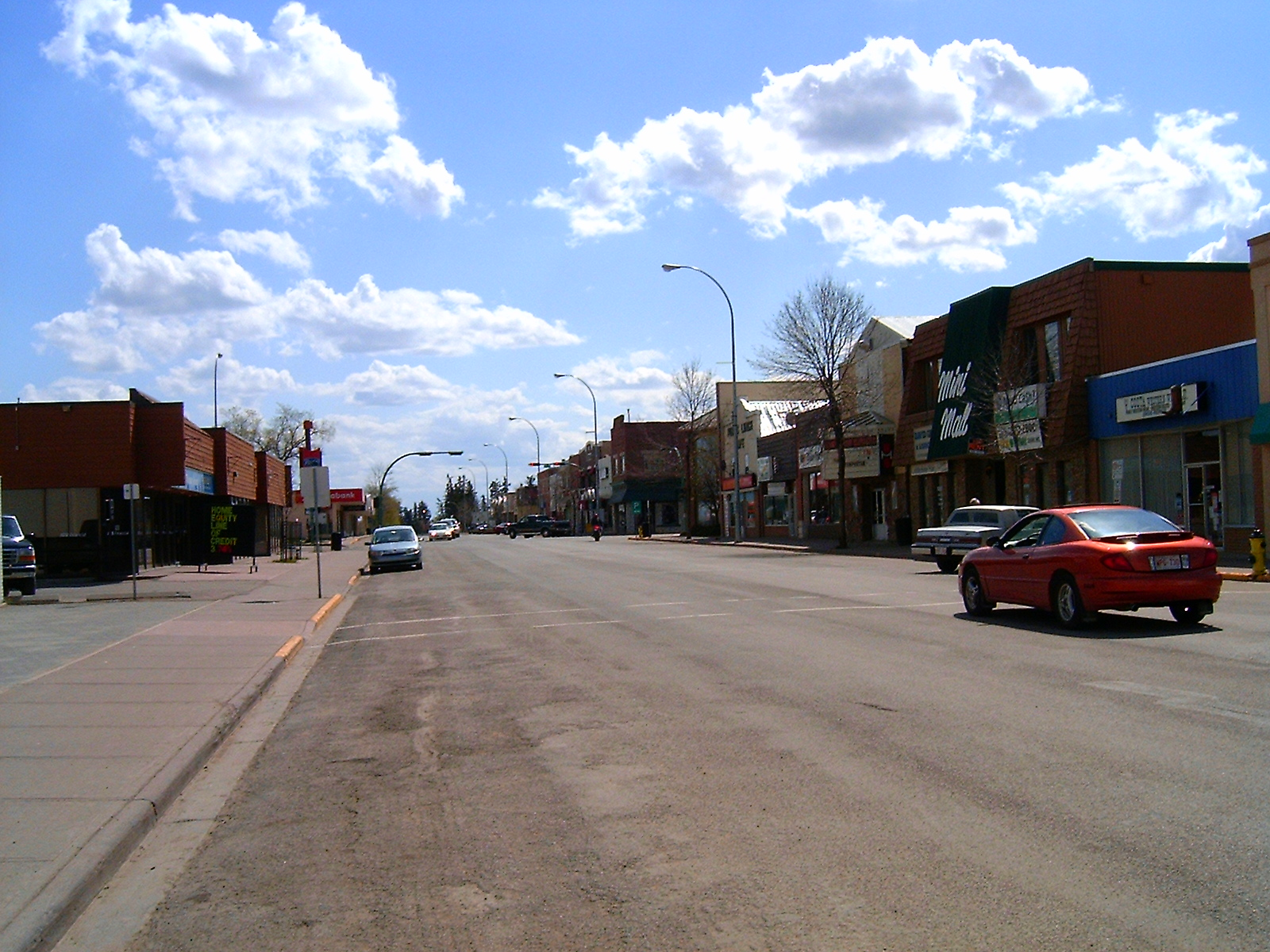
- Main Street Olds

- Location of Olds Olds (Canada)
- Coordinates: 51°47′34″N 114°06′24″W
- Country: Canada
- Province: Alberta
- Region: Central Alberta
- Census division: 6
- Municipal district: Mountain View County
- Incorporated
  - Village: 26 May 1896
  - Town: 1 July 1905

Government
  - Mayor: Daniel Daley
  - Governing body: Olds Town Council
  - MP: Blaine Calkins (Ponoka—Didsbury-Cons)
  - MLA: Tara Sawyer (Olds-Didsbury-Three Hills-UCP)

Area (2021)
  - Land: 14.92 km^{2} (5.76 sq mi)
- Elevation: 1,041 m (3,415 ft)

Population (2021)
  - Total: 9,209
  - Density: 617.3/km^{2} (1,599/sq mi)
- Time zone: UTC−06:00 (Alberta Time)
- Forward sortation area: T4H
- Area codes: -1+403, -1+587
- Highways: Highway 2A; Highway 27
- Website: Official website

Olds (/oʊldz/ OHLDZ) is a town in central Alberta, Canada within Mountain View County and the Calgary–Edmonton Corridor. It is approximately 61 km (38 mi) south of Red Deer and 90 km (56 mi) north of Calgary. The nearest towns are Didsbury to the south, Bowden to the north, Sundre to the west and Three Hills to the east. Olds is located at the intersection of Highway 27 and Highway 2A, 5 km (3.1 mi) west of the Queen Elizabeth II Highway. The Canadian Pacific Kansas City's main Edmonton-Calgary line runs through the town.

== Geography ==
Olds lies within the Grasslands Natural Region of Alberta. The community is about 1,041 m (3,415 ft) above sea level.

=== Climate ===
Olds has a humid continental climate (Köppen climate classification Dfb) and falls into the Natural Resources Canada (NRC) Plant Hardiness Zone 3b. The average temperature is around 11.5 °C (52.7 °F) in late July to −10.1 °C (13.8 °F) in mid-January.

Winters are cold with temperatures often dropping to or below −30 °C (−22 °F). These are broken up from the dry chinook winds from the mountains.

Summers can be hot with temperatures reaching up to 30 °C (86 °F).

Climate data for Olds
Month	Jan	Feb	Mar	Apr	May	Jun	Jul	Aug	Sep	Oct	Nov	Dec	Year
Record high °C (°F)	17.2 (63.0)	18.3 (64.9)	22.8 (73.0)	29.4 (84.9)	35.6 (96.1)	36.1 (97.0)	37.2 (99.0)	33.9 (93.0)	33.9 (93.0)	30.6 (87.1)	23.3 (73.9)	19.0 (66.2)	37.2 (99.0)
Mean daily maximum °C (°F)	−3.0 (26.6)	−1.2 (29.8)	2.3 (36.1)	10.2 (50.4)	15.9 (60.6)	19.3 (66.7)	21.8 (71.2)	21.9 (71.4)	16.8 (62.2)	10.8 (51.4)	1.6 (34.9)	−1.9 (28.6)	9.6 (49.3)
Daily mean °C (°F)	−8.7 (16.3)	−6.9 (19.6)	−3.1 (26.4)	3.9 (39.0)	9.4 (48.9)	13.3 (55.9)	15.6 (60.1)	15.2 (59.4)	10.1 (50.2)	4.5 (40.1)	−3.7 (25.3)	−7.4 (18.7)	3.5 (38.3)
Mean daily minimum °C (°F)	−14.3 (6.3)	−12.6 (9.3)	−8.6 (16.5)	−2.4 (27.7)	2.9 (37.2)	7.3 (45.1)	9.4 (48.9)	8.4 (47.1)	3.5 (38.3)	−2.0 (28.4)	−8.9 (16.0)	−12.8 (9.0)	−2.5 (27.5)
Record low °C (°F)	−43.3 (−45.9)	−43.9 (−47.0)	−37.2 (−35.0)	−29.4 (−20.9)	−15.6 (3.9)	−2.8 (27.0)	−2.2 (28.0)	−4.0 (24.8)	−15.0 (5.0)	−26.0 (−14.8)	−34.0 (−29.2)	−43.3 (−45.9)	−43.9 (−47.0)
Average precipitation mm (inches)	17.7 (0.70)	14.4 (0.57)	23.0 (0.91)	23.7 (0.93)	56.6 (2.23)	89.8 (3.54)	66.0 (2.60)	64.6 (2.54)	58.3 (2.30)	18.6 (0.73)	16.6 (0.65)	13.3 (0.52)	492.4 (19.39)
Average rainfall mm (inches)	0.1 (0.00)	0.1 (0.00)	1.9 (0.07)	12.5 (0.49)	47.6 (1.87)	94.2 (3.71)	89.8 (3.54)	65.8 (2.59)	54.0 (2.13)	9.7 (0.38)	0.9 (0.04)	0.2 (0.01)	376.7 (14.83)
Average snowfall cm (inches)	17.6 (6.9)	14.3 (5.6)	21.1 (8.3)	11.3 (4.4)	9.1 (3.6)	0.0 (0.0)	0.0 (0.0)	0.3 (0.1)	4.4 (1.7)	8.9 (3.5)	15.7 (6.2)	13.1 (5.2)	115.7 (45.6)
Average precipitation days (≥ 0.2 mm)	0.08	0.12	0.42	4.2	11.2	15.2	14.2	12.4	9.7	4.2	0.35	0.19	72.1
Average rainy days (≥ 0.2 mm)	7.6	6.1	7.2	3.6	1.4	0.0	0.0	0.12	0.78	3.0	6.0	5.6	41.4
Average snowy days (≥ 0.2 cm)	7.7	6.2	7.6	7.4	12.1	15.2	14.2	12.4	10.1	6.9	6.4	5.8	111.9
Mean monthly sunshine hours	87.4	107.2	147.1	187.5	215.8	237.1	271.7	249.7	180.8	145.3	88.9	80.0	1,998.4
Percentage possible sunshine	33.7	38.3	40.1	45.1	44.5	47.6	54.2	55.1	47.5	43.8	33.3	32.7	43.0
Source: Environment Canada

=== Flora and fauna ===
Olds has various species living in and around it including poplar trees and various wild grasses. Olds is an agriculture based town, so a large portion of the flora grown are crops of canola (Brassica juncea subsp. juncea) and barley (Hordeum vulgare).

The majority of fauna consists of livestock like cattle, and poultry. Many surrounding farms keep horses and/or donkeys.

=== Residential areas and neighbourhoods ===
The town of Olds is surrounded by residential neighbourhoods with various styles of housing. There are several mobile home parks throughout the town. There are also many neighbourhoods such as the Vistas and Deer Meadows.

== Economy ==
Olds had its own fibre optic Internet service provider called O-Net that provided gigabit speeds to its residents and businesses. The service cost the town about $21,000,000 to install and was sold to Telus Communications Inc. on Nov. 6 2024 for $11,000,000 leaving the town with an estimated debt of $3,000,000 that the municipality says it plans to make “lump sum payments with the proceeds we have left over and service the remaining debt until what we expect to be the loan maturation date of 2031.”.

Olds has a big-box retail centre which opened in 2008. It features a Walmart, Canadian Tire, Home Hardware, Sobeys' and other major retailers.

== Demographics ==
Historical population
Year	Pop.	±%
1936	1,196	—
1941	1,316	+10.0%
1946	1,521	+15.6%
1951	1,617	+6.3%
1971	3,459	+113.9%
1976	3,805	+10.0%
1986	5,005	+31.5%
1991	5,542	+10.7%
1996	5,815	+4.9%
2001	6,607	+13.6%
2006	7,248	+9.7%
2011	8,235	+13.6%
2016	9,184	+11.5%

In the 2021 Census of Population conducted by Statistics Canada, the Town of Olds had a population of 9,209 living in 3,810 of its 4,096 total private dwellings, a change of 0.3% from its 2016 population of 9,184. With a land area of 14.92 km^{2} (5.76 sq mi), it had a population density of 617.2/km^{2} (1,598.6/sq mi) in 2021.

In the 2016 Census of Population conducted by Statistics Canada, the Town of Olds recorded a population of 9,184 living in 3,698 of its 3,942 total private dwellings, a change of 11.5% from its 2011 population of 8,235. With a land area of 14.93 km^{2} (5.76 sq mi), it had a population density of 615.1/km^{2} (1,593.2/sq mi) in 2016.

The population of the Town of Olds according to its 2014 municipal census is 8,617, a change of 1.2% from its 2013 municipal census population of 8,511.

Panethnic groups in the Town of Olds (2001−2021)
Panethnic group	2021		2016		2011		2006		2001	
Panethnic group	Pop.	%	Pop.	%	Pop.	%	Pop.	%	Pop.	%
European (Note: Statistic includes all persons that did not make up part of a visible minority or an indigenous identity.)	7,595	85.15%	7,850	89%	7,315	90.93%	6,780	95.29%	6,210	96.2%
Indigenous	510	5.72%	315	3.57%	350	4.35%	160	2.25%	135	2.09%
Southeast Asian (Note: Statistic includes total responses of "Filipino" and "Southeast Asian" under visible minority section on census.)	430	4.82%	315	3.57%	115	1.43%	10	0.14%	40	0.62%
South Asian	215	2.41%	105	1.19%	100	1.24%	75	1.05%	25	0.39%
African	65	0.73%	65	0.74%	0	0%	0	0%	25	0.39%
East Asian (Note: Statistic includes total responses of "Chinese", "Korean", and "Japanese" under visible minority section on census.)	35	0.39%	80	0.91%	0	0%	50	0.7%	25	0.39%
Latin American	25	0.28%	0	0%	0	0%	0	0%	20	0.31%
Middle Eastern (Note: Statistic includes total responses of "West Asian" and "Arab" under visible minority section on census.)	0	0%	85	0.96%	0	0%	25	0.35%	0	0%
Other/multiracial (Note: Statistic includes total responses of "Visible minority, n.i.e." and "Multiple visible minorities" under visible minority section on census.)	35	0.39%	20	0.23%	95	1.18%	0	0%	10	0.15%
Total responses	8,920	96.86%	8,820	96.04%	8,045	97.69%	7,115	98.17%	6,455	97.7%
Total population	9,209	100%	9,184	100%	8,235	100%	7,248	100%	6,607	100%
Note: Totals greater than 100% due to multiple origin responses

== Education ==
Olds has seven schools: École Olds Elementary School, École Deer Meadow School, Olds High School, Olds Koinonia Christian School, Holy Trinity Catholic School, Horizon School and Reed Ranch School. Five schools in the area are part of the Chinook's Edge School Division No. 73

École Olds Elementary School is an elementary school containing kindergarten to grade 4. The school contains a small gymnasium with a rock climbing wall. The gym previously doubled as the gymnastics centre for the gymnastics club, which is now located along 25th Ave.

École Deer Meadow School is a junior high school containing grades 5–8. There is a slightly larger gym as well as a music room for the students beginning in the band programs.

Olds High School is a junior/senior high school containing grades 9–12. The school has a gymnasium and fitness centre and a fine arts theatre and is part of the Olds College Campus. The school has a variety of educational programs such as sports, band, shop, drama and stained glass program.

Olds Koinonia Christian School is an elementary/high school containing grades K-12. It is not located inside the township boundaries, but is southeast on Range Rd 13. It has a large and small gymnasium.

Olds is also home to Olds College of Agriculture & Technology, noted for its agriculture technology programs.

== Sport and recreation ==
Olds is home to many sports teams such as the Olds Grizzlys Alberta Junior Hockey League (AJHL), located at the Olds Sports Complex. Olds College Broncos part of the Alberta Colleges Athletics Conference, Olds Rapids Swim Club located at the Olds Aquatic Centre. And many sporting events such as the Hay City Slam Skate Comp held every summer at the Olds Skate Park.

Home to two golf courses: Olds Central Highlands 23 hole course, 4.1 mi (6.6 km) east of Olds, off Highway 27 as well as the brand new 9 Hole Trail Creek Golf course located 7 km (4.3 mi) west of Olds, off Highway 27 that opened in July 2015

The Olds Gymnastics Club has recently migrated from their previous home in the Elementary School to a new building located along 25th Avenue. The building was formerly a Sears Canada building.

Olds houses the 185 Olds Royal Canadian Air Cadets Squadron. The building was formerly the Olds recreation centre and is now rendered to the squadron. The building is also rented out by many local dance and church programs.

== Notable people ==
- Danielle Lappage, Olympic wrestler, competed in Rio 2016
- Blake Richards, Canadian politician Member of Parliament for Banff-Airdrie (2008- current)
- Jay Rosehill, professional ice hockey player

== See also ==
- List of communities in Alberta
- List of towns in Alberta
