= Carstairs, Alberta =

Carstairs
- Town
- Town of Carstairs
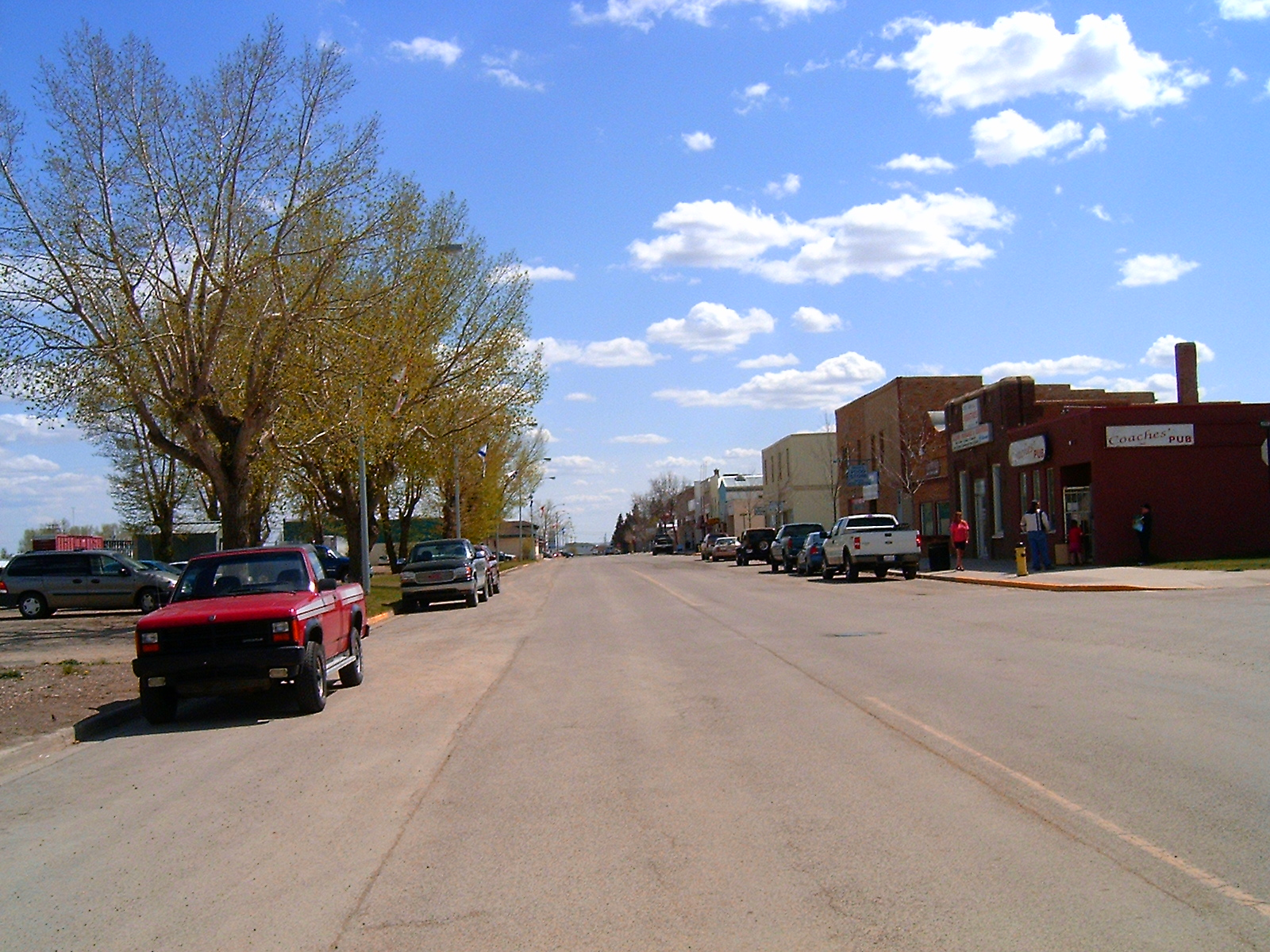
- Main Street in Carstairs

- Flag Coat of arms

- Location of Carstairs in Alberta Carstairs (Canada)
- Coordinates: 51°33′43″N 114°05′43″W
- Country: Canada
- Province: Alberta
- Region: Central Alberta
- Census division: 6
- Municipal district: Mountain View County
- Incorporated
  - Village: May 15, 1903
  - Town: September 1, 1966

Government
  - Mayor: Dean Allan
  - Governing body: Carstairs Town Council
  - CAO: Rick Blair
  - MP: William Stevenson, Yellowhead
  - MLA Tara Sawyer: Nathan Cooper

Area (2021)
  - Land: 11.77 km^{2} (4.54 sq mi)
- Elevation: 1,060 m (3,480 ft)

Population (2021)
  - Total: 4,898
  - Density: 416.2/km^{2} (1,078/sq mi)
- Time zone: UTC−06:00 (Alberta Time)
- Postal code: T0M 0N0
- Area code: +1-403
- Highways: Highway 2A
- Website: Official website

Carstairs is a town in central Alberta, Canada. It is located on Highway 2A, 48 kilometres (30 mi) north of Calgary, the nearest major city, and 241 kilometres (150 mi) south of the provincial capital, Edmonton. The closest neighbouring communities are the towns of Didsbury and Crossfield. Carstairs is located entirely within the rural Mountain View County.

Named after Carstairs, Scotland, Carstairs began life as a loading platform on the railway connecting Calgary to Edmonton. The first post office opened in 1900. The first school district was established in 1901.

== History ==
The origins of the Town of Carstairs dates back centuries to a network of trails collectively known as the Ancient Trail (also referred to as The Old North Trail and the Wolf Track). This important transportation corridor passed through the Carstairs area. Several prominent rock formations along river and creek beds were found in the district, and these were known resting and stopping sites for First Nations people as they moved up-and-down this corridor.

As the fur trade developed and settlement grew, the newcomers to the region adopted the same network of trails that had been used for centuries. In 1883, one of those newcomers, Sam Scarlett, set up a Stopping House at one of the prominent rock formations along the Rosebud River. "Scarlett's" became an important and popular stop along the Calgary and Edmonton Trail - frequented by freighters, the NWMP, military and the various stage coach lines.

When the Calgary and Edmonton Railway arrived in 1890, the surveyors made an allotment for a siding, station house, and townsite to be built in relative proximity to Scarlett's Stopping House. However, to avoid crossing the Rosebud River at that point, the rail line was laid approximately 4 km west of Scarlett's.

Named 'Carstairs' the new townsite's development started off slowly, but by the turn of the 20th century, the area began a steady growth pattern that allowed it to be officially recognized as Carstairs, NWT on May 15, 1903. The name changed to Carstairs, Alta in 1905 when Alberta received official Provincial status.

On July 1, 2023, a large EF4 tornado caused severe damage just north of the town.

== Demographics ==
In the 2021 Census of Population conducted by Statistics Canada, the Town of Carstairs had a population of 4,898 living in 1,837 of its 1,883 total private dwellings, a change of 20.1% from its 2016 population of 4,077. With a land area of 11.77 km^{2} (4.54 sq mi), it had a population density of 416.1/km^{2} (1,077.8/sq mi) in 2021.

In the 2016 Census of Population conducted by Statistics Canada, the Town of Carstairs recorded a population of 4,077 living in 1,544 of its 1,590 total private dwellings, a change of 18.4% from its 2011 population of 3,442. With a land area of 11.92 km^{2} (4.60 sq mi), it had a population density of 342.0/km^{2} (885.9/sq mi) in 2016.

== Transportation ==
First Student Canada provides commuter bus service to Calgary from Didsbury and Carstairs. The service loads commuters at the Carstairs Curling Club.

== Amenities ==
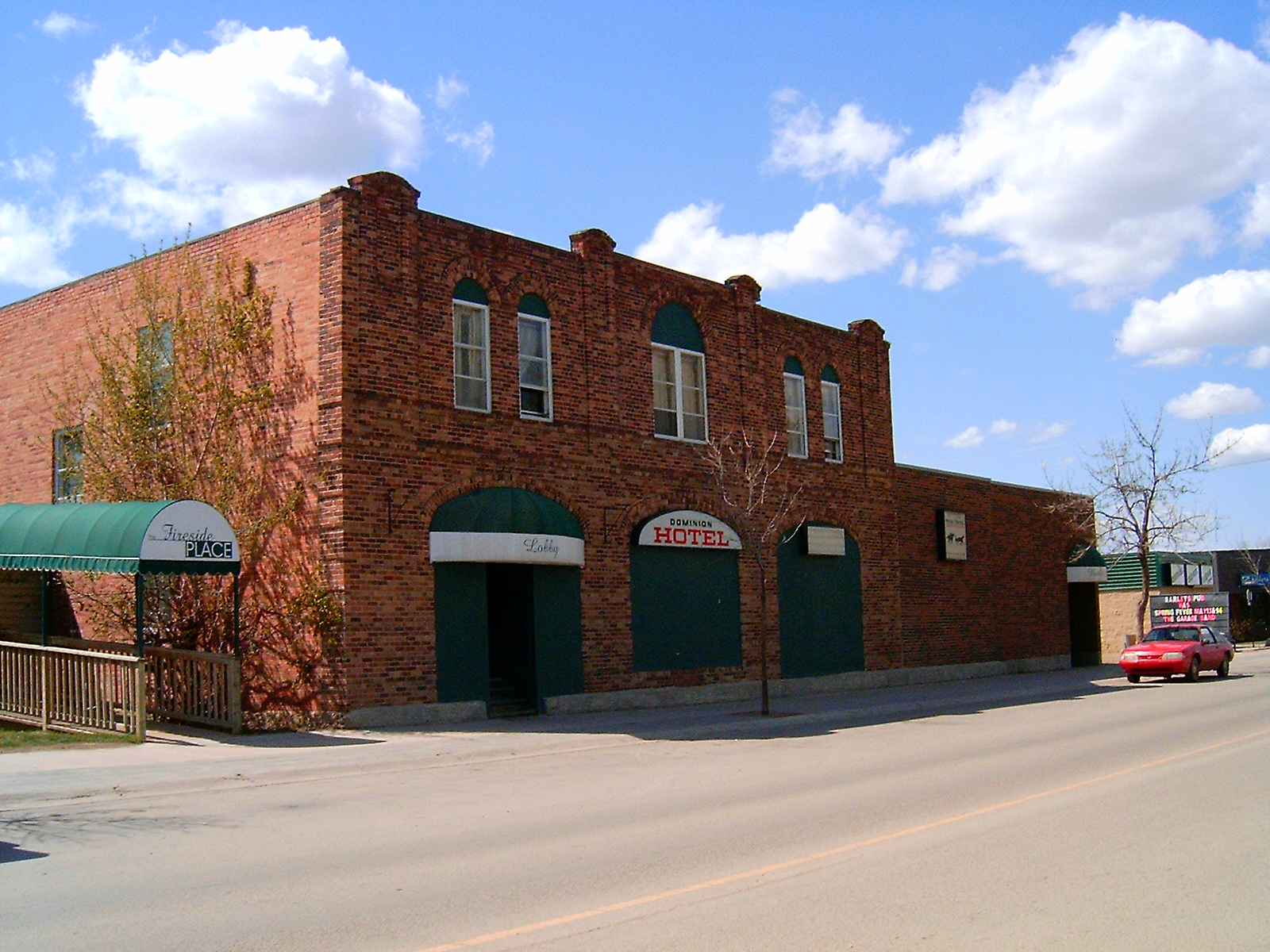
Old Dominion Hotel

Carstairs is home to an 18-hole golf course, a Memorial Complex with abundant parks and playgrounds, and Tourist Information Center. Carstairs has historically been an agricultural community, as it once had seven grain elevators. It celebrates each year with the CARA Rodeo in July, Beef & Barley Days, the High School Rodeo in September, 4-H Calf Show and Sale, Bull-A-Rama, Horticultural Show, and Pumpkin Festival.

There are seven churches in the town, including the Carstairs Church of God, St. Agnes Catholic Church, and the Carstairs Bancroft United Church. One of the churches is being used as a museum that often has religious services.

== Notable people ==
- Tony Stiles former professional hockey player and member of Canadian Olympic Hockey team

== See also ==
- List of communities in Alberta
- List of towns in Alberta
