= Sundre =

Town in Alberta, Canada

- Town
- Town of Sundre
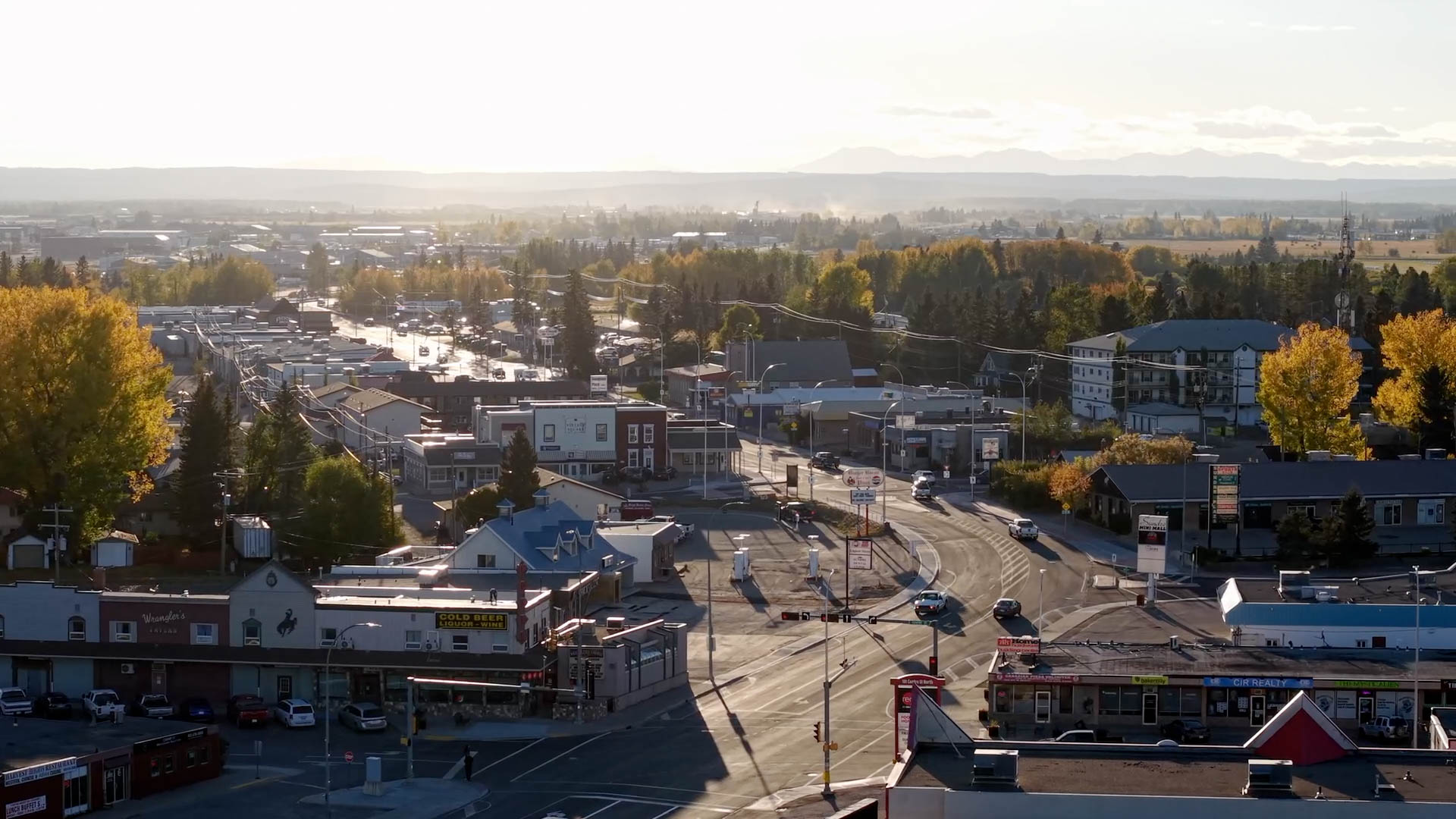
- Main Street in Sundre

- Logo

- Location of Sundre in Alberta
- Coordinates: 51°47′50″N 114°38′26″W
- Country: Canada
- Province: Alberta
- Region: Central Alberta
- Census division: 6
- Municipal district: Mountain View County
- Incorporated
  - Village: December 31, 1949
  - Town: January 1, 1956

Government
  - Mayor: Richard Warnock
  - Governing body: Sundre Town Council
  - MP: William Stevenson (Canadian politician) (Conservative)
  - MLA: (Jason Nixon) (United Conservative Party)

Area (2021)
  - Land: 10.84 km^{2} (4.19 sq mi)
- Elevation: 1,093 m (3,586 ft)

Population (2021)
  - Total: 2,672
  - Density: 246.4/km^{2} (638/sq mi)
- Time zone: UTC−06:00 (Alberta Time)
- Postal code: T0M 1X0
- Area codes: +1-403, +1-587
- Highways: Cowboy Trail; Highway 27
- Waterway: Red Deer River
- Website: Official website

Sundre /ˈsʌndri/ is a town in central Alberta, Canada, that is surrounded by Mountain View County. It is approximately 100 kilometres (62 mi) northwest of Calgary on the Cowboy Trail in the foothills of the Canadian Rockies.

Sundre takes its name from a town in Norway, the original home of Nels T. Hagen, the town's first postmaster.

Although considered a forestry town, the community is also home to a significant number of oil and gas service businesses. Due to its attractive geographic location, with proximity to vast natural landscapes, camping and recreation-oriented tourism is also a major economic driver.

Biking, hiking, cross country skiing, and other outdoor activities are popular. The community features over 50 kilometres of trails and pathways, including paved pathways, trails and single-track trails. The Sundre Bike n Ski Club maintains the trail network in partnership with the Town of Sundre.

The community is home to one hospital, the Myron Thompson Health Centre. There are two medical clinics, including Greenwood Family Physicians, and the Moose & Squirrel Medical Clinic. The Sundre Hospital Futures Committee actively recruits medical professionals to the community. As of June 18, 2025, at least 10 doctors practice medicine within the community.

There are three private daycares, one public elementary school and one public high school within the Town of Sundre. River Valley Elementary School and Sundre High School are part of the Chinook's Edge School Division.

== History ==
Sundre's first postmaster, Nels T. Hagen, arrived in 1906. Sundre incorporated as a village in 1950 and then as a town in 1956.

== Demographics ==
In the 2021 Census of Population conducted by Statistics Canada, the Town of Sundre had a population of 2,672 living in 1,187 of its 1,270 total private dwellings, a change of −2.1% from its 2016 population of 2,729. With a land area of 10.84 km^{2} (4.19 sq mi), it had a population density of 246.5/km^{2} (638.4/sq mi) in 2021.

In the 2016 Census of Population conducted by Statistics Canada, the Town of Sundre recorded a population of 2,729 living in 1,188 of its 1,256 total private dwellings, a 4.6% change from its 2011 population of 2,610. With a land area of 11.11 km^{2} (4.29 sq mi), it had a population density of 245.6/km^{2} (636.2/sq mi) in 2016.

The Town of Sundre's 2012 municipal census counted a population of 2,695.

== Economy ==
Main industries in the area are petroleum production, forestry, agriculture, and ranching. The combined service, hospitality and tourism sector constitutes a major employment base within the community, as well. With two public schools, a public hospital, a Royal Canadian Mounted Police detachment, three municipalities in close proximity (Town of Sundre, Mountain View County, and Clearwater County), the public sector also represents a substantial employment area.

Supporting Sundre's relatively significant tourism sector, there are at least half a dozen notable annual events. Winterfest happens annually during Family Day weekend in February; the Sundre Pro Rodeo, one of the highest paying pro rodeos in Canada, happens the second last weekend of June; the Shady Grove Bluegrass Festival is held in mid-July; Sundre Broncs, Bulls and Wagons Rodeo occurs usually during the latter half of August; and Sundown in Sundre, an annual merchants event organized by the Sundre & District Chamber of Commerce, is hosted either during the final Friday of November or the first Friday of December.

== Climate ==
Sundre has one of the highest average diurnal temperature variations in Canada, and especially in the winter months.

Climate data for Sundre Airport
Month	Jan	Feb	Mar	Apr	May	Jun	Jul	Aug	Sep	Oct	Nov	Dec	Year
Record high humidex	15.3	16.0	22.8	25.6	29.6	32.5	35.8	36.6	34.4	28.5	23.3	18.4	36.6
Record high °C (°F)	16.0 (60.8)	17.2 (63.0)	23.3 (73.9)	25.8 (78.4)	30.7 (87.3)	31.9 (89.4)	35.6 (96.1)	34.6 (94.3)	34.5 (94.1)	28.5 (83.3)	23.4 (74.1)	18.6 (65.5)	35.6 (96.1)
Mean daily maximum °C (°F)	−1.5 (29.3)	0.5 (32.9)	3.5 (38.3)	9.7 (49.5)	15.6 (60.1)	19.3 (66.7)	22.8 (73.0)	22.0 (71.6)	17.4 (63.3)	10.9 (51.6)	3.4 (38.1)	−1.4 (29.5)	10.2 (50.4)
Daily mean °C (°F)	−9.8 (14.4)	−8.3 (17.1)	−4.1 (24.6)	2.5 (36.5)	8.0 (46.4)	12.1 (53.8)	15.3 (59.5)	14.1 (57.4)	9.4 (48.9)	3.2 (37.8)	−4.1 (24.6)	−9.3 (15.3)	2.4 (36.3)
Mean daily minimum °C (°F)	−18.0 (−0.4)	−17.1 (1.2)	−11.7 (10.9)	−4.7 (23.5)	0.3 (32.5)	4.9 (40.8)	7.7 (45.9)	6.2 (43.2)	1.4 (34.5)	−4.5 (23.9)	−11.5 (11.3)	−17.2 (1.0)	−5.4 (22.3)
Record low °C (°F)	−47.7 (−53.9)	−39.7 (−39.5)	−40.9 (−41.6)	−23.9 (−11.0)	−9.7 (14.5)	−5.5 (22.1)	−1.5 (29.3)	−2.2 (28.0)	−9.2 (15.4)	−27.7 (−17.9)	−39.6 (−39.3)	−45.9 (−50.6)	−47.7 (−53.9)
Record low wind chill	−51	−55.7	−45.4	−27.8	−14.7	−5.9	0.0	−2.9	−11.1	−34.7	−44.1	−50.9	−55.7
Average precipitation mm (inches)	12.6 (0.50)	13.2 (0.52)	20.6 (0.81)	29.6 (1.17)	62.6 (2.46)	103.5 (4.07)	84.7 (3.33)	70.6 (2.78)	46.7 (1.84)	20.0 (0.79)	15.7 (0.62)	16.2 (0.64)	495.9 (19.52)
Average relative humidity (%)	56	50.4	48.3	43.6	42.8	48.8	48.6	46.6	46.0	45.5	53.9	56.9	49.0
Source: Environment Canada

== Arts and culture ==
Cultural venues within Sundre include the Sundre Municipal Library and the Sundre & District Pioneer Village Museum, which features "Chester Mjolsness' World of Wildlife" natural history exhibit of 150 taxidermy animals from across the world. The Sundre Arts Development Centre is also a prominent cultural venue located with Sundre; the building is operated by the non-profit Sundre Allied Arts Society, as a venue to host live music, theatre productions, dance, and other performing arts.

== Healthcare ==
Sundre is home to the Myron Thompson Health Centre, which offers a wide variety of services including emergency, acute care, palliative care, addiction and mental health treatment and laboratory services. The Sundre Hospital Steering Committee, composed of the Town of Sundre, Mountain View County, local physicians and the Sundre Hospital Futures Committee, is pursuing the replacement of the Myron Thompson Health Centre with a central Alberta rural health campus that will meet the needs of Sundre and surrounding communities.

== Notable people ==
- Myron Thompson, politician

== See also ==
- List of communities in Alberta
- List of towns in Alberta
