= Alberta Highway 22 =

Highway in Alberta, Canada

Highway 22
- Cowboy Trail
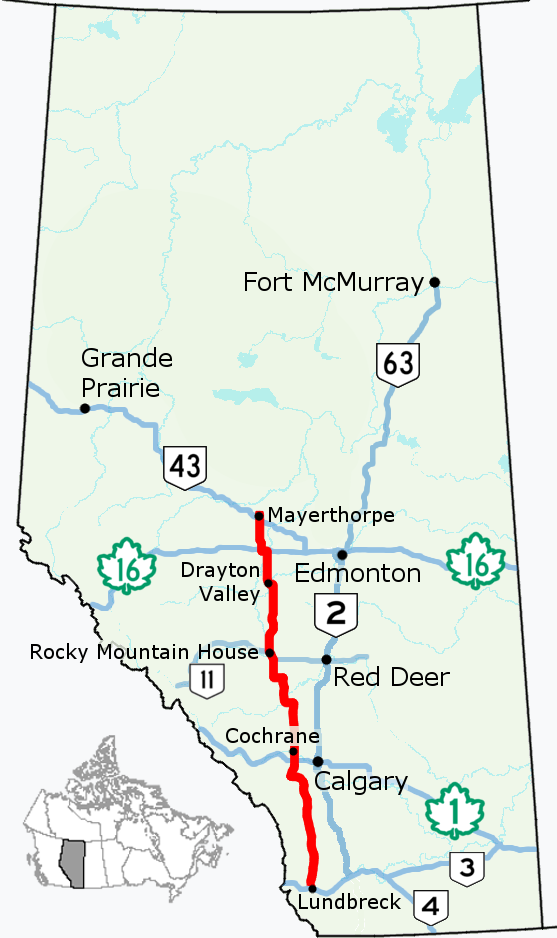
- Highway 22 highlighted in red

Route information
- Maintained by the Ministry of Transportation and Economic Corridors
- Length: 574 km (357 mi)

Major junctions
- South end: Highway 3 near Lundbreck
- Highway 7 in Diamond Valley; Highway 22X near Priddis; Highway 8 near Redwood Meadows; Highway 1 (TCH) near Cochrane; Highway 11 in Rocky Mountain House; Highway 12 near Rocky Mountain House; Highway 13 near Alder Flats; Highway 39 near Drayton Valley; Highway 16 (TCH) near Evansburg; Highway 43 in Mayerthorpe
- North end: Highway 18 near Mayerthorpe

Location
- Country: Canada
- Province: Alberta
- Specialized and rural municipalities: Pincher Creek No. 9 M.D., Ranchland No. 26 M.D., Foothills County, Rocky View County, Mountain View County, Clearwater County, Wetaskiwin No. 10 County, Brazeau County, Parkland County, Yellowhead County, Lac Ste. Anne County
- Towns: Diamond Valley, Cochrane, Sundre, Rocky Mountain House, Drayton Valley, Mayerthorpe
- Villages: Longview, Cremona, Caroline

Highway system
- Alberta Provincial Highway Network; List; Former
← Highway 21	→ Highway 22X

Highway 22, officially named Cowboy Trail, is a 584-kilometre (363 mi) highway in the Canadian province of Alberta. It generally parallels Highway 2, beginning in the foothills of southern Alberta at Highway 3 near Lundbreck Falls. It proceeds north along the eastern slopes of the Rocky Mountains passing through the foothills and ranch country to the aspen parkland of northern Alberta, ending at Highway 18 near Mayerthorpe.

Cowboy Trail continues south and east of Highway 22 by following Highway 3 to Pincher Creek, Highway 6 to Waterton Lakes National Park, and Highway 5 to Cardston.

Alberta Transportation is currently constructing a new interchange at the over-saturated intersection of Highways 22 and 1A in Cochrane. There are also long-term plans for twinning from Bragg Creek to the north end of Cochrane, and the implementation of passing lanes near the highway's south end.

== Route description ==
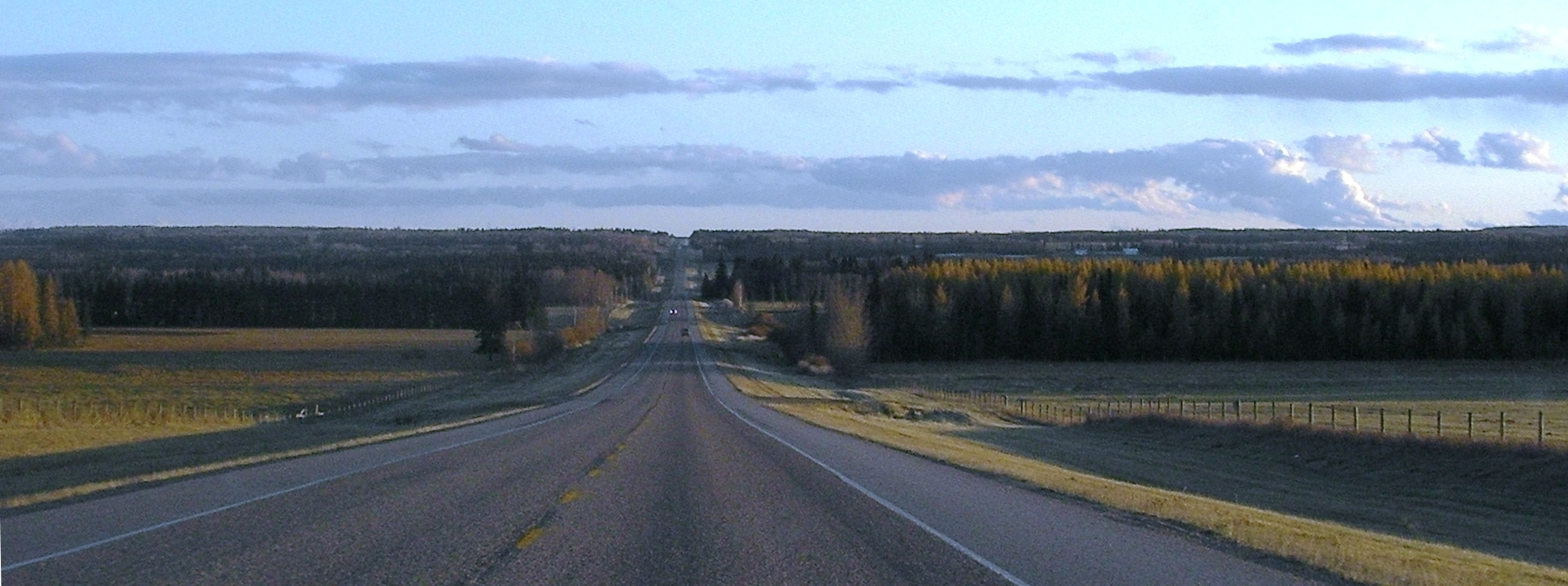
Southbound Highway 22, north of Sundre

=== Overview ===
Highway 22 is the longest and most significant north–south highway in south and central Alberta, aside from Highway 2. It serves as the main artery for the western areas of the Calgary–Edmonton Corridor and the Calgary Metropolitan Region. Having historically run through a lightly populated area – and being paralleled by the 4 lane, higher speed Highway 2 less than 100 kilometres east – Highway 22 did not initially see much traffic. It was built as a 2 lane road with only a handful of passing lanes on its long length, and only a single interchange at Highway 1. Since the mid-1990s, the region west of Calgary has experienced rapid growth, creating heavy traffic on sections of Highway 22, particularly between Diamond Valley and Sundre.

=== Southern Alberta ===
Highway 22 begins as a two-lane rural highway in the Municipal District of Pincher Creek No. 9 near Lundbreck Falls at Highway 3, the Crowsnest Highway. It proceeds north across increasingly flatter terrain of the foothills, parallel to the Oldman River, and then crosses it before entering the Municipal District of Ranchland No. 66, there are no significant communities in this area. The highway winds to the east of the Black Heritage Rangeland Natural Area, intersecting Highway 520 which branches east to meet Highway 2 at Claresholm. Highway 22 continues north through scenic terrain to the Chain Lakes Reservoir, from which Highway 533 splits east to meet Highway 2 at Nanton. Farther north the highway continues through Longview, Diamond Valley (made up of the former twin towns of Black Diamond and Turner Valley), and Millarville. The highway then jogs west at a T intersection with Highway 22X. Approximately 30 km (19 mi) later, the road turns north again at a T intersection with Highway 66 and passes through a corner of Bragg Creek where there is a signal light. Highway 22 then cuts though a corner of the Tsuu T'ina 145 Reservation passing by the community of Redwood Meadows. Immediately after exiting the reservation Highway 22 reaches an important Roundabout junction at Highway 8, enters Rocky View County and then crosses the Elbow River. From there it heads north past an interchange at the Trans-Canada Highway (Highway 1) and reaches the Town of Cochrane which with a population over 30,000 is eligible for city status.

=== Cochrane ===
Highway 22 serves as Cochrane's main north–south artery. Upon entering Cochrane the two lane highway passes through a major signalized intersection at Fireside Gate/James Walker Trail before dipping down into the Bow River Valley (with an southbound uphill passing lane) before meeting another signal light at George Fox Trail. It then crosses the Bow River on a 2 lane bridge. Upon reaching the other side of the river it passes through three more signal lights at Griffin Road, Quigley Drive and Bow Valley Trail (Highway 1A) in short succession (the later is currently being replaced with an interchange). It then proceeds up a hill (with a northbound uphill passing lane) out of the river valley before meeting one final signal light at Sunset Drive. Shortly afterwards Highway 22 exits the city.

=== Central Alberta ===
Immediately after leaving Cochrane Highway 22 passes the Hamlet of Cochrane Lake and then an important intersection with Highway 567. From there it continues north to the Village of Cremona and then meets Highway 27 at another T intersection. After jogging west it reaches Sundre where it once again turns north to Caroline. After another short westward jog the highway crosses the Red Deer River and heads north to Rocky Mountain House where it runs a short concurrency with Highway 11. From there it continues north to Highway 39 where it jogs west for the fourth time crossing the North Saskatchewan River and reaching Drayton Valley. It continues north from Drayton Valley and reaches Highway 16 (Yellowhead Highway) at Entwistle approximately 85 km (53 mi) west of Edmonton. After a 8 km (5 mi) westbound concurrency with Highway 16, it continues north to cross Highway 43 in Mayerthorpe and ends 7 km (4 mi) north of the town at Highway 18.

== History ==
The original alignment of Highway 22 started at Highway 2 (Macleod Trail) south of Calgary and travelled west to Priddis, where it turned south to Turner Valley and terminated at Highway 7 in Black Diamond. In the 1970s, the province of Alberta began upgrading a series of roads to form a north–south, all-weather highway west of Highway 2. Beginning in c. 1972, the road connecting the Trans-Canada Highway and Cochrane was designated as part of Highway 22. In c. 1973, the numbered secondary highway system appeared, with the road between Cochrane and Highway 27 being designated as Highway 922 (the paved section between Cremona and Bottrel became Highway 22) while the road between Priddis and Bragg Creek was briefly designated as Highway 553, becoming Highway 922 in 1975. Throughout the remainder of the 1970s, Highway 922 was extended from Highway 3 in the south to Highway 57 near Drayton Valley in the north. Coinciding with Highway 922 being paved in c. 1976, Highway 22 was extended from Cochrane to Cremona, while the following year it replaced Highway 922 between the Trans-Canada Highway and Priddis; as part of the project, the section between Priddis and Macleod Trail was renumbered as Highway 22X. In c. 1980, all remaining gravel sections of Highway 922 were reclassified as Highway 22, along with a 18 km (11 mi) section of Highway 7 between Black Diamond and Longview, a 56 km (35 mi) section of Highway 57 between Drayton Valley and Entwistle (the remaining 27 km (17 mi) section of Highway 57 became part of Highway 39) and Highway 755 between Highway 16 and Mayerthorpe. Throughout the 1980s, Highway 22 was paved, with all but a small section near Chain Lakes Provincial Park being completed by 1990 (the latter was completed in the mid-1990s).

In 2014, a new $52 million bridge across the North Saskatchewan River near Drayton Valley was completed, replacing the original bridge which was constructed in 1957.

In 2019 the cloverleaf interchange where Highway 22 crosses Highway 1 was modified for safety reasons as part of a rehabilitation project resulting in two out of four loop ramps being removed a new signal light being added on Highway 22.

Starting in 2022 the section of Highway 22 between Highway 1 and Highway 8 began to be realigned and raised to avoid being flooded by the new Springbank dry reservoir in the event of a major flood. The project also included the construction of a bridge carrying Highway 22 over a new canal that will feed the reservoir.

== Future ==
In April 2017, Alberta Transportation announced plans for a new interchange at Highway 1A in Cochrane. After years of delay construction finally began in May 2023, the interchange is expected to take 3 years to complete. When finished it will be the first interchange to provided a free flowing movement to Highway 22 though traffic.

Alberta Transportation's 2024 Provincial Construction Program shows new roundabouts on Highway 22 in Bragg Creek and at Highway 567 in the detailed design phase which implies that Alberta Transportation intends to construct them within the next two years. Plans to 4 lane Highway 22 within Cochrane including the construction a new bridge across the Bow River were also referenced as undergoing engineering assessment in the 2024 Construction Program which will likely result in this section being the first 4 lane portion of Highway 22.

Alberta Transportation retained Tetra Tech EBA to complete a study in the feasibility of new passing lanes over a 118 km (73 mi) distance of Highway 22 between Highways 3 and 543. The study was published in August 2011 and determined that passing lanes are justified at several locations, but at the time Alberta Transportation had no plans to proceed with the project. However these passing lanes were also mentioned as undergoing engineering assessment in the 2024 Provincial Construction Program implying that they will likely be built in the near future.

Alberta Transportation has plans to twin Highway 22 between Cochrane and Highway 8 with a longer term widening of up to 6 lanes. These plans also include upgrading the interchange at Highway 1; no timeline has been set for construction.

== Major intersections ==
From south to north:

Rural/specialized municipality	Location	km	mi	Destinations	Notes
M.D. of Pincher Creek No. 9	Lundbreck	0.0	0.0	Highway 3 – Fort Macleod, Lethbridge, Crowsnest Pass	Highway 22 southern terminus; Cowboy Trail follows Highway 3 east to Highway 6 south
M.D. of Pincher Creek No. 9		24.2	15.0	Crosses Oldman River	
M.D. of Ranchland No. 66		44.4	27.6	Highway 520 east – Claresholm, Barons	
M.D. of Ranchland No. 66	Chain Lakes; Provincial Park	71.3	44.3	Highway 533 east / PAR 152 west – Nanton	
M.D. of Ranchland No. 66		82.2	51.1	Highway 532 west – Don Getty Wildland Provincial Park	
Foothills County	Bar U Ranch N.H.S.	96.5	60.0	Highway 540 east – Pekisko, Cayley	
Foothills County	Longview	109.1	67.8	Crosses the Highwood River	
Foothills County	Longview	110.5	68.7	Highway 541 west – Kananaskis Country	
Foothills County		117.9	73.3	Highway 543 east – High River	
Diamond Valley		127.6	79.3	Highway 7 east – Okotoks	Formerly Black Diamond
Diamond Valley		128.4	79.8	Crosses the Sheep River	
Diamond Valley		131.6	81.8	Highway 546 west – Sheep River Provincial Park	Formerly Turner Valley
Foothills County	Millarville	142.9	88.8	Highway 549 west	South end of Highway 549 concurrency
Foothills County		146.1	90.8	Highway 549 east – Okotoks	North end of Highway 549 concurrency
Foothills County	Priddis	159.1	98.9	Highway 22X east – Calgary	
Foothills County		175.9	109.3	Highway 762 south – Millarville	
↑ / ↓		176.2	109.5	Highway 66 west – Elbow Falls	
Rocky View County	Bragg Creek	179.6	111.6	Highway 758 south – Bragg Creek Provincial Park	
Tsuu T'ina Nation No. 145	Redwood Meadows	185.3	115.1	Redwood Meadows Drive	
Rocky View County		190.2	118.2	Highway 8 east – Calgary	Roundabout
Rocky View County		191.3	118.9	Crosses the Elbow River	
Rocky View County		197.3	122.6	Highway 1 (TCH) – Calgary, Banff	Interchange; Highway 1 exit 161
Cochrane		208.3	129.4	Crosses the Bow River	
Cochrane		210.1	130.6	Highway 1A (Bow Valley Trail) – Calgary, Canmore	Interchange under construction
Rocky View County		218.5	135.8	Highway 567 east – Airdrie	Roundabout
Rocky View County	Bottrel	234.9	146.0	Highway 574 east – Madden, Crossfield	
Mountain View County		245.4	152.5	Highway 579 west – Water Valley	
Mountain View County	Cremona	250.0	155.3	Highway 580 east – Carstairs	
Mountain View County		265.3	164.8	Highway 582 east – Didsbury	
Mountain View County		277.2	172.2	Highway 27 east – Olds	South end of Highway 27 concurrency
Mountain View County	Westward Ho	278.9	173.3	Crosses the Little Red Deer River	
Sundre		287.3	178.5	Highway 760 south – Bergen	
Sundre		287.6	178.7	Crosses the Red Deer River	
Sundre		289.6	179.9	Highway 27 ends / Highway 584 west – Bearberry	Highway 27 western terminus; north end of Highway 27 concurrency
Mountain View County	No major junctions				
↑ / ↓		304.1	189.0	Crosses the James River	
Clearwater County	James River Bridge	306.0	190.1	Highway 587 east – Bowden	
Clearwater County		323.1	200.8	Highway 54 east – Innisfail	South end of Highway 54 concurrency
Clearwater County	Caroline	328.0	203.8		
Clearwater County		335.9	208.7	Crosses the Clearwater River	
Clearwater County		336.1	208.8	Highway 54 ends / Highway 591 west – Ricinus	Highway 54 western terminus; north end of Highway 54 concurrency
Clearwater County		353.9	219.9	Crosses the Clearwater River	
Clearwater County		361.2	224.4	Highway 11 east – Red Deer	South end of Highway 11 concurrency
Clearwater County		366.2	227.5	Township Road 392 to Highway 752 south	
Rocky Mountain House		369.6	229.7	Highway 11A west / Highway 598 east (52 Avenue) – Rocky Mountain House National Historic Site	
Rocky Mountain House		373.1	231.8	Highway 11 west – Nordegg, Saskatchewan River Crossing	North end of Highway 11 concurrency
Clearwater County		379.8	236.0	Highway 12 east – Lacombe	
Clearwater County		406.5	252.6	Highway 53 east – Rimbey, Ponoka	
County of Wetaskiwin No. 10		433.4	269.3	Highway 13 – Alder Flats, Wetaskiwin	
Brazeau County		452.9	281.4	Highway 616 – Buck Creek, Breton	
Brazeau County		464.6	288.7	Highway 39 east – Leduc	
Brazeau County		470.0	292.0	Crosses the North Saskatchewan River	
Drayton Valley		474.0	294.5	50 Street	Business route south end
Drayton Valley		475.1	295.2	Highway 620 west – Lodgepole, Brazeau Reservoir	
Drayton Valley		478.3	297.2	50 Avenue	
Drayton Valley		479.8	298.1	50 Street	Business route north end
Brazeau County	Rocky Rapids	485.2	301.5	Highway 621 west – Cynthia	
↑ / ↓		494.9	307.5	Highway 624 east – Tomahawk	
Parkland County	Entwistle	519.9	323.1	Highway 16 (TCH/YH) east – Edmonton Highway 16A west – Entwistle	Interchange; Highway 16 exit 289; south end of Highway 16 concurrency
↑ / ↓	↑ / ↓	520.9	323.7	Crosses the Pembina River	
Yellowhead County	Evansburg	522.1	324.4	UAR 115 north	
Yellowhead County		527.8	328.0	Highway 16 (TCH/YH) west – Jasper	North end of Highway 16 concurrency
Yellowhead County		528.5	328.4	Highway 16A – Wildwood, Evansburg	
Lac Ste. Anne County		561.1	348.7	Highway 647 west – Anselmo	
Lac Ste. Anne County	Mayerthorpe	567.3	352.5	Highway 43 – Whitecourt, Grande Prairie, Edmonton	
Lac Ste. Anne County		574.3	356.9	Highway 18 – Green Court, Barrhead	Highway 22 northern terminus
1.000 mi = 1.609 km; 1.000 km = 0.621 mi: Concurrency terminus
