= Chain Lakes Provincial Park =

Provincial park in Alberta, Canada

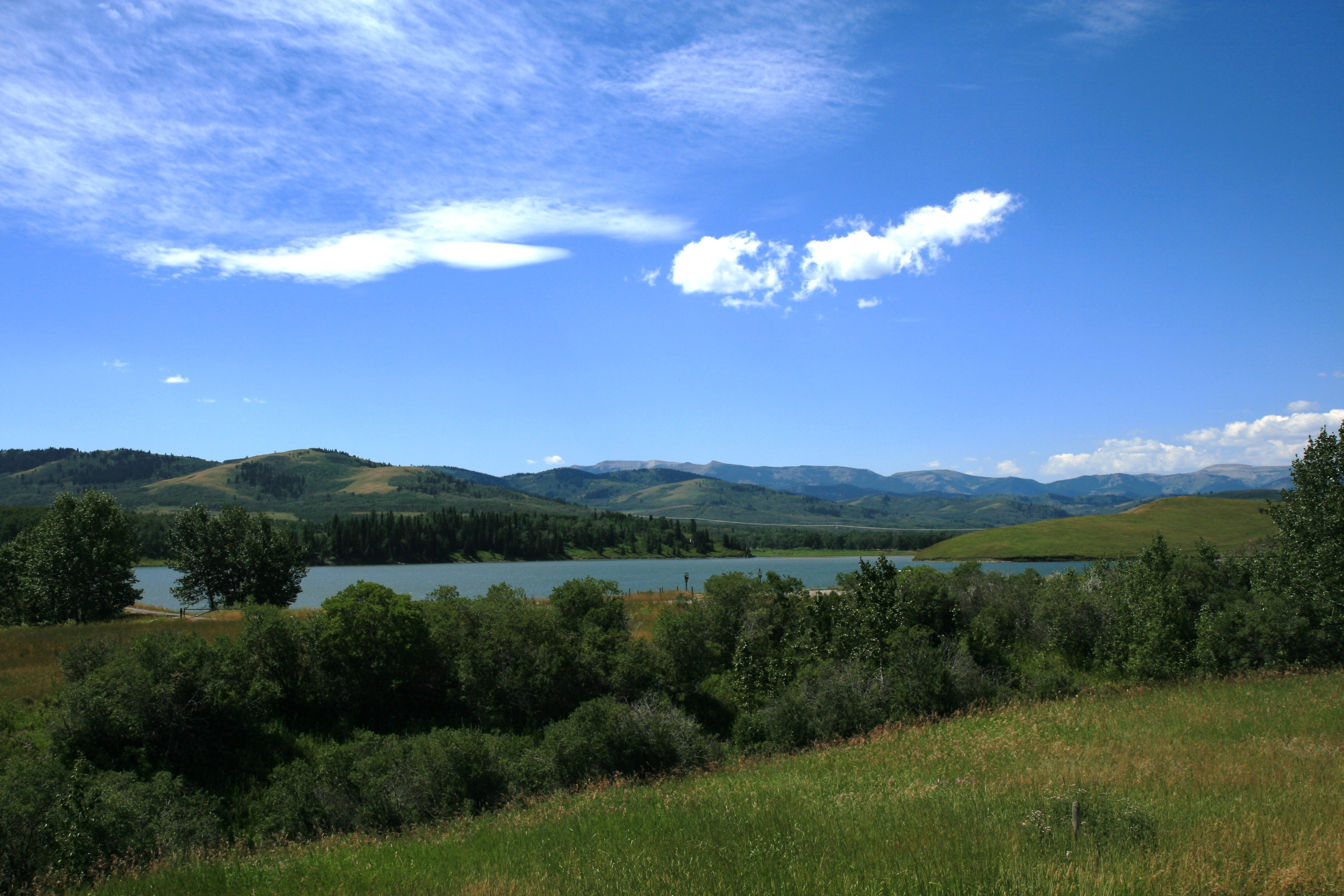

- Location within Alberta
- Interactive map of Chain Lakes Provincial Park
- Location: Municipal District of Ranchland No. 66, Alberta Canada
- Nearest city: Nanton
- Coordinates: 50°12′24″N 114°11′47″W
- Area: 4.4 km^{2} (1.7 sq mi)
- Established: December 23, 1969
- Governing body: Alberta Tourism, Parks and Recreation

Chain Lakes Provincial Park is a provincial park located in the foothills of the Rocky Mountains west of Nanton, Alberta, Canada. It was established along the Chain Lakes Reservoir. The Cowboy Trail runs along the eastern boundary of the park. The park is located 1 1/2 hours southwest of Calgary and about the same distance from Lethbridge to the northwest.

== Facilities and activities ==
Chain Lakes Provincial Park is open year-round and offers camping and day use facilities. Camping facilities include individual sites with power and a group camp large enough for about 15–20 recreational vehicles and tents. Day use facilities include picnic tables and heated kitchen shelters.

Year-round fishing is a popular activity. The reservoir is regularly stocked with lake trout. A number of walking trails of various lengths and levels are located throughout the park.

== See also ==
- List of Alberta provincial parks
- List of Canadian provincial parks
- List of National Parks of Canada
