= Cochrane Lake, Alberta =

Cochrane Lake Cochrane Lake Subdivision
- Hamlet
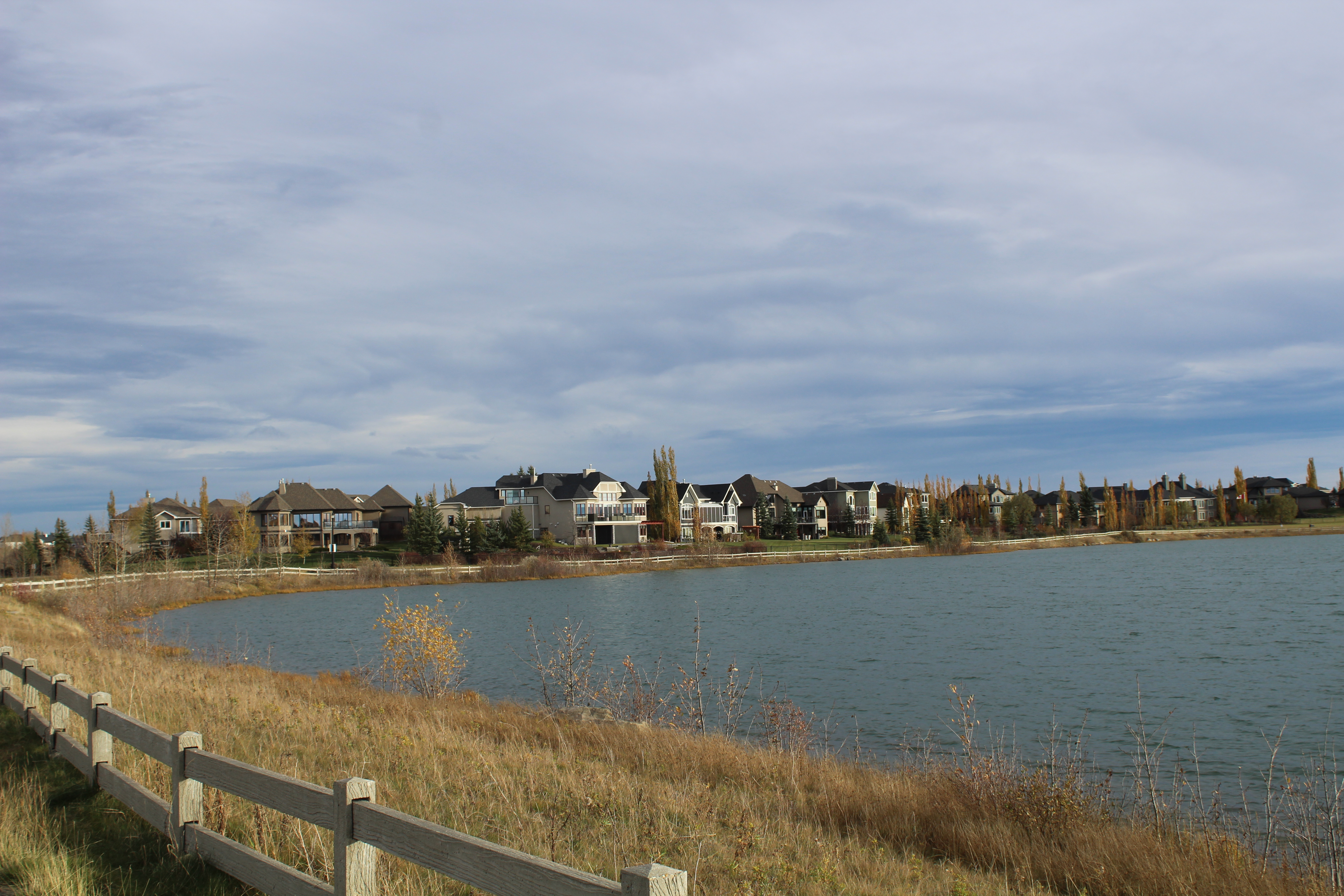
- Cochrane lake in October

- Location of Cochrane Lake Subd. Cochrane Lake (Canada)
- Coordinates: 51°14′42″N 114°29′11″W
- Country: Canada
- Province: Alberta
- Region: Calgary Metropolitan Region
- Census division: 6
- Municipal district: Rocky View County

Government
  - Type: Unincorporated
  - Governing body: Rocky View County Council

Area (2021)
  - Land: 3.8 km^{2} (1.5 sq mi)

Population (2021)
  - Total: 767
  - Density: 201.9/km^{2} (523/sq mi)
- Time zone: UTC−06:00 (Alberta Time)
- Area codes: 403, 587, 825

Cochrane Lake is a hamlet in southern Alberta under the jurisdiction of Rocky View County. Statistics Canada also recognizes a smaller portion of the hamlet as a designated place under the name of Cochrane Lake Subdivision.

Cochrane Lake is located approximately 45 km (23 mi) northwest of the City of Calgary and 1.6 km (1.0 mi) north of the Town of Cochrane on the west side of Highway 22. Cochrane Lake gets its name from Senator Matthew Henry Cochrane who in 1881 founded the Cochrane Ranche (later known as the British-American Ranche) which was a major producer of beef.

Cochrane Lake is also currently the site of a housing development, managed by property developer Monterra.

== Demographics ==
Population history of Cochrane Lake Subdivision
| Year | Pop. | ±% |
|---|---|---|
| 1981 | 104 | — |
| 1986 | 118 | +13.5% |
| 1991 | 144 | +22.0% |
| 1996 | 148 | +2.8% |
| 2001 | 157 | +6.1% |
| 2006 | 182 | +15.9% |
| 2011 | 136 | −25.3% |
| 2016 | 139 | +2.2% |
Source: Statistics Canada

Population history of Cochrane Lake
| Year | Pop. | ±% |
|---|---|---|
| 2016 | 799 | — |
| 2021 | 767 | −4.0% |
Source: Statistics Canada

In the 2021 Census of Population conducted by Statistics Canada, Cochrane Lake had a population of 767 living in 240 of its 252 total private dwellings, a change of −4% from its 2016 population of 799. With a land area of 3.8 km^{2} (1.5 sq mi), it had a population density of 201.8/km^{2} (522.8/sq mi) in 2021.

The population of Cochrane Lake according to the 2018 municipal census conducted by Rocky View County is 769. Rocky View County's 2013 municipal census counted a population of 792 in the Hamlet of Cochrane Lake, a 226% change from its 2006 municipal census population of 243.

== See also ==
- List of communities in Alberta
- List of designated places in Alberta
- List of hamlets in Alberta
