= Bottrel =

- Hamlet
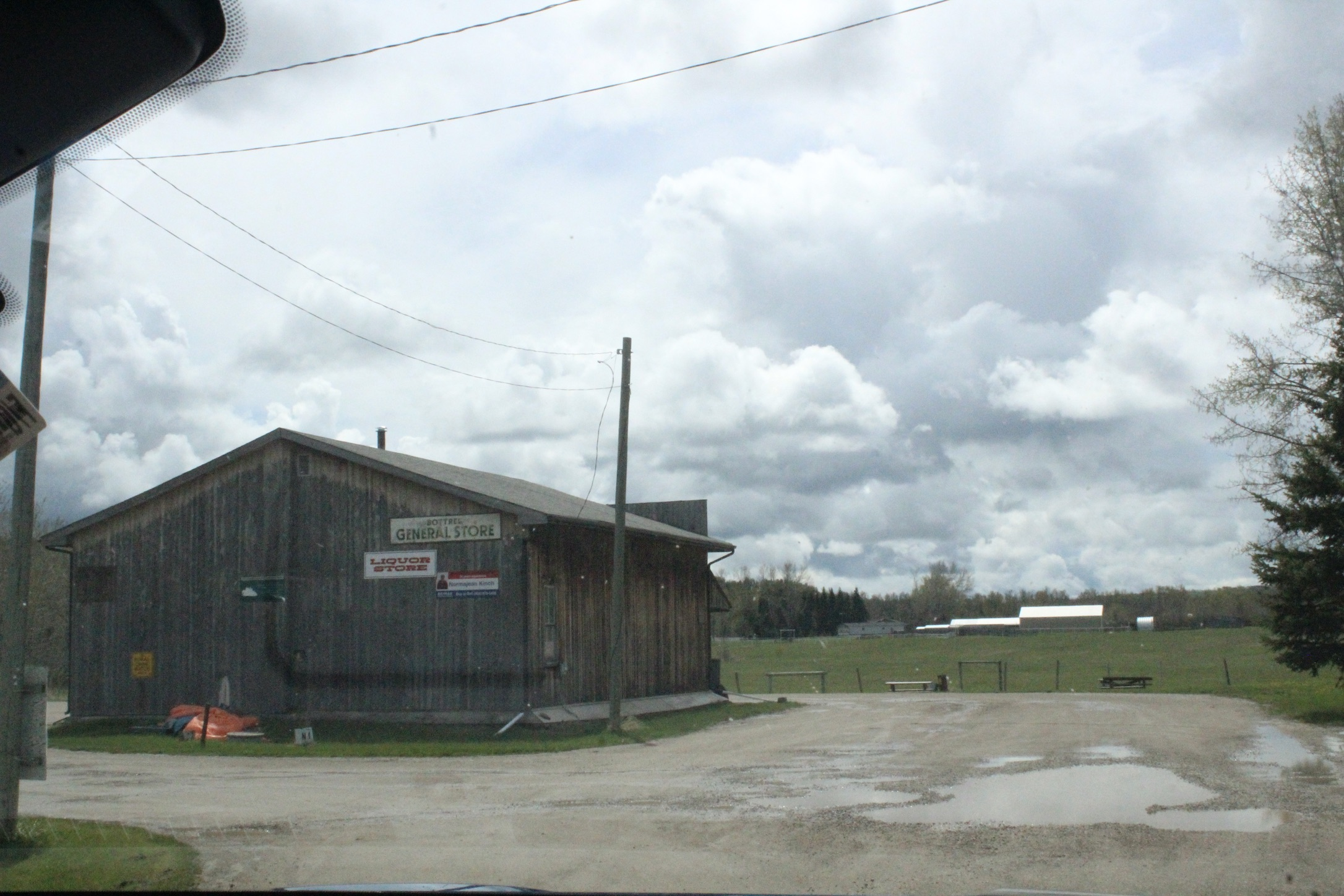

- Location of Bottrel Bottrel (Canada)
- Coordinates: 51°24′07″N 114°28′13″W
- Country: Canada
- Province: Alberta
- Region: Calgary Metropolitan Region
- Census division: 6
- Municipal district: Rocky View County

Government
  - Type: Unincorporated
  - Governing body: Rocky View County Council

Population (2018)
  - Total: 5
- Time zone: UTC−06:00 (Alberta Time)
- Area codes: 403, 587, 825

Bottrel is a hamlet in southern Alberta under the jurisdiction of Rocky View County.

Bottrel is located approximately 65 km (40 mi) northwest of Calgary, just off Highway 22. Bottrel features a historic general store with campground.

Edward Botterel was an early settler who arrived in the area c. 1888. The local post office operated from December 1, 1909 to March 31, 1969, and was named after Edward Botterel despite the erroneous spelling at its adoption. The error was never corrected and the current spelling is locally used.

== Demographics ==
The population of Bottrel according to the 2018 municipal census conducted by Rocky View County is 5.

== See also ==
- List of communities in Alberta
- List of hamlets in Alberta
