= Elbow Valley =

Elbow Valley may refer to:

- Elbow Valley, Alberta in Canada
- Elbow Valley, Queensland in Australia
