= James River Bridge, Alberta =

Unincorporated community in Clearwater County, Alberta, Canada

Coordinates: 51.9408°N 114.6383°W

Location of James River Bridge Alberta

James River Bridge is an unincorporated community in central Alberta in Clearwater County, located 2 kilometres (1.2 mi) east of Highway 22, 65 kilometres (40 mi) southwest of Red Deer.

== History ==
The settlement takes its name from the adjacent river crossing over the James River, a tributary originating in the Rocky Mountains and draining eastward into the Red Deer River. The river itself (along with James Pass and James Lake) honors Chief James Dickson, a notable leader of the Stoney Nakoda who was a signatory to Treaty 7 in 1877.

Before Europeans settled the region, the river corridor was used by Indigenous hunting and trading parties traveling the eastern slopes of the Canadian Rockies.

In the early 1900s, European and Canadian homesteaders began claiming quarter-sections throughout the heavily timbered foothills between Sundre, Caroline, and Rocky Mountain House. Covered with forests of lodgepole pine, white spruce, and poplar, these settlers cleared the area for pastures for cattle grazing and mixed grain crops.

River crossings and later wooden bridges became important places in the pioneer era. As a node of the community, the first homesteading families started the James River School, a one-room schoolhouse, in 1921. A local country general store called the James River Bridge Store was opened near the river crossing in the 1920s, too. It became the area's primary hub for trade, provisions, and mail delivery.

Ranching, livestock hauling, and small-scale logging operations sustained the area for the next 50 years. Starting in the 1950s, Alberta’s oil and gas sector explored the area extensively, and by the 1980s resulted in numerous oil and sour gas wells, compression facilities, and pipeline networks. In 1956, the James River Bridge School was amalgamated into the nearby Caroline School.

Today, workers in the petroleum extraction and service sectors along with multi-generational ranching families use the James River Bridge Country Store as a focal point. Local residents and passing travelers on the scenic route off Highway 22 all gather there for supplies, as well as a seasonal farmers market.

In the 2010s, area residents, ranchers, and energy operators mounted a concerted campaign with Clearwater County to preserve and rehabilitate the aging James River Bridge, emphasizing its critical role in moving agricultural equipment, avoiding heavy highway detour traffic, and maintaining rapid emergency response times for nearby sour gas infrastructure. It still stands today.
