= James River (Alberta) =

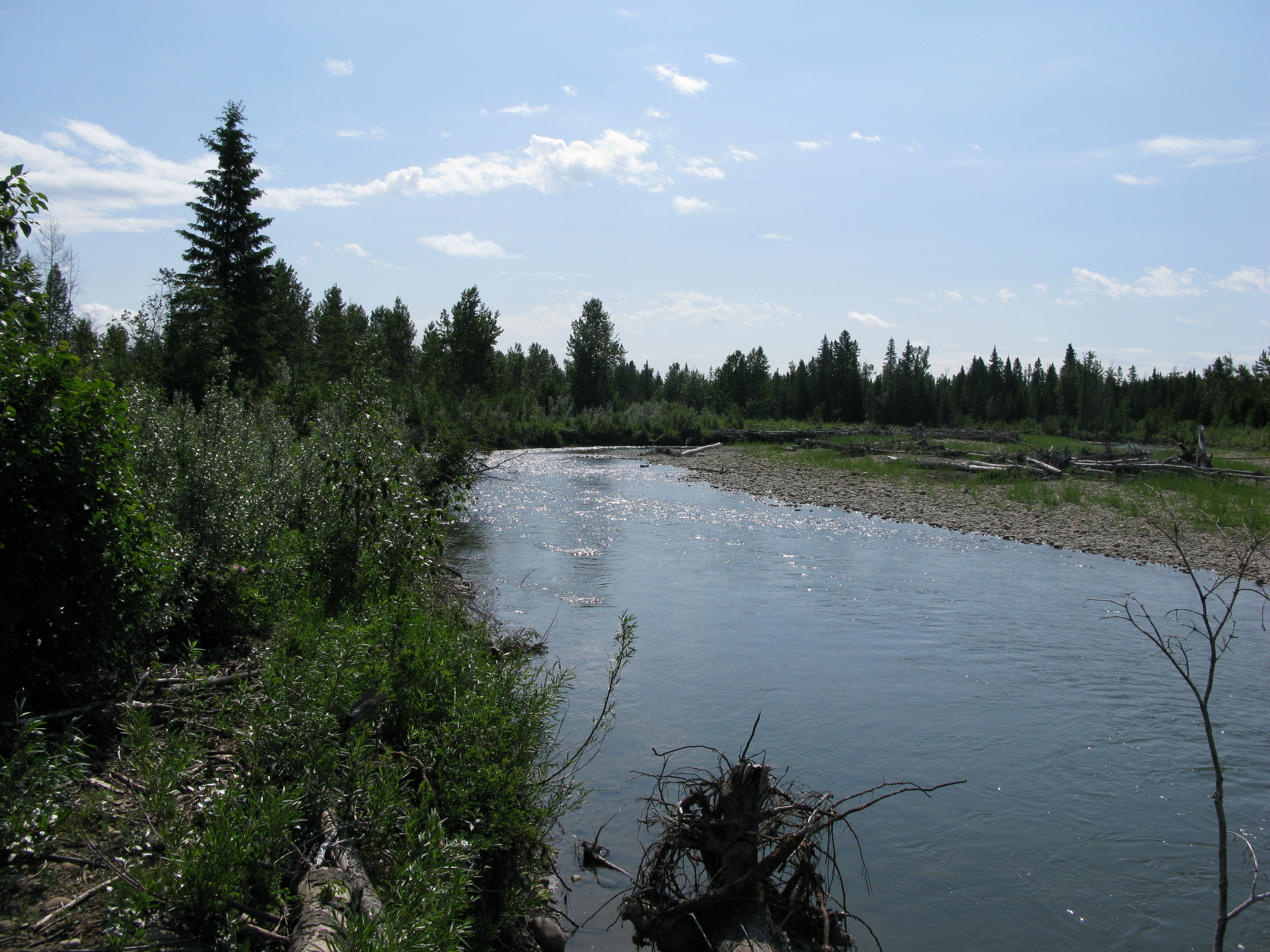
- The James River near Sundre, Alberta

Location
- Country: Canada
- Province: Alberta

Physical characteristics
- Source
  - location: James Lake
  - coordinates: 51°43′55″N 115°25′56″W
  - elevation: 1,673 m (5,489 ft)
- Mouth
  - location: Red Deer River
  - coordinates: 51°54′31″N 114°33′51″W
  - elevation: 1,027 m (3,369 ft)

The James River is a medium-sized river in central Alberta. It is a tributary of the Red Deer River.

== Geography ==
The river forms in the Rocky Mountains and flows eastward before joining the Red Deer River. The Forestry Trunk Road follows the river for much of its course. The James River is also bridged by Alberta Highway 22 near the unincorporated community of James River Bridge.

== Wildlife ==
Species of fish commonly found in the river include the brown trout, rainbow trout, mountain whitefish, northern pike and a few others.

== Naming ==
The James River, as well as James Pass and James Lake, are named after James Dickson, a Stoney Chief who signed Treaty 7 with the Canadian government in 1877.

== Tributaries ==
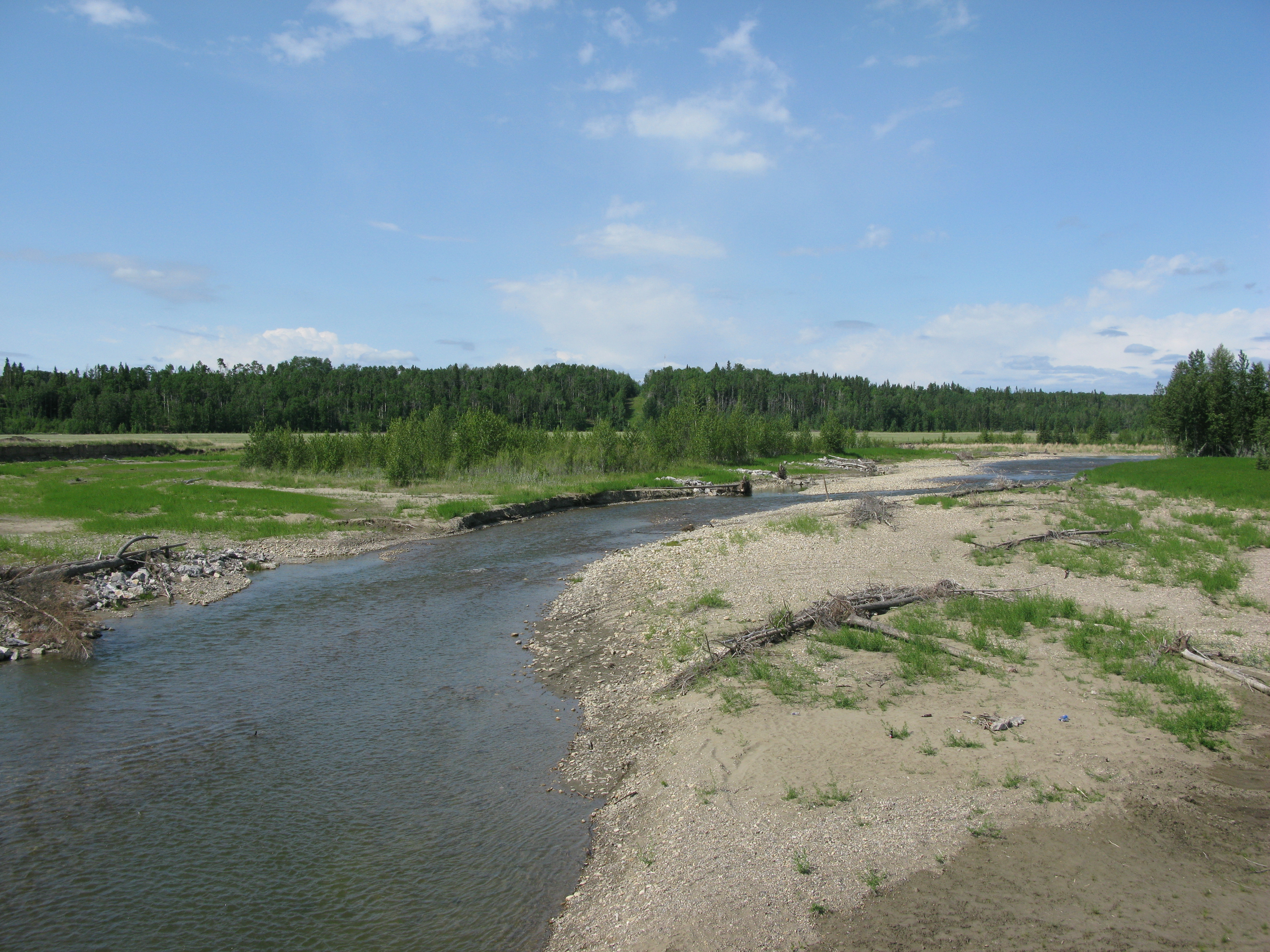
The James River near Sundre, Alberta

- Bridgeland Creek
- Windfall Creek
- Willson Creek
  - Sawtooth Creek
- South James River
  - Parker Creek
- Teepee Pole Creek
- Stony Creek
  - Burnstick Lake
- Pekse Creek

== See also ==
- List of Alberta rivers
