= Redwood Meadows =

- Townsite
- Townsite of Redwood Meadows
- Location of Redwood Meadows in Alberta
- Coordinates: 50.988°N 114.509°W
- Country: Canada
- Province: Alberta
- Region: Calgary Region
- Census division: No. 6
- Indian reserve: Tsuu T'ina Nation 145

Government
  - Governing bodies: Townsite of Redwood Meadows Administration Society and Tsuut’ina Nation Council
  - Mayor: Paul Sawler

Area (2016)
  - Land: 1.82 km^{2} (0.70 sq mi)
- Elevation: 1,250 m (4,100 ft)

Population (2016)
  - Total: 1,053
- Time zone: UTC−06:00 (Alberta Time)
- Forward sortation area: T3Z
- Area codes: +1-403, +1-587
- Website: Official website

Redwood Meadows is a townsite in Alberta, Canada—the only such entity recognized by Alberta Municipal Affairs as of August 2020.

Redwood Meadows is unique in that it is partially independent, functioning similar to an incorporated Alberta town. It is different from all other Alberta towns due to:

- its location within the Tsuut'ina 145 Indian reserve;
- the leased nature of the land on which it is developed.
- being administered by an elected council under a stewardship agreement with the Tsuut’ina Nation.

The Townsite of Redwood Meadows is located along Highway 22, approximately 20 km west of Calgary, 18 km south of Cochrane and 5 km northeast of Bragg Creek. It has an elevation of 1,250 metres (4,100 ft) and is approximately 400 acres (1.6 km^{2}) in size (1.62 km^{2} or 0.6 sq mi).

Redwood Meadows is located in census division No. 6 and in the federal riding of Foothills.

== Administration ==
Although the Townsite of Redwood Meadows is located within the Tsuut'ina 145 Indian reserve, it has its own council consisting of a mayor and six councillors.

== History ==
In the early 1970s, the land upon which Redwood Meadows is developed was leased to Sarcee Developments Ltd. (SDL), a wholly owned Tsuu T'ina company. The head lease, originally 75 years in duration, commenced in 1974 and was to terminate in 2049. Effective April 21, 2021 a new lease was signed, which is now in effect until 2095.

== Services ==
Redwood Meadows shares municipal and emergency services with nearby municipalities through various contracts and agreements. It is serviced with water, sewer, parks and roads and has a volunteer fire department. The Redwood Meadows Golf and Country Club is located in the townsite.

The Tsuut'ina police provides policing of the townsite.

== Demographics ==
Population history of Redwood Meadows
Year	Pop.	±%
1991	902	—
2011	983	+9.0%
2016	1,053	+7.1%
Source: Statistics Canada and Alberta Municipal Affairs

While Statistics Canada was unable to enumerate the population of Redwood Meadows in the 2021 Census of Population, it indicated that the community had a population of 1,053 in the 2016 Census of Population.

The Townsite of Redwood Meadows had a population of 983 in the 2011 Census according to Alberta Municipal Affairs. Its most recent municipal census prior to this indicated that it had a population of 1,150 on June 30, 2005.

== See also ==
- List of communities in Alberta
- List of Indian reserves in Alberta
