= Alberta Highway 8 =

Highway in Alberta

Highway 8

Route information
- Maintained by the Ministry of Transportation and Economic Corridors
- Length: 16.9 km (10.5 mi)
- Existed: 1980–present

Major junctions
- West end: Highway 22 near Redwood Meadows
- East end: Highway 201 in Calgary

Location
- Country: Canada
- Province: Alberta
- Specialized and rural municipalities: Rocky View County
- Major cities: Calgary

Highway system
- Alberta Numbered Highway Network; List; Former
← Highway 7	→ Highway 9

Highway 8 is a highway in southern Alberta that connects Highway 22 in Rocky View County, just north of Redwood Meadows, to Calgary. The route runs 16.9 km (10.5 mi) east from the Elbow River valley along the city's southwestern approach, crossing from rural Rocky View County into Calgary city limits before merging with Highway 201 (Stoney Trail) at the ring road.

== Route description ==
Highway 8 begins west of Calgary in a rural area of Rocky View County. Its terminus is a roundabout with Highway 22 in the Elbow River valley, situated just north of Redwood Meadows, a residential townsite established on land leased from the Tsuutʼina Nation under a head lease administered jointly by a Tsuut'ina development company and the townsite's own municipal council. From the roundabout the highway proceeds east, paralleling the Elbow River through agricultural lands as a two-lane rural highway with a posted speed limit of 100 km/h (62 mph). In Rocky View County the highway is alternately designated as Township Road 241, and after it crosses Range Road 32 the speed limit reduces to 80 km/h (50 mph) as the highway bisects the estate residential area of Elbow Valley. After a signalized intersection at Clearwater Drive / Lott Creek Boulevard, the highway then descends into the Elbow River valley before veering slightly north to cross the river, entering Calgary city limits almost immediately thereafter at 101 Street SW. East of 101 Street SW, Highway 8 merges with Highway 201 with the roadway becoming part of Stoney Trail, with it becoming a freeway and meeting a stack interchange with Sarcee Trail and Glenmore Trail that opened in 2020.

Many commercial maps show Highway 8 continuing east through Calgary along Glenmore Trail to Highway 2 (Deerfoot Trail); however, the route is unsigned.

== History ==
In the late 19th century, Calgary was a small town at the confluence of the Elbow and Bow Rivers. A lightly travelled trail led away from the town to the southwest, following the alignment of present-day Richmond Road. In the early 20th century it was called South Morley Road before being renamed to Richmond Road, and eventually led west to Springbank, Alberta remaining north of the Elbow River. A spur from the road at 101 Street SW proceeding due south across the river had been constructed by the mid‑1920s, known as Bragg Creek Road. South of the river, it veered west following the present day alignment of Highway 8 to its current terminus, where it turned south to Bragg Creek on the alignment of present-day Highway 22.

The first use of Highway 8 was as a small connector route that connected Calgary with the town of Bowness. Highway 8 began at 10 Street NW, which at the time was part of Highway 1 which passed through Downtown Calgary, crossed the Bow River along the Louise Bridge, and proceeded north and west towards Cochrane and Banff. Highway 8 travelled west on Kensington Road and Parkdale Boulevard along the north side of the Bow River, becoming Bowness Road when it entered the village of Montgomery. It crossed the original Shouldice Bridge (renamed the John Hextal Bridge) into Bowness and ended near Bowness Park. The highway was decommissioned in c. 1964 when Montgomery and Bowness were annexed by the City of Calgary.

In the mid 1970s, Alberta introduced its Secondary Highway system (present day 500-900 series highways), and Richmond Road west of Calgary was designated as Secondary Highway 559, but was renumbered in 1979 to Highway 8. Highway 8 first followed Richmond Road into Calgary to Sarcee Trail, and followed Sarcee Trail and Glenmore Trail as an unsigned highway to Deerfoot Trail. When the residential community of Signal Hill was developed in the late 1980s and Highway 8 was realigned in 1992 to the south along a new two lane roadway which also served as a western extension of Glenmore Trail. Despite it being part of Glenmore Trail, the new roadway ended a T-intersection at the transition between the existing Sarcee and Glenmore Trails; resulting in "Glenmore Trail" commonly referring to the roadway east of Sarcee Trail and "Highway 8" referring to the roadway west of Sarcee Trail, despite both officially sharing the same designations.

When the Calgary Ring Road alignment was established, it was determined that the West Leg and Southwest Leg would follow and area just east of 101 Street SW from Highway 1 south to Highway 8, travel east on Highway 8 to Sarcee Trail, and then resume heading south through the eastern perimeter of the Tsuutʼina Nation – as part of the construction the effected area of Highway 8 would become part of Stoney Trail. On October 1, 2020, upgrades to Highway 8 and the stack interchange were opened and the highway inside the ring road was redesigned as Highway 201.

As part of the Southwest Ring Road construction, approximately 2 km (1.2 mi) Highway 8 was twinned west of Calgary city limits, while a new Y-interchange at the eastern terminus of Highway 8 was scheduled to be completed in 2024 as part of the West Ring Road. This project opened on December 19, 2023, ten months ahead of originally scheduled.

== Future ==
Long-term plans call to twin the remainder of the route to Highway 22 as well as replacing the existing roundabout with an interchange, with provisions for a western extension beyond Highway 22.

== Major intersections ==
Rural/specialized municipality	Location	km	mi	Exit	Destinations	Notes
Rocky View County		0.0	0.0		Highway 22 – Cochrane, Bragg Creek	Roundabout
Rocky View County	Elbow Valley	11.4	7.1		Range Road 31	At-grade, traffic signals
Rocky View County	Elbow Valley	14.7	9.1		Lott Creek Boulevard / Clearwater Drive	At-grade, traffic signals
Rocky View County		15.9	9.9	Crosses the Elbow River		
City of Calgary		16.9	10.5		Stoney Trail (Highway 201 north)	Interchange; exit 28 on Highway 201 (Stoney Trail); becomes Highway 201 (Stoney Trail)
City of Calgary		19.5	12.1	26	69 Street SW / Discovery Ridge Boulevard	Exit numbers follow Highway 201
City of Calgary		20.5– 22.2	12.7– 13.8	24	Westhills Way / Tsuut'ina Parkway	Southbound exit and northbound entrance; Tsuut'ina Parkway under construction (unopened)
City of Calgary		20.5– 22.2	12.7– 13.8	22	Stoney Trail (Highway 201 south) / Glenmore Trail / Sarcee Trail	Former eastern extent of signed Highway 8; Stoney Trail becomes Tsuut′ina Trail south of interchange
City of Calgary		See Glenmore Trail				
City of Calgary		31.4	19.5		Deerfoot Trail (Highway 2) – Airport (YYC), Edmonton, Lethbridge Glenmore Trail	Highway 2 exit 248; former Highway 8 unsigned eastern terminus; Glenmore Trail continues east
1.000 mi = 1.609 km; 1.000 km = 0.621 mi: Closed/former
