= Elbow Valley, Alberta =

Coordinates: 50°54′00″N 114°41′59″W

Location of Elbow Valley Alberta

Elbow Valley is a rural area in the Calgary Metropolitan Region of Alberta, Canada within Rocky View County. It is adjacent to the west boundary of the City of Calgary along Highway 8. The community is bordered by Range Road 25 to the east and Range Road 31 to the west (excluding the bordering communities of Braemar Estates, Mackenas Estates, Elbow Valley West, Stonepine, Swift Creek Villas, and Lott Creek Grove). Elbow Valley is also the name used to designate a specific recreational zone southwest of the Hamlet of Bragg Creek within the Kananaskis Country park system.

== History ==
Elbow Valley gets its name from the Elbow River, a river in the region that flows into the Bow River at Fort Calgary. The name for Elbow River is descriptive and refers to the point at which it abruptly turn northward and enters the Bow River (elbow-like curve). David Thompson referred to it as "Hokaikshi" in 1814, and Arrowsmith's map of 1859 labels it "Hokaikshi" or "Moose River". The Cree called it "o-too-kwa-na" and according to Tyrell, the Stoney referred to it as "mn-no-tho-ap-ta". Until 1880, it was often called "Swift Creek", after the speed of its watercourse.

== Climate ==
Climate data for Elbow Valley, Alberta
Month	Jan	Feb	Mar	Apr	May	Jun	Jul	Aug	Sep	Oct	Nov	Dec	Year
Record high °C (°F)	18.5 (65.3)	21.0 (69.8)	21.5 (70.7)	26.0 (78.8)	29.3 (84.7)	30.8 (87.4)	35.0 (95.0)	33.1 (91.6)	31.2 (88.2)	27.2 (81.0)	20.0 (68.0)	16.0 (60.8)	35.0 (95.0)
Mean daily maximum °C (°F)	0.3 (32.5)	2.0 (35.6)	4.3 (39.7)	9.8 (49.6)	14.2 (57.6)	18.3 (64.9)	21.6 (70.9)	21.7 (71.1)	16.8 (62.2)	11.4 (52.5)	3.3 (37.9)	0.0 (32.0)	10.3 (50.5)
Daily mean °C (°F)	−7.9 (17.8)	−6.1 (21.0)	−3.3 (26.1)	2.3 (36.1)	6.7 (44.1)	10.6 (51.1)	13.2 (55.8)	12.9 (55.2)	8.3 (46.9)	3.2 (37.8)	−4.4 (24.1)	−7.9 (17.8)	2.3 (36.1)
Mean daily minimum °C (°F)	−16.1 (3.0)	−14.1 (6.6)	−10.9 (12.4)	−5.2 (22.6)	−0.9 (30.4)	2.8 (37.0)	4.7 (40.5)	4.1 (39.4)	−0.2 (31.6)	−4.9 (23.2)	−12.0 (10.4)	−15.8 (3.6)	−5.7 (21.7)
Record low °C (°F)	−44.4 (−47.9)	−43.0 (−45.4)	−39.5 (−39.1)	−28.9 (−20.0)	−15.6 (3.9)	−7.5 (18.5)	−3.0 (26.6)	−9.0 (15.8)	−18.5 (−1.3)	−32.0 (−25.6)	−42.0 (−43.6)	−45.6 (−50.1)	−45.6 (−50.1)
Average precipitation mm (inches)	23.3 (0.92)	21.9 (0.86)	41.6 (1.64)	49.2 (1.94)	101.1 (3.98)	124.6 (4.91)	66.9 (2.63)	76.9 (3.03)	66.9 (2.63)	41.4 (1.63)	32.4 (1.28)	19.9 (0.78)	665.4 (26.20)
Average rainfall mm (inches)	0.3 (0.01)	0.3 (0.01)	1.7 (0.07)	20.2 (0.80)	78.0 (3.07)	123.1 (4.85)	66.9 (2.63)	76.4 (3.01)	56.0 (2.20)	14.8 (0.58)	2.0 (0.08)	0.5 (0.02)	440.0 (17.32)
Average snowfall cm (inches)	25.5 (10.0)	23.7 (9.3)	44.8 (17.6)	30.6 (12.0)	21.2 (8.3)	1.4 (0.6)	0.0 (0.0)	0.5 (0.2)	10.3 (4.1)	28.7 (11.3)	32.8 (12.9)	20.9 (8.2)	240.4 (94.6)
Source: Environment Canada
