= Chain Lakes Reservoir =

Reservoir in Alberta, Canada

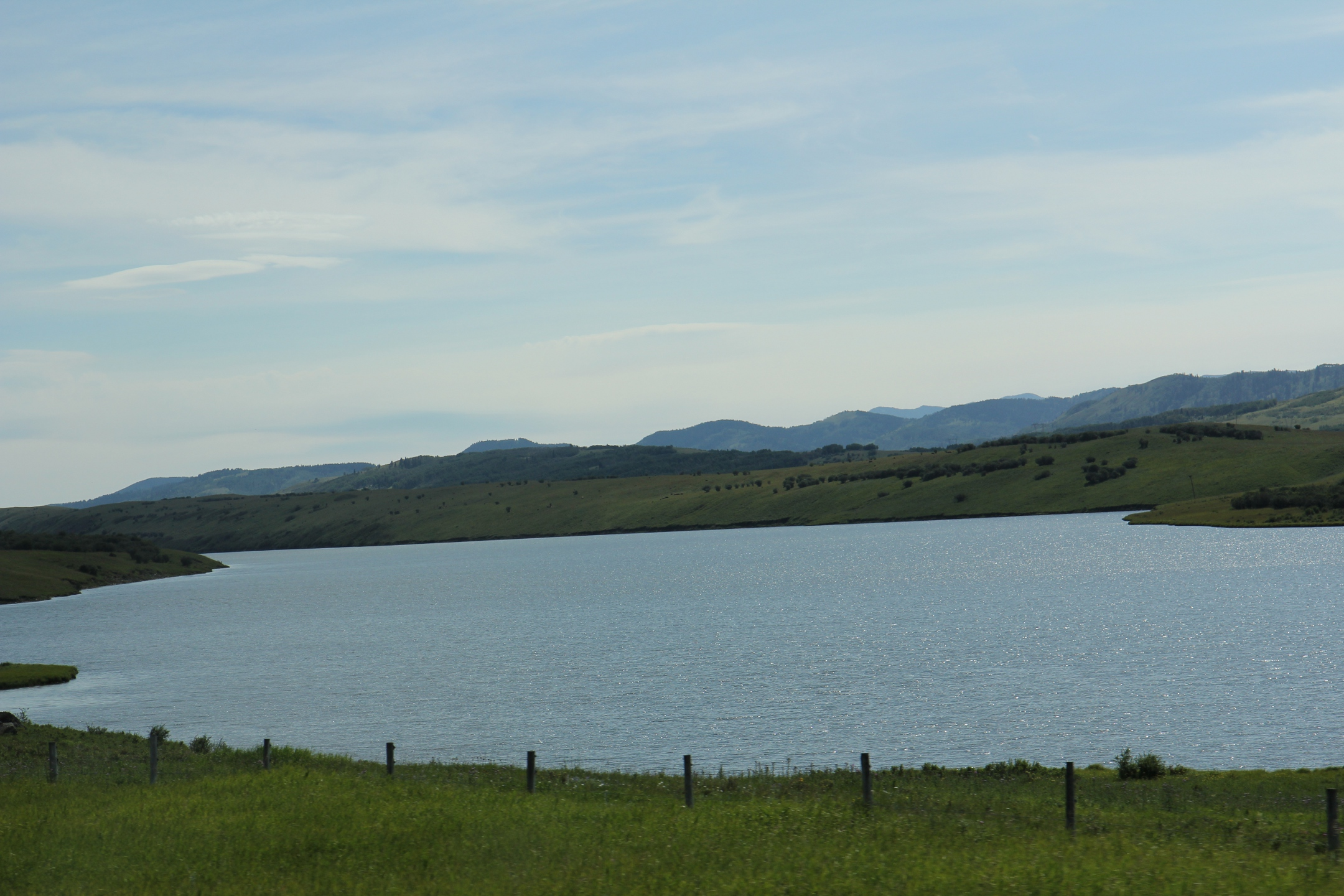

- Location within Alberta
- Location: Municipal District of Ranchland No. 66, Alberta
- Coordinates: 50°14′47″N 114°12′34″W
- Basin countries: Canada
- Max. length: 9.9 km (6.2 mi)
- Max. width: 0.3 km (0.19 mi)
- Surface area: 3.12 km^{2} (1.20 sq mi)
- Average depth: 5.4 m (18 ft)
- Max. depth: 10.4 m (34 ft)
- Surface elevation: 1,300 m (4,300 ft)
- Settlements: Longview
- References: Chain Lakes Reservoir

Chain Lakes Reservoir is a reservoir in Alberta.
