= Longview, Alberta =

Longview
- Village
- Village of Longview
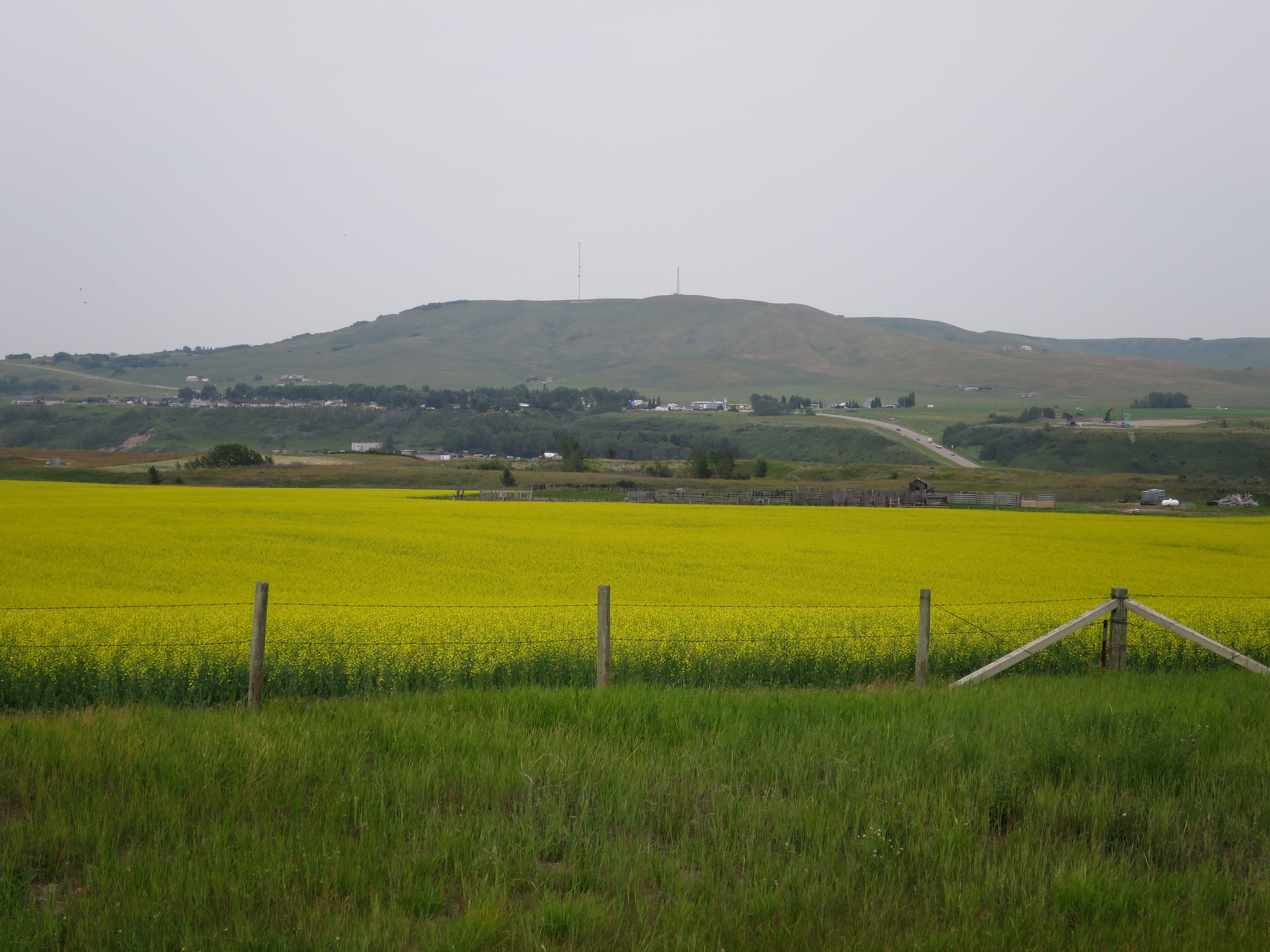
- Longview seen across the Highwood River

- Location within Alberta
- Coordinates: 50°31′58″N 114°13′51″W
- Country: Canada
- Province: Alberta
- Region: Southern Alberta
- Census Division: No. 6
- Municipal district: M.D. of Foothills No. 31
- Incorporated
  - Village: January 1, 1964

Government
  - Mayor: Kathleen Wight
  - Governing body: Longview Village Council

Area (2021)
  - Land: 1.1 km^{2} (0.42 sq mi)
- Elevation: 1,240 m (4,070 ft)

Population (2021)
  - Total: 297
  - Density: 269.6/km^{2} (698/sq mi)
- Time zone: UTC−06:00 (Alberta Time)
- Highways: 22; 541
- Waterways: Highwood River
- Website: Official website

Longview is a village in southern Alberta, Canada. It is located in the Canadian Rockies foothills, on Cowboy Trail, 32 km west of High River and 64 km south of Calgary. Highwood River flows west of the village.

Longview is notable for its western view of the front range of the Rocky Mountains, its cattle ranching history, and its natural resource sector, particularly petroleum extraction. The surrounding region features open land, the Highwood River, extensive beef production.

Longview is also known as the home of late Canadian Country Music star Ian Tyson.

== Demographics ==
In the 2021 Census of Population conducted by Statistics Canada, the Village of Longview had a population of 297 living in 135 of its 147 total private dwellings, a change of −3.3% from its 2016 population of 307. With a land area of 1.1 km^{2} (0.42 sq mi), it had a population density of 270.0/km^{2} (699.3/sq mi) in 2021.

In the 2016 Census of Population conducted by Statistics Canada, the Village of Longview recorded a population of 307 living in 140 of its 151 total private dwellings, which represents no change from its 2011 population of 307. With a land area of 1.1 km^{2} (0.42 sq mi), it had a population density of 279.1/km^{2} (722.8/sq mi) in 2016.

== History ==
The Long brothers, Thomas and Oliver, homesteaded at Big Hill, not far from where the village is now. Their last name combined with the view from the then post office, which was opened in 1908, is how the village was named. When the oilfields at Turner Valley were revived in 1936, Longview became known as Little New York. Little New York, had a sister town uphill to the north called Little Chicago. No one seems to know how Little Chicago and Little New York got their names and both towns actually grew up over night. In 1936 there was nothing there but an empty prairie field. Then, in 1937, oil was discovered at the 6,828-foot (2,081 m) level and people, most of them long out of work because of the great depression, came flocking and Little Chicago and Little New York were born. Buildings appeared like mushrooms. For the first time in years, men who without so much as a coat on their backs or a nickel in their pockets had the first money they had earned since the depression began. Today Little Chicago is gone and except a monument near the Cowboy Trail to the north of the village, little remains to show it ever existed. Little New York was more fortunate, as it is now the village of Longview.

In 1991, Clint Eastwood's Academy Award-winning film Unforgiven was filmed in and around Longview, as was the television film starring Tom Selleck, Monte Walsh.

In 2013, scenes from the movie Interstellar were filmed in Longview. The school, where Cooper (Matthew McConaughey) learns that “the world needs farmers” at the parent-teacher conference, and the ranch-house (purpose built for the film) where Cooper lives with his kids and his father (John Lithgow) are both located in Longview.

== Gallery ==
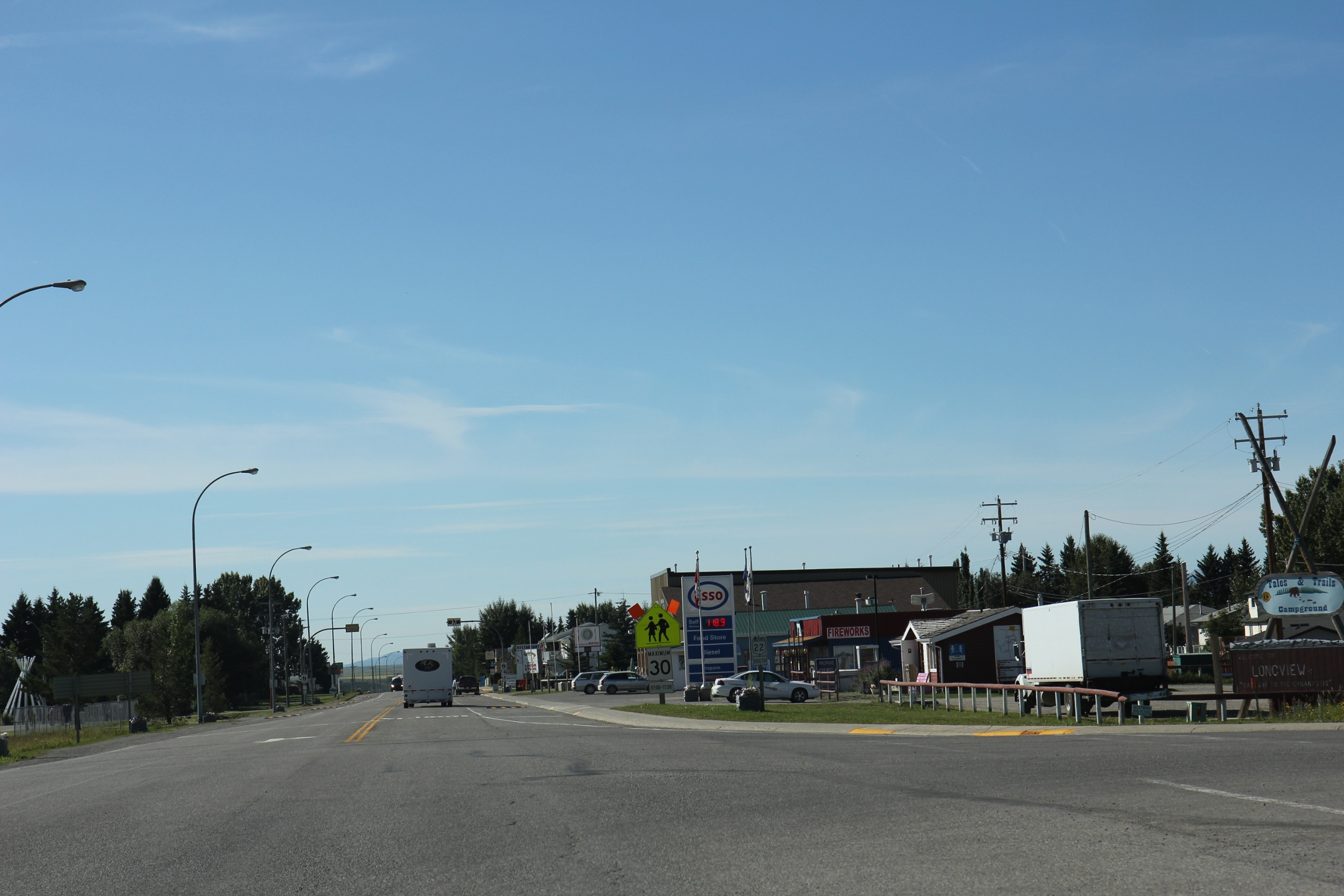
Looking south in Longview on Highway 22

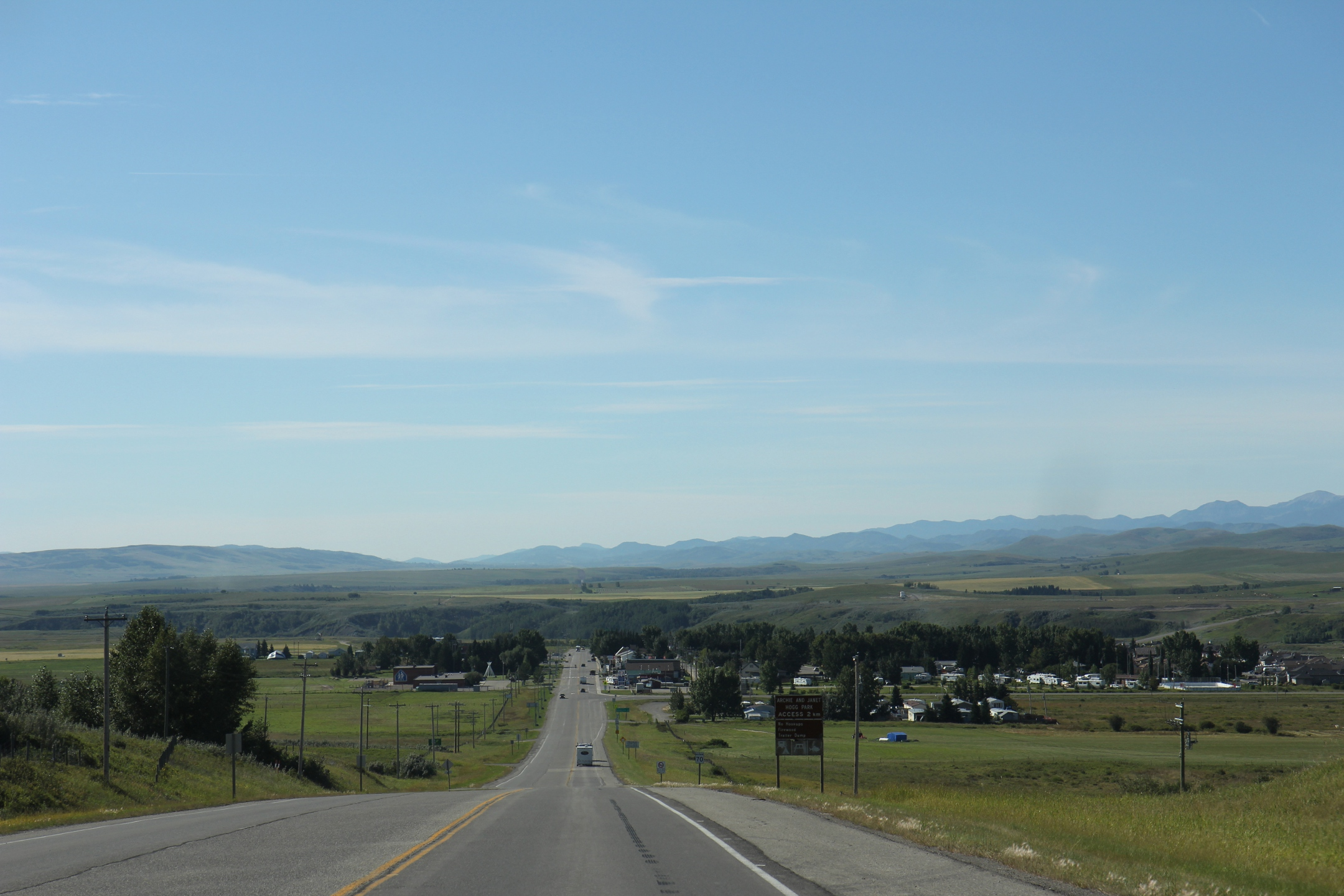
Panorama of Longview looking south on Highway 22

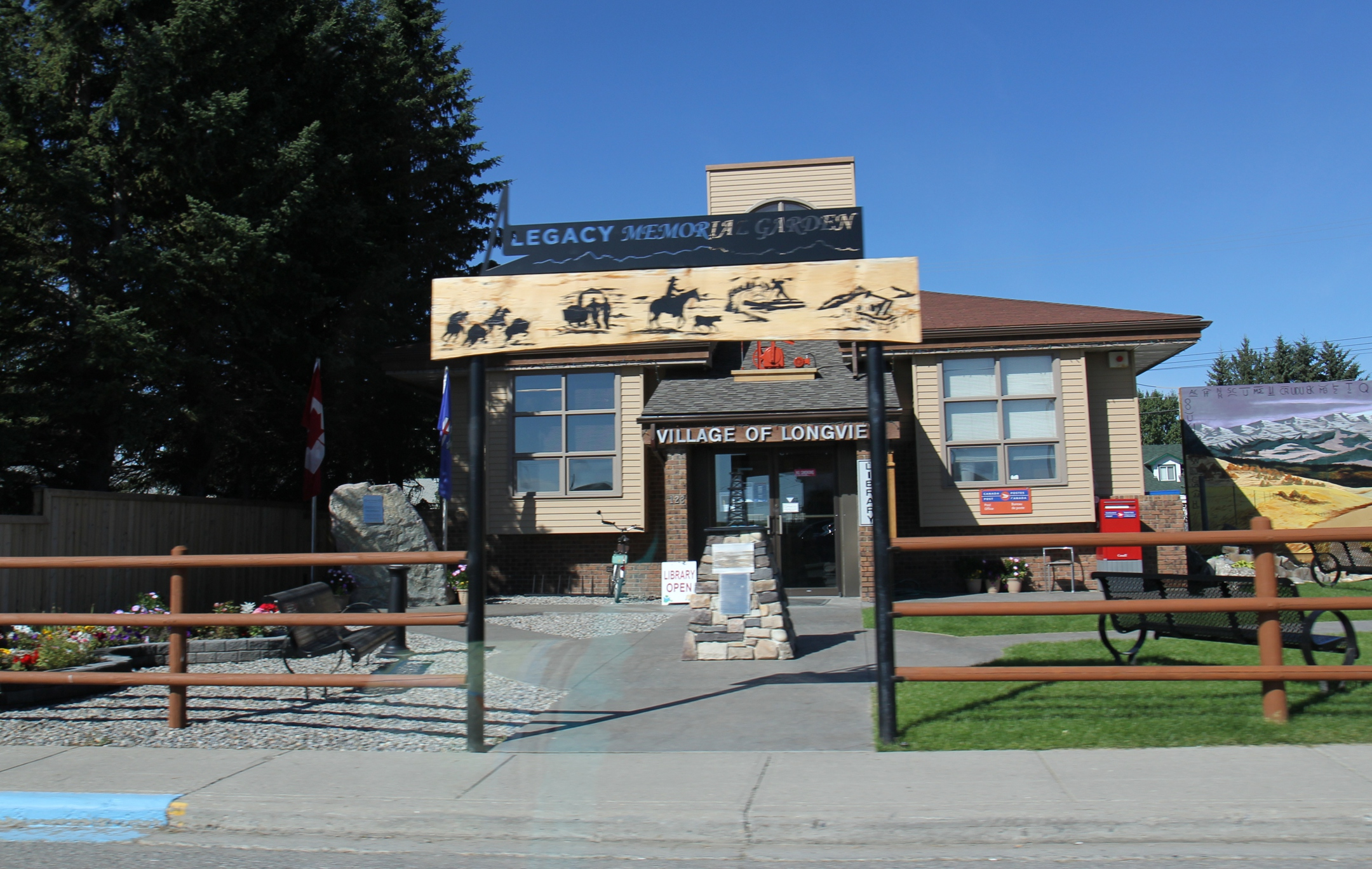
Post office and village hall

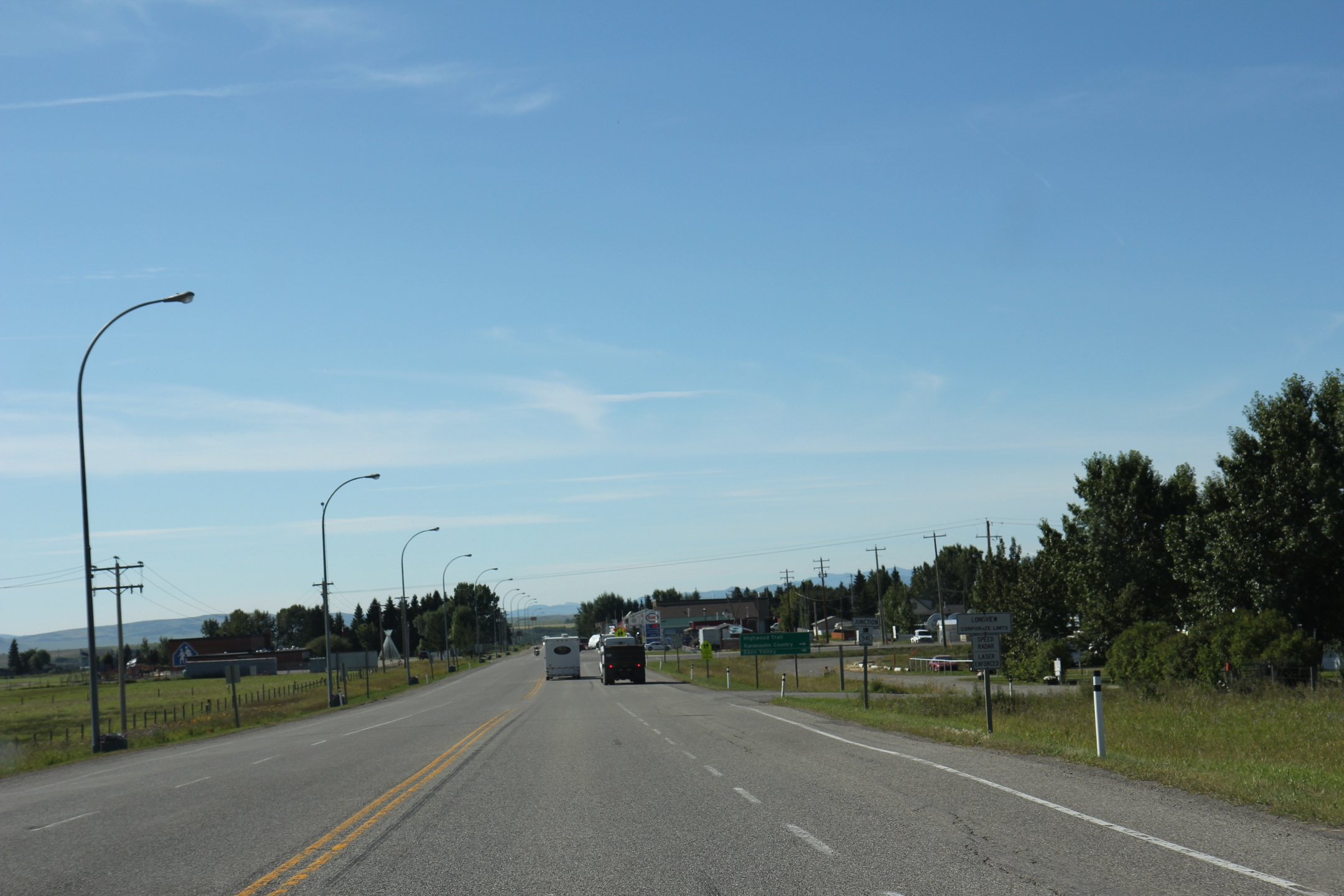
Looking south in Longview on Highway 22

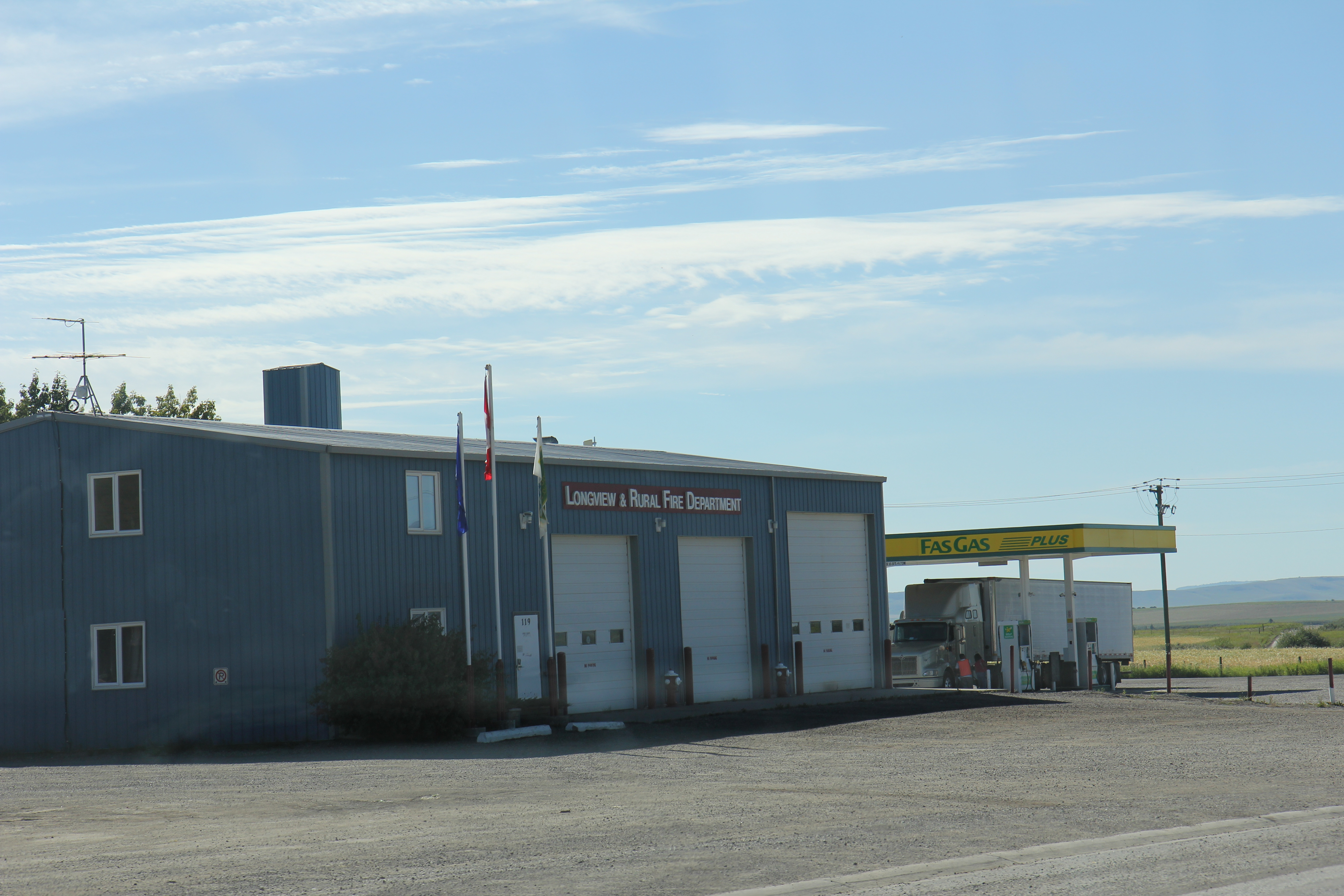
Longview and Rural Fire Department

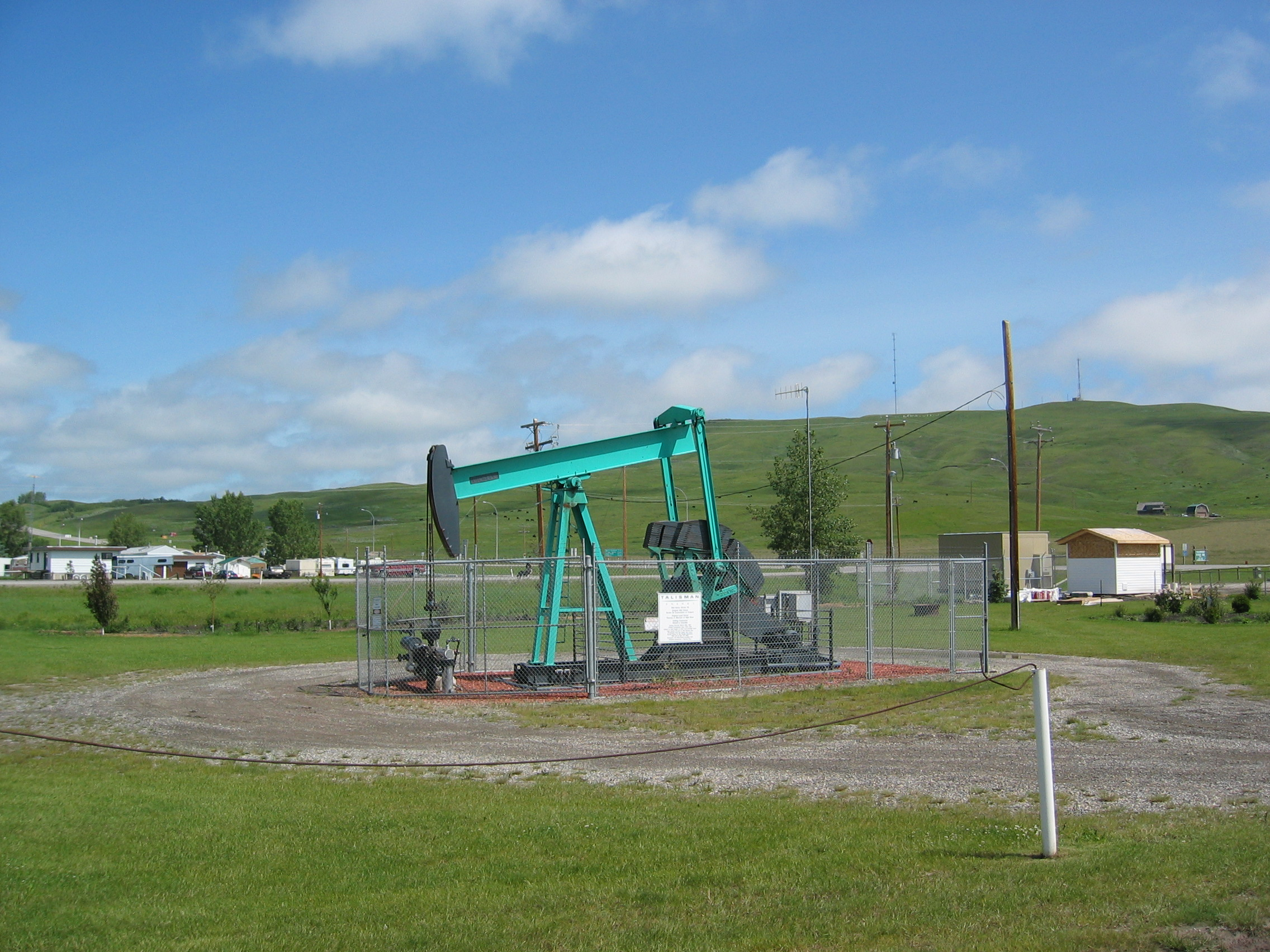
Talisman Energy Pumpjack in 2004

== See also ==
- List of communities in Alberta
- List of villages in Alberta
