= Municipal District of Ranchland No. 66 =

Municipal district in Alberta, Canada

- Municipal district
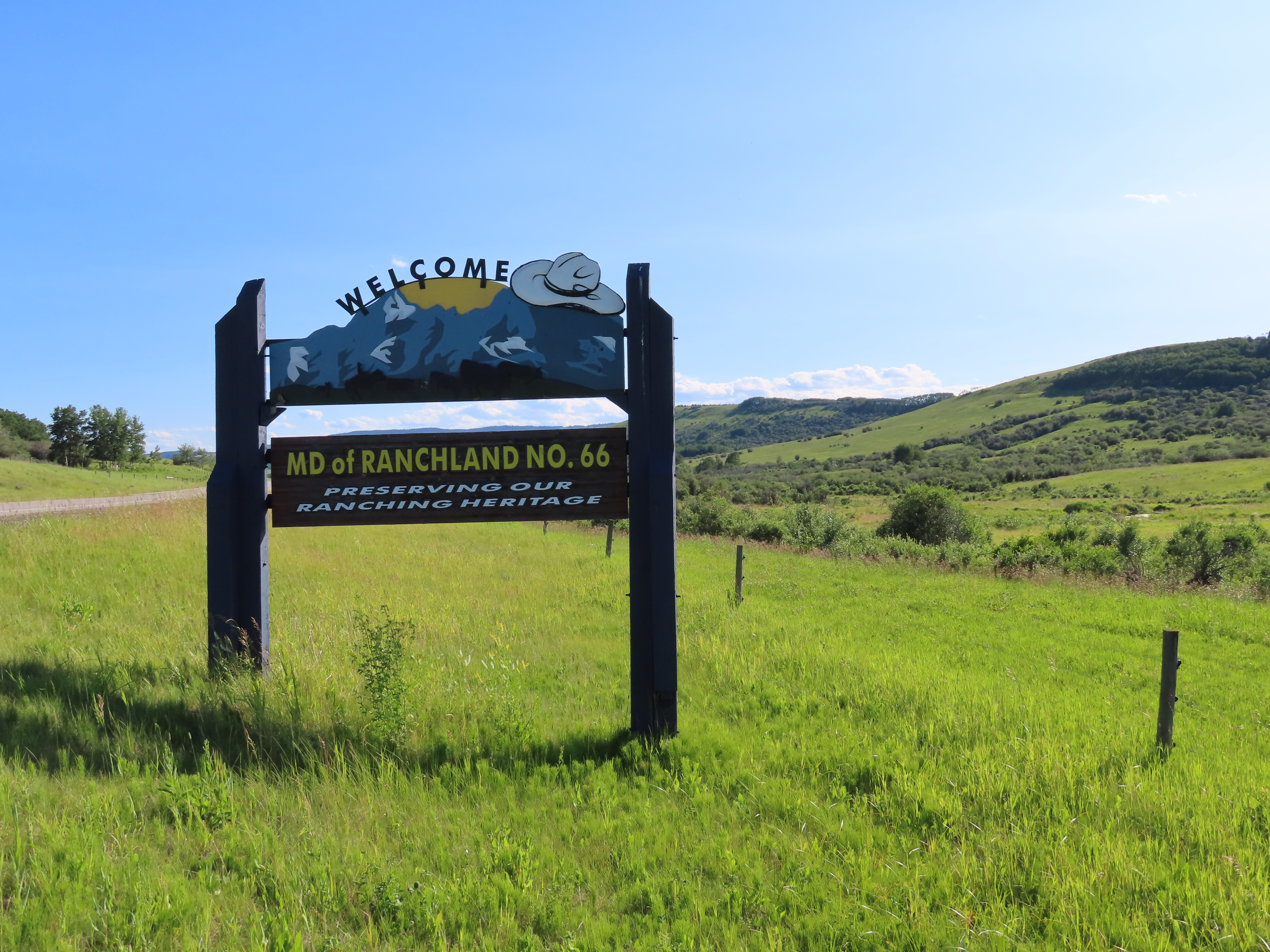
- Ranchland landscape with welcome sign

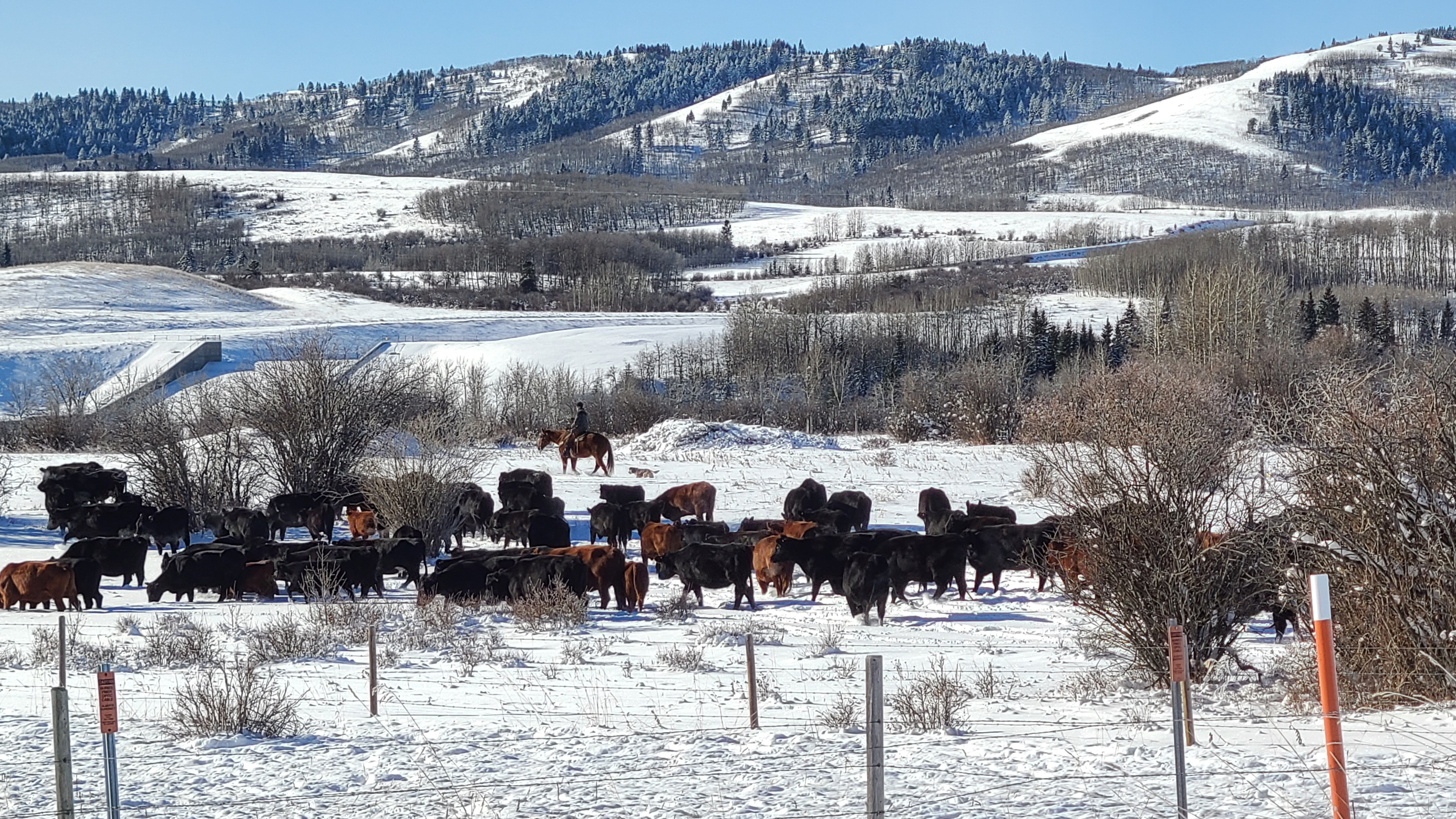
- Logo Ranchland resident moving cattle.
- Motto: "Preserving our ranching heritage."

- Location within Alberta
- Country: Canada
- Province: Alberta
- Region: Southern Alberta
- Planning region: South Saskatchewan
- Established: 1995
- Incorporated: 1995

Government
  - Reeve: Ron Davis
  - Governing body: MD of Ranchland Council
  - Administrative office: Chain Lakes Provincial Park

Area (2021)
  - Land: 2,636.75 km^{2} (1,018.05 sq mi)

Population (2021)
  - Total: 110
  - Density: 0/km^{2} (0/sq mi)
- Time zone: UTC−06:00 (Alberta Time)
- Website: mdranchland.ca

The Municipal District of Ranchland No. 66 is a municipal district (MD) in southwest Alberta, Canada. Containing no urban communities of any kind, its municipal office is in Chain Lakes Provincial Park, approximately 38 km (24 mi) southwest of the Town of Nanton. Ranchland's rugged foothill terrain is unsuited for the crop agriculture practised elsewhere in Alberta, and ranching remains the single livelihood of its inhabitants. With a 2016 population of 92, it is the least populated municipal district in Alberta, and its population density of 29 square kilometres for every resident is almost exactly equal to that of the Northwest Territories.

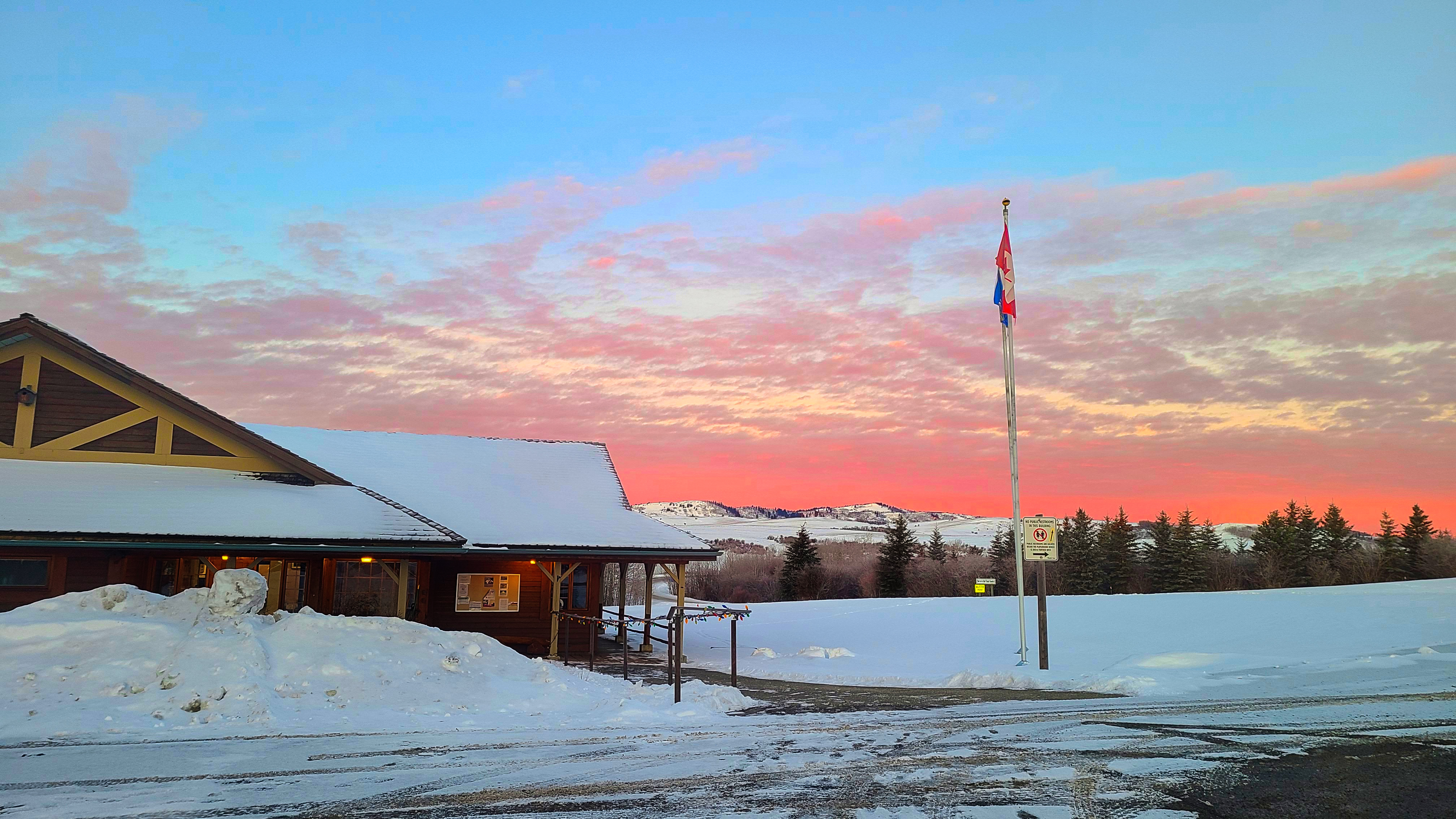
MD of Ranchland Administration building

== History ==
The MD was incorporated in 1995 from the Improvement District No. 6.

== Geography ==
Administration Building

The MD of Ranchland administration building is located at the junction of Highway 22 and Highway 533.

=== Communities ===
There are no communities located within the MD of Ranchland No. 66.

== Demographics ==
Federal census population history
Year	Pop.	±%
1971	133	—
1976	110	−17.3%
1981	119	+8.2%
1986	128	+7.6%
1991	130	+1.6%
1996	108	−16.9%
2001	96	−11.1%
2006	86	−10.4%
2011	79	−8.1%
2016	92	+16.5%
Source: Statistics Canada

In the 2021 Census of Population conducted by Statistics Canada, the MD of Ranchland No. 66 had a population of 110 living in 41 of its 55 total private dwellings, a change of 19.6% from its 2016 population of 92. With a land area of 2,636.75 km^{2} (1,018.05 sq mi), it had a population density of 0.0/km^{2} (0.1/sq mi) in 2021.

In the 2016 Census of Population conducted by Statistics Canada, the MD of Ranchland No. 66 had a population of 92 living in 38 of its 57 total private dwellings, a 16.5% change from its 2011 population of 79. With a land area of 2,638.7 km^{2} (1,018.8 sq mi), it had a population density of 0.0/km^{2} (0.1/sq mi) in 2016.

The MD of Ranchland No. 66's 2013 municipal census counted a population of 104.

== See also ==
- List of communities in Alberta
- List of municipal districts in Alberta
- Rural Municipality of Glen McPherson No. 46 - the least-populated rural-equivalent municipality in Canada, with 72 residents in 2016
