= Calgary Metropolitan Region =

- Metropolitan area
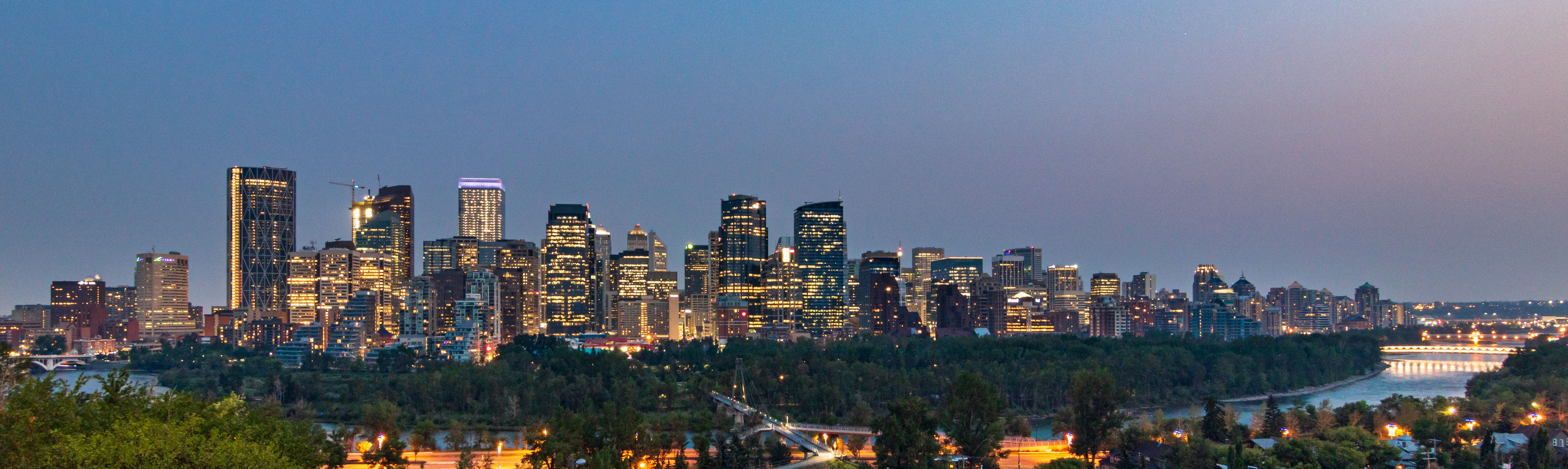
- Downtown Calgary skyline

- Member municipalities of the Calgary Metropolitan Region Board

- Location of the region in Alberta
- Coordinates: 51°0′N 114°0′W
- Country: Canada
- Province: Alberta

Area (2016)
  - CMA: 5,107.55 km^{2} (1,972.04 sq mi)

Population (2021)
  - Total: 1,481,806
  - Estimate (2025): 1,836,012
  - Rank: 4th in Canada
  - Density: 272.5/km^{2} (706/sq mi)

GDP
  - CMA: CDN$129 billion
- Time zone: UTC−06:00 (Alberta Time)
- Area codes: 403, 587, 825, 368

The Calgary Metropolitan Region (CMR), also known as Greater Calgary or Metro Calgary, is a conglomeration of municipalities centred on Calgary, the largest city in Alberta.

With the Government of Alberta's establishment of the Calgary Metropolitan Region Board (CMRB) in 2017, the CMR's boundaries were legislated to include the City of Calgary, Foothills County to the south, Rocky View County to the west, north, and east, and a western portion of Wheatland County further to the east. Also within these boundaries are the cities of Airdrie and Chestermere, seven towns: Cochrane, Crossfield, Diamond Valley, High River, Irricana, Okotoks, and Strathmore, two villages: Beiseker and Longview, and two First Nations communities: Tsuu T'ina 145 and Eden Valley 216. Not all of these, however, are administrative members of the CMRB.

The Calgary census metropolitan area (CMA) as delineated by Statistics Canada is smaller than the CMR. The Calgary CMA includes Calgary, Rocky View County, Airdrie, Beiseker, Chestermere, Cochrane, Crossfield, Irricana, and Tsuu T'ina 145.

The Calgary Metropolitan Region is a major transportation hub for southern AB, SK, southeastern BC, and parts of the northwestern United States such as Montana, Idaho, North Dakota, and Wyoming. It is home to the Calgary International Airport, the fourth busiest airport in Canada in terms of total aircraft movements and 35th busiest airport in Canada and the United States.

== Calgary CMA ==
The Calgary CMA, as defined by Statistics Canada, includes the following nine municipalities:

- three cities (Airdrie, Calgary and Chestermere);
- one municipal district (Rocky View County, which includes Langdon – the CMA's largest hamlet);
- three towns (Cochrane, Crossfield, and Irricana);
- one village (Beiseker); and
- one First Nations reserve (Tsuu T'ina Nation, which includes the Townsite of Redwood Meadows).

In the 2021 Census, the Calgary CMA had a population of 1,481,806 living in 531,062 of its 556,548 total dwellings, a 6.4% change from its 2016 population of 1,392,609 making it the largest CMA in Alberta and the fourth largest in Canada. With a land area of 5,107.55 km^{2} (1,972.04 sq mi), it had a population density of 290.1 people per square kilometre in 2021.

Also in terms of area, the Calgary CMA makes up approximately 40% of Statistics Canada's Division No. 6 in Alberta. The balance of Division No. 6 includes the census consolidated subdivisions of the MD of Foothills No. 31 to the south and Mountain View County to the north.

Foothills County and the municipalities within are often considered as part of Calgary's metropolitan area due to, among other things, the MDs shared boundary with the City of Calgary and the bedroom community nature of towns like Okotoks, High River, and Diamond Valley.

== Demographics ==
=== Ethnicity ===
Panethnic groups in Metro Calgary (2001−2021)
Panethnic group	2021		2016		2011		2006		2001	
Panethnic group	Pop.	%	Pop.	%	Pop.	%	Pop.	%	Pop.	%
European (Note: 2001-2016: Statistic includes all persons that did not make up part of a visible minority or an indigenous identity. 2021: Statistic includes all persons belonging to the non-indigenous and non-visible minority “White” population group.)	849,560	57.98%	869,555	63.26%	828,330	69.08%	805,825	75.29%	756,500	80.2%
South Asian	153,200	10.46%	122,900	8.94%	84,870	7.08%	57,700	5.39%	36,855	3.91%
Southeast Asian (Note: Statistic includes total responses of "Filipino" and "Southeast Asian" under visible minority section on census.)	117,445	8.02%	93,900	6.83%	71,245	5.94%	41,320	3.86%	28,940	3.07%
East Asian (Note: Statistic includes total responses of "Chinese", "Korean", and "Japanese" under visible minority section on census.)	112,825	7.7%	106,240	7.73%	89,345	7.45%	77,885	7.28%	59,585	6.32%
African	75,645	5.16%	54,190	3.94%	32,985	2.75%	21,060	1.97%	13,665	1.45%
Indigenous	48,625	3.32%	41,645	3.03%	33,370	2.78%	26,575	2.48%	21,915	2.32%
Middle Eastern (Note: Statistic includes total responses of "West Asian" and "Arab" under visible minority section on census.)	48,180	3.29%	39,130	2.85%	25,765	2.15%	17,670	1.65%	11,390	1.21%
Latin American	34,390	2.35%	27,710	2.02%	20,595	1.72%	13,410	1.25%	8,605	0.91%
Other/Multiracial (Note: Statistic includes total responses of "Visible minority, n.i.e." and "Multiple visible minorities" under visible minority section on census.)	26,265	1.79%	19,385	1.41%	12,620	1.05%	8,840	0.83%	5,865	0.62%
Total responses	1,465,180	98.88%	1,374,650	98.71%	1,199,125	98.71%	1,070,295	99.16%	943,310	99.15%
Total population	1,481,806	100%	1,392,609	100%	1,214,839	100%	1,079,310	100%	951,395	100%
Note: Totals greater than 100% due to multiple origin responses

=== Language ===
The question on knowledge of languages allows for multiple responses. The following figures are from the 2021 Canadian Census, and lists languages that were selected by at least 1,000 respondents.

Knowledge of languages in Metro Calgary
Language	2021	
Language	Pop.	%
English	1,430,255	97.62%
French	98,320	6.71%
Oromo	2,115	0.14%
Somali	2,430	0.17%
Amharic	8,450	0.58%
Arabic	34,975	2.39%
Hebrew	2,065	0.14%
Tigrigna	7,655	0.52%
Khmer (Cambodian)	1,255	0.09%
Vietnamese	19,290	1.32%
Bisaya, n.o.s.	1,115	0.08%
Cebuano	3,530	0.24%
Hiligaynon	1,365	0.09%
Ilocano	6,560	0.45%
Indonesian	1,250	0.09%
Pampangan (Kapampangan, Pampango)	1,145	0.08%
Tagalog	70,230	4.79%
Kannada	1,085	0.07%
Malayalam	3,850	0.26%
Tamil	4,425	0.3%
Telugu	2,425	0.17%
Albanian	1,865	0.13%
Bulgarian	1,015	0.07%
Czech	2,130	0.15%
Polish	9,110	0.62%
Russian	15,020	1.03%
Serbo-Croatian	6,600	0.45%
Slovak	1,440	0.1%
Ukrainian	4,620	0.32%
German	16,305	1.11%
Afrikaans	2,070	0.14%
Dutch	4,540	0.31%
Danish	1,075	0.07%
Greek	2,335	0.16%
Bengali	6,140	0.42%
Gujarati	11,115	0.76%
Hindi	44,965	3.07%
Kacchi	2,320	0.16%
Marathi	2,290	0.16%
Nepali	2,925	0.2%
Punjabi	68,240	4.66%
Sinhala	1,380	0.09%
Urdu	31,625	2.16%
Kurdish	1,420	0.1%
Dari	4,760	0.32%
Iranian; Persian	6,960	0.48%
Italian	9,510	0.65%
Portuguese	6,780	0.46%
Romanian	5,875	0.4%
Spanish	58,975	4.03%
Japanese	5,155	0.35%
Korean	12,225	0.83%
Akan (Twi)	1,395	0.1%
Igbo	3,030	0.21%
Swahili	3,405	0.23%
Yoruba	6,335	0.43%
Mandarin	46,240	3.16%
Min Nan (Chaochow, Teochow, Fukien, Taiwanese)	2,380	0.16%
Cantonese	42,805	2.92%
Thai	1,300	0.09%
Turkish	2,600	0.18%
Hungarian	3,665	0.25%
Total responses	1,465,175	98.88%
Total population	1,481,806	100%

== Calgary Metropolitan Region Board ==
The Calgary Metropolitan Region Board (CMRB) was legislated through the enactment of the CMRB Regulation in 2017, and was officially established on January 1, 2018. Municipalities that participate as members of the CMRB include the cities of Airdrie, Calgary, and Chestermere, the towns of Cochrane, Okotoks, High River and Strathmore, the MD of Foothills No. 31, Rocky View County, and Wheatland County.

== Calgary Regional Partnership ==
Founded in 1999, the Calgary Regional Partnership (CRP) is a cooperative between 15 urban municipalities in the greater Calgary area that deals with regional growth and planning issues. The CRP's motto is Thinking regionally... acting locally...

=== Membership ===
The CRP's current membership includes three cities (Airdrie, Calgary, and Chestermere), eight towns (Banff, Canmore, Cochrane, Diamond Valley, Irricana, Nanton, Okotoks, and Strathmore, and one townsite (Redwood Meadows). Of these thirteen municipalities, four of the ten towns (Banff, Canmore, Nanton, and Strathmore) are outside, but in proximity to, the Calgary Region's boundaries as defined in this article. Of the remaining six towns, two of them (Diamond Valley, and Okotoks) are outside the Calgary CMA boundaries as defined by Statistics Canada.

=== Past members ===
Membership in the CRP once consisted of the four municipal districts and two additional towns. These included the MD of Bighorn No. 8, the MD of Foothills No. 31, Rocky View County, Wheatland County and the towns of Crossfield and High River. The MD of Bighorn No. 8 pulled out of the CRP in March 2009 due to the lack of opportunity for infrastructure connectivity to the balance of the Calgary Region. In June 2009, the latter three opposed the Calgary Metropolitan Plan that was being considered for approval by the CRP's member municipalities. All three subsequently withdrew from the CRP in September 2009. Crossfield and High River withdrew from the CRP in December 2011 and April 2013 respectively citing concerns that the CRP was becoming another layer of government.

In an attempt to bring the MD of Foothills No. 31 and Rocky View County back to the CRP, Alberta's Minister of Municipal Affairs, Doug Griffiths, requested that the two municipal districts and the CRP engage in mediation. All parties agreed to participate and the mediation process has since concluded with a report delivered to Minister Griffiths for review and decision.

== List of municipalities ==
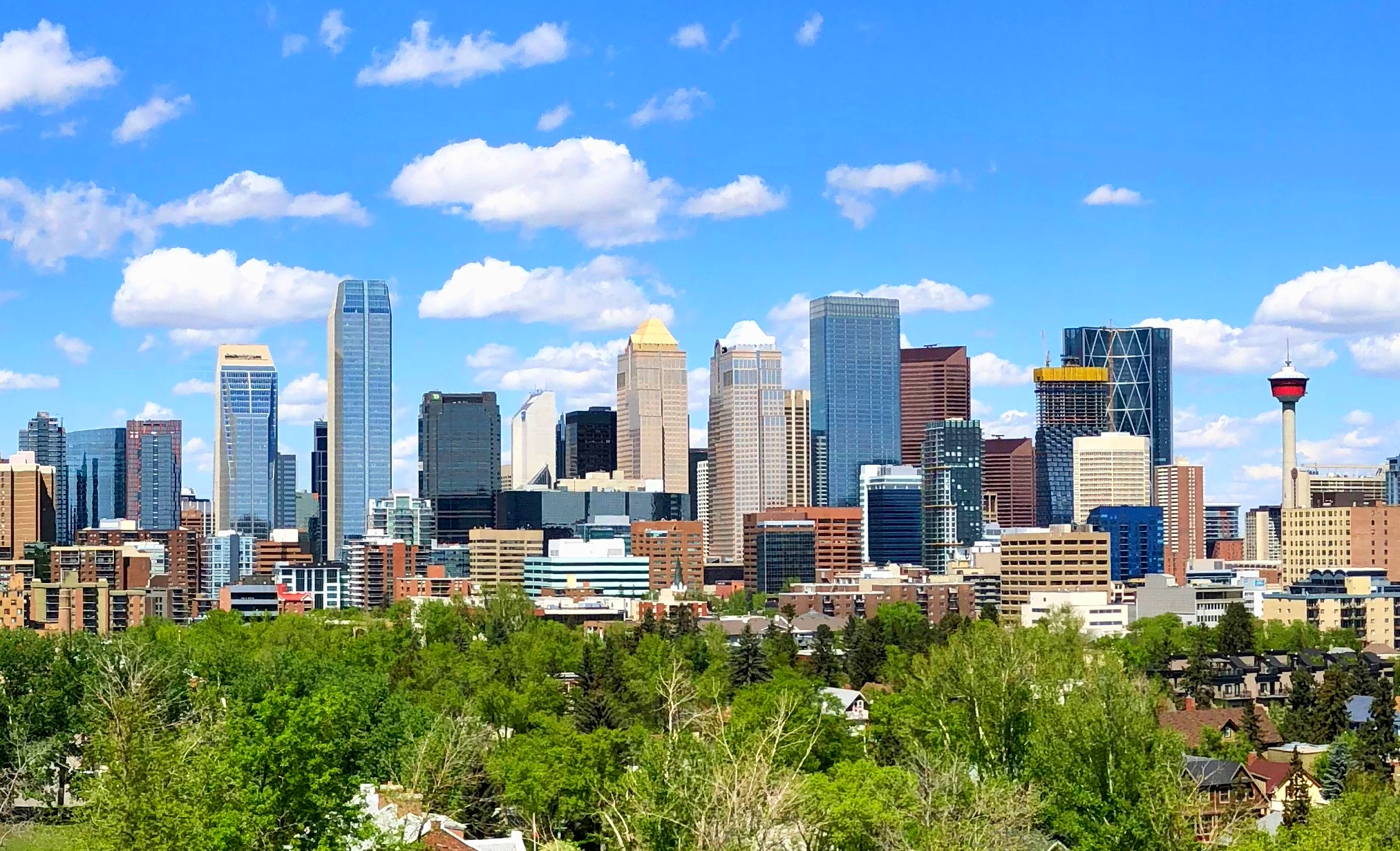
Calgary

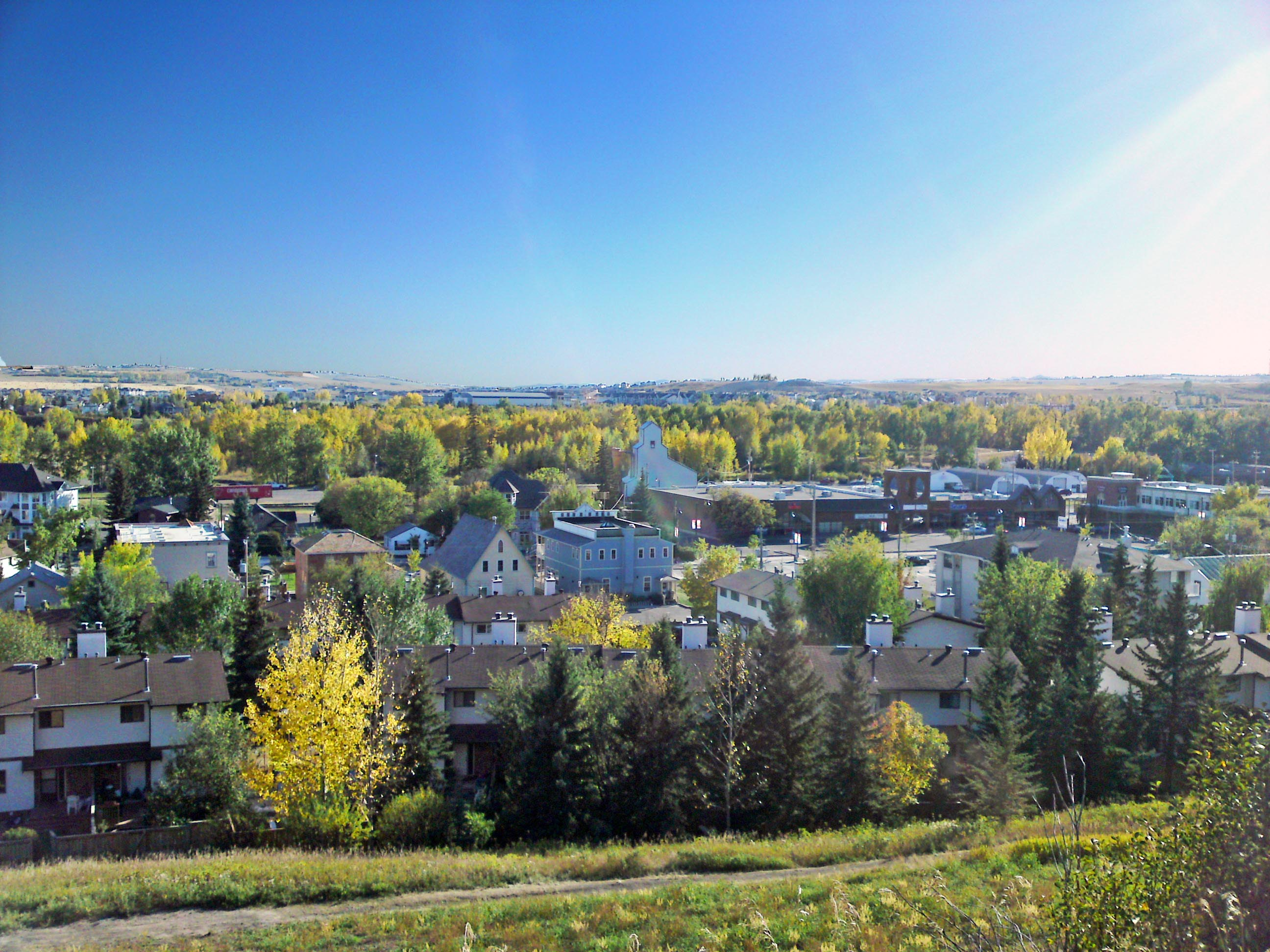
Okotoks

The following list provides the overlapping memberships or enumerations of municipalities in the greater Calgary area that are part of some, or all, of the designations: Calgary Metropolitan Region (CMR); Calgary census metropolitan area (CMA); or the Calgary Regional Partnership (CRP).

Municipality	Municipal status	Calgary CMA	CMR member	CRP member	Population (2021)	Population (2016)	Population (2011)	Population (2006)
Airdrie	City	Y	Y	Y	74,410	61,581	42,564	28,927
Banff	Town			Y	8,305	7,851		
Beiseker	Village	Y			828	819	785	804
Calgary	City	Y	Y	Y	1,306,784	1,239,220	1,096,833	988,193
Canmore	Town				15,990	13,992	12,228	12,039
Chestermere	City	Y	Y	Y	21,425	19,887	14,824	9,564
Cochrane	Town	Y	Y	Y	34,467	25,853	17,580	13,760
Crossfield	Town	Y		(Formally a member)	3,599	2,983	2,853	2,648
Diamond Valley	Town			Y	5,341			
Eden Valley 216	First Nations reserve				644	596	587	370
Foothills County	Municipal district		Y	(Formally a member)	23,199	22,766	21,258	19,736
High River	City		Y	(Formally a member)	14,324	13,584	12,920	10,716
Irricana	Town	Y		Y	1,179	1,216	1,162	1,243
Langdon	Hamlet		Y		5,497	5,305	4,211	2,595
Longview	Village				297	307	307	300
Nanton	Town			Y	2,167			
Okotoks	Town		Y	Y	30,405	28,881	24,511	17,145
Redwood Meadows	Town					1,053		
Rocky View County	Municipal district	Y	Y	(Formally a member)	41,028	39,407	36,461	34,171
Wheatland County	Municipal district		(Formally a member)	(Formally a member)	9,299	8,788	8,551	8,343
MD of Bighorn No. 8	Municipal district			(Formally a member)	1,598			
Strathmore	Town		(Formally a member)	Y	14,339	13,756	12,305	10,225
Tsuu T'ina Nation 145	First Nations reserve	Y			2,710	1,643	1,777	
Total Calgary CMA					1,487,303	1,397,914	1,219,050	1,081,905
Total Calgary Metropolitan Region					1,589,775	1,482,887	1,295,478	1,144,205

== See also ==
- Calgary
- Calgary-Edmonton Corridor
- Edmonton metropolitan region
- Census Metropolitan Area
- https://www.calgarymetroregion.ca/
