= Stan Kane =

- Born: Stanley Paris Rutherford Kane; 11 May 1929; Scotland
- Died: 2 September 2015 (aged 86); Toronto, Ontario, Canada
- Occupation(s): Actor, singer, painter
- Spouse: Judith Lebane Kane (1989–2015)

Stanley Paris Rutherford "Stan" Kane (11 May 1929 – 2 September 2015) was a Scottish actor, singer and painter who was best known for his role as the menacing villain Jim in David Winning's first feature film Storm.

Kane spent several years performing on the Canadian musical series The Pig and Whistle. He married Canadian singer and teacher and longtime companion Judith Lebane Kane on 5 November 1989. On 2 September 2015, he died in Toronto at the age of 86.

== Filmography ==
Year	Film	Role	Other notes
1970	The End of the Nancy J (or Le Nancy J ne pêchera plus)		
1983	Chautauqua Girl	Mr. Hosie	
1986	Mania (or Mania: The Intruder)	Paul Braden	TV, segment: "The Good Samaritan"
1987	Storm (or Turbulences)	Jim	
1988	Body of Evidence	Mace Victim	TV
