= William L. Campbell =

Canadian film editor (1947–2005)

William Lorne Campbell
- Born: September 5, 1947; Port Arthur, Ontario
- Died: February 9, 2005 (aged 57)
- Other name: Bill Campbell
- Education: Southern Alberta Institute of Technology; Mount Royal University
- Occupations: Film editor; Sound editor; President, Campbell Post Production Ltd.

William L. Campbell, also known professionally as Bill Campbell, (September 5, 1947–February 9, 2005) was a Canadian film editor who is best known for his work on David Winning's first feature film Storm.

He was also notable as one of the original founding members of the Calgary Society of Independent Filmmakers in 1976. He edited works for First Nations director Barbara Cranmer, as well as working with Cari Green and Nimpkish Wind Productions Inc.

Campbell attended the Southern Alberta Institute of Technology and Mount Royal University, and worked for Access Television before starting his own 16 mm film editing business, Campbell Post Production Ltd., in Calgary with his then-wife Dale.

== Filmography ==
Campbell has worked as both film and sound editor, in both television and film.

Filmography of Bill Campbell
| Year | Title | Film editor | Sound editor | Notes | Ref. |
|---|---|---|---|---|---|
| 1973 | Here, There, and Everywhere | Yes | No | TV series; 30 episodes | |
| 1973 | The Victorian Age | Yes | No | TV series; 3 episodes | |
| 1977 | In Pursuit Of... | Yes | Yes | Short film | |
| 1977 | Ready for the Street | Yes | Yes | Short film | |
| 1979 | Sequence | Yes | No | Short film | |
| 1980 | I'm Just an Ordinary Me – The Story of the Alberta Games | Yes | No | Short film | |
| 1980 | The Role of the Police | Yes | No | Short film | |
| 1982 | Lady in Motion: A Film Portrait of Agnes Hammond and Friends | Yes | Yes | Short film | |
| 1983 | Payday | Yes | No | Short film | |
| 1987 | Storm (French: Turbulances) | | | | |
| 1988 | Bombs Away | | | | |
| 1995 | Laxwesa Wa: Strength of the River | | | | |
| 1997 | Qatuwas: People Gathering Together | | | | |
| 1999 | T'Lina: The Rendering of Wealth | | | | |
