= Elbow Falls =

Waterfall on the Elbow River in Alberta, Canada

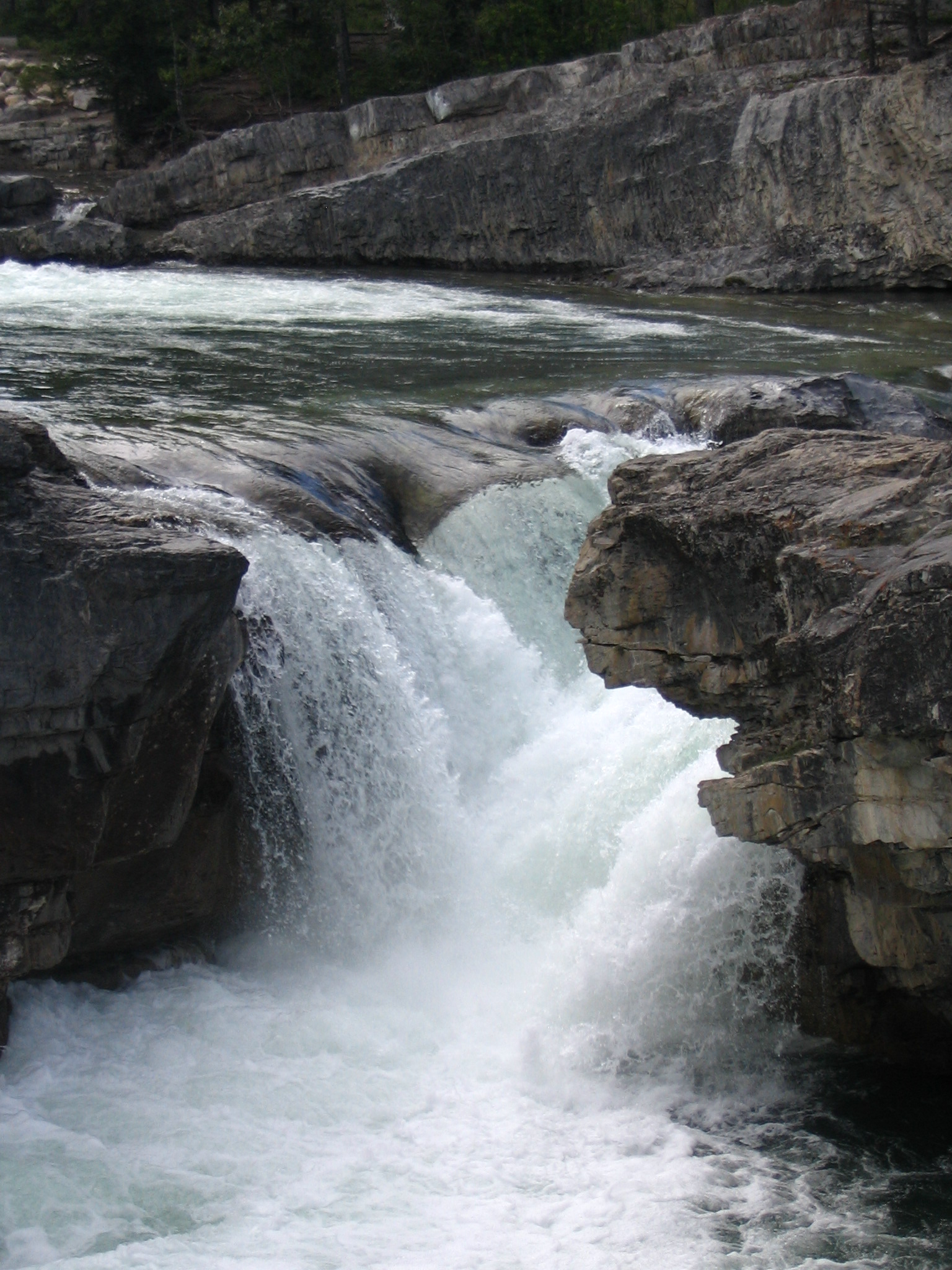

- Location within Alberta
- Location: Kananaskis Improvement District, Alberta
- Coordinates: 50°52′4″N 114°46′44″W
- Total height: 3 m (9.8 ft)
- Watercourse: Elbow River

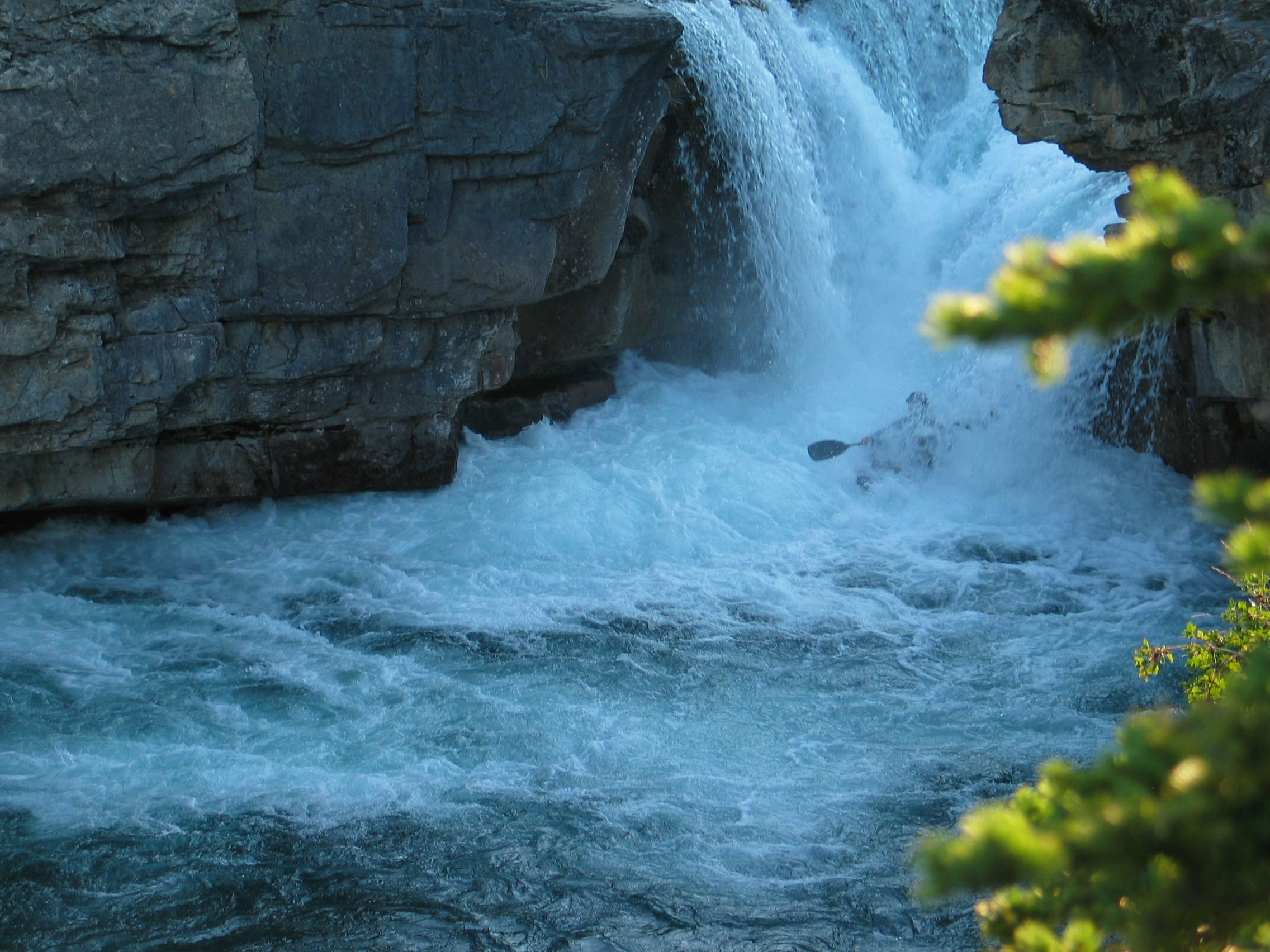
Elbow Falls is popular with kayakers

Elbow Falls is a small set of waterfalls along the Elbow River, west of the hamlet of Bragg Creek within Kananaskis Improvement District, Alberta. They are located along Highway 66, 20 km (12 mi) west of the Bragg Creek turnoff on Highway 22.

In the dry season, the falls reach a height of six metres (20 ft), while in June, during high discharges, the river fills up and the waterfall is only three metres (9.8 ft) high.

A day use area (i.e. picnics) is maintained at the falls site, and also serves as the start/finish of a short one kilometre (0.62 mi) long hiking trail. Overnight camping is available at several nearby campgrounds.

After the 2013 Alberta floods, the day use area was destroyed. The Elbow River overflowed its banks and destroyed all of the picnicking area and most of the paved trails. The riverbed itself also suffered major destruction, now being replaced by mounds of rock, rather than soil and trees.

Was used in the climatic scene of the 1992 thriler movie Killer Image . Actor Michael Ironside falls to his death here at the end of the film. Shot in October 1990.

== See also ==
- List of waterfalls
- List of waterfalls in Canada
