= Bragg Creek Provincial Park =

Provincial park in Alberta, Canada

- Location within Alberta
- Interactive map of Bragg Creek Provincial Park
- Location: Rocky View County, Alberta
- Nearest city: Bragg Creek
- Coordinates: 50°56′21″N 114°35′00″W
- Established: January 19, 1960
- Governing body: Alberta Tourism, Parks and Recreation

Bragg Creek Provincial Park is a Canadian provincial park in Alberta's Rocky Mountains at the eastern edge of Kananaskis Country. This park is located near the Elbow River and includes facilities for picnicking, hiking, and fishing. It is day-use only.

CBC's television series North of 60 featured this provincial park as part of its principal filming photography.

This park lies at the intersection of Cowboy Trail and Highway 66, south of Bragg Creek in Rocky View County.

== See also ==
- List of provincial parks in Alberta
- List of Canadian provincial parks
- List of National Parks of Canada
