= Bragg Creek =

- Hamlet
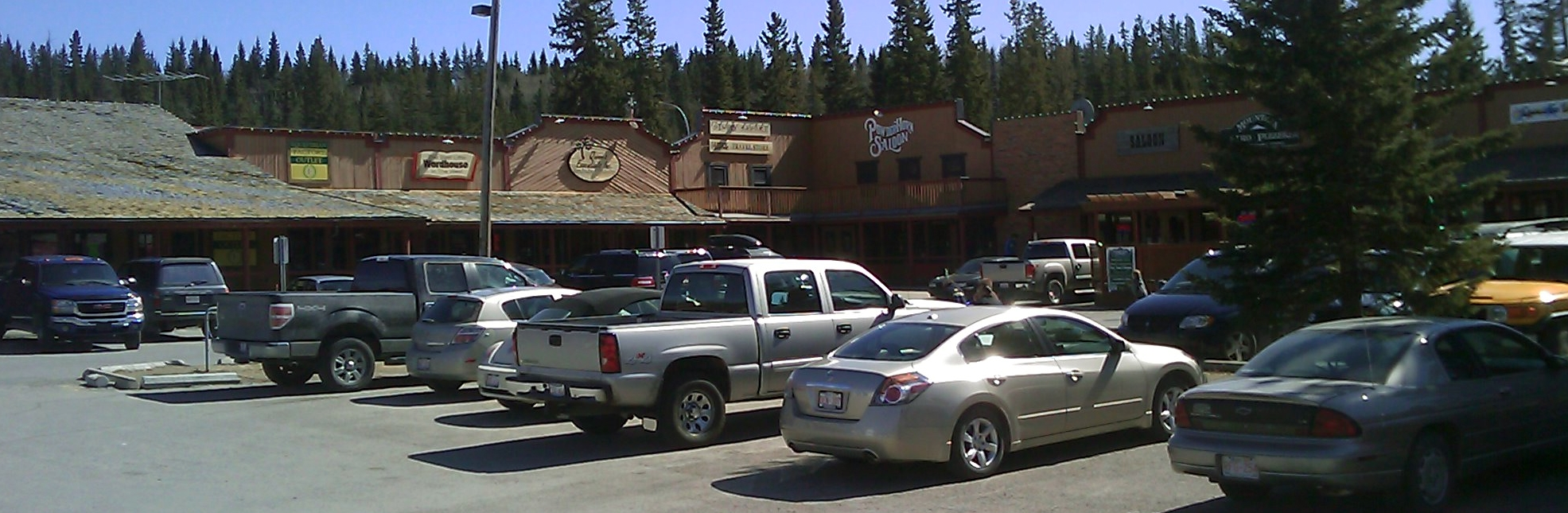
- Shopping mall in Bragg Creek

- Location of Bragg Creek in Alberta
- Coordinates: 50.95159°N 114.55951°W
- Country: Canada
- Province: Alberta
- Census division: No. 6
- Municipal district: Rocky View County

Government
  - Type: Unincorporated
  - Reeve: Greg Boehlke
  - Governing body: Rocky View County Council: Jerry Arshinoff; Rolly Ashdown; Margaret Bahcheli; Greg Boehlke; Liz Breakey; Lois Habberfield; Bruce Kendall; Eric Lowther; Earl Solberg

Area (2021)
  - Land: 1.55 km^{2} (0.60 sq mi)

Population (2021)
  - Total: 432
  - Density: 278.3/km^{2} (721/sq mi)
- Time zone: UTC−06:00 (Alberta Time)
- Area code: +1-403

Bragg Creek is a hamlet in southern Alberta, Canada, under the jurisdiction of Rocky View County, in Division No. 6.

It is located 30 km (19 mi) west of Calgary (via Highway 8 and Highway 22) at the confluence of the Elbow River and Bragg Creek, north of the intersection of Highway 66 and Highway 22.

The hamlet has served as the filming location for several movies and TV series.

== Amenities ==
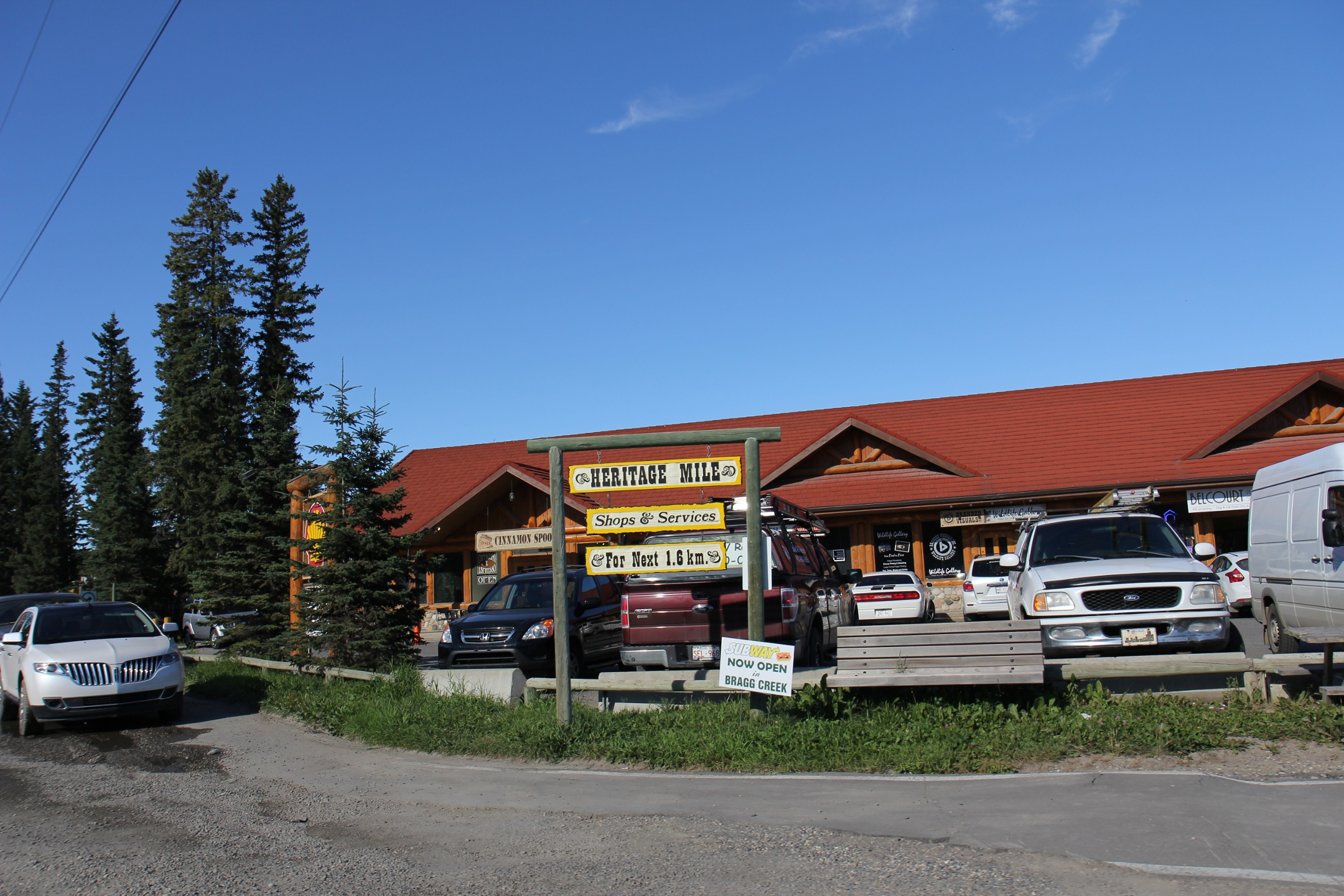
Strip mall in Bragg Creek

Bragg Creek is popular for shopping, restaurants, and mountain scenery.

The area is a popular spot for vacations and short day trips from Calgary. It is near the Rocky Mountains and Kananaskis Country. The Elbow River and the scenic Elbow Falls are a short distance away.

There are many recreational areas in the area. These include Bragg Creek Provincial Park and the Canyon Creek Ice Cave, also known as the Bragg Creek Ice Cave. There are numerous hiking/biking trails, equestrian trails and picnic/camping areas. Downhill skiing used to be popular, although since the abandonment of the nearby downhill ski centre, Wintergeen, only cross country skiing facilities are available. In recent years the Greater Bragg Creek Trails Association has developed over 140 km (87 mi) of biking, hiking, snowshoeing, and horseback riding trails.

Many summer camps, such as OLQP, Easter Seals Camp Horizon and Kamp Kiwanis are also near Bragg Creek.

The powderface42, a marathon and half-marathon takes place in the vicinity every year. A mountain marathon is an event that combines the distance and endurance of a classical marathon with the challenging terrain of a mountain race. Unlike traditional mountain marathons in the UK, this event does not require participants to navigate through the course. Instead, the route is clearly marked and there are water stations along the way. It is similar to a traditional marathon running race in that respect.

== History ==
Bragg Creek is named after Albert Warren Bragg from Collingwood, Nova Scotia and his 14-year-old brother John Thomas who homesteaded in the area in 1894. The community was established between a forestry reserve, the Tsuut'ina First Nations reserve and a provincial park. Ranching was the original primary economic generator in Bragg Creek. The economy diversified with the emergence of recreation in the 1920s.

In 1933, Mary Belle and Catherine Barclay, two sisters from Alberta, established the first hostel in a tent in Bragg Creek, just west of Calgary. Together they officially founded and then registered the Canadian Youth Hostel Association in 1938 (now HI Canada).

Wintergreen Ski Area, also known as Lyon Mountain Ski Hill, located outside of Bragg Creek, opened in 1982 and was named after its builder, Bob Lyon. The resort featured four lifts and 11 runs, most of which were classified as easy or intermediate in difficulty. It was popular with families due to its close proximity to Calgary. In 2003, the resort was closed by its owner at the time, Resorts of the Canadian Rockies (RCR). This decision was made due to a combination of factors, including poor snow conditions, aging infrastructure, and a lack of potential for reinvestment. RCR continues to operate the adjacent Wintergreen Golf and Country Club. Over time, most of the ski lifts at Lyon Mountain Ski Hill have been removed and sold. RCR has proposed a large housing development for the area, including single-family homes, villas, and a hotel.

Bragg Creek has served as the filming location for such productions as Storm (1987) and Killer Image (1992), both directed by David Winning. The long-running television series North of 60 was primarily filmed in Bragg Creek. The town was also the filming location for the BBC series Dinosapien (2007) and the 2009 CBC series Wild Roses.

=== 2013 flooding ===
In the late spring of 2013, Bragg Creek and areas surrounding the Elbow River were put on a flood watch and eventually voluntary evacuation when the river rose over 2 metres (6 ft 7 in), overflowing and eroding in some places. The majority of Bragg Creek buildings were damaged in this event, as were the majority of houses in nearby Redwood Meadows. The voluntary evacuation was not met with widespread co-operation, as many residents stayed to battle the flood by building makeshift dams. Bragg Creek has since recovered from the event.

== Demographics ==
Population history of Bragg Creek
Year	Pop.	±%
1941	26	—
1951	80	+207.7%
1956	35	−56.2%
1961	77	+120.0%
1966	83	+7.8%
1971	203	+144.6%
1976	384	+89.2%
1981	505	+31.5%
1986	498	−1.4%
1991	591	+18.7%
1991A	596	+0.8%
1996	651	+9.2%
2001	678	+4.1%
2006	550	−18.9%
2011	595	+8.2%
2016	589	−1.0%
2016R	418	−29.0%
2021	432	+3.3%
Source: Statistics Canada

In the 2021 Census of Population conducted by Statistics Canada, Bragg Creek had a population of 432 living in 189 of its 213 total private dwellings, a change of 3.3% from its 2016 population of 418. With a land area of 1.55 km^{2} (0.60 sq mi), it had a population density of 278.7/km^{2} (721.9/sq mi) in 2021.

The population of Bragg Creek according to the 2018 municipal census conducted by Rocky View County is 459.

== See also ==
- List of communities in Alberta
- List of designated places in Alberta
- List of hamlets in Alberta
