= Elbow pass =

Elbow pass may refer to:

- Elbow Pass, the mountain pass between the Highwood and Elbow areas in Kananaskis Country, Alberta, Canada
- Elbow pass (basketball), one of the most difficult trick passes to execute
