= Lawrence Elion =

Lawrence Elion (November 5, 1917 – March 27, 2011) was a Canadian–British actor who was best known for his role as the hapless first victim Stanley in David Winning's debut feature film Storm.

Lawrence was born in Brentford, Chiswick, England. He served in the Signal Corps of the British Army during World War II. Lawrence had a passion for piano and theatre, was a member of ACTRA and won numerous awards for 'Best Actor'.

His wife Isabel lives in Calgary, Alberta.

== Selected filmography as actor ==
- Storm (1987) .... Stanley

... aka Turbulences (Canada: French title)

- I Miss You, Hugs and Kisses (1978) (TV) .... Alliston
- Recommendation for Mercy (1975) .... Actor
