= Tim Hollings =

Canadian cinematographer

Tim Hollings (December 27, 1951 – September 17, 2006) was a Canadian cinematographer and news cameraman who is best known for his work on David Winning's first feature film Storm.

He was also notable as one of the founding news cameramen for several decades at CFCN-TV Television, the CTV affiliate in Calgary.

He was the president of Manda Film Productions, producing commercials throughout western Canada.

His wife Jennie and two children live in Calgary, Alberta.

== Filmography as Cinematographer ==
1. Storm (1987) ... aka Turbulences (Canada: French title)
2. Storm: In The Making (1987) … self
