= Canyon Creek Ice Cave =

Cave in Alberta, Canada

Coordinates: 52.138546°N 117.193222°W

Canyon Creek Ice Cave, also known as Bragg Creek Ice Cave or Moose Mountain Ice Cave, is a small ice cave in limestone located in Kananaskis Country near the community of Bragg Creek, Alberta, Canada. Known to natives through prehistory, its 'discovery' is attributed to Stan Fullerton in 1905. Only twenty minutes west of the City of Calgary, Canyon Creek Ice Cave is a popular outing for visitors of all ages and experience. From the parking lot, the cave is visible as a tall black scar about three-quarters of the way up the mountain. It doesn't seem very distant, but the round trip, including a few minutes in the cold and dark, takes about 4 hours.

In recent years, the influx of visitors who were ill-prepared for a caving expedition resulted in the permanent closure of the road to the parking lot. There is now a new parking lot just off Highway 66, and then a 7 km hike along the old road to get to the former parking area. This has lengthened the trip from the old 4 hour trek to a more challenging 6 hour hike for experienced hikers and 8 hours for inexperienced hikers.

Since the closure of the road, the number of accidents on the way to, or inside of, the ice caves has reduced dramatically. Most hikers are now serious about experiencing the cave and now bring appropriate gear, including helmets, headlamps, food and water, and other safety equipment.

The cave was formed primarily by water enlarging fractures within the slightly soluble limestone, with its entrance considerably enlarged by large-scale frost wedging during freeze-thaw cycles, similar to the phreatic or vadose caves often found in Canada. Much of the cave has subsequently been sealed off by permanent ice, and during the winter months beautiful ice formations are sometimes seen near the entrance. The cave has large amounts of loose rock, and care should be taken when hiking to cave, as the approach slopes were the site of a fatality due to rockfall from careless hikers.

The cave has been subject to considerable vandalism and damage in its history, with spray paint markings and garbage left behind. Visitors should respect cave formations, and leave no garbage or human waste inside the cave.
