= Alberta Highway 66 =

Highway in Alberta, Canada

Highway 66
- Highway 66 highlighted in red

Route information
- Maintained by the Ministry of Transportation and Economic Corridors
- Length: 27.5 km (17.1 mi)

Major junctions
- West end: Little Elbow Recreation Area
- East end: Highway 22 south of Bragg Creek

Location
- Country: Canada
- Province: Alberta
- Specialized and rural municipalities: Kananaskis I.D., Foothills County, Rocky View County

Highway system
- Alberta Numbered Highway Network; List; Former
← Highway 64	→ Highway 68

Alberta Provincial Highway No. 66, commonly referred to as Highway 66, is an east–west highway in central Alberta, Canada. In the east, Highway 66 begins at an intersection with Highways 22 and 762 south of the Hamlet of Bragg Creek and ends 28 kilometres (17 mi) to the west at the Little Elbow Recreation Area. The highway provides access to the Easter Seals Camp Horizon and Elbow Falls.

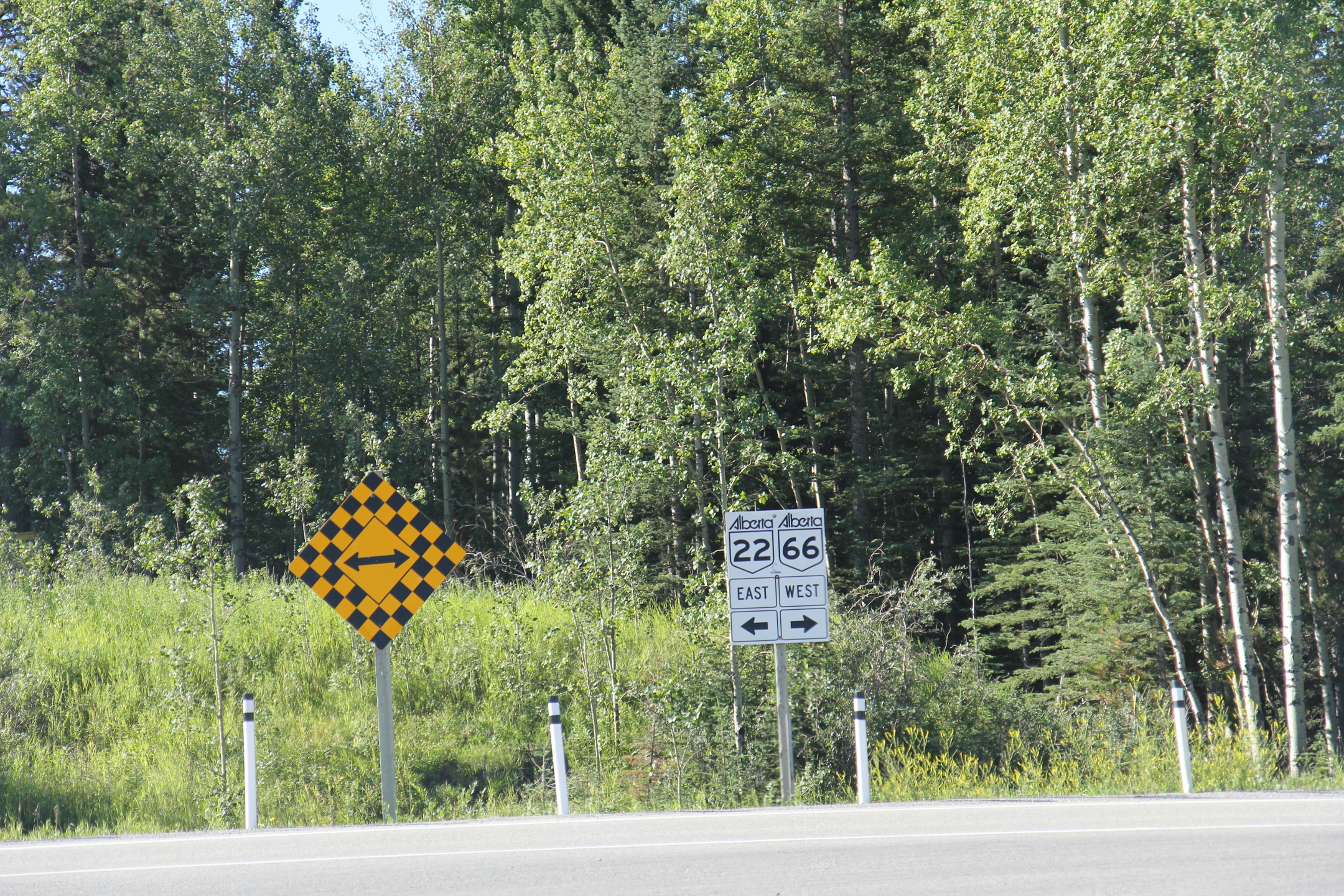
East terminus of Highway 66 at Highway 22 near Bragg Creek

Between December 1 and around mid-May, the western terminus of Highway 66 is located at the Elbow Falls turnoff. During this time, the length of the highway is shortened to 17 km (11 mi)

== Major intersections ==
From west to east:

Location	km	mi	Destinations	Notes
Kananaskis I.D. (Kananaskis Country)	0.0	0.0	Powderface Trail / Little Elbow Recreation Area	Highway 66 western terminus; closed between December 1 and mid-May
Kananaskis I.D. (Kananaskis Country)	9.0	5.6	Winter closure gate	
Kananaskis I.D. (Kananaskis Country)	9.0	5.6	Elbow Falls	
Kananaskis I.D. (Kananaskis Country)	18.2	11.3	Crosses Elbow River	
Foothills County	No major junctions			
Rocky View County–Foothills County boundary	25.9	16.1	Highway 758 north – Bragg Creek Provincial Park, Bragg Creek	
Rocky View County–Foothills County boundary	27.5	17.1	Highway 22 to Highway 1 (TCH) / Highway 2 – Bragg Creek, Cochrane, Calgary, Diamond Valley	Highway 66 eastern terminus; continues as Highway 22 south
Rocky View County–Foothills County boundary	27.8	17.3	Highway 762 south – Brown-Lowery Provincial Park	
1.000 mi = 1.609 km; 1.000 km = 0.621 mi: Closed/former; Route transition
