= Exception to the Rule =

1997 Canadian-German film by David Winning

- VHS cover
- Directed by: David Winning
- Written by: Shell Danielson; Shuki Levy
- Produced by: James Shavick; Jeff Sackman
- Starring: Kim Cattrall; Eric McCormack; Sean Young; William Devane
- Cinematography: John Houtman
- Edited by: Michael John Bateman
- Music by: Richard Bronskill
- Production company: Frankfurter Filmproduktion GmbH
- Distributed by: Artisan Entertainment; Lions Gate Films
- Release date: 5 April 1997
- Running time: 98 minutes
- Countries: Canada; Germany
- Language: English

Exception to the Rule is a 1997 Canadian-German erotic thriller film directed by David Winning and stars Kim Cattrall, Eric McCormack, Sean Young and William Devane.

== Plot ==
A married jewel trader is seduced by a beautiful woman while on a business trip. Upon returning home, he receives a video tape in the mail of his tryst and a threat to ruin his marriage if he doesn't turn a shipment of diamonds over to the woman.

== Cast ==
- Sean Young as Angela Bayer
- Kim Cattrall as Carla Rainer
- Eric McCormack as Timothy Bayer
- William Devane as Lawrence Kellerman
- Diego Wallraff as Detective Garcia
- Stephen Mendel as Dr. Harold Beeson
- Bob Lujan as Ron Lansing
- Mark Acheson as Burt Ramsey
- Rob Daprocida as Bruno
- Michael Cram as Paramedic
- Ernie Prentice as Old Man
- Bethoe Shirkoff as Old Woman
- Donald Adams as Sam Jorgenson
- Terri Lo as Porn Star #1
- J.J. McGowan as Porn Star #2
- Robyn Palmer as Receptionist
- Gerard Plunkett as Diamond Merchant
- David Fredericks as Ferguson
- Heather Hanson as Woman in Strip Club
- Adrienne Arsenault as Newscaster
- Ellie Harvie as Secretary
- Marc Akerstream as Hooded Killer
- Cody as Barney the Dog

== Release ==
It premiered in Japan on April 5, 1997 and in the US as part of the 1997 Houston Film Festival The feature was released on VHS by Artisan Entertainment on June 15, 1999.

== Reception ==
Joe Leydon, of Variety, said there's a certain novelty to seeing Young cast against type and Cattrall is good for a few laughs as she throws herself into her devious character with lip-smacking, dirty-mouthed relish.
