= Elbow Lake (Alberta) =

Lake in Alberta, Canada

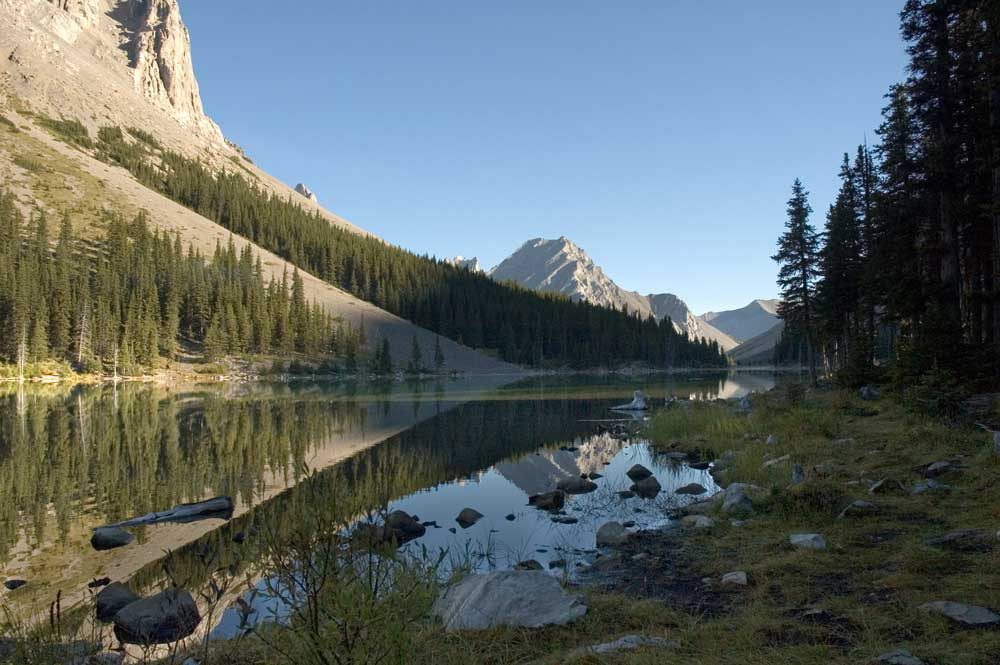

- Location within Alberta
- Location: Kananaskis, Alberta
- Coordinates: 50°38′23″N 115°00′26″W
- Primary outflows: Elbow River
- Basin countries: Canada
- Max. length: 0.5 km (0.31 mi)
- Max. width: 0.2 km (0.12 mi)
- Surface area: 0.5 km^{2} (0.19 sq mi)
- Surface elevation: 2,120 m (6,960 ft)

Elbow Lake is a lake located in the Elbow Pass north of the Highwood pass in Kananaskis Country in Alberta, Canada. Elbow Lake lies at an elevation of 2,120 m (6,960 ft) and is the headwater of the Elbow River.

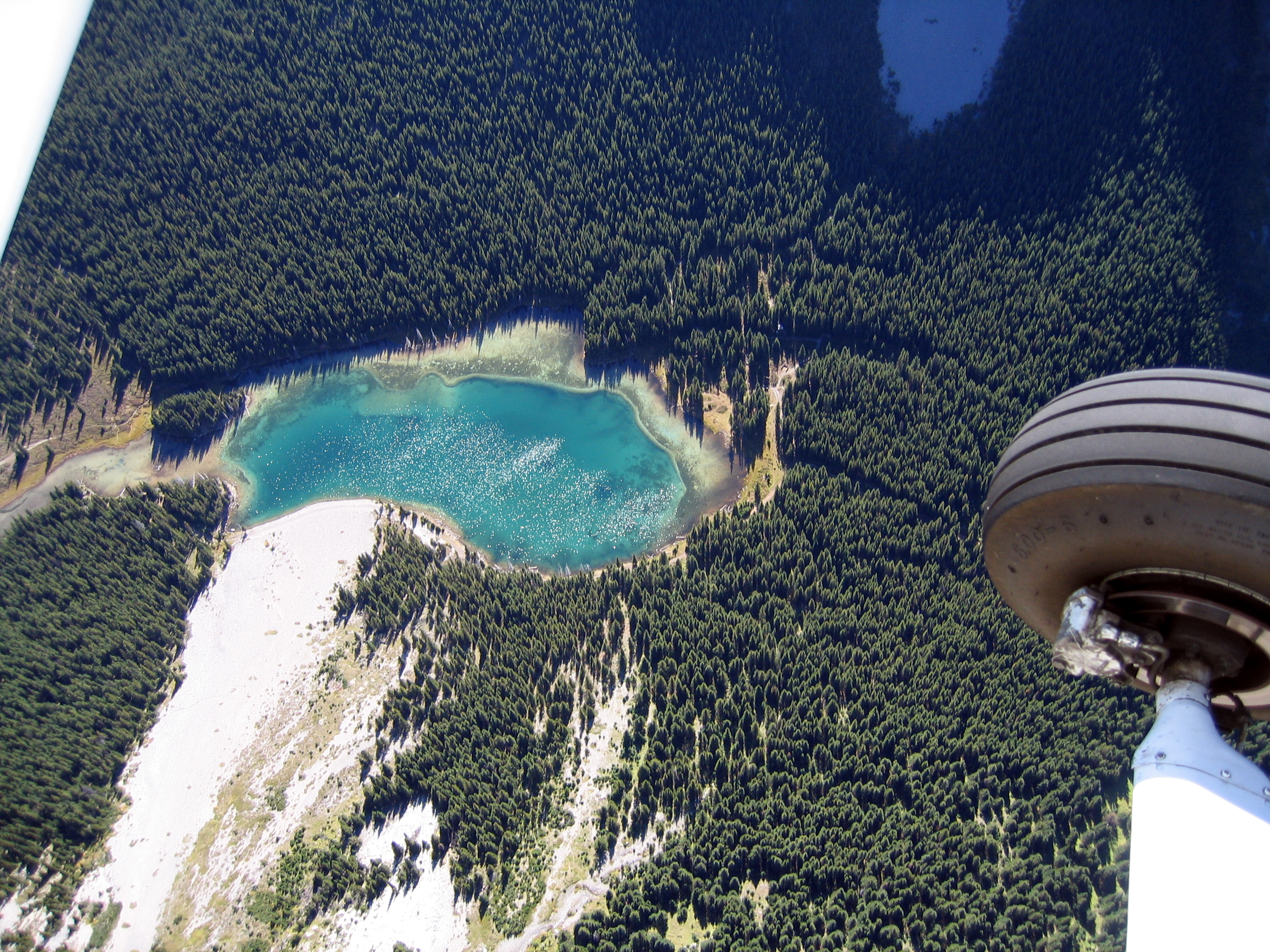
Aerial view of Elbow Lake

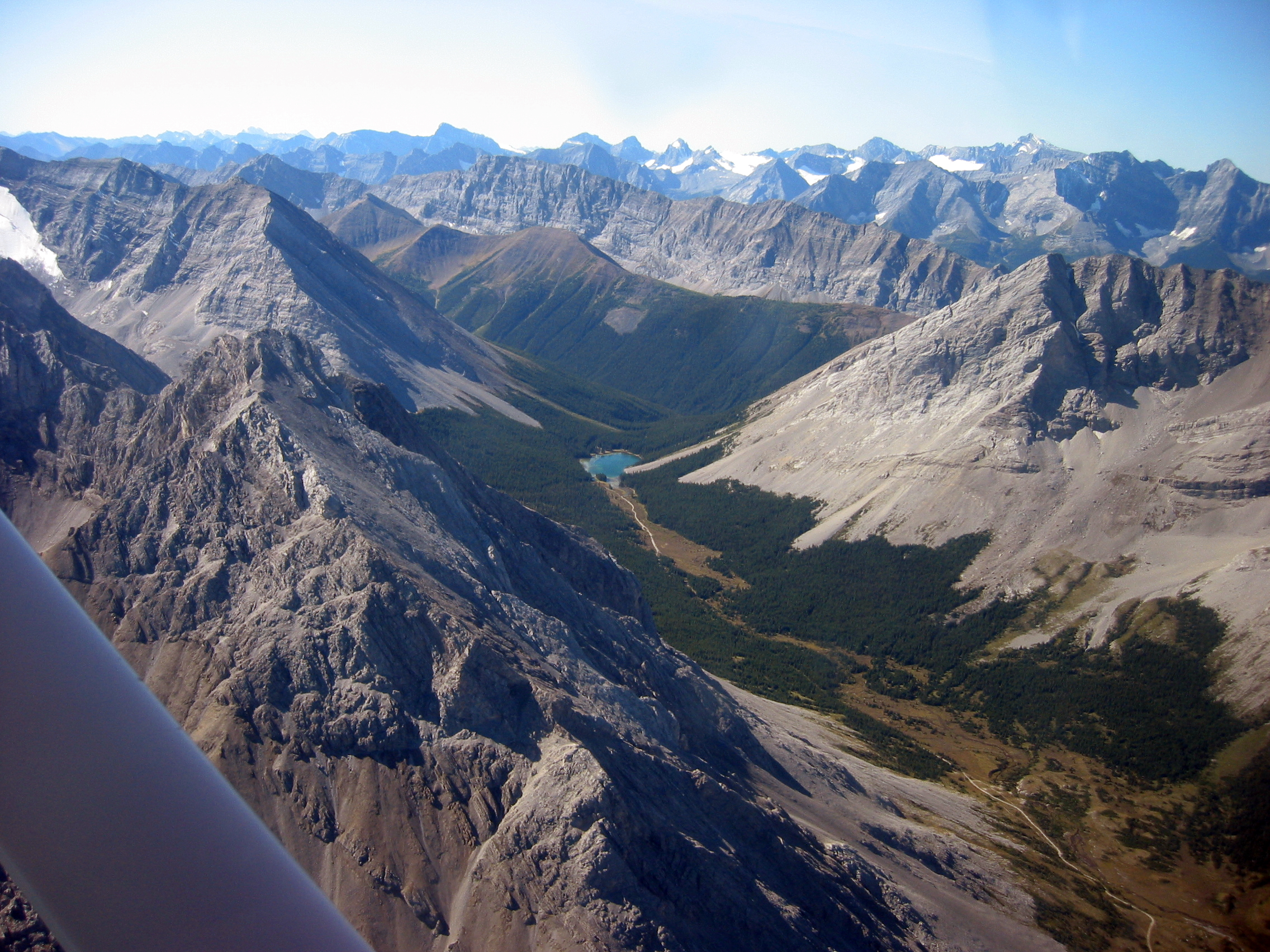
Elbow Valley

== See also ==
- Elbow River
- Lakes of Alberta
