= Shell Danielson =

American actress and writer (born 1962)

Shell Danielson (born September 25, 1962, in Upland, California) is an American actress and writer. She was the third actress to play the role of Laken Lockridge on the NBC soap opera Santa Barbara. She played the role from 1990 to 1991.

Danielson also worked on children's action/adventure series Power Rangers. She joined the cast of the ABC soap General Hospital as the second Dominique Baldwin and played the role until 1993. She also had a short recurring role as Bunny Hutchinson on The Young and the Restless in 2001.

== Acting credits ==
=== Television ===
- Santa Barbara (1990-1991): Laken Lockridge
- General Hospital (1991-1993): Dominique Stanton
- Bodies of Evidence (1992): Jessica Morton
- Baywatch (1994): Annie
- Mighty Morphin Power Rangers (1996): Reporter
- Port Charles (1997-1999): Dominique Stanton
- The Young and the Restless (2001): Bunny Hutchinson

=== Film ===
- Blindfold: Acts of Obsession (1994): Young Female Addict
- Someone to Die For (1995): Lydia Kellerman
- Casper: A Spirited Beginning (1997): Newscaster

== Screenwriting credits ==
=== Television ===
- Sweet Valley High (1994)
- Mighty Morphin Power Rangers (1994-1995)
- Masked Rider (1995)
- Power Rangers Zeo (1996)
- Big Bad Beetleborgs (1996)
- Power Rangers Turbo (1997)

=== Film ===
- Someone to Die For (1995)
- Turbo: A Power Rangers Movie (1997)
- Exception to the Rule (1997)
- Rusty: A Dog’s Tale (1998)
