= Storm (1987 film) =

Canadian drama film

- VHS cover
- Directed by: David Winning
- Written by: David Winning
- Produced by: David Winning
- Starring: David Palffy; Stan Kane; Tom Schioler; Harry Freedman; Lawrence Elion; Stacy Christensen
- Cinematography: Tim Hollings
- Edited by: Bill Campbell
- Music by: Amin Bhatia
- Production company: Groundstar Entertainment
- Distributed by: Cannon Films; Warner Home Video
- Release date: 27 November 1987 (Canada)
- Running time: 102 minutes
- Country: Canada
- Language: English

Storm is a 1987 Canadian drama film and first feature starring David Palffy and Stan Kane directed by David Winning. The film was the debut of director Winning. Two college students on a survival weekend in the wilderness cross paths with three aging criminals looking for treasure buried decades earlier. Made in 24 days on a budget of about $70,000 CDN. The original 81-minute film was filmed near Bragg Creek, west of Calgary, in the summer of 1983, with an initial cast and crew of 10 people. It was released by Warner Home Video on September 1, 1988. Director Winning appears in a small cameo as the younger villain.

== Cast ==
- David Palffy as Lowell Stein
- Stan Kane as Jim
- Tom Schioler as Booker Lewis
- Harry Freedman as Burt
- Lawrence Elion as Stanley
- Stacy Christensen as Cobi
- James Hutchison as The Hostage
- Sean O'Byrne as Danny

== New version ==
23 minutes of additional material added in 1987 was requested by The Cannon Group, Inc. to bring the film up to feature-length for theatrical distribution in Canada and the United States. This addition met with mixed reviews as The Globe and Mail author Stephen Godfrey wrote in his “A Storm Warning” article. He said “the scenes are as refreshing as the rest of the film and show Winning’s talent for creating suspense and sympathy. But the structure of the film is now unbalanced; in its original form, Storm was an elaborate tease, a cat-and-mouse game that escalated gradually...” The new segments were filmed in the winter of January 1987 in Bragg Creek and Calgary, Alberta with the original cast.

== Distribution and theatrical release ==
Storm was picked up by Cannon Films Cannon International for worldwide distribution in December 1986. The Canadian theatrical release was handled separately by Thomas Howe Associates of Vancouver, Canada with a premiere in Calgary November 26, 1987 followed by a Canadian theatrical run. Storm also ran theatrically in Los Angeles in December 1989 to qualify for the Academy Awards and was reviewed positively by the LA Times.

== Reception ==
Kevin Thomas, of the Los Angeles Times called the movie taut, ambitious and darkly comic in a 1989 review. He said the film worked very effectively as a comment on the male psyche and how lethal the mix of fear and aggression can be when men have a need to prove their masculinity for reasons imagined or real. The Globe and Mail writer Jay Scott in an August 28, 1985 review called it a remarkable new thriller and a comic combination of Treasure of the Sierra Madre and Deliverance. Peter Goddard of the Toronto Star wrote Winning's sense of movement within a scene is already masterly. He could make ice melting seem exciting. Fred Haeseker in a November 1987 Calgary Herald review wrote that it's a tongue-in-cheek pastiche of time-honored shock effects and rite-of-passage clichés, seen with a sense of humor that is usually missing from the pictures that spawned them.
