= Michael Ironside =

Canadian actor (born 1950)

- Ironside at GalaxyCon Raleigh in 2026
- Born: Frederick Reginald Ironside; February 12, 1950 (age 76); Toronto, Ontario, Canada
- Occupation: Actor
- Years active: 1977–present
- Spouse: Karen Dinwiddie (m. 1986)
- Children: 2

Frederick Reginald Ironside (born February 12, 1950), known professionally as Michael Ironside, is a Canadian actor. A prominent character actor with more than 270 film and television credits, he is known for playing villains and antiheroes, but has also portrayed sympathetic characters. He is best known for his roles in action and science fiction films, and had his breakthrough performance in the 1981 David Cronenberg film Scanners.

Ironside's other notable roles include Overdog in Spacehunter: Adventures in the Forbidden Zone (1983), Ham Tyler in the television miniseries V: The Final Battle and its following 19-episode series (1984), "Jester" in Top Gun (1986), Richter in Total Recall (1990), and Rasczak in Starship Troopers (1997). His signature deep voice has been lent to various video games and animated television shows, most notably as Sam Fisher in the Tom Clancy's Splinter Cell franchise and Darkseid in the DC Animated Universe.

He is a four-time Gemini Award, a Genie Award, and a Canadian Film Award nominee.

== Early life ==
Frederick Reginald Ironside was born in Toronto on February 12, 1950, the son of housewife Patricia June (née Passmore) and street lighting technician Robert Walter Ironside. He has four siblings and is of English, Irish, Scottish and Welsh descent. He attended the Ontario College of Art in Toronto. At age 15, he wrote a play called The Shelter, which won first prize in a university contest. He also won the senior year writing award at Riverdale Collegiate Institute in 1968.

Ironside gained his love of science fiction as a child, from his grandfather, who was an engineer and member of a sci-fi club with many SF writers, who would send drafts to his grandfather for fact-checking. Ironside read the drafts and SF magazines of his grandfather.

== Career ==
One of Ironside's first roles was as evil telepath Darryl Revok in Scanners (1981), an early film by David Cronenberg. He played the role of a serial killer, Colt Hawker, in the slasher film Visiting Hours (1982) and appeared in 1983 as Miler Crane in The A-Team episode "Taxicab Wars" as well as Overdog McNab in Spacehunter: Adventures in the Forbidden Zone.

Ironside's breakthrough role was as cynical antihero Ham Tyler in the television miniseries V: The Final Battle and its following 19-episode series (1984). He is also known for his roles in Top Gun (1986) as Naval Aviator Lieutenant Commander Rick "Jester" Heatherly, Extreme Prejudice (1987) as Major Paul Hackett, Watchers (1988) as a conscience-free mutant assassin, and Total Recall (1990) as Richter, the murderous henchman of Ronny Cox's villain Cohaagen. In 1991, Ironside played the villainous General Katana in the science fiction sequel Highlander II: The Quickening and also starred in the film Chaindance as a small-time crook, unable to make it on the outside, who was paired up with a disabled man. After a brief stint in ER's inaugural season (1994), he was tapped to replace Roy Scheider as captain of the high-tech submarine seaQuest in the third season of seaQuest DSV as Captain Oliver Hudson. However, NBC cancelled the series after only thirteen episodes with Ironside as the star. In 1992, he starred as M. Emmet Walsh's brother in David Winning's thriller Killer Image. In 1993, he played Dial, the main antagonist of Free Willy. In 1994, Ironside starred as Luck Hatcher in the western Dead Man's Revenge. In 1995, Ironside had a brief cameo as Lt. Col. Stone in Major Payne. In 1997, Ironside was reunited with Total Recall director Paul Verhoeven for Starship Troopers. He appeared in The Perfect Storm (2000) and The Machinist (2004). Ironside starred as Resistance General Hugh Ashdown in Terminator Salvation, reunited with his co-star from The Machinist, Christian Bale. In 2003, Ironside guest starred in season 3 episode 20 ("Twilight of the Idols") of Andromeda.

Ironside voiced comic book villain Darkseid in the DC Animated Universe, including Superman: The Animated Series, Justice League and Justice League Unlimited. He later reprised the role in the 2018 video game Lego DC Supervillains and the 2020 DC Universe/HBO Max web series Harley Quinn. In one episode of The New Batman Adventures, he voiced Batman in a Batman: The Dark Knight Returns sequence. Another part he played in the DC Comics universe was Lois Lane's father, General Sam Lane in three episodes of Smallville.

Ironside has worked in video games as the voice of character Sam Fisher in the Tom Clancy's Splinter Cell games and Jack Granger in Command & Conquer 3: Tiberium Wars. He signed a five-year deal to portray Captain Jonas Trager in the SpaceWorks Television science-fiction series, Ice Planet but the show was not produced.

In 2009, he starred in The Beacon under the direction of Michael Stokes.

In 2010, Ironside guest starred in season 4, episode 1 ("Friends and Enemies") of Burn Notice.

In 2011, Ironside appeared in the film: X-Men: First Class, playing the Captain of the 7th Fleet. He appeared in Justified playing a supporting role as a Detroit hitman the following year. He also voiced the role of Ultra Magnus in season 3 of the Transformers: Prime Beast Hunters television series in 2013.

Ironside appeared in the TV series Walker, Texas Ranger as 'The Chairman'.

In 2015, he appeared in the television series The Flash as Lewis Snart, the father of Captain Cold. Also in 2015, he starred as the main villain Zeus in the cult hit film Turbo Kid.

In 2016, he portrayed General Douglas MacArthur in the 4-part miniseries Tokyo Trial.

In 2018, he played J. P. Morgan in 4 episodes of TNT's The Alienist.

In 2021, he portrayed Eddie Williams, the father-in-law and boss of Hutch Mansell in the film, Nobody.

In 2022, he played Don Lucas in the Hulu miniseries The Dropout.

== Personal life ==
Ironside married Karen Dinwiddie in 1986; they have one daughter together (born 1998) and he has another daughter from a previous marriage. He has lived in Los Angeles County, California since 1982.

He is a fan of the Toronto Maple Leafs in the NHL.

Ironside has survived cancer of the bowel, prostate, and thyroid.
