= Natalie Brown (actress) =

Canadian actress and model

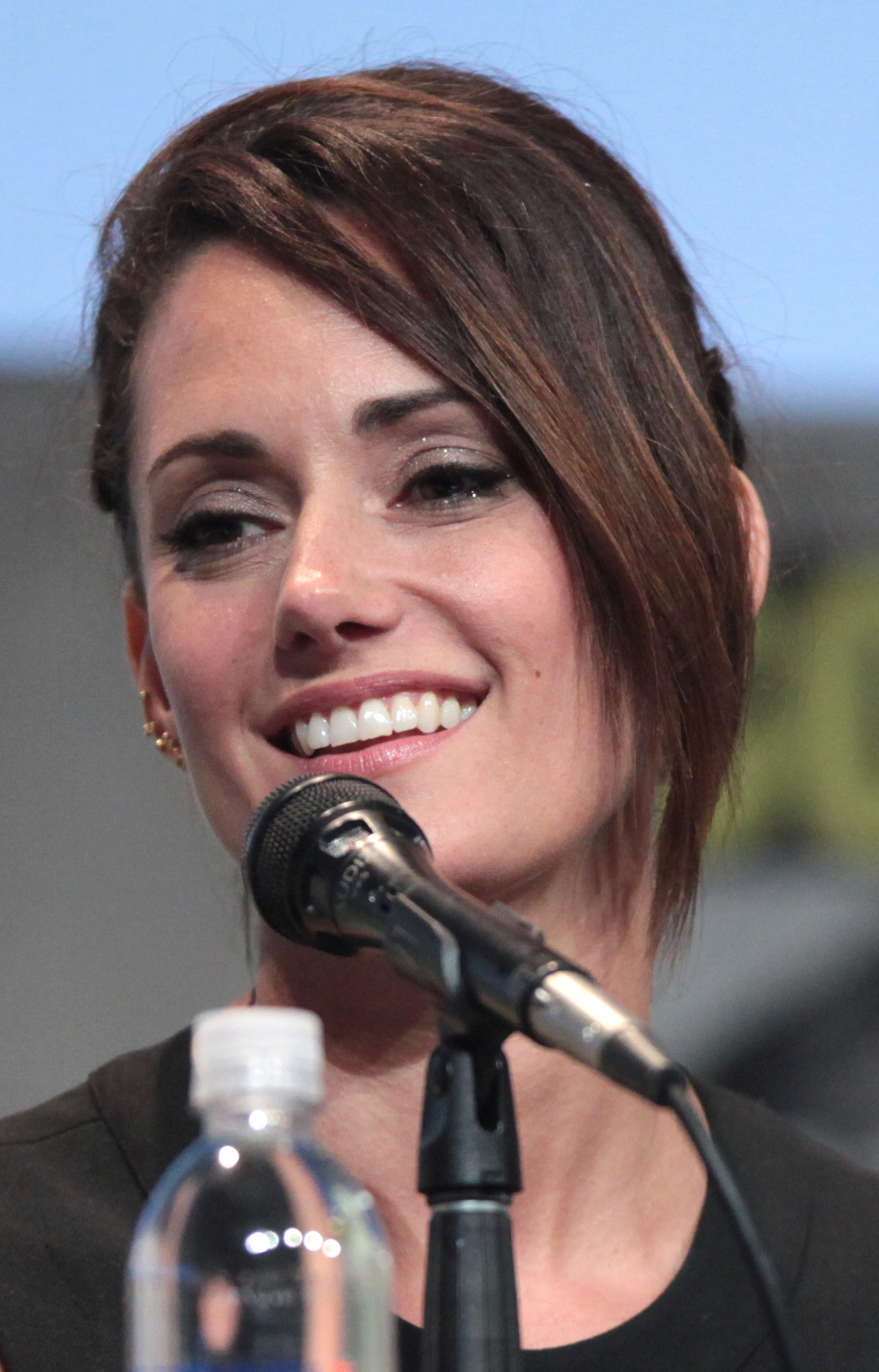
- Brown at the 2015 San Diego Comic-Con
- Born: Timmins, Ontario, Canada
- Occupations: Actress, model
- Years active: 1997–present

Natalie Brown is a Canadian actress and model.

== Career ==
Brown landed her first print campaign for Bonne Bell at age 16 and went on to become the Heinz Ketchup girl. She also modeled for Noxzema and Max Factor, and studied fine arts at York University.

She played talent agent Sophie Parker on the television sitcom Sophie, which ran for two seasons, and grieving mother Carol Haplin on six of the eight episodes of the ABC series Happy Town. Her other credits include ReGenesis, Naked Josh, Mutant X, Zoe Busiek: Wild Card, Something Beneath, Dawn of the Dead, Welcome to Mooseport, How to Lose a Guy in 10 Days, MTV's Undressed, Tracker, Flashpoint, Dark Matter The Strain and You're Killing Me. In the 2016 Hallmark original movie For Love & Honor, she played a dean at a military school.

She is also known in Canada for her work in television commercials, particularly those for Baileys Irish Cream, Salon Selectives, Canada Post, and Yoplait.

== Filmography ==
=== Film ===
| Year | Title | Role | Notes |
|---|---|---|---|
| 1997 | Here Dies Another Day | Girl #2 | |
| 2003 | How to Lose a Guy in 10 Days | Mrs. Sawyer | |
| 2004 | Welcome to Mooseport | Laurie Smith | |
| 2004 | Dawn of the Dead | CDC Reporter | |
| 2006 | The Last Sect | Sydney St. James | |
| 2006 | Not Pretty, Really | Pretty Person | Short film |
| 2008 | Saw V | Heather Miller | Scenes deleted |
| 2008 | The Cello | Claude | Short film |
| 2010 | The Conversation | Her | Short film |
| 2011 | Counselling | Sasha | Short film |
| 2011 | Irvine Welsh's Ecstasy | Marie | |
| 2012 | Little Brother | Jane Vidal | Short film |
| 2013 | Compulsion | Rebecca | |
| 2013 | Home Stuff | Actress | Short Film |
| 2014 | Hit Men | Florence | Short film |
| 2015 | Friends Like Us | Mary | Short film |
| 2015 | How to Plan an Orgy in a Small Town | Anna | |
| 2017 | XX | Susan Jacobs | "The Box" segment |
| 2017 | White Night | Stacey | |
| 2017 | Blood Honey | Natalie Heath | |
| 2018 | Crown and Anchor | Jessica | |
| 2018 | Damage Control | Natalie | Short film |
| 2019 | Canadian Strain | Valerie | |
| 2022 | Ashgrove | Sammy | |
| 2023 | The Breach | Linda Parsons | |
| 2024 | Home Free | Daisy Homur | |
| 2026 | 111 Echoes from Halifax | | |

=== Television ===
| Year | Title | Role | Notes |
|---|---|---|---|
| 1998–1999 | Mythic Warriors | Atalanta (voice) | Recurring role (4 episodes) |
| 2001 | Tracker | Peggy | Episode: "The Plague" |
| 2002 | Mutant X | Secretary | Episode: "No Man Left Behind" |
| 2002 | Undressed | Brianne | TV series (season 6) |
| 2003 | 72 Hours: True Crime | Neal's Wife | Episode: "Hate Crime" |
| 2003 | The Crooked E: The Unshredded Truth About Enron | Amber St. Pierre (Miss April) | TV film |
| 2003 | Sue Thomas: F.B.Eye | Allie | Episodes: "Prodigal Father", "He Said She Said" |
| 2003 | Missing | Denise Whitmore | Episode: "72 Hours to Kill" |
| 2004 | Wild Card | Faith | Episode: "Bada Bing, Bada Busiek" |
| 2005 | Tilt | Waitress | Episode: "Rivered" |
| 2005 | Descent | Jen | TV film |
| 2005 | Naked Josh | Lisa | Episode: "The Thrill of the Chase" |
| 2006 | 10.5: Apocalypse | Paula | TV miniseries |
| 2006 | Black Widower | Saundra Amos | TV film |
| 2006 | ReGenesis | Hilda | Episode: "Gene in a Bottle" |
| 2006 | Cradle of Lies | Michelle Fox | TV film |
| 2007 | Something Beneath | Khali Spence | TV film |
| 2007 | I Me Wed | Marla | TV film |
| 2007 | Ten Seconds | Emma Parks | TV short |
| 2008 | True Crime Scene | Susan Hayes | Episode: "Fugitive Justice" |
| 2008 | Testees | Janet Parker | Episode: "Pineapple Shampoo" |
| 2008–2009 | Sophie | Sophie Parker | Lead role (32 episodes) |
| 2009 | The Dating Guy | Marie Claire (voice) | Episode: "Boner Donor" |
| 2010 | Shadow Island Mysteries: Wedding for One | Monica Johnson | TV film (Hallmark movie series) |
| 2010 | Happy Town | Carol Haplin | Recurring role (6 episodes) |
| 2010 | Fairfield Road | Wendy Greenhill | TV film |
| 2010 | Covert Affairs | Patricia Ridley | Episode: "I Can't Quit You, Baby" |
| 2010 | The Last Christmas | Monica | TV film |
| 2010 | Cancel Christmas | Jeannie Claymore | TV film |
| 2011 | Flashpoint | Det. Merry Danner | Episode: "I'd Do Anything" |
| 2011 | Skins | Leslie Campbell | Episodes: "Cadie", "Stanley" |
| 2011 | Against the Wall | Dr. Trish Alexander | Episode: "Obsessed and Unwanted" |
| 2011 | Lost Girl | Sabine Purcell | Episode: "I Fought the Fae (and the Fae Won)" |
| 2012 | Comedy Bar | Sandra Sheriff / Sarah Sheriff | Recurring role (5 episodes) |
| 2012 | Republic of Doyle | Jessica Crowley | Episode: "High School Confidential" |
| 2012 | Being Human | Julia | Recurring role (6 episodes) |
| 2012 | Cyberstalker | Jill Gachet | TV film |
| 2013 | Exploding Sun | Cheryl Wincroft | TV film |
| 2013 | Be My Valentine | Kate | TV film |
| 2013 | The Surrogacy Trap | Allison | TV film |
| 2013 | Cracked | Det. Rachel Fenton | Recurring role (7 episodes) |
| 2014 | Darknet | Barbara | Episode: "Darknet 2" |
| 2014 | The Listener | Dr. Mallory Kesler | Episode: "Man in the Mirror" |
| 2014 | Bitten | Diane McAdams | Recurring role (seasons 1–2) |
| 2014–2017 | The Strain | Kelly Goodweather | Main role |
| 2015-2017 | Dark Matter | Sarah | Recurring role (11 episodes; 3 uncredited, 1 credit only) |
| 2015 | iZombie | Uma Voss | Episode: "The Hurt Stalker" |
| 2016 | Private Eyes | Veronique | Episode: "Partners in Crime" |
| 2016 | For Love & Honor | Caroline Foster | TV film |
| 2016 | Channel Zero: Candle Cove | Jessica Yolen | Main role (6 episodes) |
| 2018 | Schitt's Creek | Heather Warner | Episode: "RIP Moira Rose" |
| 2018 | The Crossing | Mayor Vanessa Conway | Episodes: "Some Dreamers of the Golden Dream", "The Long Morrow" |
| 2018 | Jack Ryan | Rebecca | Recurring role |
| 2018 | Frankie Drake Mysteries | Bessie Starkman | Recurring role |
| 2019 | Ransom | Kate Barrett | Recurring role (season 3) |
| 2020 | The Expanse | Rona | Episodes: "Gaugamela", "Down and Out" |
| 2021 | Hudson & Rex | Julia Tillman | Episode: "Rex Marks the Spot" |
| 2024 | Locked in My House | Caris Carter | TV film |
| 2026 | You're Killing Me | Melissa Grant | 3 eps "The Front Window," "The Road Trip" & "The Sacrifice" |

=== Video game ===
| Year | Title | Role | Notes |
|---|---|---|---|
| 2012 | Far Cry 3 | Daisy Lee (voice) | |
| 2013 | Assassin's Creed III: The Tyranny of King Washington | Kaniehtí:io (voice) | |

== Awards and nominations ==
| Year | Award | Category | Nominated work | Result | Ref. |
|---|---|---|---|---|---|
| 2008 | Gemini Awards | Best Individual Performance in a Comedy Program or Series | Sophie | Nominated | |
| 2016 | Canadian Filmmakers' Festival | Best Ensemble (shared with cast members) | How to Plan an Orgy in a Small Town | Won | |
| 2016 | Golden Maple Awards | Best Actress in a TV Series Broadcast in the U.S. | The Strain | Won | |
