= Elbow Pass =

Mountain pass in Alberta, Canada

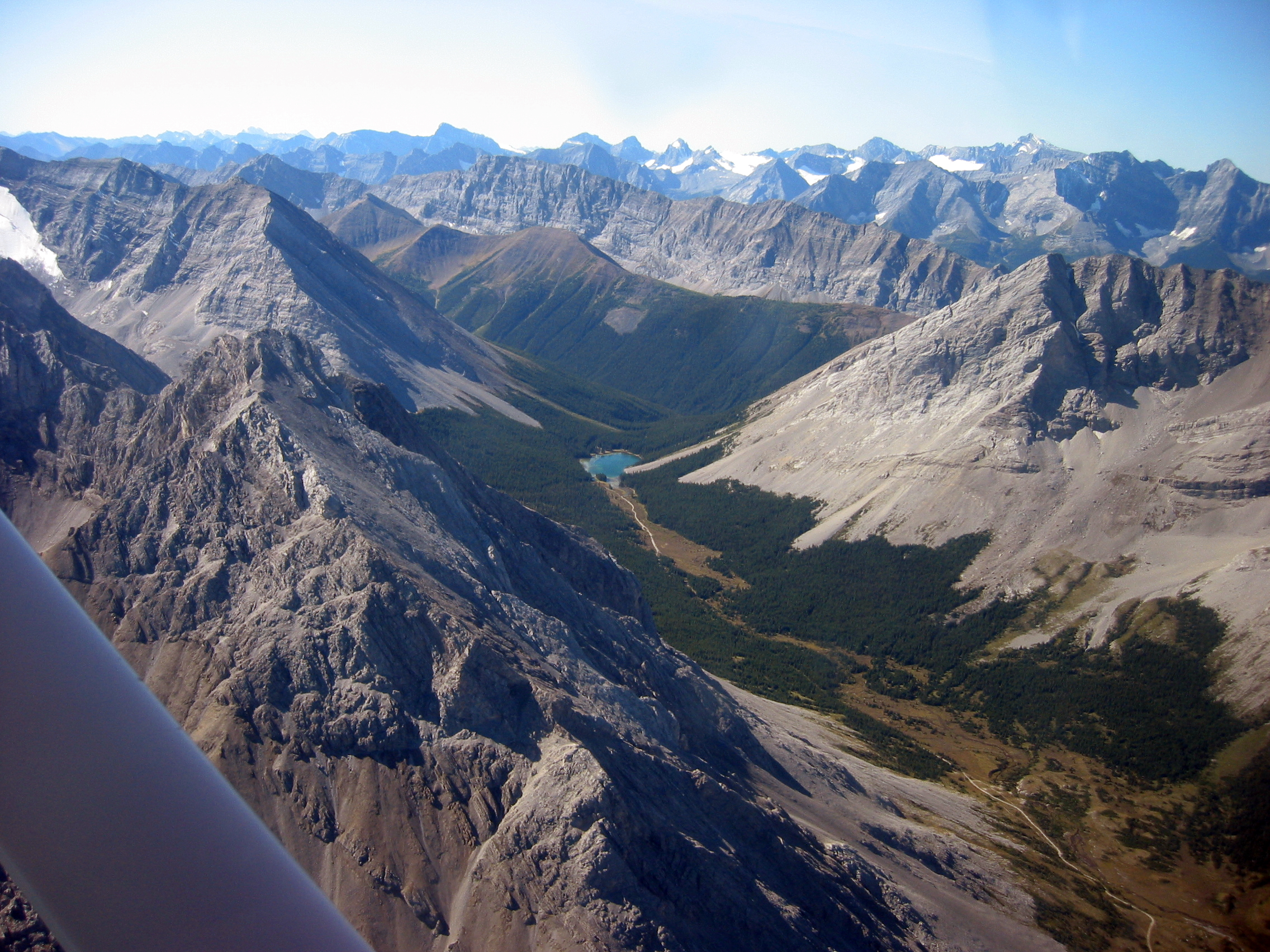
- Elbow Pass viewed from above Desolation Flat

- Location within Alberta
- Elevation: 2,088 metres (6,850 ft)

Location
- Location: Kananaskis Country, Alberta, Canada
- Range: Misty Range
- Coordinates: 50°38′08″N 115°00′42″W
- Topo map: NTS 82J11 Kananaskis Lakes

Elbow Pass is the mountain pass between the Highwood and Elbow areas in Kananaskis Country, Alberta, Canada. It contains Elbow Lake which is the headwaters of the Elbow River.

The pass is formed between Mount Rae of the Misty Range and Gap Mountain of the Opal Range.

Good hiking and mountain biking routes connect the Little Elbow Recreation Area at the end of Highway 66 to the Highwood Pass area on Bighorn Highway.
