= Something Beneath =

- DVD cover
- Directed by: David Winning
- Written by: Mark Mullin; Ethlie Ann Vare; David Winning
- Produced by: Phyllis Laing
- Starring: Kevin Sorbo; Natalie Brown; Brendan Beiser
- Cinematography: Brenton Spencer
- Edited by: Mark Sanders
- Music by: Michael Richard Plowman
- Production companies: RHI Entertainment; Buffalo Gal Pictures; Hallmark Entertainment; Paquin Films; Sci Fi Pictures
- Distributed by: Time Warner Cable
- Release dates: April 26, 2007 (Houston Film Festival); October 21, 2007 (Canada)
- Running time: 90 minutes
- Country: Canada
- Language: English

Something Beneath is a 2007 Canadian horror thriller film directed by David Winning and starring Kevin Sorbo, Natalie Brown and Brendan Beiser. It is the fifth film in the Maneater film series.

== Plot ==
On the Cedar Gates Conference Center (CGCC) construction site, Dutch comes into contact with some black slime from the newly broken ground. He hallucinates that Bob (whose wife is sleeping with Dutch) and several others are chasing him down in bulldozers until he trips and is impaled on some exposed rebar— his death is attributed to drinking.

A year later, an ecological conference is being held at the newly opened CGCC, led by the Episcopalian priest Father Douglas Middleton. He meets CGCC manager Symes and event coordinator Khali Spence. Middleton's friend and keynote speaker Eugene Herman is practicing his speech in the woods nearby when he is pulled into a slime pit and suffocated by an unseen creature. The next day Middleton alerts Khali to his friend's disappearance, so she and CGCC Chief of Security Jackson Deadmarsh check Eugene's room. They find Reggie and Hank (maintenance men) searching for an undiscovered pipe blockage causing hotel-wide problems, but they have not seen Eugene. Deadmarsh and his assistant, Tony, explore the woods and eventually find Eugene's body, his face badly contorted and disfigured.

Meanwhile, Middleton searches elsewhere due to his troubled history with Deadmarsh and encounters Mikaela Strovsky, an entitled celebrity/model running after her dog, Cleopatra. She is covered in black slime and tells the hotel staff to find her dog so she can return to her room to clean up and record a vlog. While recording, she hallucinates an old, eyeless woman in her room's mirrors and eventually smashes them all, fatally cutting her wrists. Manuela, a housekeeping employee, finds Mikaela dead in her room, and her death is labeled a suicide. Symes forbids Khali from calling the police immediately, and she eventually comes in contact with some black slime herself. She hallucinates being chased by the dog that attacked her as a child, and she tries to use her grandmother's necklace for protection. Middleton wakes her from the hallucination, revealing the dog is only Cleopatra. A flashback reveals Khali's necklace was blessed with a prayer from the Ojibwe, her grandmother's people. Reggie and Hank enter the sewers under CGCC, where they find a massive growth of black slime that eats them both. Father Middleton and Khali encounter Dr. Connolly, now living in the woods and continuing his research into the slime. He believes it is a single organism with a hive mind, comparing it to an ant colony that had attacked when the building of the CGCC threatened its habitat, but this organism can reproduce at alarming rates.

Back at the hotel, Deadmarsh views the vlog that Mikaela was recording and saw a slime-covered creature crawl out of her bathtub as she's smashing the mirrors. He and Tony go into the sewers to look for Reggie and Hank. Symes is livid that all the guests of CGCC are evacuating themselves but begins hallucinating when he comes into contact with the slime. He follows Deadmarsh and Tony into the sewers and tries attacking them, but Tony shoots him. Tony and Deadmarsh are slimed by this point, and Tony hallucinates that Symes returns to life. Deadmarsh finds his body as Connolly, Middleton, and Khali enter the sewer and find him. Together, they find Reggie and Hank's bodies and discover the slime is starting to seal up all exits. Deadmarsh sacrifices himself so the others can escape, setting aflame the methane leaking out from the sewer walls after the others are behind a sealed metal door. They come across the creature's heart, including its mouth, and Connolly falls into it. Middleton saves Khali as she is about to fall in, and she uses her grandmother's necklace to calm the creature by reciting the Ojibwe prayer. They escape, and Middleton reconnects with Khali at the ambulance and confesses his hallucination was that Khali fell into the creature and died. He asks her to leave on his next mission, and she agrees; they kiss. Later, more slime emerges from a manhole.

== Cast ==
- Kevin Sorbo as Father Douglas Middleton
- Gordon Tanner as Symes, the manager of Cedar Gates Conference Center (CGCC)
- Natalie Brown as Khali Spence, events coordinator for Cedar Gates Conference Center; her grandmother was Ojibwe, and she wears her necklace supposedly traditional Anishinaabe
- Paige Bannister as Aimee, Khali's assistant
- Peter MacNeill as Jackson Deadmarsh, CGCC Head of Security; was a former chief of police in Oregon but was involved in a scandal when Father Middleton sued him for the wrongful arrest and eventual execution of a young Native American man on false evidence
- Blake Taylor as Reggie, head maintenance for CGCC
- Tom Keenan as Hank, Reggie's assistant
- Brittany Scobie as Mikaela Strovsky, a stuck-up celebrity/model attending the conference for the clout of being an environmentalist; "last month's cover of Vogue"
- Frank Adamson as Lowell Kent, the property developer for Cedar Gates Conference Center, reliant on a wheelchair and on oxygen
- Brendan Beiser as Dr. Connolly, a scientist who warns Kent of the dangers of building on the grounds
- Brett Donahue as Tony, Deadmarsh's assistant
- Rob McLaughlin as Eugene Herman, keynote speaker for the conference; severely asthmatic
- Gene Pyrz as Jim Bailey
- Tracey Nepinak as Khali's Grandmother
- Aimee Cadorath as Young Khali
- Kevin Aichele as Dutch, a construction worker and the first victim of the slime though his death is labeled an accident
- Mike Bell as Construction Foreman
- Brandon Doty as Backpacking Hippie
- Lindsay Embroyle as Paramedic
- David Stuart Evans as Clerk
- Craig Matthews as Hard Hat
- Kyle Nobess as Sheik Abdula
- Thanya Romero as Manuela, a young housekeeping employee for CGCC
- Tanakh as Ajax
- Karl Thordarson as Mr. Briggs
- Julia Van de Spiegle as Woman in the Mirror (from Mikaela's hallucination)
- David Winning as Beast in the Woods / Angry Arab guest / TV-announcer

== Production ==
The movie was filmed in Winnipeg, Manitoba in November 2006. In a 2007 FearNet interview, Sorbo described it as "sort of a flip back to the '50s creature films."

== Release ==
The film premiered on 26 April 2007 as part of the Houston Film Festival and was then a feature of the Rhode Island International Film Festival on 11 August 2007.

== Home media ==
The film was released on DVD by RHI Entertainment on 9 September 2008 and produced for television originally by Genius Entertainment.

It was released on DVD in Germany on 25 February 2010, under the title "Endstation: Angriff aus dem Untergrund".
