= Killer Image =

1992 Canadian suspense film by David Winning

- DVD cover
- Directed by: David Winning
- Written by: David Winning; Stan Edmonds
- Produced by: David Winning; Bruce Harvey; Rudy Barichello
- Starring: Michael Ironside; John Pyper-Ferguson; M. Emmet Walsh; Krista Errickson
- Cinematography: Dean Bennett
- Edited by: David Winning; Ron Sanders; Alan Collins; Anne Ditchburn
- Music by: Stephen Foster
- Distributed by: Groundstar Entertainment; Malofilm; Seville Pictures (video release)
- Release date: 1992
- Running time: 92 minutes
- Country: Canada
- Language: English
- Budget: C$750,000 (estimated)

Killer Image is a 1992 independent Canadian suspense film directed by David Winning. It stars Michael Ironside and John Pyper-Ferguson. The story centers on two brothers, one a powerful senator, one a ruthless killer. A photographer captures images of the politician in a compromising position and is murdered. Now his brother has discovered the film and wants vengeance.

== Plot ==
When Max Oliver (John Pyper-Ferguson) learns his photographer brother has been killed, he suspects it was no random murder. And when he finds his brothers' last photos of a powerful senator (M. Emmet Walsh) and a prostitute, Max gets a clear picture of a deadly political cover-up. Seeking to expose his brother's killer, Max enters a murderous game of cat and mouse, stalked by a cold-blooded assassin (Michael Ironside) who has Max dead in his sights.

== Cast ==
- Michael Ironside as Luther Kane
- John Pyper-Ferguson as Max Oliver
- Krista Errickson as Shelley
- M. Emmet Walsh as Senator John Kane
- Paul Austin as Ric Oliver
- Chantelle Jenkins as Lori

== Production ==
The film was shot in the September and October 1990 in locations in and around Calgary, Alberta. Production took 20 days. Malofilm, a distributor from Montreal, and Pierre David, in Los Angeles, were partially funding the project, along with seed-money from the Alberta government. The film was released in Canada and the United States in 1992, being distributed by Malofilm, but did not receive a home video release until the early 1993 thru Paramount Home Video and received its US premiere as a finalist at the 1992 Houston Film Festival. Elbow Falls was used in the climatic scene. Actor Michael Ironside falls to his death here at the end of the film.

== Reception ==
The Calgary Herald published a review in March 1992 that said David Winning’s sharp stylish exploitation movie, is a triumph of first-rate technique over less than first-rate content. Chuck O’Leary on Rotten Tomatoes called it an implausible B thriller made watchable by Michael Ironside's portrayal of another clenched-jawed psycho.
