= M. Emmet Walsh =

American actor (1935–2024)

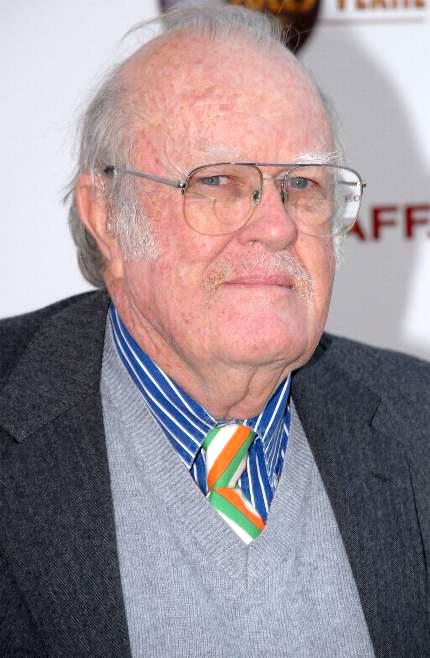
- Walsh in 2007
- Born: Michael Emmet Walsh; March 22, 1935; Ogdensburg, New York, US
- Died: March 19, 2024 (aged 88); St. Albans, Vermont, US
- Resting place: Holy Cross Cemetery, Saint Albans, Vermont, US
- Education: Clarkson University (BA)
- Occupations: Actor; comedian
- Years active: 1968–2024

Michael Emmet Walsh (March 22, 1935 – March 19, 2024) was an American actor who appeared in over 200 films and television series, including supporting roles as Earl Frank in Straight Time (1978), the Madman in The Jerk (1979), Captain Bryant in Blade Runner (1982), Harv in Critters (1986), and Walt Scheel in Christmas with the Kranks (2004). He starred as private detective Loren Visser in Blood Simple (1984), the Coen brothers' first film, for which he won the Independent Spirit Award for Best Male Lead.

Walsh's other numerous film appearances include Little Big Man (1970), What's Up, Doc? (1972), Serpico (1973), The Gambler (1974), Bound for Glory (1976), Slap Shot (1977), Airport '77 (1977), Brubaker (1980), Ordinary People (1980), Reds (1981), Silkwood (1983), Missing in Action (1984), Fletch (1985), Back to School (1986), Raising Arizona (1987), Romeo + Juliet (1996), My Best Friend's Wedding (1997), The Iron Giant (1999), Calvary (2014), and Knives Out (2019). Over five decades as a character actor, he credited roles in more than 220 films and television shows.

== Early life and education ==
Michael Emmet Walsh was born on March 22, 1935, in Ogdensburg, New York, the son of Agnes Katharine (née Sullivan) and Harry Maurice Walsh Sr., who was a customs agent, as were his grandfather and brother. He was of Irish descent, and was raised in rural Swanton, Vermont, where he underwent a mastoid operation at age 3, which left Walsh deaf in his left ear.

Walsh graduated from Clarkson University in 1958 (B.A., Business Administration), where he dabbled in stage productions. Encouraged by a faculty advisor, he moved to New York City to study at the American Academy of Dramatic Arts.

== Career ==
Walsh performed in regional theater in the 1960s, first as a prop man. He made his Broadway debut in 1969, with Al Pacino, in Does a Tiger Wear a Necktie?. Many years later, in 2004, Walsh appeared in the London production of Sam Shepard's Buried Child.

According to his manager, Sandy Joseph, "Walsh's tremendous body of work includes 119 feature films and more than 250 television productions." Being partially deaf in one ear and with an accent harkening from Vermont made it clear to Walsh: "I wasn't going to do Shaw and Shakespeare and Molière — my speech was simply too bad." His persona was a "mesmerising everyman and an indelible gargoyle" who featured "poached-egg eyes."

Walsh specialized in playing villains who were blissfully oblivious to their villainy. He brought a "delightfully menacing presence" to his characters. He was a no-nonsense worker bee in the film industry. Walsh characterized himself as approaching "each job thinking it might be my last, so it better be the best work possible. I want to be remembered as a working actor. I'm being paid for what I'd do for nothing."

Walsh spent years honing his craft in movie bit parts and on stage. His first appearance in films was uncredited in Midnight Cowboy (1969), followed by Alice's Restaurant (1969), Little Big Man (1970), Escape from the Planet of the Apes (1971), They Might Be Giants (1971), What's Up, Doc? (1972), Serpico (1973), The Gambler (1974), Bound for Glory (1976), and Airport '77 (1977), Walsh came to prominence in the 1977 hockey comedy film Slap Shot, in which he played the cynical small-town sportswriter Dickie Dunn, and the 1978 crime film Straight Time, in which he played a vicious parole officer opposite Dustin Hoffman. USA Today film critic Mike Clark wrote that the film character who was "a cesspool in a flowered shirt" was typically Walsh. He also had a small but memorable role as a crazed sniper in the Steve Martin comedy The Jerk (1979), followed by roles in the drama films Brubaker (1980), Ordinary People (1980), and Reds (1981).

=== Bigger roles ===
One of his best-known roles was Captain Harry Bryant in Ridley Scott's science fiction cult film Blade Runner (1982). He characterized Blade Runner as being especially difficult and tiresome to make, given director Ridley Scott's insistence on perfection. As a hard-bitten police commander, Walsh's character brings Deckard (Harrison Ford) out of retirement to "retire" cyborgs, telling Deckard, "I need your magic." Walsh allowed that he was completely confused as Blade Runner was filmed, and did not have any idea where it was going.

In 1983, Walsh appeared in Mike Nichols' biographical film Silkwood. In 1984, he appeared in Joseph Zito's action film Missing in Action, and was cast as a crooked Texas private eye in the film noir Blood Simple, which was the Coen brothers' first film and resulted in Walsh winning the first Independent Spirit Award for Best Male Lead. Pauline Kael praised Walsh's performance: "his broad buffoonery helps to ground the picture, to keep it jaundiced and low-down." He then reteamed with the Coen brothers for Raising Arizona (1987) as a memorable "yakking machine shop worker".

Other film roles include a prostate examining doctor in the Chevy Chase film Fletch (1985), a college diving coach in the Rodney Dangerfield film Back to School (1986), a police chief in the horror film Critters (1986), John Lithgow’s father in the Bigfoot comedy Harry and the Hendersons (1987), the apothecary in Baz Luhrmann's Romeo + Juliet (1996), father of the groom in the romantic comedy My Best Friend's Wedding (1997), the voice of Earl Stutz in animated film The Iron Giant (1999), the adventure film Snow Dogs (2002), and the Christmas comedy film Christmas with the Kranks (2004), where he played one of the Kranks' neighbors. In 1992, he appeared as a US senator in David Winning's Canadian film Killer Image. He later appeared as a writer in the Irish comedy-drama film Calvary (2014), and a security guard in the mystery film Knives Out (2019).

=== Television ===
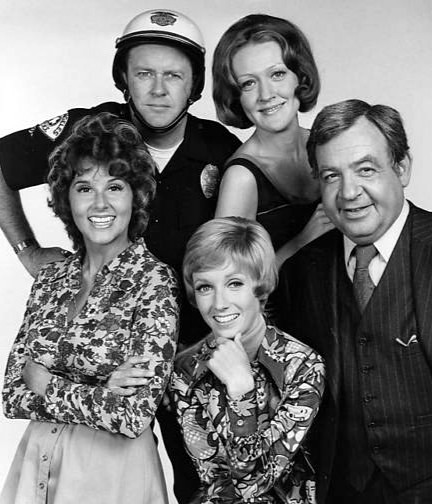
Walsh (top left) as Alex Lembeck on The Sandy Duncan Show in 1972

On television, in September 1971, Walsh appeared in Season 2, Episode 1 of All in the Family and also appeared as Alex Lembeck, a motorcycle cop who appointed himself as Sandy Stockton's chaperone and protector on The Sandy Duncan Show in 1972. He appeared in an episode of the NBC drama series Gibbsville in 1976 and Little House on the Prairie in 1981. Walsh also made occasional guest appearances on Home Improvement as Tim Taylor's father-in-law in 1994. Other appearances included Early Edition, The X-Files, Ed, and Frasier. He also appeared as Dr. Joseph Krofft, a medical examiner with a grudge against Andy Sipowicz, on an episode of NYPD Blue. Later appearances included the series Sneaky Pete and The Righteous Gemstones.

He was a member of the Screen Actors Guild, Actors Equity, the Academy of Motion Picture Arts and Sciences, and The Television Academy.

== Legacy and accolades ==
In 1998, the Clarkson Alumni Association presented Walsh with its Golden Knight Award.

Critic Nicolas Rapold called Walsh "a consummate old pro of the second-banana business", while movie critic Roger Ebert hailed him as "the poet of sleaze". Ebert also fabricated his "Stanton-Walsh Rule": "No movie featuring either Harry Dean Stanton or M. Emmet Walsh in a supporting role can be altogether bad." Walsh was "ham-faced, heavyset" and "often played good old boys with bad intentions".

In 2018, Walsh was inducted into the Character Actor Hall of Fame by his Blade Runner co-star Harrison Ford. Later in the same ceremony, he received the Chairman's Lifetime Achievement Award.

Walsh established the Blarney Fund Education Trust in 1979 to provide scholarships for college to needy high school graduates in the Swanton, Vermont, area.

== Personal life ==
Walsh had a reputation for generosity and wry wit. He habitually distributed two-dollar bills to the set's crew, with some advice: "Don't spend it, and you'll never be broke."

== Death ==
Walsh died of cardiac arrest at Northwestern Medical Center in St. Albans, Vermont, on March 19, 2024, three days before his 89th birthday.

== Filmography ==
=== Film ===
Year	Title	Role	Notes	References
1969	Alice's Restaurant	Group W Sergeant		
1969	Midnight Cowboy	Bus Passenger	Uncredited	
1969	Stiletto	Racing Partner	Uncredited	
1970	Loving	Waiter	Uncredited	
1970	End of the Road	Crab Man / Tutu Man		
1970	The Traveling Executioner	Warden Brodski		
1970	Little Big Man	Shotgun Guard		
1971	Cold Turkey	Art		
1971	Escape from the Planet of the Apes	Aide to General Winthrop		
1971	They Might Be Giants	1st Sanitation Man		
1972	What's Up, Doc?	Arresting Officer		
1972	Get to Know Your Rabbit	Mr. Wendel		
1973	Kid Blue	The Barber		
1973	Serpico	Chief Gallagher		
1974	The Gambler	Las Vegas Gambler		
1975	At Long Last Love	Harold		
1975	Crime Club	Lieutenant Jack Doyle		
1975	The Prisoner of Second Avenue	Joe		
1976	Bound for Glory	Husband		
1976	Nickelodeon	Father Logan		
1976	The Invasion of Johnson County	Irvine		
1976	Mikey and Nicky	Bus Driver		
1977	Slap Shot	Dickie Dunn		
1977	Airport '77	Dr. Harvard Williams		
1978	Straight Time	Earl Frank		
1979	The Fish That Saved Pittsburgh	Wally Cantrell		
1979	The Jerk	Madman		
1980	Brubaker	C.P. "Woody" Woodward		
1980	Raise the Titanic	Master Chief Vinnie Walker		
1980	Ordinary People	Coach Salan		
1981	Back Roads	Arthur		
1981	Reds	Speaker At Liberal Club		
1982	Cannery Row	Mack		
1982	The Escape Artist	Fritz		
1982	Blade Runner	Captain Bryant		
1982	Fast-Walking	Sergeant Sanger		
1983	Silkwood	Walt Yarborough		
1984	Raw Courage	Colonel Crouse		
1984	Missing in Action	Jack "Tuck" Tucker		
1984	Grandview, U.S.A.	Mr. Clark		
1984	Blood Simple	Loren Visser, PI		
1984	The Pope of Greenwich Village	Detective Burns		
1984	Scandalous	Simon Reynolds		
1985	Fletch	Dr. Joseph Dolan		
1986	Wildcats	Walt Coes		
1986	Critters	Harvey "Harv"		
1986	The Best of Times	Charlie		
1986	Back to School	Coach Turnbull		
1987	Harry and the Hendersons	George Henderson Sr.		
1987	No Man's Land	Captain Haun		
1987	Raising Arizona	Machine Shop Ear-Bender		
1988	The Milagro Beanfield War	Governor		
1988	Clean and Sober	Richard Dirk		
1988	Sunset	Chief Marvin Dibner		
1988	War Party	Colin Ditwelier		
1988	Red Scorpion	Dewey Ferguson		
1989	The Mighty Quinn	CIA Agent Fred Miller		
1989	Catch Me If You Can	Johnny Phatmun		
1989	Chattahoochee	Morris		
1989	Sundown: The Vampire in Retreat	Mort Bisby		
1989	Thunderground	Wedge		
1990	Narrow Margin	Sergeant Dominick Benti		
1992	The Naked Truth	Garcia / Gesundheim		
1992	Killer Image	John Kane		
1992	White Sands	Bert Gibson		
1992	Equinox	Pete Petosa		
1992	Four Eyes and Six Guns	Mayor Thornbush		
1993	Bitter Harvest	Sheriff Bob		
1993	The Music of Chance	Calvin Murks		
1993	Wilder Napalm	Fire Chief		
1994	Dead Badge	Sergeant Miller Hoskins		
1994	Relative Fear	Earl Ladelle		
1994	Camp Nowhere	T.R. Polk		
1994	The Glass Shield	Detective Jesse Hall		
1994	Cops & Robbersons	Captain Ted Corbett	Uncredited	
1995	Criminal Hearts	Martin		
1995	Free Willy 2: The Adventure Home	Wilcox		
1995	Panther	Dorsett		
1996	Portraits of a Killer	Raymond Garrison		
1996	Albino Alligator	Dino		
1996	A Time to Kill	Dr. Willard Tyrell Bass	Uncredited	
1996	William Shakespeare's Romeo + Juliet	Apothecary		
1997	The Killing Jar	Sheriff Foley		
1997	Retroactive	Sam		
1997	My Best Friend's Wedding	Joe O'Neal		
1998	Chairman of the Board	Freemont		
1998	Twilight	Lester Ivar		
1998	Erasable You	Ralph Worth		
1998	Nightmare in Big Sky Country	US Marshal Phillips		
1999	Wild Wild West	US Marshal Coleman, Train Engineer		
1999	The Iron Giant	Earl Stutz	Voice	
1999	Random Hearts	Billy	Uncredited	
1999	Me and Will	Dean		
1999	Jack of Hearts	Commissioner Menlo Boyce		
2000	Poor White Trash	Judge Pike		
2001	Eyeball Eddie	Coach Cook	Short film	
2001	Christmas in the Clouds	Stu O'Malley		
2002	Snow Dogs	George Murphy		
2003	Baggage	Sandy Westphall		
2004	Christmas with the Kranks	Walt Scheel		
2005	Greener Mountain	Muggs		
2005	Racing Stripes	Sheriff Woodzie		
2007	Man in the Chair	Mickey Hopkins		
2007	Big Stan	Lew Popper		
2008	Sherman's Way	Hoyt		
2008	Your Name Here	Kroger / Maurice Stanz		
2008	Haunted Echoes	Neil		
2009	Don McKay	Samuel		
2009	Sam Steele and the Junior Detective Agency	Chief Van Owen		
2009	Youth in Revolt	Mr. Saunders		
2010	Chasing 3000	Chuck Ireland		
2012	The Odd Life of Timothy Green	Uncle Bub		
2012	Arthur Newman	Zazek		
2012	Love Sick Love	Ed		
2014	Calvary	Gerald Ryan		
2015	Boiling Pot	Dean Marison		
2015	The Scorpion King 4: Quest for Power	Gorak		
2018	Shifting Gears	Hank		
2018	Change in the Air	Walter Lemke		
2019	Raising Buchanan	Larry Kiesling		
2019	Faith, Hope & Love	Father John		
2019	Knives Out	Mr. Proofroc		
2019	South of Bix	Grandpa	Short film	
2020	The Mimic	The Director		
2022	A Little White Lie	Professor Arthur Baldwin		
2022	Dotty & Soul	Harold Eichelbaum		
2022	The Immaculate Room	Harry Frith		
2024	Outlaw Posse	"Catfish"		
2024	Brothers	Judge Farful	Posthumous release	
2025	Green and Gold	Scotty	Posthumous release	

=== Television ===
Year	Title	Role	Notes	References
1968	The Doctors	Jason Randall	Soap opera	
1969	N.Y.P.D.	Freibisch	Episode: "Who's Got the Bundle?"	
1970	Arnie	Cliff	Episode: "To Buy or Not to Buy?"	
1971	Julia	Gus Anderson	2 episodes	
1971	All in the Family	Billy Hartfield	Episode: "The Saga of Cousin Oscar"	
1971	The Jimmy Stewart Show	Lionel Atkins	Episode: "Another Day, Another Scholar"	
1971	Ironside	Telegraph Clerk	Episode: "Dear Fran..."	
1971	Bonanza	Mattheson	Episode: "Warbonnet"	
1971–1972	Nichols	Gabe McCutcheon	5 episodes	
1972	The Don Rickles Show	Arthur Kingston	Episode #1.4	
1972	The Bob Newhart Show	Jack Hoover	Episode: "P-I-L-O-T"	
1972	The Sandy Duncan Show	Alex Lembeck	11 episodes	
1974	McMillan & Wife	Officer Ames	Episode: "Buried Alive"	
1974	Amy Prentiss	Tom	Episode: "Baptism of Fire"	
1975	The Rockford Files	Edgar Burch	Episode: "Counter Gambit"	
1975	Sarah T. – Portrait of a Teenage Alcoholic	Mr. Peterson	Television film	
1975	The Waltons	David Fletcher	Episode: "The Venture"	
1976	Gibbsville	Yostie	Episode: "Afternoon Waltz"	
1976–1978	Starsky and Hutch	Freddie / Lloyd Herman Eckworth	2 episodes	
1977	Mary Hartman, Mary Hartman	Officer Malloy	2 episodes	
1977	Red Alert	Sheriff Sweeney	Television film	
1978	Superdome	Whitley	Television film	
1978	James at 15	Coach Federson	Episode: "Queen of the Silver Dollar"	
1979	Dear Detective	Captain Gorcey	Episode: "Pilot"	
1979	No Other Love	DeFranco	Television film	
1979	The Gift	The Commander	Television film	
1980	City in Fear	Sheldon Lewis	Television film	
1980	Skag	Moran	Episode: "Pilot"	
1980	High Noon, Part II: The Return of Will Kane	Harold Patton	Television film	
1981	East of Eden	Sheriff Horace Quinn	3 episodes	
1981	Little House on the Prairie	Callahan	Episode: "Chicago"	
1983	ABC Afterschool Special	Joe Lempke	Episode: "The Woman Who Willed a Miracle"	
1983	Night Partners	Joe Kirby	Television film	
1984	The Outlaws	Warden MacDonald	Television film	
1985	ABC Weekend Special	Rocco	Episode: "The Adventures of Con Sawyer and Hucklemary Finn"	
1985	The Twilight Zone	Peter	Episode: "Dealer's Choice"	
1986	The Hitchhiker	Detective Underhill	Episode: "Ghostwriter"	
1986	The Right of the People	The Mayor	Television film	
1986	Resting Place	Sergeant "Sarge"	Television film	
1986	The Disney Sunday Movie	General Presser	Episode: "Hero in the Family"	
1986	The Deliberate Stranger	Detective Sam Davies	Television film	
1986	Amazing Stories	Grandpa	Episode: "Magic Saturday"	
1987	Broken Vows	Detective Mulligan	Television film	
1987	The Abduction of Kari Swenson	Don Nichols	Television film	
1987	Murder Ordained	Vern Humphrey	Miniseries	
1989	Brotherhood of the Rose	Hardy	2 episodes	
1989	Unsub	Ned Platt	8 episodes	
1989	Tales from the Crypt	Jonas	Episode: "Collection Completed"	
1990	True Betrayal	Clyde Wilson	Television film	
1990	The Civil War	Various Roles	Voice, 9 episodes	
1990	The Flash	Henry Allen	2 episodes	
1991	Deadly Identity	Harry	Television film	
1991	Silverfox	Charles Blankenship	Television film	
1992	Wild Card	Mose	Television film	
1993	The Jackie Thomas Show	Arlen Thomas	Episode: "Aloha, Io-wahu"	
1994	Home Improvement	Colonel Fred Patterson	2 episodes	
1994	Probable Cause	Sadler	Television film	
1995	From the Mixed-Up Files of Mrs. Basil E. Frankweiler	Morris	Television film	
1996	The Outer Limits	Sanford Vallé	Episode: "The Refuge"	
1996	Early Edition	Santa Claus	Episode: "Christmas"	
1998	Tracey Takes On...	Jimmy Duff	Episode: "Sports"	
1998	Men in White	Stanley Snyder	Television film	
1999	The X-Files	Arthur Dales	Episode: "The Unnatural"	
1999	The Wild Thornberrys	Gemsbok #1	Voice, episode: "Rain Dance"	
1999	Monster!	Lloyd	Television film	
1999–2001	Big Guy and Rusty the Boy Robot	Mack	Voice, 26 episodes	
2000	NYPD Blue	Dr. Joe Kroft	Episode: "Roll Out the Barrel"	
2000	Gideon's Crossing	Dr. George Matthews	Episode: "A Routine Case"	
2001	Night Visions	Gus	Episode: "Reunion"	
2001	The Mind of the Married Man	Randall Evans	5 episodes	
2001	Frasier	Rich Koechner	Episode: "Bully for Martin"	
2002	What's New, Scooby-Doo?	Jeb	Voice, episode: "Scooby-Doo Christmas"	
2003	Charlie Lawrence	"Cubby"	Episode: "New Kid in School"	
2003	Tracey Ullman in the Trailer Tales	Wally Westland	Television special	
2003	The Guardian	Ezra Pence	Episode: "Big Coal"	
2006	The X's	Stanley	Voice, episode: "In-Law Enforcement"	
2010	'Til Death	Uncle Rudolph	Episode: "Let's Go"	
2010–2013	Pound Puppies	Olaf	Voice, 46 episodes	
2012	Army Wives	Bernie Wallacheck	Episode: "Battle Scars"	
2012	Damages	Lyle Hewes	3 episodes	
2012–2015	Adventure Time	Cosmic Owl	Voice, 4 episodes	
2014	Tim and Eric's Bedtime Stories	Detective	Episode: "Toes"	
2019	Sneaky Pete	"Tex" Hopkins	7 episodes	
2019–2022	The Righteous Gemstones	Grandaddy Roy Gemstone	2 episodes	
2022	American Gigolo	Coleman	Episode: "Sunday Girl"	
