= Elbow River =

River in Alberta, Canada

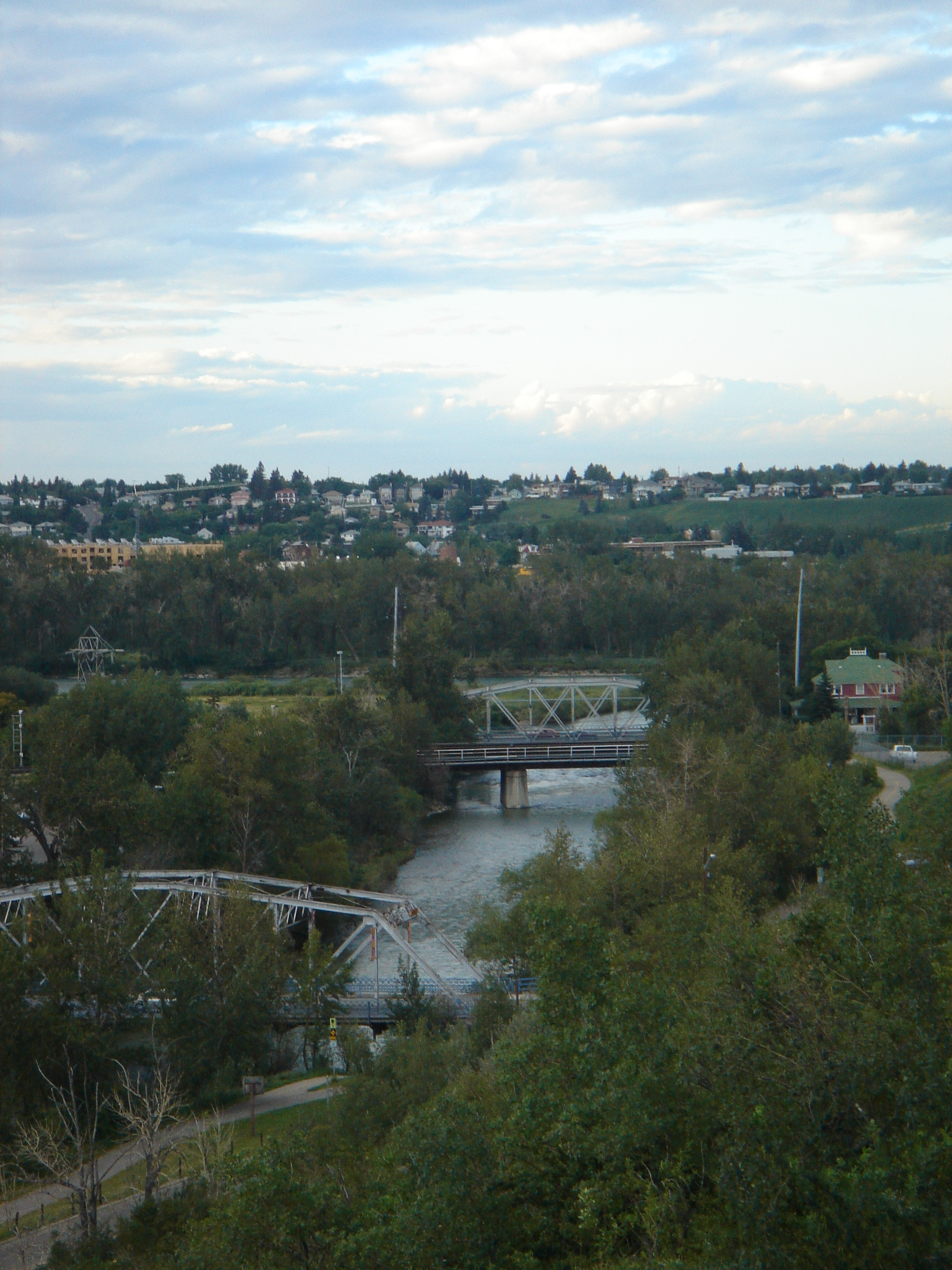
- Elbow River in Calgary

Location
- Country: Canada
- Province: Alberta

Physical characteristics
- Source
  - location: Elbow Lake, Elbow Pass, Kananaskis Improvement District
  - coordinates: 50.64219°N 115.00604°W
  - elevation: 2,100 m (6,900 ft)
- Mouth
  - location: Bow River
  - coordinates: 51.04519°N 114.04126°W
  - elevation: 1,040 m (3,410 ft)
- Length: 120 km (75 mi)
- Basin size: +1,200 km^{2} (460 sq mi)

The Elbow River is a river in southern Alberta, Canada. It flows from the Canadian Rockies to the city of Calgary, where it merges into the Bow River. Its name is derived from the elbow-like turn the river takes before it joins the Bow.

== Course ==
The Elbow River originates at Elbow Lake in the Front Range of the Canadian Rocky Mountains of southwestern Alberta draining a watershed of 1235 km^{2}. The river extends from a largely forested headwater region through alpine, sub-alpine, boreal foothills, and aspen parkland ecoregions, to a predominantly agricultural mid-region of improved pasture with dispersed cattle grazing and accompanying forage crop production, and thereafter through the city of Calgary under the influence of the urban environment.

The river has a total length of 120 kilometres (75 mi), and drains an area of over 1,200 square kilometres (460 sq mi). From its origin in the Elbow Pass at approximately 2,100 metres (6,900 ft), it drops 1,060 metres (3,480 ft) at a 1 percent slope to its mouth at the Bow River, at an elevation of 1,040 metres (3,410 ft).

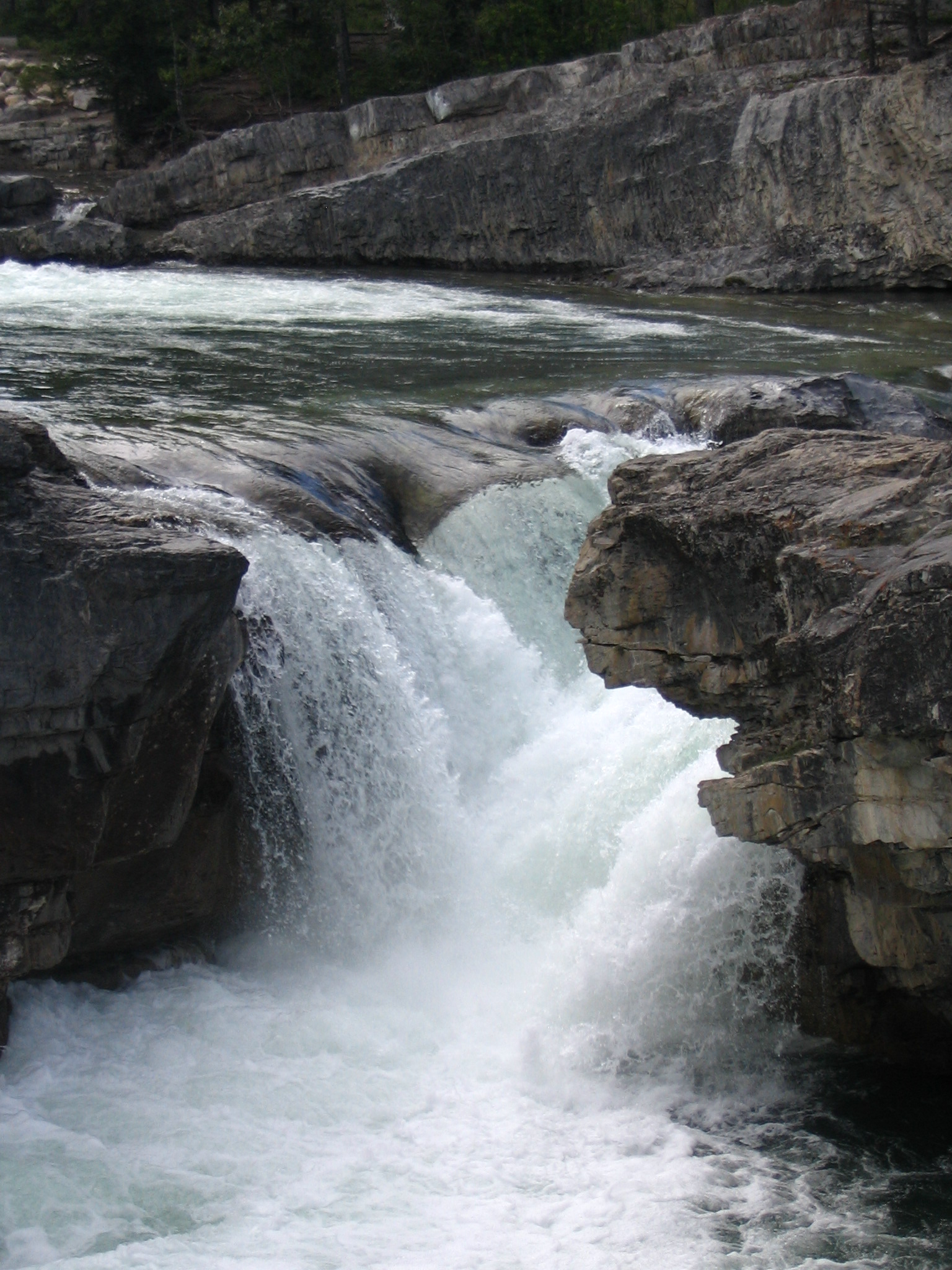
Elbow Falls on the upper course

The Elbow River originates from Elbow Lake in the Elbow-Sheep Wildland Provincial Park in the Canadian Rockies, then continues through the Rocky Mountain foothills and flows into the hamlet of Bragg Creek. The Elbow River passes under Highway 22 and then travels through the rural community of Springbank and the Tsuu T'ina Nation 145 Indian reserve directly west of Calgary. The river enters the City of Calgary at the Weaselhead Flats, an artificial inland delta, and into the Glenmore Reservoir, one of Calgary's two chief sources of drinking water. From there, it flows northward through residential communities towards the city centre, is crossed by Macleod Trail, passes the Calgary Stampede grounds and finally joins the Bow River west of the Wilder Institute/Calgary Zoo.

=== Tributaries ===
- Little Elbow River
- Quirk Creek
- Canyon Creek
- Iron Creek
- Bragg Creek
- Harris Creek
- Pirmez Creek
- Millburn Creek
- Springbank Creek
- Cullen Creek
- May Creek
- Lott Creek

== Flora and fauna ==
Dominant vegetation in the upper Elbow River drainage basin includes trembling aspen (Populus tremuloides), balsam poplar (P. balsamifera), lodgepole pine (Pinus contorta) and white spruce (Picea glauca). Soils in the Elbow watershed are primarily black chernozemics, orthic gray luvisols, eutric brunisols, and coarse loam overlying glaciofluvial gravels (Mitchell and Prepas 1990). Land use in the upper Elbow watershed is centered primarily on recreation, including camping, hiking, biking, equestrian, and some limited off-road vehicle activity. Logging, oil and gas production, and cattle grazing leases are also present.

== Human influence ==
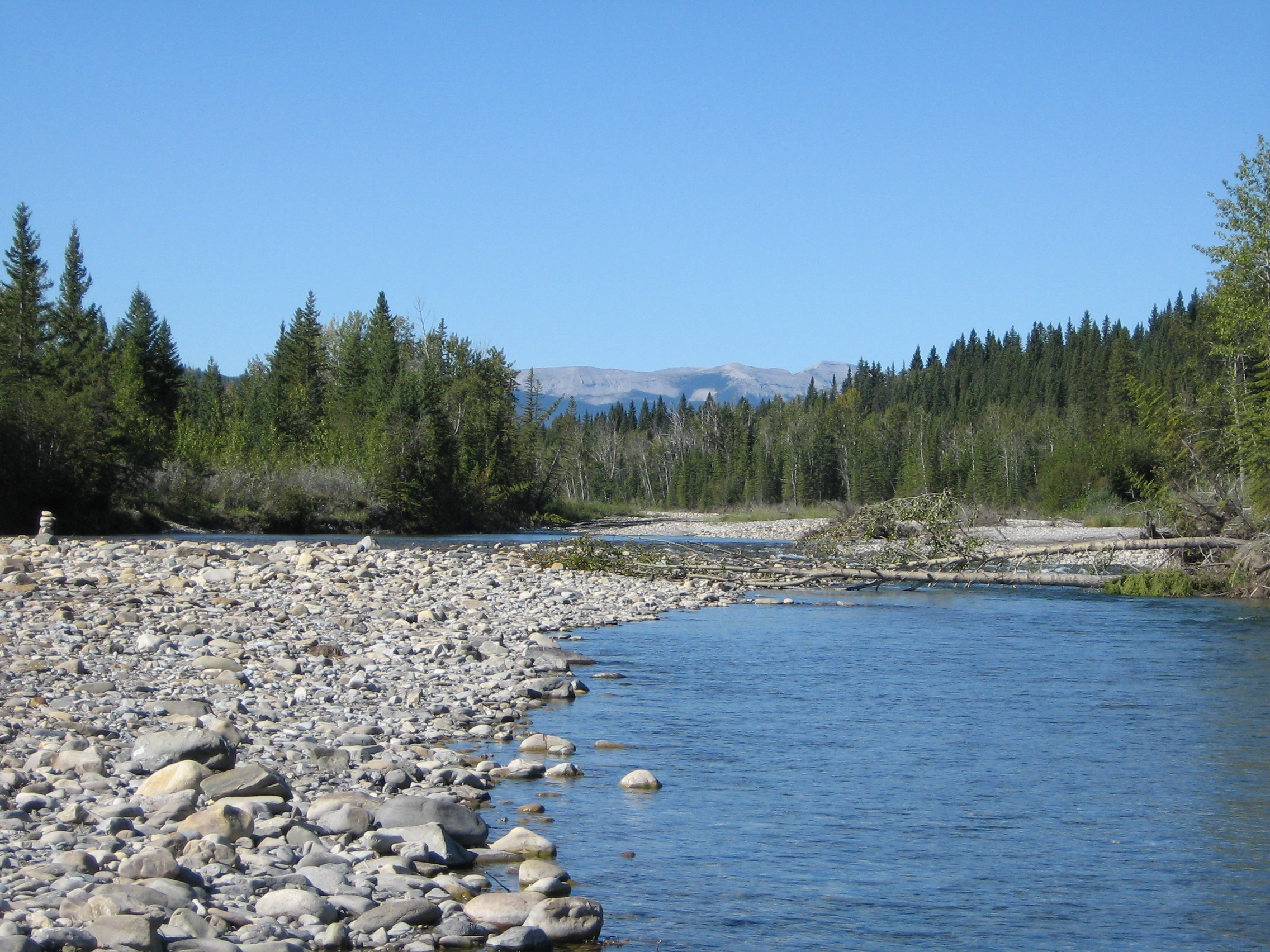
Elbow River at Redwood Meadows

Fort Calgary (the North-West Mounted Police post established in 1873 around which settlement in the Calgary area began) was located at the confluence of the Bow and Elbow rivers.

In terms of human influence, the Elbow River flows through the communities of Bragg Creek (population approx. 580) and Redwood Meadows (population approx. 980) in the foothills of the Rockies. Below these communities, the Elbow River flows through Tsuut’ina Nation 145 and country residential estates such as Elbow Valley. Closer to Calgary, the Elbow River flows through acreage lot development. The Elbow River enters the city of Calgary from the west, where it takes a very meandering path for approximately 14 kilometers before it is impounded to form the Glenmore Reservoir from which the Glenmore Water Treatment Plant receives its drinking water supply. Within the urban environment, the Elbow River flows approximately 11.5 kilometers downstream of the Glenmore Reservoir before joining the Bow River.

== Water quality ==
The Elbow River is the source of 40% of the drinking water for the City of Calgary (City of Calgary 2021), which has a current population of over 1.2 million (City of Calgary Census 2019). Within Calgary, there are nine stormwater outfalls draining urban catchments above the Glenmore Reservoir and 88 stormwater outfalls draining urban catchments between the reservoir and where the Elbow River joins the Bow River.

The Government of Alberta, Rocky View County, the University of Calgary and The City of Calgary have water quality sampling programs along the Elbow River, including occasional monitoring in a few tributaries. However, The City of Calgary has the best body of water quality data for the Elbow River. Historically, 17 sites in the Elbow River watershed were monitored at different times. These sites included tributaries to the Elbow River, the Elbow River mainstem and the Glenmore Reservoir. Currently, seven sites in the Elbow River mainstem and four sites in the Glenmore Reservoir are being actively monitored.

The Elbow River is popular among canoers, rafters, campers, and hikers and runs through several features including Forgetmenot Pond, and Elbow Falls. Sections of the river are closed to fishing or are "catch-and-release" waters.

== Floods ==
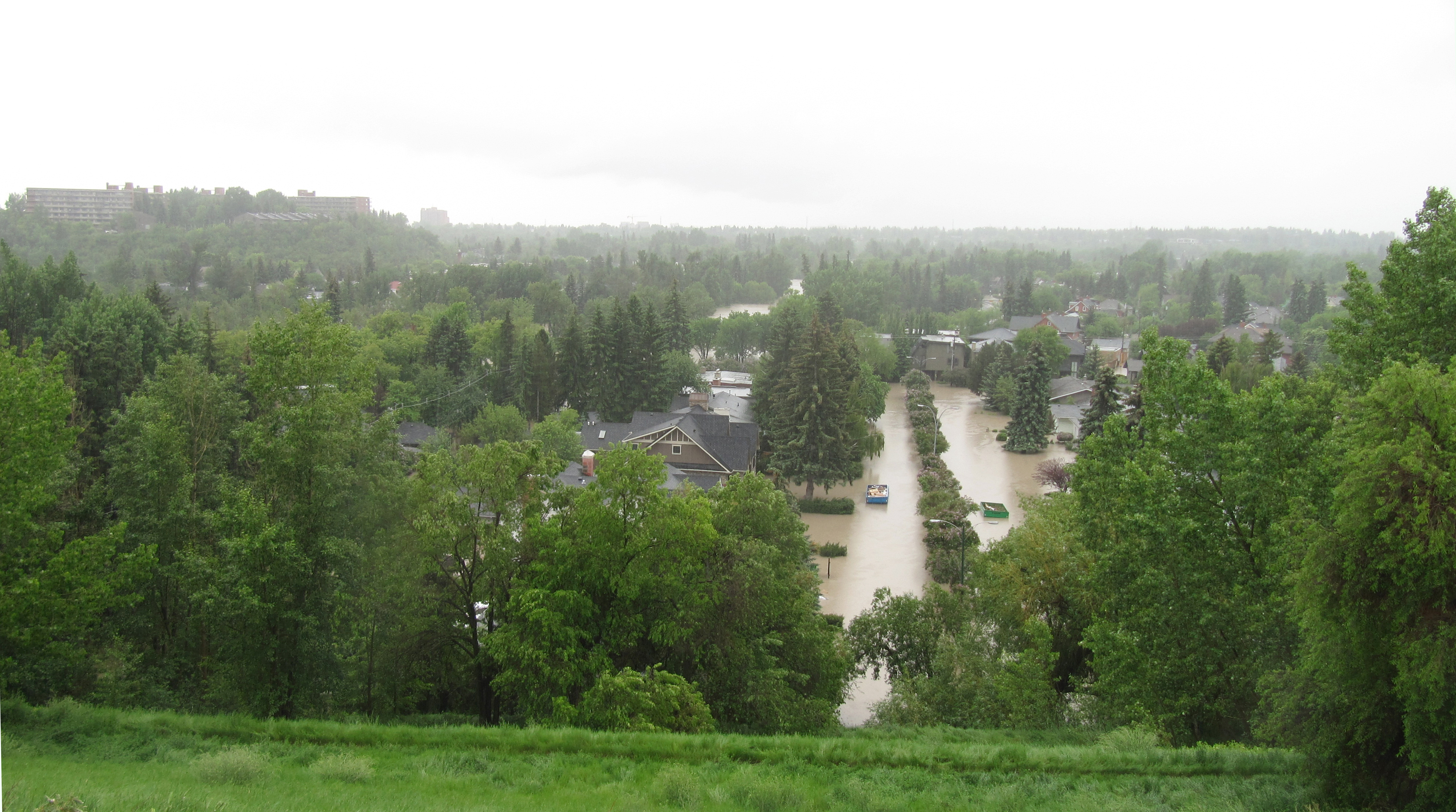
The Elbow River flooding the Elbow Park neighborhood in Calgary on 21 June 2013

The water flow of the Elbow River fluctuates significantly, and in June 2005 a flood occurred that was so severe (the heaviest in at least two centuries according to Alberta Government estimates) that the water flowed over the Glenmore Dam. Approximately 1,500 Calgarians living downstream were evacuated. Another, more extensive flood began on 20 June 2013, with tens of thousands of evacuations.

In June 2013, Alberta, Canada, experienced heavy rainfall that triggered catastrophic flooding throughout much of the southern half of the province along the Bow, Elbow, Highwood and Oldman rivers and tributaries. A dozen municipalities in Southern Alberta declared local states of emergency on 20 June as water levels rose and numerous communities were placed under evacuation orders.

== Gallery ==
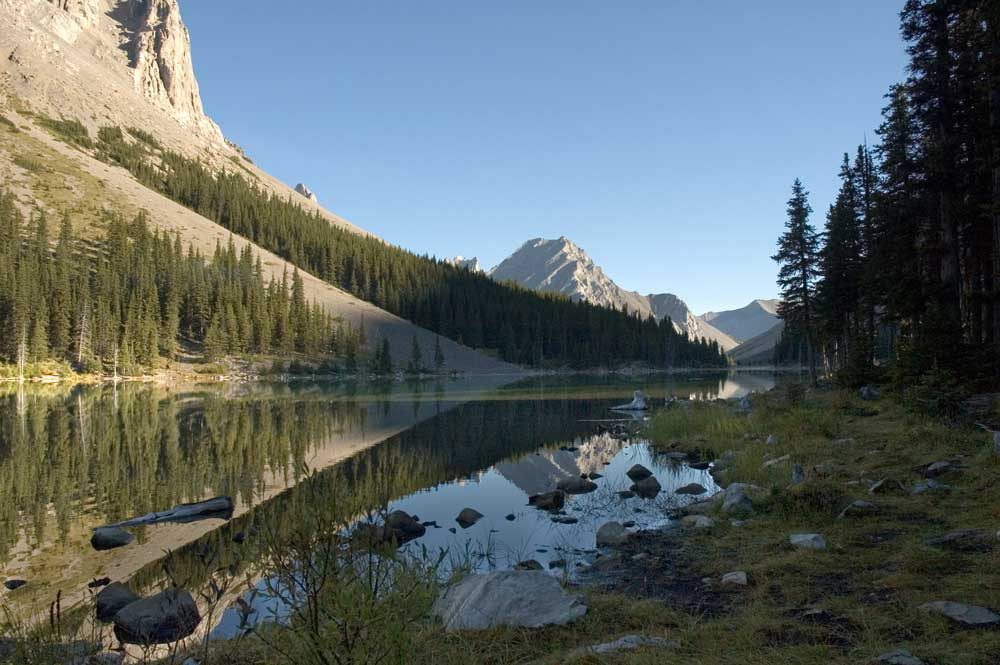
Elbow Lake

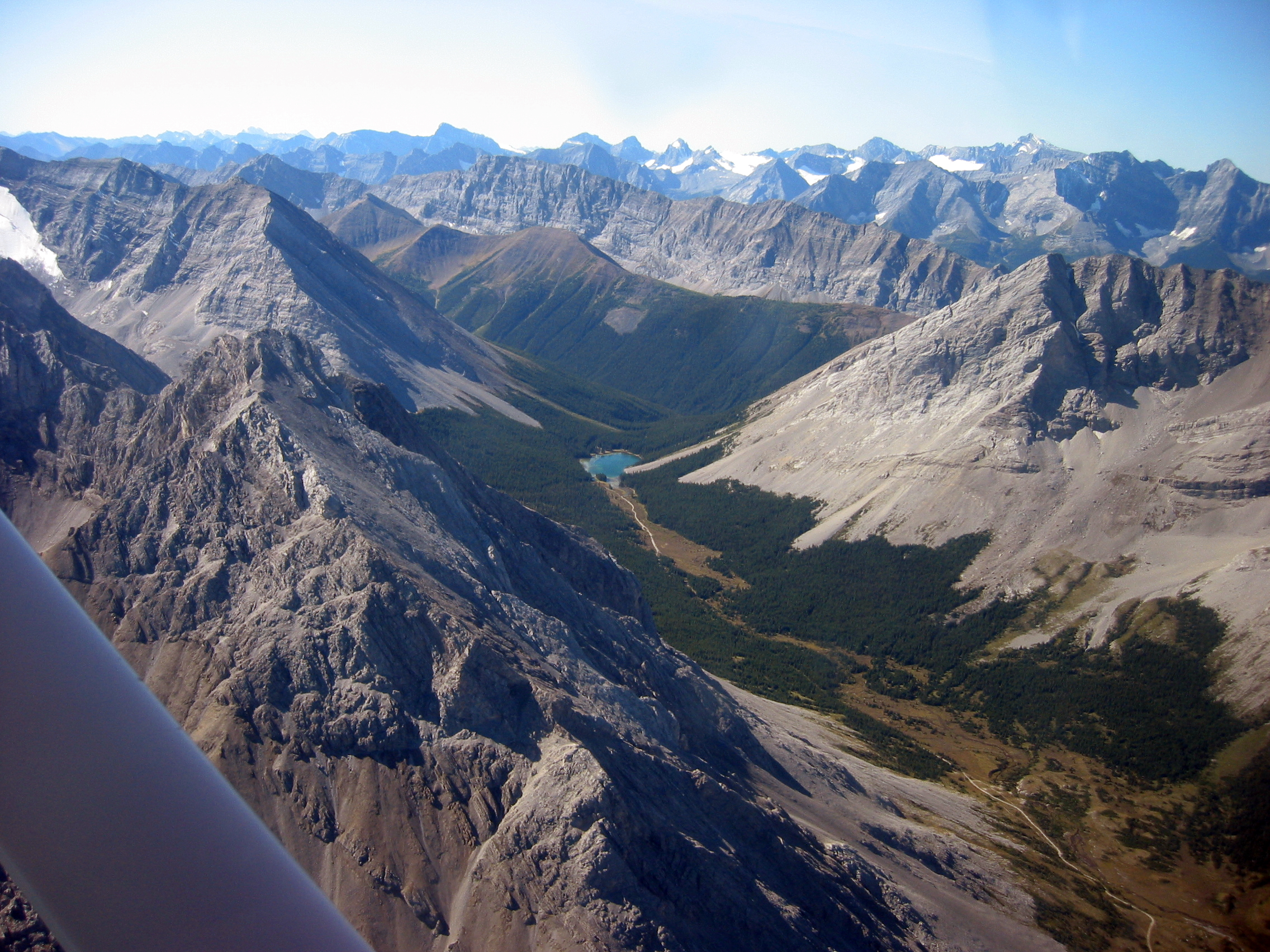
Upper course in the Elbow Pass

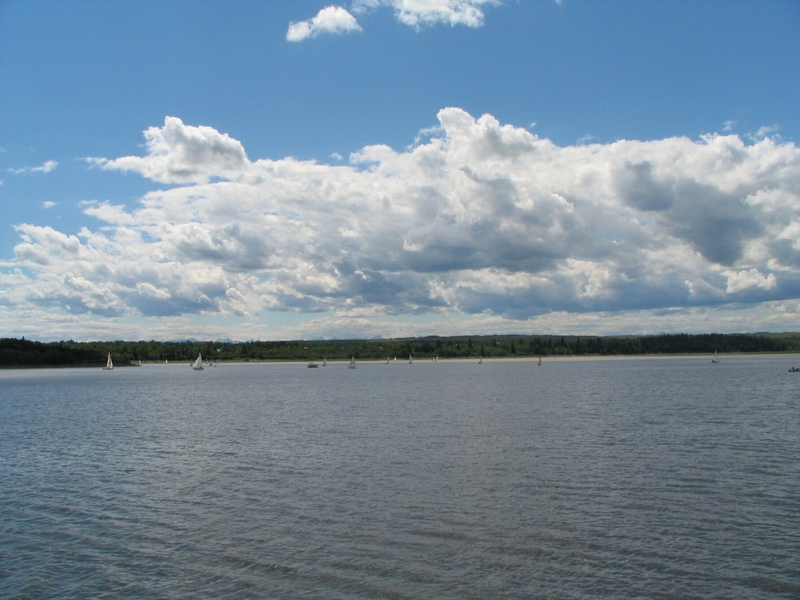
Glenmore Reservoir in Calgary

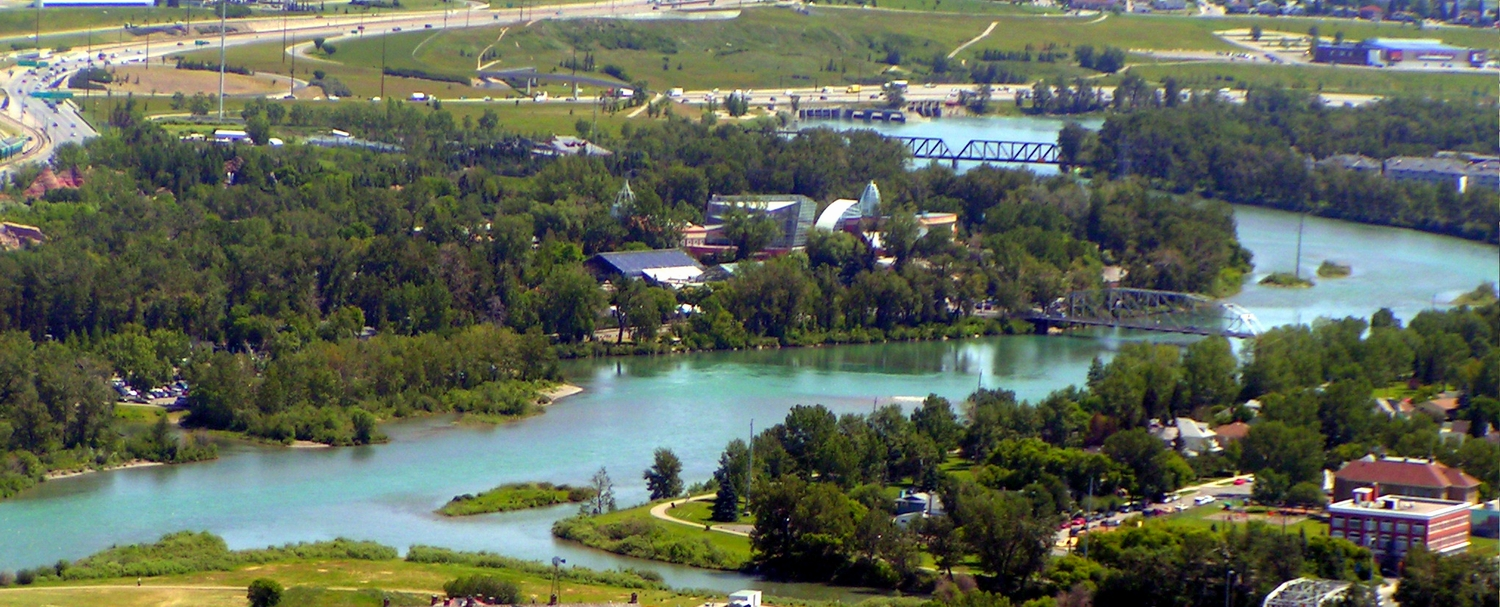
Confluence with Bow River

== See also ==
- List of rivers of Alberta
