= David Winning =

Canadian filmmaker

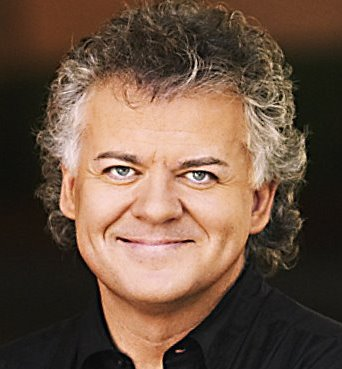
- Born: Calgary, Alberta, Canada
- Citizenship: United States, Canadian
- Occupations: Film director, producer, screenwriter, and actor
- Years active: 1976 – present
- Website: www.davidwinning.com

David Winning is a Canadian-American film and television director, screenwriter, producer, editor, and occasional actor. Although Winning has worked in numerous film and TV genres, his name is most commonly associated with science fiction, thrillers and drama.

== Life and career ==
Winning was born in Calgary, Alberta. He became a dual citizen of the US and Canada in 2003 and lives in Los Angeles. He was making films at age ten with a Super 8 camera. In 1979, he received a Canada Council grant to make the sixteen millimeter drama Sequence, and expanded the plotline into his first feature film Storm, filmed in the summer of 1983 in Bragg Creek, Alberta. It was shot with money that his father had set aside for film school and was screened at Cannes. It took four years to finish and was released by Golan-Globus' Cannon Films International and Warner Home Video in 1988. A December 11, 1989 Los Angeles Times review called the film "taut, ambitious and darkly comic".

At 27, he directed episodes of Friday the 13th: The Series for Paramount and received three Gemini Award nominations. His second feature Killer Image followed in 1992; the mystery-thriller starred Michael Ironside and M. Emmet Walsh. Throughout the 1990s and 2000s he directed 47 movies and episodes of twenty-nine series, including Stargate: Atlantis, ABC's Dinotopia filmed in Budapest, Nickelodeon’s Are You Afraid of the Dark?, and four seasons on Gene Roddenberry's Andromeda. He directed Kim Cattrall, Sean Young, and Eric McCormack in the award-winning thriller Exception to the Rule. His biggest budget studio movie to date is the $29-million kids sci-fi action sequel Turbo: A Power Rangers Movie for 20th Century Fox. He directed seven episodes of the Cannell police series Street Justice with Carl Weathers. Winning said "Episodic TV gets no respect" in a March 2000 Toronto Star interview. He directed a 16-year-old Ryan Gosling in the Pilot and seven episodes of the Paramount UPN kid series Breaker High.

According to the February 2010 Avatar issue of Sci Fi magazine, he was slated to direct the movie Sinbad: The Fifth Voyage with Patrick Stewart. He directed episodes of Space Channel's comedy/horror series Todd and the Book of Pure Evil and Lost Girl for SYFY Channel and Showcase—and supervised and directed the far north webisode series YUKONIC online in 2011. He is directing XIII: The Series with Stuart Townsend, produced by Roger Avary for French Canal +, and multiple episodes of the live audience multi-camera sitcom Mr. Young for The Disney Channel. In 2017 he became one of the house directors on the Netflix / SYFY channel series Van Helsing; an explosive post-apocalyptic take on the vampire rising based on a graphic novel. He also started directing over two dozen Christmas and family films for the Hallmark Channel; including A Summer Romance, Tulips in Spring, A December Bride, and Unleashing Mr. Darcy, which broke the network record on social media with 47 Million tweets.

== Awards ==
Winning has won the 1995 Gold Hugo Award and two Silver Plaques from the Chicago International Film Festival, and four national Gemini Award nominations for Best Director/Dramatic Series. In 2002 he accepted the first national team award from the Directors Guild of Canada Best TV series Drama for Twice in a Lifetime and was nominated again in 2006. His episode of Stargate: Atlantis, "Childhood’s End", won three awards for Directing; New York, Houston and Chicago in 2005. In April 2008, Winning won two Directing awards at the Houston Film Festival/WorldFest in Texas and a Special Jury Award for his work on the Lifetime Television vampire series Blood Ties.

Winning's Film Field Day won Best Ensemble Cast at the Marina del Rey Film Festival in 2024.

== 2008 Hawaii Career Award and festival screenings ==
Winning was honored at the 2008 Big Island Film Festival in Hawaii. He received a Special Career award on May 17, 2008 with a reception in his honor in Waikōloa Village. Swamp Devil also won the Golden Honu for Best Foreign feature film. A double bill of his two monster movies was presented at the outdoor festival; Swamp Devil starring Bruce Dern and Black Swarm starring Robert Englund. The first in his trilogy was Something Beneath with Kevin Sorbo in 2007. Black Swarm also screened at the Boston Film Festival on Friday the 13th of June, 2008. Both films were produced in Montreal by Muse Entertainment for the SYFY Channel, New York City.

== Filmography ==
=== Film ===
Year	Title	Director	Producer	Writer	Notes
1987	Storm	check	check	check	
1992	Killer Image	check	check	check	
1996	Profile for Murder	check			
1997	Exception to the Rule	check			
1997	Turbo: A Power Rangers Movie	check			
1998	One of Our Own	check			
2009	Swamp Devil	check			
2014	The Town That Came A-Courtin’	check			
2014	Mutant World	check			

=== Television films and series ===
Year	Title	Director	Producer	Notes
1989-1990	Friday the 13th: The Series	check		3 episodes: aka Friday's Curse
1992	Neon Rider	check		Episode: "Straight Home"
1992-1993	Street Justice	check		7 episodes
1993-1995	Are You Afraid of the Dark?	check		10 Episodes
1993	Matrix	check		Episode: "False Witness"
1995-1997	Sweet Valley High	check		11 episodes
1996	Goosebumps	check		Episode: "... It Came From Beneath the Sink"
1997	Dead Man's Gun	check		Episode: "The Black Widow"
1997	Breaker High	check		7 episodes
1998	Night Man	check		3 episodes
1998	Merlin: The Quest Begins	check		Television film
1999-2001	Twice in a Lifetime	check		11 episodes
1999	Don’t Look Behind You	check		Television film
2000	Call of The Wild	check		Episode: "Molly Brown"
2000-2005	Gene Roddenberry's Andromeda	check		10 episodes
2001-2002	Gene Roddenberry's Earth Final Conflict	check		7 episodes
2002-2003	Dinotopia	check		4 episodes
2002	Body & Soul	check		Episode: "Saviors"
2002	He Sees You When You're Sleeping	check		Television film
2004	Stargate: Atlantis	check		Episode: "Childhood's End"
2006-2007	Naturally, Sadie	check		4 episodes
2006	Past Sins	check		Television film
2007	Blood Ties	check		4 episodes
2007	Dinosapien	check		4 episodes
2007	Something Beneath	check		Television film
2008	Black Swarm	check		Television film
2010-2012	Todd and the Book of Pure Evil	check		4 episodes
2012	Lost Girl	check		Episode: "Midnight Lamp"
2012	XIII: The Series	check		Episodes: "Gauntlet"; "Pong"
2012-2013	Mr. Young	check		3 episodes
2013	Health Nutz	check		Episodes: "Juice, Jesus and Rock & Roll"; "Hypno Yoga"
2014-2015	The Stanley Dynamic	check		4 episodes
2014-2015	Max and Shred	check		Episodes: "The Boardercross Bionic Boost"; "The Goofy Tamedog Air"
2014	The Tree That Saved Christmas	check		Television film
2014	Paper Angels	check	check	Television film Co-executive Producer
2015	The Magic Stocking	check		Television film
2016	Cradle of Lies	check		Television film: aka Where's My Baby?
2016	Under Fire	check		Television film: aka Who Killed My Husband?
2016	Unleashing Mr. Darcy	check		Television film
2016	The Rooftop Christmas Tree	check	check	Television film Executive Producer
2016	The Convenient Groom	check		Television film
2016	Tulips In Spring	check		Television film
2016	A December Bride	check		Television film
2016	The Mistletoe Promise	check	check	Television film Executive Producer
2017	Infidelity in Suburbia	check	check	Television film Executive Producer
2017	While You Were Dating	check		Television film
2017	Engaging Father Christmas	check		Television film: aka A Family for the Holidays (Canada); Winter Wedding (UK)
2017	Falling For Vermont	check		Television film
2017	Finding Santa	check		Television film
2017	Van Helsing	check		6 episodes
2018	Winter's Dream	check		Television film
2018	Marrying Father Christmas	check		Television film: aka. Winter Wedding (Canada) (post-production)
2018	Time for Me to Come Home for Christmas	check		Television film
2019	A Summer Romance	check		Television film
2019	Sense, Sensibility & Snowmen	check		Television film
2019	A Blue Ridge Mountain Christmas	check		Television film
2020	Time For Us to Come Home for Christmas	check		Television film
2021	Crossword Mysteries: Riddle Me Dead	check	check	Television film Supervising Producer
2021	The 27-Hour Day	check		Television film
2021	You, Me and The Christmas Trees	check		Television film
2021	The Nine Kittens of Christmas	check		Television film
2022	Time For Him to Come Home for Christmas	check		Television film
2023	Field Day	check		Television film
2023	A Christmas Blessing	check	check	Television film Executive Producer
2024	Curious Caterer: Forbidden Fruit	check		Television film
