= Airdrie-Chestermere =

Defunct provincial electoral district in Alberta, Canada

Coordinates: 51.176°N 113.808°W

Alberta electoral district
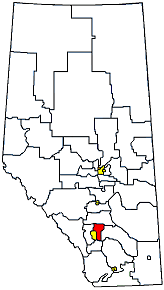
- 2004 boundaries

Defunct provincial electoral district
- Legislature: Legislative Assembly of Alberta
- District created: 2003
- District abolished: 2012
- First contested: 2004
- Last contested: 2008

Airdrie-Chestermere was a provincial electoral district in Alberta, Canada, mandated to return a single member to the Legislative Assembly of Alberta using the first-past-the-post method of voting from 2004 to 2012.

== History ==
The district was located to the east of Calgary in southern Alberta. It was created in the 2003 electoral boundary re-distribution from the old riding of Airdrie-Rocky View. The riding has an urban rural mix. It was named after the cities of Airdrie and Chestermere. The riding also covered Crossfield and the eastern half of Rocky View County as well as border areas of Calgary that have grown beyond into the district.

The voters in the district and its antecedents primarily supported Progressive Conservative candidates in the past, but other right leaning parties polled well. The first representative was Progressive Conservative Carol Haley who had previously represented Airdrie-Rocky View, and the second was Rob Anderson who was elected as a Progressive Conservative in 2008 but crossed the floor to the Wildrose Alliance in early 2010.

The riding was abolished in the 2010 Alberta boundary re-distribution prior to the 2012 Alberta general election. The territory of the Aridrie-Chestermere district was divided amongst three new electoral districts, the northeast portion including Beiseker and Irricana was transferred to Olds-Didsbury-Three Hills electoral district, the territory covering the City of Airdrie and surrounding rural lands to the Airdrie electoral district, and the remainder to the Chestermere-Rocky View electoral district.

=== Boundary history ===
43 Airdrie-Chestermere 2003 boundaries
Bordering districts
| North | East | West | South |
|---|---|---|---|
| Olds-Didsbury-Three Hills | Strathmore-Brooks | Calgary-Cross, Calgary-Fort, Calgary-Hays Calgary-McCall, Calgary-Mackay, Calgary-Montrose, Foothills-Rocky View | Highwood |
| riding map goes here | | Airdrie-Chestermere | |
Legal description from the Statutes of Alberta 2003, Electoral Divisions Act
Starting at the intersection of the north boundary of Sec. 13 in Twp. 29, Rge. 1 W5 and the centre line of Highway 2; then 1. east along the north boundary of Sec. 13 in the Twp. and the north boundary of Sec. 15, 14 and 13 in Twp. 29, Rge. 29 W4 and the north boundary of Secs. 18 and 17 in Twp. 29, Rge. 28 W4 to the east boundary of Sec. 17 in the Twp.; 2. south along the east boundary of Secs. 17 and 8 to the north boundary of Sec. 4 in the Twp.; 3. east along the north boundary of Secs. 4, 3, 2 and 1 in the Twp. to the east boundary of Rge. 28 W4; 4. south along the east boundary to the north boundary of Twp. 28; 5. east along the north boundary to the east boundary of Rge. 25 W4; 6. south along the east boundary to the north boundary of Twp. 26; 7. east along the north boundary to the east boundary of Sec. 35 in Twp. 26, Rge. 25 W4; 8. south along the east boundary of Secs. 35 and 26 in the Twp. to the north boundary of Sec. 23 in the Twp.; 9. west along the north boundary of Secs. 23, 22, 21, 20 and 19 in the Twp. to the east boundary of Rge. 26 W4; 10. south along the east boundary to the north boundary of Twp. 25; 11. west along the north boundary to the east boundary of Sec. 32 in Twp. 25, Rge. 26 W4; 12. south along the east boundary of Secs. 32 and 29 in the Twp. to the north boundary of Sec. 20 in the Twp.; 13. west along the north boundary of Sec. 20 to the east boundary of Sec. 19 in the Twp.; 14. south along the east boundary of Secs. 19 and 18 in the Twp. to the north boundary of Sec. 7 in the Twp.; 15. west along the north boundary to the east boundary of Rge. 27; 16. south along the east boundary of Rge. 27 to the right bank of the Bow River; 17. upstream along the right bank of the Bow River to the southerly extension of 88 Street SE in the City of Calgary; 18. north along the extension of 88 Street SE to the east Calgary city boundary; 19. north and west along the east city boundary to its intersection with the centre line of Highway 2; 20. north along the centre line of Highway 2 to the north boundary of Sec. 12 in Twp. 26, Rge. 1 W5 (Highway 566); 21. west along the north boundary of Secs. 12, 11 and 10 to the east boundary of Sec. 16 in the Twp.; 22. north along the east boundary of Secs. 16, 21, 28 and 33 in Twp. 26 and Secs. 4, 9, 16 and 21 in Twp. 27 to the north boundary of Sec. 22 in Twp. 27, Rge. 1 W5; 23. east along the north boundary of Secs. 22, 23 and 24 to the centre line of Highway 2; 24. north along Highway 2 to the starting point.
Note:

Members of the Legislative Assembly for Airdrie-Chestermere
| Assembly | Years | Member | Party |
|---|---|---|---|
See Airdrie-Rocky View 1997-2004
| 26th | 2004-2008 | Carol Haley | Progressive Conservative |
| 27th | 2008-2010 | Rob Anderson | Progressive Conservative |
| 27th | 2010-2011 | Rob Anderson | Wildrose Alliance |
| 27th | 2011–2012 | Rob Anderson | Wildrose |
See Airdrie and Chestermere-Rocky View 2012-2019

=== Electoral history ===
The electoral district was created in the 2004 boundary redistribution. The first election held that year saw Progressive Conservative incumbent Carol Haley who had previously represented the old ridings of Three Hills-Airdrie and Airdrie-Rocky View win the seat with a landslide over a crowded field of seven other candidates. She retired from office at dissolution in 2008.

The 2008 election saw Progressive Conservative candidate Rob Anderson sweep to office. He crossed the floor to the Wildrose Alliance on January 4, 2010, citing dissatisfaction with the Progressive Conservative government and Premier Ed Stelmach.

== Legislative election results ==
=== 2004 ===
2004 Alberta general election
| Party | Candidate | Votes | % | ±% |
|---|---|---|---|---|
| Progressive Conservative | Carol Louise Haley | 6,842 | 57.77% | – |
| Liberal | John Burke | 1,633 | 13.79% | – |
| Alberta Party | Jeff Willerton | 1,036 | 8.75% | – |
| Alberta Alliance | Bradley Gaida | 758 | 6.40% | – |
| New Democratic | Grant Massie | 569 | 4.80% | – |
| Greens | Angela Scully | 434 | 3.66% | – |
| Separation | Bob Lefurgey | 394 | 3.33% | – |
| Social Credit | Jerry Gautreau | 178 | 1.50% | – |
| Total | | 11,844 | – | – |
| Rejected, spoiled and declined | | 44 | – | – |
| Eligible electors / turnout | | 30,096 | 39.50% | – |
| Progressive Conservative pickup new district. | | | | |
Source(s) Source: "Airdrie-Chestermere Statement of Official Results 2004 Alberta general election" (PDF). Elections Alberta.

=== 2008 ===
2008 Alberta general election
| Party | Candidate | Votes | % | ±% |
|---|---|---|---|---|
| Progressive Conservative | Rob Anderson | 9,374 | 62.59% | 4.82% |
| Wildrose | Jeff Willerton | 2,362 | 15.77% | – |
| Liberal | John Burke | 1,973 | 13.17% | -0.61% |
| Green | David Brandreth | 660 | 4.41% | 0.75% |
| New Democratic | Bryan Young | 609 | 4.07% | -0.74% |
| Total | | 14,978 | – | – |
| Rejected, spoiled and declined | | 21 | – | – |
| Eligible electors / turnout | | 38,989 | 38.47% | -1.03% |
| Progressive Conservative hold | | Swing | | 1.42% |
Source(s) Source: "Airdrie-Chestermere Official Results 2008 Alberta general election". officialresults.elections.ab.ca. Elections Alberta. The Report on the March 3, 2008 Provincial General Election of the Twenty-seventh Legislative Assembly. Elections Alberta. July 28, 2008. pp. 346–351.

== Senate nominee election results ==
=== 2004 ===
| 2004 Senate nominee election results: Airdrie-Chestermere | | | | Turnout 37.53% | |
| Affiliation | Candidate | Votes | % votes | % ballots | Rank |
| Progressive Conservative | Bert Brown | 5,846 | 19.10% | 56.57% | 1 |
| Progressive Conservative | Betty Unger | 3,918 | 12.80% | 37.91% | 2 |
| Progressive Conservative | Jim Silye | 3,739 | 12.22% | 36.18% | 5 |
| Progressive Conservative | Cliff Breitkreuz | 3,321 | 10.85% | 32.14% | 3 |
| Alberta Alliance | Vance Gough | 3,260 | 10.65% | 31.55% | 8 |
| Progressive Conservative | David Usherwood | 2,899 | 9.47% | 28.05% | 6 |
| Independent | Link Byfield | 2,598 | 8.49% | 25.14% | 4 |
| Alberta Alliance | Michael Roth | 1,849 | 6.04% | 17.89% | 7 |
| Alberta Alliance | Gary Horan | 1,703 | 5.57% | 16.48% | 10 |
| Independent | Tom Sindlinger | 1,470 | 4.81% | 14.23% | 9 |
| Total votes | | 30,603 | 100% | | |
| Total ballots | | 10,334 | 2.96 votes per ballot | | |
| Rejected, spoiled and declined | | 962 | | | |

Voters had the option of selecting four candidates on the ballot.

== 2004 student vote results ==
Participating schools
Bert Church High School
Chestermere High School
Ecole Airdrie Middle School
George McDougall High School
Meadowbrook Middle School
Muriel Clayton Middle School
Our Lady Queen of Peace

On November 19, 2004, a student vote was conducted at participating Alberta schools to parallel the 2004 Alberta general election results. The vote was designed to educate students and simulate the electoral process for persons who had not yet reached the legal majority. The vote was conducted in 80 of the 83 provincial electoral districts, with students voting for actual election candidates. Schools with a large student body who resided in another electoral district had the option to vote for candidates outside of the electoral district than where they were physically located.

2004 Alberta student vote results
| Affiliation | Candidate | Votes | % |
| Progressive Conservative | Carol Haley | 652 | 39.16% |
| Green | Angela Scully | 308 | 18.50% |
| New Democratic | Grant Massie | 186 | 11.17% |
| Liberal | John Burke | 175 | 10.51% |
| Separation | Bob Lefurgey | 137 | 8.23% |
| Alberta Alliance | Bradley Gaida | 85 | 5.11% |
| Alberta Party | Jeff Willerton | 77 | 4.62% |
| Social Credit | Jerry Gautreau | 45 | 2.70% |
| Total | | 1,665 | 100% |
| Rejected, spoiled and declined | | 53 | |

== See also ==
- List of Alberta provincial electoral districts
- Canadian provincial electoral districts
