= Carol Louise Haley =

Canadian politician

Carol Haley

MLA for Three Hills-Airdrie
- In office 1993–1997
- Preceded by: New District
- Succeeded by: District Abolished

MLA for Airdrie-Rocky View
- In office 1997–2004
- Preceded by: New District
- Succeeded by: District Abolished

MLA for Airdrie-Chestermere
- In office 2004–2008
- Preceded by: New District
- Succeeded by: Rob Anderson

Personal details
- Born: September 18, 1951 (age 74) Edmonton, Alberta
- Party: Progressive Conservative

Carol Louise Haley is a provincial level politician from Alberta, Canada. She served as a member of the Legislative Assembly of Alberta from 1993 to 2008.

== Political career ==
Haley was first elected to the Alberta Legislature in the 1993 Alberta general election. She defeated Liberal incumbent Don MacDonald to win the new electoral district of Three Hills-Airdrie for the Progressive Conservatives.

Three Hills-Airidie was abolished due to redistribution for the 1997 Alberta general election. She ran for re-election in the new electoral district of Airdrie-Rocky View. Haley defeated three other candidates with a super majority. She ran for a third term in office in the 2001 Alberta general election. She won with the largest win of her political career topping 70% of the popular vote.

Airdrie-Rocky View was abolished due to redistribution in 2004, she ran for her last term in office in the Airdrie-Chestermere electoral district. In that election Haley faced six other candidates. She won the new district with a landslide, but her plurality was greatly reduced from her win in 2001. She did not seek re-election in the 2008 election.
