= Michael Clark (Canadian politician) =

Canadian politician

Member of Parliament for Red Deer
- In office 1908–1921
- Preceded by: new district
- Succeeded by: Alfred Speakman

Personal details
- Born: May 12, 1861 Belford, Northumberland, England
- Died: July 29, 1926 (aged 65) Olds, Alberta, Canada
- Party: Liberal Party of Canada, Unionist
- Occupation: Physician

Michael Clark (May 12, 1861 – July 29, 1926) was a Canadian physician and politician from Alberta, Canada.

== Early life ==
He was born in Belford, Northumberland, England. He was a physician in England. He immigrated to Canada in 1902, settling in Olds, Alberta. He homesteaded because he was not allowed to practice medicine in Canada. He then became involved in politics.

== Political career ==
Clark ran as a Liberal candidate in the Rosebud electoral district in Alberta's first provincial election, in 1905. He lost to Conservative candidate Cornelius Hiebert.

Clark ran for a seat to the House of Commons of Canada in the 1908 Canadian federal election in the Red Deer district as a candidate of the Liberal Party. He defeated Conservative candidate George Root to win in the new riding. Clark held that seat for the next 13 years and achieved recognition as a powerful orator. He acquired the nickname "Red Michael."

Clark ran for his second term in office in the 1911 Canadian federal election. He defeated Conservative challenger and future Member of the Legislative Assembly (MLA) Alexander McGillivray.

Clark joined the board of directors for the University of Alberta in 1911 and served in that position for a year.

In 1917, he ran for another term in office, this time as a supporter of the Unionist government. He was successful, defeating former Alberta MLA William Puffer. Clark joined the Progressive Party of Canada in 1920 but returned to the Liberals just a year later due to his opposition to class-based politics practised by the United Farmers of Alberta.

He ran for the Liberals in the Mackenzie electoral district in Saskatchewan in the 1921 Canadian federal election but was defeated by Progressive candidate Milton Neil Campbell.
