= James Lawrence Owens =

Canadian politician

Member of the Legislative Assembly of Alberta
- In office June 29, 1955 – September 28, 1960
- Preceded by: Howard Hammell
- Succeeded by: Robert Clark
- Constituency: Didsbury

Personal details
- Born: December 30, 1899 Nebraska, U.S.
- Died: September 27, 1960 (aged 60) Calgary, Alberta
- Party: Social Credit
- Occupation: politician

James Lawrence Owens (December 30, 1899 – September 27, 1960) was a politician from Alberta, Canada. He served in the Legislative Assembly of Alberta from 1955 until his death in 1960 as a member of the Social Credit caucus in government.

== Political career ==
Owens first ran for a seat to the Alberta Legislature in the 1955 general election as a Social Credit candidate in the electoral district of Didsbury. He defeated Coalition candidate Ben Brown by a few hundred votes.

In the 1959 general election, Owens defeated Progressive Conservative candidate Douglas Munn and a Liberal candidate.

Owens died of a heart attack on September 28, 1960, while still in office.
