= Cornelius Hiebert =

Canadian politician

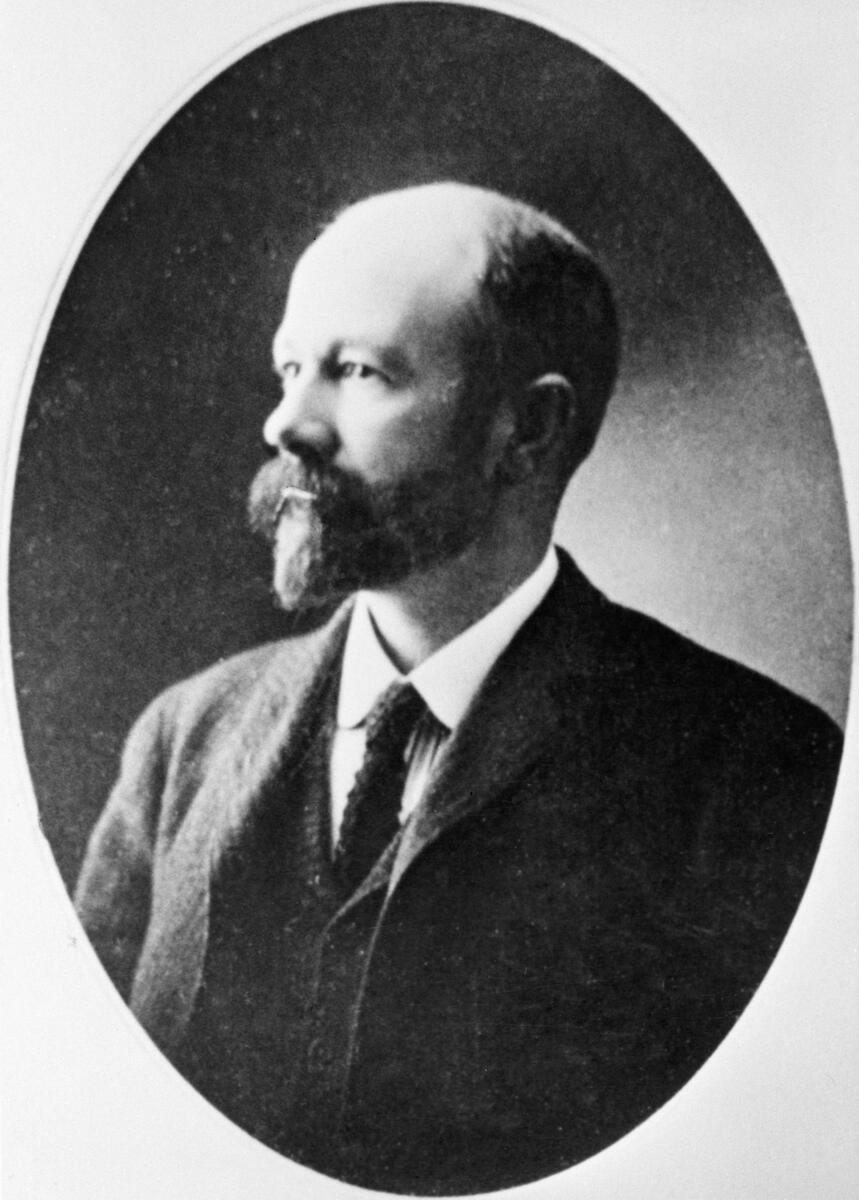

Member of the Legislative Assembly of Alberta for Rosebud
- In office 1905–1909

Personal details
- Born: August 2, 1862 Sea of Azov, Russia
- Died: March 21, 1919 (aged 56) Didsbury, Alberta, Canada
- Party: Conservative
- Occupation: Businessman

Cornelius "Don" Hiebert (August 2, 1862 – March 21, 1919) was a Russia-born Canadian politician from Alberta.

== Early life ==
Hiebert was born in Sea of Azov, Russia and lived in Russia and attended school until he was 13 years old, when his family moved to Manitoba, Canada. He worked in a little general store until he decided to move to Didsbury, Alberta in 1900. When he arrived to the new town he founded a small general and hardware store.

Hiebert began his political career on the municipal level. He was elected to serve as Village Overseer, the precursor to the Mayoral position for Didsbury from 1901 to 1904. After his 3 years managing the affairs of Didsbury he became more ambitious and ran for a seat in the provincial legislature.

== Provincial political career ==
Hiebert was elected to the Legislative Assembly of Alberta in the 1905 Alberta general election defeating future Member of Parliament Michael Clark in a hotly contested 3 way race. He was just one 1 out of 2 Conservatives elected to serve in the official opposition that year. Hiebert became the first Mennonite elected to the Alberta Legislature.

His electoral district was eliminated due re-distribution in the 1909 Alberta general election. He was unable to obtain the Conservative nomination at the party's provincial convention in Red Deer that year.

Despite losing the Conservative nomination, Hiebert tried running in the provincial election to retain his seat in the new Didsbury electoral district. He was defeated by Joseph Stauffer and ended up finishing the election in third place and losing his nomination deposit.

After Hiebert was defeated from the Legislature, the Calgary Herald wrote in a scathing editorial that his wavering from Conservatism was spineless, and that even his adherent supporters now despise him.

Legislative Assembly of Alberta
Preceded by New District	MLA Rosebud; 1905–1909	Succeeded by District Abolished
