= Olds-Didsbury =

Defunct provincial electoral district in Alberta, Canada

Coordinates: 51.724°N 114.121°W

Alberta electoral district

Defunct provincial electoral district
- Legislature: Legislative Assembly of Alberta
- District created: 1961
- District abolished: 1997
- First contested: 1963
- Last contested: 1993

Olds-Didsbury was a provincial electoral district in central Alberta, Canada, mandated to return a single member to the Legislative Assembly of Alberta using the first-past-the-post method of voting from 1963 to 1997.

It is noteworthy as the location of a famous by-election in 1982, when the separatist Western Canada Concept achieved the first and only electoral victory in the movement's history.

== History ==
Members of the Legislative Assembly for Olds-Didsbury
Assembly	Years	Member	Party
See Olds and Didsbury 1909–1963
15th	1963–1967	Robert Clark	Social Credit
16th	1967–1971	Robert Clark	Social Credit
17th	1971–1975	Robert Clark	Social Credit
18th	1975–1979	Robert Clark	Social Credit
19th	1979–1981	Robert Clark	Social Credit
19th	1981–1982	Vacant	
19th	1982	Gordon Kesler	Western Canada Concept
20th	1982–1986	Stephen Stiles	Progressive Conservative
21st	1986–1989	Roy Brassard	Progressive Conservative
22nd	1989–1993	Roy Brassard	Progressive Conservative
23rd	1993–1997	Roy Brassard	Progressive Conservative
See Olds-Didsbury-Three Hills 1997–, Rocky Mountain House and Airdrie-Rocky View

The riding was created in 1963 when the Olds and Didsbury districts were merged. Incumbent MLA for Didsbury Robert Clark ran in the new riding for Social Credit, and was easily re-elected. He was appointed to cabinet by premier Ernest Manning in 1966 and re-appointed by Harry Strom.

In the 1971 election, when Peter Lougheed's Progressive Conservatives swept Social Credit out of power, Clark retained Olds-Didsbury by a wide margin. He then served as opposition leader while Social Credit leader Werner Schmidt had no seat in the legislature, and when Schmidt resigned after failing to improve the party's fortunes, Clark won the leadership of the party, continuing as opposition leader. As party leader he won the largest majority in the history of Olds-Didsbury in the 1979 election, but the party failed to make inroads elsewhere. He subsequently resigned as party leader and MLA.

The resulting by-election in Olds-Didsbury shocked the political establishment in Canada, as Gordon Kesler of the separatist Western Canada Concept cruised to a surprise victory, due to anger over the National Energy Program and the patriation of the Constitution of Canada under Pierre Trudeau.

The premier called a snap election for later that year to ensure a quick showdown with Western Canada Concept. Kesler chose to run in Highwood, where he lived, and was defeated by a huge margin. This rendered him the shortest-serving MLA in Alberta history, counting from election to defeat. The Progressive Conservatives also finally captured Olds-Didsbury, where Stephen Stiles nearly doubled previous Progressive Conservative results amid a surge in turnout.

Stiles served only one term as MLA. Progressive Conservative candidate Roy Brassard easily defended Olds-Didsbury for his party, serving three terms. Brassard was appointed to cabinet as Minister for Seniors under Lougheed in 1991, and retired upon the dissolution of the Legislature in 1997. At the same time, Olds-Didsbury was merged with the north part of Three Hills-Airdrie to form Olds-Didsbury-Three Hills, with some parts of the riding transferred to Rocky Mountain House and Airdrie-Rocky View.

== Election results ==
=== Elections in the 1960s ===
1963 Alberta general election
Party	Candidate	Votes	%
Social Credit	Robert Clark	3,950	66.95
Independent Movement	Roger Lebeuf	1,550	26.27
New Democratic	Eva Banta	400	6.78
Total valid votes		5,900	100.00
Rejected, spoiled, and declined		14	—
Eligible electors / Turnout		9,177	64.44
Social Credit pickup new district.			
Source(s) Heritage Community Foundation. "Election results for Olds-Didsbury". Archived from the original on December 8, 2010.

1967 Alberta general election
Party	Candidate	Votes	%	±%
Social Credit	Robert Clark	4,052	65.22	-1.73
Liberal	Stan Bell	1,129	18.17	—
Independent Conservative	Chas. Purvis	547	8.80	—
New Democratic	Eva Banta	485	7.81	+1.03
Total valid votes		6,213	100.00	—
Rejected, spoiled, and declined		19	—	—
Eligible electors / Turnout		8,988	69.34	+4.89
Social Credit hold		Swing		-9.95
{{{1}}}

=== Elections in the 1970s ===
1971 Alberta general election
Party	Candidate	Votes	%	±%
Social Credit	Robert Clark	4,346	59.62	-5.60
Progressive Conservative	Rudolf Pedersen	2,578	35.36	+26.56
New Democratic	William C. McCutcheon	366	5.02	-2.79
Total valid votes		7,290	100.00	—
Rejected, spoiled, and declined		32	—	—
Eligible electors / Turnout		9,275	78.94	+9.61
Social Credit hold		Swing		-16.08
Source(s) Heritage Community Foundation. "Election results for Olds-Didsbury".

1975 Alberta general election
Party	Candidate	Votes	%	±%
Social Credit	Robert Clark	4,400	58.91	-0.71
Progressive Conservative	Kenneth Amthor	2,860	38.29	+2.93
New Democratic	Margaret Hinton	209	2.80	-2.22
Total valid votes		7,469	100.00	—
Rejected, spoiled, and declined		7	—	—
Eligible electors / Turnout		9,737	76.78	-2.16
Social Credit hold		Swing		-1.82
Source(s) Heritage Community Foundation. "Election results for Olds-Didsbury".

1979 Alberta general election
Party	Candidate	Votes	%	±%
Social Credit	Robert Clark	6,399	70.16	+11.25
Progressive Conservative	Bill Edgar	2,514	27.57	-10.73
New Democratic	Gregory Hoffarth	152	1.67	-1.13
Liberal	Stephen Shaw	55	0.60	—
Total valid votes		9,120	100.00	—
Rejected, spoiled, and declined		22	—	—
Eligible electors / Turnout		12,458	73.38	-3.40
Social Credit hold		Swing		+10.99
Source(s) Heritage Community Foundation. "Election results for Olds-Didsbury".

=== Elections in the 1980s ===
Alberta provincial by-election, February 17, 1982 Upon the resignation of Robert Curtis Clark on November 30, 1981
Party	Candidate	Votes	%	±%
Western Canada Concept	Gordon Kesler	4,015	42.20	—
Social Credit	Lloyd Quantz	2,669	28.05	-42.11
Progressive Conservative	Stephen Stiles	2,396	25.18	-2.38
New Democratic	Myrna Jarboe	308	3.24	+1.57
Liberal	George Leussink	126	1.32	+0.72
Independent	Adilsha Shivji	9	0.09	—
Total valid votes		9,514	100.00	—
Rejected, spoiled, and declined		19	—	—
Eligible electors / Turnout		13,798	69.09	-4.29
Western Canada Concept gain from Social Credit		Swing		+42.16
Source(s) Elections Alberta. "By-elections". Archived from the original on April 19, 2018.

1982 Alberta general election
Party	Candidate	Votes	%	±%
Progressive Conservative	Stephen Stiles	5,096	46.99	+21.81
Independent	Lloyd Quantz	2,755	25.40	—
Western Canada Concept	Daryl M. Jaddock	2,714	25.03	-17.18
New Democratic	Roy Agnew	233	2.15	-1.09
Independent	John Buttrey	47	0.43	—
Total valid votes		10,845	100.00	—
Rejected, spoiled, and declined		18	—	—
Eligible electors / Turnout		14,296	75.99	+6.90
Progressive Conservative gain from Western Canada Concept		Swing		+19.49
Source(s) Heritage Community Foundation. "Election results for Olds-Didsbury".

1986 Alberta general election
Party	Candidate	Votes	%	±%
Progressive Conservative	Roy Brassard	5,204	66.62	+19.63
Confederation of Regions	Elmer Knutson	1,785	22.85	—
New Democratic	Tom Monto	823	10.54	8.39
Total valid votes		7,812	100.00	—
Rejected, spoiled, and declined		30	—	—
Eligible electors / Turnout		14,322	54.75	-21.23
Progressive Conservative hold		Swing		-1.61
Source(s) Heritage Community Foundation. "Election results for Olds-Didsbury". Archived from the original on December 8, 2010.

1989 Alberta general election
Party	Candidate	Votes	%	±%
Progressive Conservative	Roy Brassard	4,960	60.25	-6.37
Social Credit	Ray Young	1,249	15.17	—
Liberal	Garfield Marks	1,182	14.36	—
New Democratic	Tom Monto	842	10.23	-0.31
Total valid votes		8,233	100.00	—
Rejected, spoiled, and declined		32	—	—
Eligible electors / Turnout		14,612	56.56	+1.81
Progressive Conservative hold		Swing		-10.77
Source(s) Heritage Community Foundation. "Election results for Olds-Didsbury". Archived from the original on December 8, 2010.

=== Elections in the 1990s ===
1993 Alberta general election
Party	Candidate	Votes	%	±%
Progressive Conservative	Roy Brassard	8,383	61.58	+1.33
Liberal	Donna Gole	3,378	24.81	+10.46
Social Credit	Derry H. Macfarlane	815	5.99	-9.18
Confederation of Regions	Dennis Combs	683	5.02	—
New Democratic	Ruth Scott	355	2.61	-7.62
Total valid votes		13,614	100.00	—
Rejected, spoiled, and declined		22	—	—
Eligible electors / Turnout		20,413	66.80	+10.24
Progressive Conservative hold		Swing		-4.56
Source(s) Heritage Community Foundation. "Election results for Olds-Didsbury".

== See also ==
- List of Alberta provincial electoral districts
- Canadian provincial electoral districts
- Olds, a town in central Alberta
- Didsbury, a town in central Alberta
