= Didsbury (provincial electoral district) =

Defunct provincial electoral district in Alberta, Canada

Coordinates: 51.65°N 114.14°W

Alberta electoral district

Defunct provincial electoral district
- Legislature: Legislative Assembly of Alberta
- District created: 1909
- District abolished: 1963
- First contested: 1909
- Last contested: 1959

Didsbury was a provincial electoral district in Alberta, Canada, mandated to return a single member to the Legislative Assembly of Alberta from 1909 to 1963.

== History ==
The Didsbury electoral district was formed from the Rosebud electoral district prior to the 1909 Alberta general election.

From 1924 to 1956, the district used instant-runoff voting to elect its MLA.

The Didsbury electoral district was abolished and the Olds-Didsbury and Three Hills electoral districts were formed in its place prior to the 1963 Alberta general election.

=== Members of the Legislative Assembly (MLAs) ===
Members of the Legislative Assembly for Didsbury
Assembly	Years	Member	Party
See Rosebud electoral district from 1905-1909
2nd	1909–1913	Joseph E. Stauffer	Liberal
3rd	1913–1917	Joseph E. Stauffer	Liberal
4th	1917–1921	Henry B. Atkins	Liberal
5th	1921–1926	Austin Claypool	United Farmers
6th	1926–1930	Austin Claypool	United Farmers
7th	1930–1935	Austin Claypool	United Farmers
8th	1935–1940	Edward P. Foster	Social Credit
9th	1940–1944	Ernest M. Brown	Independent
10th	1944–1948	Howard G. Hammell	Social Credit
11th	1948–1952	Howard G. Hammell	Social Credit
12th	1952–1955	Howard G. Hammell	Social Credit
13th	1955–1959	James Lawrence Owens	Social Credit
14th	1959–1960	James Lawrence Owens	Social Credit
14th	1960–1963	Robert Curtis Clark	Social Credit
See Olds-Didsbury electoral district from 1963-1997 and Three Hills electoral district from 1963-1993

== Election results ==
=== 1909 ===
1909 Alberta general election
Party	Candidate	Votes	%	±%
Liberal	Joseph E. Stauffer	993	73.18%	–
Conservative	S. T. Scarlett	208	15.33%	–
Independent	Cornelius Hiebert	156	11.50%	–
Total		1,357	–	–
Rejected, spoiled and declined		N/A	–	–
Eligible electors / turnout		2,054	66.07%	–
Liberal pickup new district.				
Source(s) Source: "Didsbury Official Results 1909 Alberta general election". Alberta Heritage Community Foundation.

=== 1913 ===
1913 Alberta general election
Party	Candidate	Votes	%	±%
Liberal	Joseph E. Stauffer	948	59.32%	-13.85%
Conservative	G. B. Sexsmith	650	40.68%	25.35%
Total		1,598	–	–
Rejected, spoiled and declined		N/A	–	–
Eligible electors / turnout		2,222	71.92%	5.85
Liberal hold		Swing		-19.60%
Source(s) Source: "Didsbury Official Results 1913 Alberta general election". Alberta Heritage Community Foundation.

=== 1917 ===
1917 Alberta general election
Party	Candidate	Votes	%	±%
Liberal	Henry B. Atkins	1,394	52.80%	-6.52%
Conservative	W. L. Tolton	1,246	47.20%	6.52%
Total		2,640	–	–
Rejected, spoiled and declined		N/A	–	–
Eligible electors / turnout		4,376	60.33%	-11.59%
Liberal hold		Swing		-6.52%
Source(s) Source: "Didsbury Official Results 1917 Alberta general election". Alberta Heritage Community Foundation.

=== 1921 ===
1921 Alberta general election
Party	Candidate	Votes	%	±%
United Farmers	Austin Claypool	2,528	59.31%	–
Liberal	Geo. H. Webber	1,734	40.69%	-12.12%
Total		4,262	–	–
Rejected, spoiled and declined		N/A	–	–
Eligible electors / turnout		6,621	64.37%	4.04%
United Farmers gain from Liberal		Swing		6.51%
Source(s) Source: "Didsbury Official Results 1921 Alberta general election". Alberta Heritage Community Foundation.

=== 1926 ===
1926 Alberta general election
Party	Candidate	Votes	%	±%
United Farmers	Austin B. Claypool	2,292	57.21%	-2.10%
Liberal	D. MacDonald	895	22.34%	-18.34%
Conservative	S. P. Williams	819	20.44%	–
Total		4,262	–	–
Rejected, spoiled and declined		N/A	–	–
Eligible electors / turnout		6,621	64.37%	4.04%
United Farmers hold		Swing		1.90%
Source(s) Source: "Didsbury Official Results 1926 Alberta general election". Alberta Heritage Community Foundation.

=== 1930 ===
1930 Alberta general election
Party	Candidate	Votes	%	±%
United Farmers	Austin Claypool	1,756	54.43%	-2.78%
Independent	W. A. Austin	1,470	45.57%	–
Total		3,226	–	–
Rejected, spoiled and declined		144	–	–
Eligible electors / turnout		4,290	78.55%	17.28%
United Farmers hold		Swing		-13.00%
Source(s) Source: "Didsbury Official Results 1930 Alberta general election". Alberta Heritage Community Foundation.

=== 1935 ===
1935 Alberta general election
Party	Candidate	Votes	%	±%
Social Credit	Edward P. Foster	2,731	64.24%	–
United Farmers	Austin Claypool	610	14.35%	-40.08%
Liberal	A. Sheline	607	14.28%	–
Conservative	A. S. Gough	303	7.13%	–
Total		4,251	–	–
Rejected, spoiled and declined		114	–	–
Eligible electors / turnout		5,136	84.99%	6.43%
Social Credit gain from United Farmers		Swing		20.51%
Source(s) Source: "Didsbury Official Results 1935 Alberta general election". Alberta Heritage Community Foundation.

=== 1940 ===
1940 Alberta general election
Party	Candidate	Votes	%	±%
Independent	Ernest M. Brown	2,379	50.71%	–
Social Credit	Edward P. Foster	2,312	49.29%	-14.96%
Total		4,691	–	–
Rejected, spoiled and declined		181	–	–
Eligible electors / turnout		6,538	74.52%	-10.47%
Independent gain from Social Credit		Swing		-24.23%
Source(s) Source: "Didsbury Official Results 1940 Alberta general election". Alberta Heritage Community Foundation.

=== 1944 ===
1944 Alberta general election
Party	Candidate	Votes	%	±%
Social Credit	Howard G. Hammell	2,485	59.46%	10.18%
Independent	C. C. Gillespie	966	23.12%	-27.60%
Co-operative Commonwealth	Raymond C. Bell	728	17.42%	–
Total		4,179	–	–
Rejected, spoiled and declined		N/A	–	–
Eligible electors / turnout		6,056	69.01%	-5.51%
Social Credit gain from Independent		Swing		17.46%
Source(s) Source: "Didsbury Official Results 1944 Alberta general election". Alberta Heritage Community Foundation.

=== 1948 ===
1948 Alberta general election
Party	Candidate	Votes	%	±%
Social Credit	Howard G. Hammell	2,647	66.19%	6.73%
Independent	Matthew Schmaltz	935	23.38%	0.27%
Co-operative Commonwealth	Raymond C. Bell	417	10.43%	-6.99%
Total		3,999	–	–
Rejected, spoiled and declined		306	–	–
Eligible electors / turnout		6,678	64.47%	-4.54%
Social Credit hold		Swing		3.23%
Source(s) Source: "Didsbury Official Results 1948 Alberta general election". Alberta Heritage Community Foundation.

=== 1952 ===
1952 Alberta general election
Party	Candidate	Votes	%	±%
Social Credit	Howard G. Hammell	2,870	69.61%	3.42%
Liberal	Ludwig L. Schmaltz	1,253	30.39%	–
Total		4,123	–	–
Rejected, spoiled and declined		192	–	–
Eligible electors / turnout		6,964	61.96%	-2.50%
Social Credit hold		Swing		-1.80%
Source(s) Source: "Didsbury Official Results 1952 Alberta general election". Alberta Heritage Community Foundation.

=== 1955 ===
1955 Alberta general election
Party	Candidate	Votes	%	±%
Social Credit	James Lawrence Owens	2601	53.74%	-14.87%
Coalition	Ben Brown	2,239	46.26%	–
Total		4,840	–	–
Rejected, spoiled and declined		275	–	–
Eligible electors / turnout		7,024	72.31%	10.35%
Social Credit hold		Swing		10.35%
Source(s) Source: "Didsbury Official Results 1955 Alberta general election". Alberta Heritage Community Foundation.

=== 1959 ===
1959 Alberta general election
Party	Candidate	Votes	%	±%
Social Credit	James Lawrence Owens	3,042	72.15%	18.41%
Progressive Conservative	Douglas N. Anderson	849	20.14%	–
Liberal	Walter P. Hourihan	325	7.71%	–
Total		4,216	–	–
Rejected, spoiled and declined		740	–	–
Eligible electors / turnout		6,894	71.89%	-0.42%
Social Credit hold		Swing		-13.59%
Source(s) Source: "Didsbury Official Results 1959 Alberta general election". Alberta Heritage Community Foundation.

=== 1960 by-election ===
Alberta provincial by-election, November 30, 1960 Upon the death of James Lawrence Owens on September 27, 1960
Party	Candidate	Votes	%	±%
Social Credit	Robert Curtis Clark	2,217	53.51%	-18.64%
Liberal	James A. Lore	1,162	28.05%	20.34%
Progressive Conservative	W. H. Metz	764	18.44%	-1.70%
Total valid votes		4,143	–	–
Rejected, spoiled and declined		–	–	–
Electors / turnout		–	–	–
Social Credit hold		Swing		N/A
Source(s) "By-elections". Elections Alberta.

== Plebiscite results ==
=== 1957 liquor plebiscite ===
1957 Alberta liquor plebiscite results: Didsbury
Question A: Do you approve additional types of outlets for the sale of beer, wine and spirituous liquor subject to a local vote?
Ballot choice	Votes	%
No	1,961	59.12%
Yes	1,356	40.88%
Total votes	2,429	100%
Rejected, spoiled and declined	34	
6,535 eligible electors, turnout 51.28%

On October 30, 1957, a stand-alone plebiscite was held province wide in all 50 of the then current provincial electoral districts in Alberta. The government decided to consult Alberta voters to decide on liquor sales and mixed drinking after a divisive debate in the legislature. The plebiscite was intended to deal with the growing demand for reforming antiquated liquor control laws.

The plebiscite was conducted in two parts. Question A, asked in all districts, asked the voters if the sale of liquor should be expanded in Alberta, while Question B, asked in a handful of districts within the corporate limits of Calgary and Edmonton, asked if men and women should be allowed to drink together in establishments.

Province wide Question A of the plebiscite passed in 33 of the 50 districts while Question B passed in all five districts. Didsbury voted against the proposal by a wide margin. The voter turnout in the district was well above the province wide average of 46% with well over half the electors turning out to vote.

Official district returns were released to the public on December 31, 1957. The Social Credit government in power at the time did not consider the results binding. However the results of the vote led the government to repeal all existing liquor legislation and introduce an entirely new Liquor Act.

Municipal districts lying inside electoral districts that voted against the plebiscite such as Didsbury were designated Local Option Zones by the Alberta Liquor Control Board and considered effective dry zones. Business owners who wanted a licence had to petition for a binding municipal plebiscite in order to be granted a licence.

== See also ==
- List of Alberta provincial electoral districts
- Canadian provincial electoral districts
