= Gordon Kesler =

Canadian politician (born 1945)

Member of the Legislative Assembly of Alberta for Olds-Didsbury
- In office February 17, 1982 – November 2, 1982
- Preceded by: Robert Curtis Clark
- Succeeded by: Stephen Stiles

Personal details
- Born: 1945 (age 80–81)
- Party: Western Canada Concept
- Other political affiliations: Republican Party of Alberta (2025)

Gordon Kesler (born 1945) is a Canadian retired politician from Alberta. Politically, he is an Albertan separatist.

== Career ==
Kesler's surprise victory in the February 1982 by-election for the Western Canada Concept received national media attention. Kesler was the first separatist politician elected in Canada outside of Quebec since the 1870s, although his activities were primarily related to opposing official bilingualism and the introduction of the metric system.

After the win, Kesler became leader of the party. He won the Olds-Didsbury electoral district defeating Stephen Stiles of the Progressive Conservatives and Lloyd Quantz of Social Credit and three other candidates.

During the 1982 general election, held two-and-a-half months later in November, Kesler lost his seat despite Western Canada Concept fielding a full slate. He had shifted districts to his home district of Highwood after promising to move to Olds-Didsbury if elected. The time he served was the second shortest between election and defeat in the legislature's history. Harry Alger from the Progressive Conservatives defeated him with a five thousand vote plurality.

In a 1983 letter to the editor of the Alberta Report, Doug Christie, founder of the Western Canada Concept, accused Gordon Kesler of betraying separatism. Kesler and his party had been striving to distance themselves from the controversial Christie.

Kesler endorsed the Republican Party of Alberta in the 2025 Olds-Didsbury-Three Hills provincial by-election.

== Electoral record ==
Alberta provincial by-election, February 17, 1982: Olds-Didsbury Upon the resignation of Robert Curtis Clark on November 30, 1981
Party	Candidate	Votes	%	±%
Western Canada Concept	Gordon Kesler	4,015	42.20	—
Social Credit	Lloyd Quantz	2,669	28.05	-42.11
Progressive Conservative	Stephen Stiles	2,396	25.18	-2.38
New Democratic	Myrna Jarboe	308	3.24	+1.57
Liberal	George Leussink	126	1.32	+0.72
Independent	Adilsha Shivji	9	0.09	—
Total valid votes		9,514	100.00	—
Rejected, spoiled, and declined		19	—	—
Eligible electors / Turnout		13,798	69.09	-4.29
Western Canada Concept gain from Social Credit		Swing		+42.16
Source(s) Elections Alberta. "By-elections". Archived from the original on April 19, 2018.

1982 Alberta general election: Highwood
Party	Candidate	Votes	%	±%
Progressive Conservative	Harry Alger	7,811	70.08%	3.58%
Western Canada Concept	Gordon Kesler	2,006	18.00%	*
New Democratic	William McCutcheon	465	4.17%	0.51%
Independent	R.L. Snell	436	3.91%	
Independent	Don Tanner	245	2.20%	
Alberta Reform Movement	Ronald Arkes	183	1.64%	*
Total		11,146		
Rejected, spoiled and declined		30		
Eligible electors / Turnout		14,495	77.10%	
Progressive Conservative hold		Swing		10.79%
Source(s) "Highwood Official Results 1982 Alberta general election". Alberta Heritage Community Foundation.

== Personal life ==
Kesler lives in Arizona.
