= Roy Brassard =

Canadian politician (1930–2008)

MLA for Olds-Didsbury
- In office 1986–1997
- Preceded by: Stephen Stiles
- Succeeded by: district abolished

Personal details
- Born: October 1, 1930 Fort William, Ontario, Canada
- Died: October 17, 2008 (aged 78) Calgary, Alberta, Canada
- Party: Progressive Conservative Association of Alberta

Robert Roy Brassard (October 1, 1930 – October 17, 2008) was a Canadian politician who served as a Progressive Conservative Alberta MLA, and more recently a public school board member.

== Provincial government ==
Brassard was elected as a member of the Legislative Assembly of Alberta for Olds-Didsbury in 1986, 1989, and 1993. In 1991, the then premier of Alberta, Don Getty created a new ministry to deal with seniors affairs, selecting Brassard to be the minister. He had already dealt with senior issues while he was Associate Minister of Family and Social Services. In 1996 Brassard announced he was retiring from provincial politics to spend more time with his family.

== Local public school board ==
After Brassard retired from provincial politics, he became an elected trustee on, and chair of Chinook's Edge School Division No. 73, a public school district, in Ward 8 (Didsbury).

In 2005 Brassard found that because he was Catholic he may not be able to remain on the board. According to the Alberta School Act, if an area has a Catholic separate school district, a Catholic person in the area can not belong to the public board. After Brassard had been elected to the board, local Catholics voted to make the area part of a Catholic Separate board (effective in 2005). That meant legally, Brassard was no longer allowed to remain on the public board. The board supported Brassard in calling this discrimination, and filing a human rights complaint with the provincial Human Rights Commission. They have also requested the province change the School Act. Brassard would be eligible to run for the Catholic school district. However, he said his children went to the public system, so that is where he felt he should serve.

== Personal life ==
Brassard studied marketing at Winnipeg's Red River College and business administration at the University of Manitoba. In 1950 he married Sheila Haire, and raised his family in Didsbury.

Legislative Assembly of Alberta
Preceded by Stephen Stiles	MLA Olds-Didsbury; 1986–1997	Succeeded by District Abolished
