= Edward P. Foster =

Canadian politician

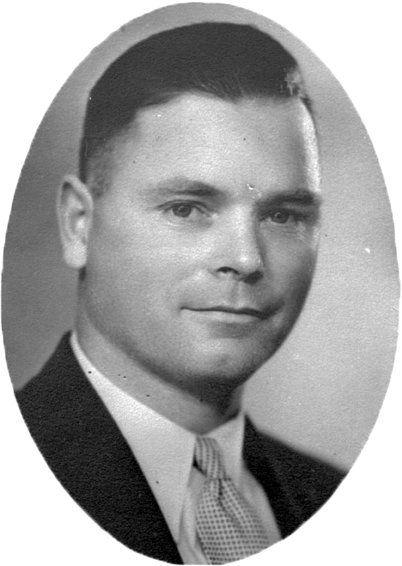

Member of the Legislative Assembly of Alberta
- In office 1935–1940
- Preceded by: Austin Claypool
- Succeeded by: Ernest M. Brown
- Constituency: Didsbury

Personal details
- Born: March 21, 1896 Guelph, Ontario
- Died: June 9, 1962 (aged 68) Three Hills, Alberta
- Party: Social Credit

Edward Peter Foster (March 21, 1896 – June 9, 1962) was a provincial politician from Alberta, Canada. He served as a member of the Legislative Assembly of Alberta from 1935 to 1940, sitting with the Social Credit caucus in government.
