= Stephen Stiles =

Canadian politician (1935–2023)

Member of the Alberta Legislative Assembly for Olds-Didsbury
- In office 2 November 1982 – 7 May 1986
- Preceded by: Gordon Kesler
- Succeeded by: Roy Brassard

Personal details
- Born: 25 March 1935 Oldham, England
- Died: 10 April 2023 (aged 88) Didsbury, Alberta
- Party: Progressive Conservative Association of Alberta
- Education: University of Calgary (JD)

Anthony Stephen Stiles (25 March 1935 – 10 April 2023) was a member of the Legislative Assembly of Alberta. He was born at Oldham, England.

Stiles graduated from the first class of the University of Calgary Faculty of Law in 1979.

Stiles first ran for the Progressive Conservatives in the February 1982 by-election in Olds-Didsbury that saw Gordon Kesler from the Western Canada Concept elected. He was defeated running a distant third behind Alberta Social Credit Party candidate Lloyd Quantz.

Stiles won the 1982 general election months later, and served the riding for one term from 1982 to 1986 as the first Conservative elected to the riding.

Stiles died on 10 April 2023, in Didsbury after a long period with Multiple system atrophy - Parkinsonism.

Legislative Assembly of Alberta
Preceded by Gordon Kesler	MLA Olds-Didsbury; 1982–1986	Succeeded by Roy Brassard
