= Foothills-Rocky View =

Defunct provincial electoral district in Alberta, Canada

Alberta electoral district
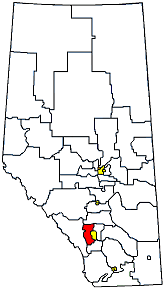
- 2004 boundaries

Defunct provincial electoral district
- Legislature: Legislative Assembly of Alberta
- District created: 2004
- District abolished: 2012
- First contested: 2004
- Last contested: 2008

Foothills-Rocky View was a provincial electoral district in Alberta, Canada, mandated to return a single member to the Legislative Assembly of Alberta from under the first-past-the-post voting system 2004 to 2012.

== History ==
The Foothills-Rocky View electoral district was located on the western rural edge of Calgary in southern Alberta. It was created in the 2003 electoral boundary re-distribution from the eastern portion of the electoral district of Banff-Cochrane and the western portion of the old electoral district of Airdrie-Rocky View which comprises the northern portion of the riding. The district is named after the Foothills of Southern Alberta and Rocky View County. The riding included part of the town of Cochrane, Bragg Creek, and the Springbank area.

The Foothills-Rocky View electoral district was dissolved in the 2010 electoral boundary re-distribution, and portions of the district would incorporate the Airdrie, Banff-Cochrane, and Chestermere-Rocky View electoral districts for the 2012 Alberta general election.

The district and its antecedents have been favourable to electing Progressive Conservative candidates in recent decades.

=== Boundary history ===
53 Foothills-Rocky View 2003 boundaries
Bordering districts
North	East	West	South
Olds-Didsbury-Three Hills	Airdrie-Chestermere, Calgary-Bow, Calgary-Elbow, Calgary-Glenmore, Calgary-Foothills, Calgary-Lougheed, Calgary-Mackay, Calgary-North West, Calgary-Shaw, Calgary-West, Highwood	Banff-Cochrane	Highwood
riding map goes here		Foothills-Rocky View in relation to Calgary ridings	Foothills-Rocky View in the province of Alberta
Legal description from the Statutes of Alberta 2003, Electoral Divisions Act.
Starting at the intersection of the east boundary of Rge. 6 W5 and the north boundary of Twp. 28; then 1. east along the north boundary to the east boundary of Sec. 3 in Twp. 29, Rge. 2 W5; 2. north along the east boundary of Secs. 3 and 10 to the north boundary of Sec. 11 in the Twp.; 3. east along the north boundary of Secs. 11 and 12 in the Twp. and the north boundary of Secs. 7, 8 and 9 in Twp. 29, Rge. 1 W5 to the east boundary of Sec. 16 in the Twp.; 4. north along the east boundary of Sec. 16 to the north boundary of Sec. 15 in the Twp.; 5. east along the north boundary of Secs. 15 and 14 in the Twp. to its intersection with the centre line of Highway 2; 6. south along Highway 2 to the north boundary of Sec. 24 in Twp. 27, Rge. 1 W5; 7. west along the north boundary of Secs. 24, 23 and 22 to the east boundary of Sec. 21; 8. south along the east boundary of Secs. 21, 16, 9 and 4 in the Twp. and Secs. 33, 28, 21 and 16 in Twp. 26, Rge. 1 W5 to the north boundary of Sec. 10 in the Twp.; 9. east along the north boundary of Secs. 10, 11 and 12 (Highway 566) to the centre line of Highway 2; 10. south along the centre line of Highway 2 to the north Calgary city boundary; 11. west, south and east along the Calgary city boundary to the intersection with the centre line of Highway 2; 12. south along Highway 2 to the intersection with Highway 2A; 13. south along Highway 2A to the north boundary of Sec. 5 in Twp. 21, Rge. 29 W4; 14. west along the north boundary of Sec. 5 in Twp. 21, Rge. 29 W4 and the north boundary of Sec. 1 in Twp. 21, Rge. 1 W5 to the east boundary of Sec. 2 in Twp. 21, Rge. 1 W5; 15. south along the east boundary of Sec. 2 in Twp. 21, Rge. 1 W5 and Secs. 35, 26 and 23 in Twp. 20, Rge. 1 W5 to Highway 7; 16. west and south along Highway 7 to the north boundary of Sec. 9 in Twp. 20, Rge. 2 W5; 17. south along the east boundary of Sec. 9 and 4 in the Twp. and Secs. 33 and 28 in Twp. 19 to the north boundary of Sec. 21 in Twp. 19, Rge. 2 W5; 18. west along Secs. 21, 20 and 19 in the Twp. and Sec. 24 in Twp. 19, Rge. 3 W5 to the east boundary of Sec. 26 in Twp. 19, Rge. 3 W5; 19. north along the east boundary of Secs. 26 and 35 to the north boundary of Twp. 19, Rge. 3 W5; 20. west along the north boundary of Twp. 19 to Highway 546; 21. in a southwesterly direction along Highway 546 to the east boundary of the Rocky Mountain Forest Reserve (at north boundary of Sec. 26, Twp. 19, Rge. 4 W5); 22. north along the Rocky Mountain Forest Reserve to the north boundary of Twp. 23, Rge. 6 W5; 23. north along the east boundary of Rge. 6 to the south boundary of the Stoney Indian Reserve No. 42, 143 and 144; 24. generally in an easterly direction along the boundary of the Stoney Indian Reserve to the west boundary of the Town of Cochrane; 25. in a southeasterly and northerly direction along the Cochrane town boundary to the north Cochrane boundary (at the north boundary of Sec. 1, Twp. 26, Rge. 4 W5); 26. north along the east boundary of Sec. 12 to the north boundary of Sec. 12; 27. west along the north boundary of Secs. 12, 11, 10 and 9 to the east boundary of Sec. 8; 28. south along the east boundary of Sec. 8 to the north boundary of the Stoney Indian Reserve No. 142, 143 and 144; 29. in a westerly direction along the Stoney Indian Reserve boundary to the east shore of Ghost Lake Reservoir at the north boundary of Sec. 12 in Twp. 26, Rge. 6 W5; 30. west along the north boundary of Sec. 12 to the northwest shore of the Ghost Lake Reservoir; 31. in a northerly direction along the west shore of the Ghost Lake Reservoir to the east boundary of Sec. 23; 32. north along the east boundary of Secs. 23, 26 and 35 in the Twp. and the east boundary of Secs. 2 and 11 in Twp. 27, Rge. 6 W5 to the south boundary of the Stoney Indian Reserve 142B; 33. east along the south boundary of the Stoney Indian Reserve 142B to the east boundary of Rge. 6 W5; 34. north along the east boundary of Rge. 6 to the north boundary of Twp. 28, the starting point.
Note:

Members of the Legislative Assembly for Foothills-Rocky View
Assembly	Years	Member	Party
See Banff-Cochrane 1979-2001 and Airdrie-Rocky View 1993-2001
26th	2004–2008	Ted Morton	Progressive Conservative
27th	2008–2012	Ted Morton	Progressive Conservative
See Airdrie, Banff-Cochrane and Chestermere-Rocky View 2012-2019

=== Electoral history ===
The electoral district was created in the 2004 boundary redistribution. In the election held that year Progressive Conservative candidate Ted Morton who chose not to run for another term of senator-in-waiting in the 2004 Senate nominee election decided to run for seat to the legislature instead.

Morton defeated four other candidates with 60% of the vote to pick up the new district for the Progressive Conservatives. After the election Morton began his race to succeed Ralph Klein in the 2006 Progressive Conservative leadership race. Morton lost but was appointed to cabinet by new Premier Ed Stelmach in 2006.

Morton ran for a second term in the 2008 general election. He slightly increased his popular vote and returned to power with a big majority. In 2010 he was shuffled to the Minister of Finance portfolio.

== Legislative election results ==
=== 2004 ===
2004 Alberta general election
Party	Candidate	Votes	%	±%
Progressive Conservative	Ted Morton	6,782	60.31%	–
Liberal	Herb Coburn	1,956	17.39%	–
Greens	Shelley Willson	1,188	10.56%	–
Alberta Alliance	Jason Herasemluk	1,088	9.67%	–
New Democratic	Roland Schmidt	232	2.06%	–
Total		11,246	–	–
Rejected, spoiled and declined		96	–	–
Eligible electors / turnout		22,420	50.59%	–
Progressive Conservative pickup new district.				
Source(s) Source: "Foothills-Rocky View Statement of Official Results 2004 Alberta general election" (PDF). Elections Alberta.

=== 2008 ===
2008 Alberta general election
Party	Candidate	Votes	%	±%
Progressive Conservative	Ted Morton	6,916	57.41%	−2.90%
Liberal	Herb Coburn	2,200	18.26%	0.87%
Wildrose Alliance	Joseph McMaster	1,797	14.92%	5.92%
Green	Larry Ashmore	937	7.78%	−2.78%
New Democratic	Ricardo de Menzies	196	1.63%	−0.43%
Total		12,046	–	–
Rejected, spoiled and declined		84	–	–
Eligible electors / turnout		25,223	48.04%	-2.50%
Progressive Conservative hold		Swing		-1.88%
Source(s) Source: The Report on the March 3, 2008 Provincial General Election of the Twenty-seventh Legislative Assembly (PDF). Elections Alberta. pp. 408–413.

== Senate nominee election results ==
=== 2004 ===
2004 Senate nominee election results: Foothills-Rocky View				Turnout 50.42%	
Affiliation	Candidate	Votes	% votes	% ballots	Rank
Progressive Conservative	Bert Brown	5,787	19.76%	61.15%	1
Progressive Conservative	Jim Silye	4,283	14.62%	45.26%	5
Progressive Conservative	Betty Unger	3,987	13.61%	42.13%	2
Progressive Conservative	David Usherwood	2,942	10.04%	31.09%	6
Progressive Conservative	Cliff Breitkreuz	2,882	9.84%	30.45%	3
Independent	Link Byfield	2,819	9.62%	29.79%	4
Alberta Alliance	Vance Gough	1,896	6.47%	20.03%	8
Alberta Alliance	Michael Roth	1,608	5.49%	16.99%	7
Independent	Tom Sindlinger	1,597	5.45%	16.88%	9
Alberta Alliance	Gary Horan	1,490	5.10%	15.74%	10
Total votes		29,291	100%		
Total ballots		9,464	3.10 votes per ballot		
Rejected, spoiled and declined		1,839			

Voters had the option of selecting four candidates on the ballot

== 2004 student vote results ==
Participating schools
Millarville Community School
Springbank Community High School
Springbank Middle School
Strathcona-Tweedsmuir School
W G Murdoch School

On November 19, 2004, a student vote was conducted at participating Alberta schools to parallel the 2004 Alberta general election results. The vote was designed to educate students and simulate the electoral process for persons who have not yet reached the legal majority. The vote was conducted in 80 of the 83 provincial electoral districts with students voting for actual election candidates. Schools with a large student body that reside in another electoral district had the option to vote for candidates outside of the electoral district then where they were physically located.

2004 Alberta student vote results
Affiliation	Candidate	Votes	%
Progressive Conservative	Ted Morton	571	42.42%
Green	Shelley Willson	377	28.01%
Liberal	Herb Coburn	219	16.27%
Alberta Alliance	Jason Herasemluk	97	7.21%
NDP	Roland Schmidt	82	6.09%
Total		1,346	100%
Rejected, spoiled and declined		57	

== See also ==
- List of Alberta provincial electoral districts
- Canadian provincial electoral districts
