= Airdrie-Rocky View =

Defunct provincial electoral district in Alberta, Canada

Alberta electoral district

Defunct provincial electoral district
- Legislature: Legislative Assembly of Alberta
- District created: 1997
- District abolished: 2004
- First contested: 1997
- Last contested: 2001

Airdrie-Rocky View was a provincial electoral district in Alberta, Canada, mandated to return a single member to the Legislative Assembly of Alberta using the first past the post method of voting from 1997 to 2004.

== History ==
Members of the Legislative Assembly for Airdrie-Rocky View
| Assembly | Years | Member | Party |
|---|---|---|---|
See Three Hills-Airdrie electoral district from 1993 to 1997, Drumheller electoral district from 1971 to 1997 and Olds-Didsbury electoral district from 1963 to 1997
| 24th | 1997–2001 | Carol Louise Haley | Progressive Conservative |
| 25th | 2001–2004 | Carol Louise Haley | Progressive Conservative |
See Airdrie-Chestermere electoral district from 2004 to 2012 and Foothills-Rocky View electoral district from 2004 to 2012

The riding was created in the 1997 electoral district re-distribution to encompass the area north and east of the city of Calgary. The former Three Hills-Airdrie electoral district was split, with the north part of the riding merged with Olds-Didsbury, to form Olds-Didsbury-Three Hills, the south half forming the eastern portion of Airdrie-Rocky View. The southern portion of Olds-Didsbury and western portion of Drumheller would also be transferred to Airdrie-Rocky View.

The Airdrie-Rocky View electoral district was abolished in the 2003 electoral boundary re-distribution and the territory being formed into the new electoral districts of Airdrie-Chestermere to the east, and Foothills-Rocky View to the west.

== Election results ==
=== 1997 ===
1997 Alberta general election
| Party | Candidate | Votes | % | ±% |
|---|---|---|---|---|
| Progressive Conservative | Carol Louise Haley | 8,492 | 69.06% | – |
| Liberal | James Welsh | 2,197 | 17.87% | – |
| Social Credit | Peter Smits | 1,125 | 9.15% | – |
| New Democratic | Doris Bannister | 482 | 3.92% | – |
| Total | | 12,296 | – | – |
| Rejected, spoiled and declined | | 24 | – | – |
| Eligible electors / turnout | | 22,998 | 53.57% | – |
| Progressive Conservative pickup new district. | | | | |
Source(s) Source: "Airdrie-Rocky View Official Results 1997 Alberta general election". Alberta Heritage Community Foundation.

=== 2001 ===
2001 Alberta general election
| Party | Candidate | Votes | % | ±% |
|---|---|---|---|---|
| Progressive Conservative | Carol Louise Haley | 13,195 | 79.91% | 10.84% |
| Liberal | Carol L'Abbee | 2,043 | 12.37% | -5.50% |
| Independent | Tom Humble | 683 | 4.14% | – |
| New Democratic | Christopher Hill | 592 | 3.59% | -0.33% |
| Total | | 16,513 | – | – |
| Rejected, spoiled and declined | | 25 | – | – |
| Eligible electors / turnout | | 30,546 | 54.14% | 0.57% |
| Progressive Conservative hold | | Swing | | 8.17% |
Source(s) Source: "Airdrie-Rocky View Official Results 2001 Alberta general election". Alberta Heritage Community Foundation.

== See also ==
- List of Alberta provincial electoral districts
- Canadian provincial electoral districts
