= Howard Hammell =

Canadian politician (1896-1965)

Member of the Legislative Assembly of Alberta
- In office 1944–1955
- Preceded by: Ernest M. Brown
- Succeeded by: James Lawrence Owens
- Constituency: Didsbury

Personal details
- Born: May 6, 1896 Killarney, Manitoba
- Died: February 9, 1965 (aged 68) Carstairs, Alberta
- Party: Social Credit

Howard George Hammell (May 6, 1896 – February 9, 1965) was a provincial politician from Alberta, Canada. He served as a member of the Legislative Assembly of Alberta from 1944 to 1955, sitting with the Social Credit caucus in government.
