= Robert Curtis Clark =

Canadian politician (1937–2020)

Leader of the Official Opposition in Alberta
- In office September 15, 1973 – November 28, 1980
- Preceded by: James Douglas Henderson
- Succeeded by: Raymond Speaker

Member of the Legislative Assembly of Alberta
- In office 1960–1981
- Preceded by: James Lawrence Owens
- Succeeded by: Gordon Kesler
- Constituency: Didsbury (1960–63); Olds-Didsbury (1963–81)

Personal details
- Born: July 2, 1937 Acme, Alberta, Canada
- Died: July 10, 2020 (aged 83) Calgary, Alberta, Canada
- Party: Alberta Social Credit Party
- Occupation: teacher

Robert Curtis "Bob" Clark (July 2, 1937 – July 10, 2020) was a Canadian teacher, civil servant and politician. He served in the Legislative Assembly of Alberta from 1960 to 1981 including time as a Cabinet Minister in Premier Ernest Manning's government, and later as Leader of the Alberta Social Credit Party and Leader of the Official Opposition. Following his political career, he served as the Alberta Ethics Commissioner from 1992 to 2003.

== Early life ==
Robert Curtis Clark was born on July 2, 1937, in Acme, Alberta, Canada. He became a school teacher at the age of nineteen in 1956 in Mountain View County.

== Political career ==
=== Early career ===
Clark was first elected to the Alberta Legislature in a by-election held in the central Alberta riding of Didsbury on November 30, 1960. The by-election was made necessary by the death of the previous member, James Owens. Clark won with twice as many votes as Liberal candidate J.A. Lore. He thus became the youngest Alberta MLA at the age of twenty-three years.

Ahead of the 1963 Alberta general election, Clark's riding was largely merged with nearby Olds to form Olds-Didsbury. The merged riding was mostly Clark's territory, and he won the new district in a landslide over two other candidates.

=== Cabinet Minister ===
In 1966 Clark was appointed Minister of Youth by Premier Ernest Manning. In the 1967 general election Clark finished well ahead of the other three candidates. In 1968 Clark was appointed Minister of Education by Premier Harry Strom. Clark easily retained his seat in the 1971 general election even as the Social Credit government was defeated.

=== Opposition leader ===
Clark was chosen Official Opposition leader by the Social Credit caucus in September 1973 after James Henderson left the caucus to sit as an independent. He had earlier run for the leadership of the party and had the support of half the party's MLAs, but was defeated by Werner Schmidt, who did not have a seat in the legislature.

Schmidt led the party to a very poor showing in the 1975 general election. The Socreds lost 23% of its popular vote and fell from 25 to four seats in the Legislature, barely holding onto official status. Clark easily defeated two other candidates with a large majority in his home district. Schmidt resigned shortly after the election, and Clark took the leadership unopposed. In six years as opposition leader, he made little headway on the Tories under Peter Lougheed, who had rapidly built up a machine that dominated Alberta politics as Social Credit had done in its heyday.

Under Clark, Social Credit earned a larger share of the popular vote in the 1979 general election, but failed to win more seats. In his home district he won with the biggest plurality of his career as he remained personally popular. Less than a year after the election Clark resigned as Social Credit leader, and resigned his seat on November 30, 1981. The separatist Western Canada Concept won his former riding by a resounding margin in the subsequent by-election. Olds-Didsbury was located in an area that had long been Socred heartland; the Olds half had been in Socred hands for all but one month since the party's 1935 breakthrough (when incumbent Herbert Ash left the party to run as an independent), while the Didsbury half been in Socred hands for all but four of the previous 46 years. This marked the beginning of the end of Social Credit as a force in Alberta politics. In a snap election held a year later, Social Credit lost its remaining seats in the legislature, never to return.

== After politics ==
After leaving political office, Clark became a consultant for Hill and Knowlton and Public Affairs International. He served in both those roles from 1981 to 1992. In 1986 he became a member of the board of directors and later chairman of the board for the Special Waste Management Corporation.

On June 8, 1988, Clark, who had not gone to university, was awarded an honorary doctorate of law by the University of Calgary. Clark would also serve a number of roles in the hockey community in Alberta, Clarke was hired as General Manager for the Olds Grizzlys of the Alberta Junior Hockey League (AJHL) in 1987, and oversaw the team's three consecutive AJHL championships between 1992 and 1994, which included the 1994 Centennial Cup champion team, awarded for the best Junior A team in Canada. Clark would serve as president of the team from 1996 to 1999, and later chairman of the AJHL from 1998 to 2007. He would be enshrined as a member of the Alberta Hockey Hall of Fame in 2020 as a Builder.

Clark died in July 2020 at the age of 83.

== Public servant ==
Clark was appointed the first Alberta Ethics Commissioner by the provincial government in 1992. He served in that post from April 1, 1992, to March 31, 2003.

He also served as Alberta's first Information and Privacy Commissioner from 1995 to 2001. On March 12, 2002, he was appointed Chairman of the Alberta Electoral Boundaries Commission which published the report to serve as the basis for the 2004 Alberta Electoral Boundary Re-distribution.

In 2003 Clark was given the Alberta Lieutenant Governor's Award for his dedication to public service.

After resigning from his post as Alberta Ethics Commissioner he worked as the Ethics Advisor for the Alberta Energy and Utilities Board from 2002 until 2007. Since 2006 he has worked as the Chair of Rural Alberta's Development Fund.

Legislative Assembly of Alberta
Preceded by James Lawrence Owens	MLA Didsbury; 1960–1963	Succeeded by District Abolished
Preceded by New District	MLA Olds-Didsbury; 1963–1981	Succeeded by Gordon Kesler
Preceded by James Henderson	Leader of the Official Opposition in Alberta; 1973–1980	Succeeded by Raymond Speaker
Party political offices
Preceded by Werner Schmidt	Social Credit Party of Alberta Leader; 1975–1980	Succeeded by Rod Sykes
