= Rosebud (provincial electoral district) =

Defunct provincial electoral district in Alberta, Canada

Coordinates: 52°N 113°W

Alberta electoral district

Defunct provincial electoral district
- Legislature: Legislative Assembly of Alberta
- District created: 1905
- District abolished: 1905
- First contested: 1905
- Last contested: 1909

Rosebud was a provincial electoral district in Alberta, Canada, mandated to return a single member to the Legislative Assembly of Alberta from 1905 to 1909.

== History ==
The Rosebud electoral district was one of the original 25 electoral districts contested in the 1905 Alberta general election upon Alberta joining Confederation in September 1905.

The riding was short-lived, however, as it disappeared in 1909 when it was split to form the ridings of Cochrane and Didsbury as well as the north part of Rocky Mountain.

Cornelius Hiebert was elected to the Legislative Assembly of Alberta in the 1905 general election defeating Liberal and future Member of Parliament Michael Clark in a hotly contested three-way race. He was just one of two Conservatives elected to serve in the official opposition that year. Hiebert became the first Mennonite elected to the Alberta Legislature.

== Legislative election results ==
=== 1905 ===
The returning officer for the 1905 election in Rosebud was Herbert B. Adshead.

1905 Alberta general election
Party	Candidate	Votes	%	±%
Conservative	Cornelius Hiebert	589	46.75%	–
Liberal	Michael Clark	545	43.25%	–
Independent	Joseph Reid	126	10.00%	–
Total		1260	–	–
Rejected, spoiled and declined		N/A	–	–
Eligible electors / Turnout		N/A	N/A	–
Conservative pickup new district.				
Source(s) Source: "Rosebud Official Results 1905 Alberta general election". Alberta Heritage Community Foundation.

== See also ==
- List of Alberta provincial electoral districts
- Canadian provincial electoral districts
