= Henry B. Atkins =

Canadian politician 1967–1941)

Henry Burns Atkins
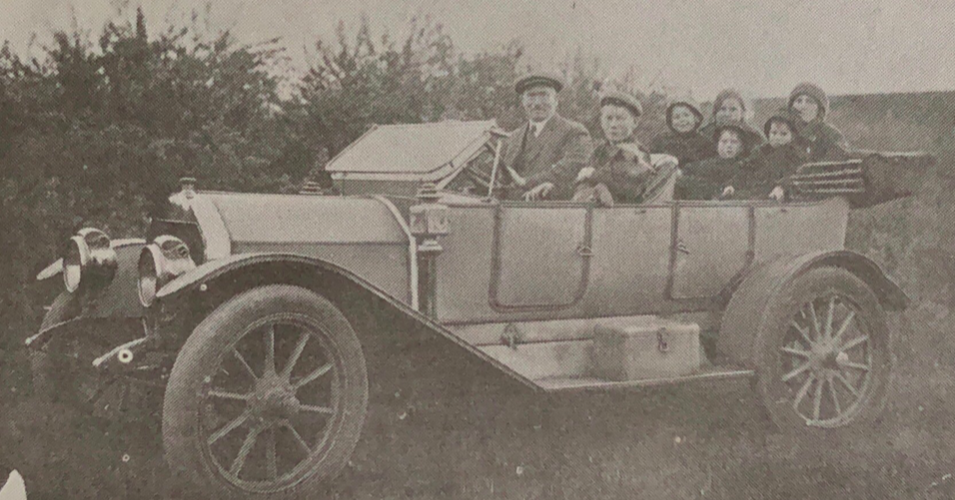
- Atkins family car

Member of the Legislative Assembly of Alberta for Didsbury and Mayor of Didsbury
- In office 1910–1921
- Preceded by: Joseph Stauffer
- Succeeded by: Austin Claypool

Personal details
- Born: July 3, 1867 Leeds, West Yorkshire, England
- Died: September 28, 1941 (aged 74) Cremona, Alberta, Canada
- Party: Liberal
- Spouse(s): Jannet McEachen, Ada Alberta Doak Atkins
- Occupation: Politician, MLA, Mayor, Justice to the Peace, Notary Public

Henry Burns Atkins (July 3, 1867 – September 28, 1941) was a politician, businessman, and farmer from Alberta, Canada.

== Early life and immigration ==
Atkins was born in Leeds, West Yorkshire, England in 1867. He graduated York College in 1885. He immigrated to Canada in 1888. Upon landing in Halifax, he travelled to Alberta where he settled in Cremona. Atkins' pioneer life was lonely and dangerous, and it was necessary for him to keep a gun near his door for survival. Only after several potentially dangerous encounters did he befriend the Indigenous people of the area. Henry Burns would often share meals with them.

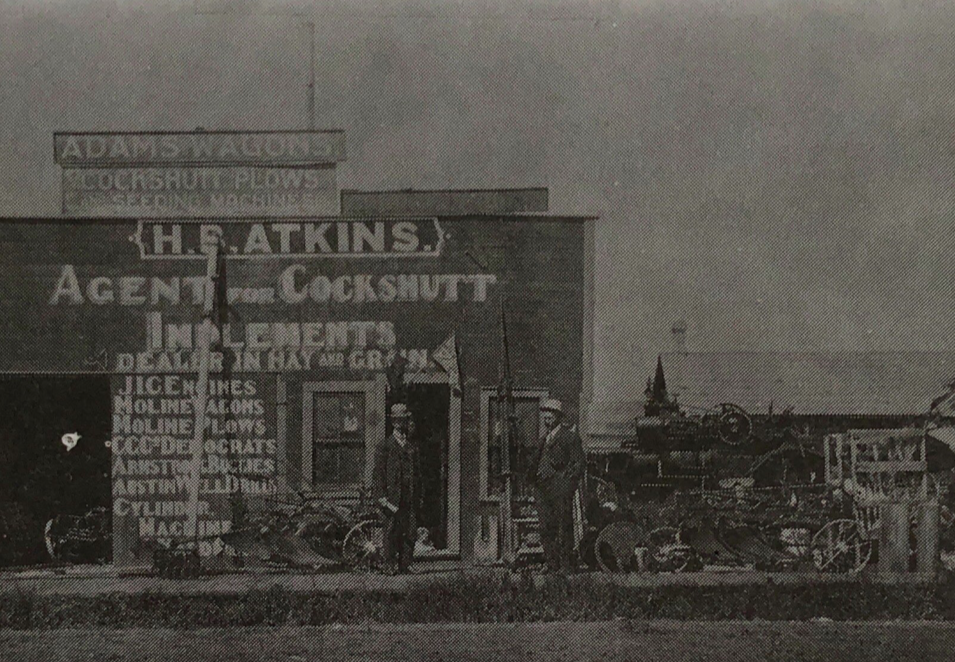
Henry Burns Atkins (right) standing in front of his Grain, Hay, and Implements store in Didsbury.

== Personal life ==
In 1895 he married Jannet McEachen of Scotland. They had two daughters, Mamie and Marjorie, and one son, Henry Jr. Jannet died in 1901, followed by Mamie in 1902. A school was soon constructed and named Atkins school in recognition of Henry's pioneering in the area.

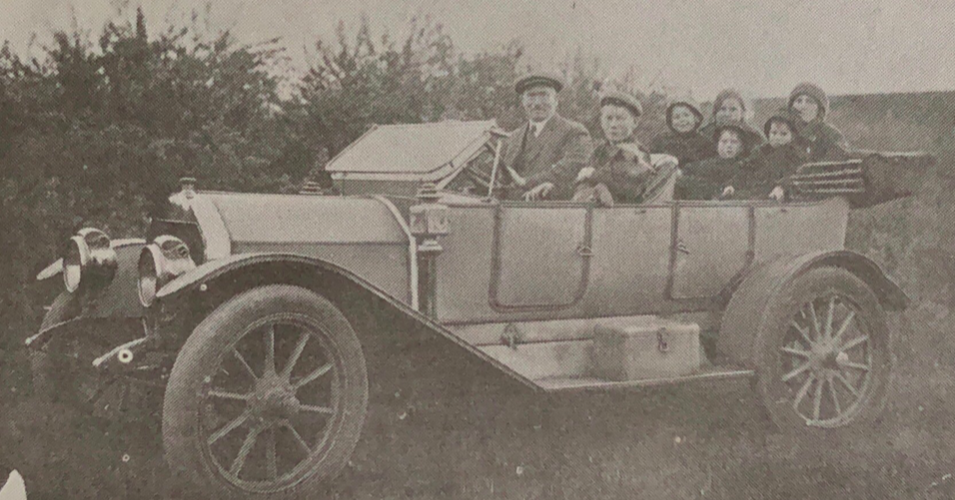
Members of the Atkins family in one of the first cars of the area. (1914)

Shortly thereafter, Henry Burns, with his two children at the time, moved to Didsbury, Alberta. Atkins established a Grain, Hay, and Implements business in 1904. Farmers from miles around would come to purchase equipment and supplies from him. Atkins also owned one of the first cars in the area. While living in Didsbury he still maintained his land in Cremona.

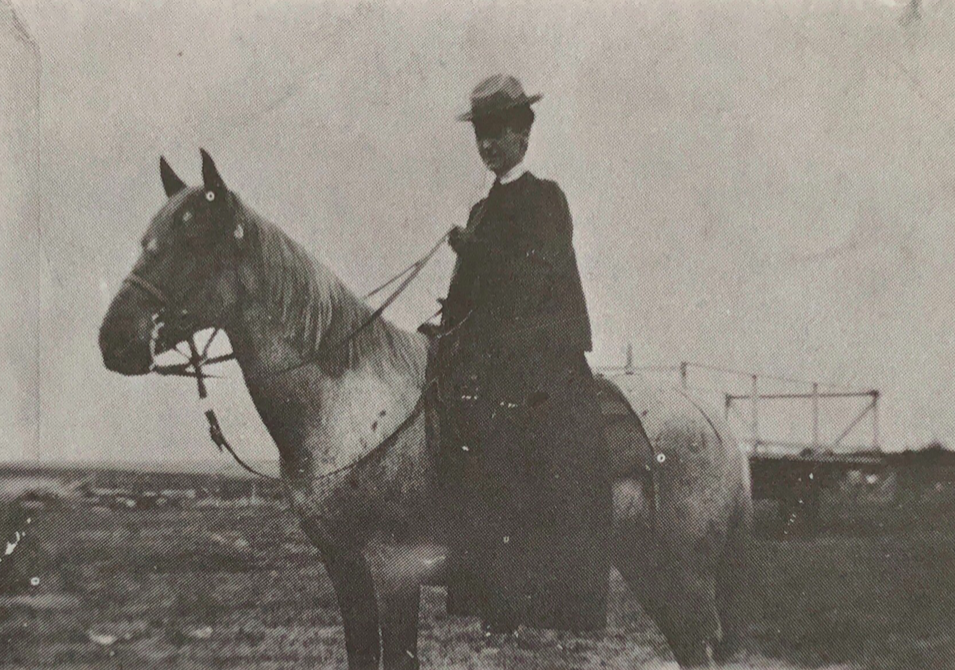
Ada Alberta Doak Atkins riding her horse, Chiff. (1907)

In 1907, he married his second wife, Ada Alberta of Hamilton, Ontario. Ada Alberta was a teacher who had travelled West to visit a friend and stayed. Henry B. and Ada A. had five additional children: John, Eric and Rex (identical twins), Maxwell, and Dorothy.

During the Second World War, Eric, Rex, and Max were Commissioned Officers in the Royal Canadian Air Force. Eric was awarded the Distinguished Flying Cross "for completing numerous operations against the enemy in the course of which he invariably displayed the utmost fortitude, courage and devotion to duty". Rex recovered nicely after a run-in with Malaria while serving in India.

Henry Burns Atkins died in Cremona on September 18, 1941. Ada Alberta Atkins died on April 28, 1945. They were both buried in the Carstairs Cemetery.

== Political career ==
Henry Burns Atkins was a Justice to the Peace and Notary Public for 12 years and a member of the Town Council of Didsbury for four, before being elected mayor of Didsbury in 1910. He served two terms as mayor.

Atkins was then elected to the Legislative Assembly of Alberta for the Alberta Liberal Party in the 1917 Alberta general election. He won the vacant Didsbury electoral district, defeating W.L. Tolton of the Conservative Party by a plurality of 150 votes. Atkins only served a single term in office and did not run again after the legislature was dissolved in 1921.

Legislative Assembly of Alberta
Preceded by Joseph Stauffer	MLA Didsbury; 1917–1921	Succeeded by Austin Claypool
