= Austin Claypool =

Canadian politician (1887–1956)

Austin Bingley Claypool
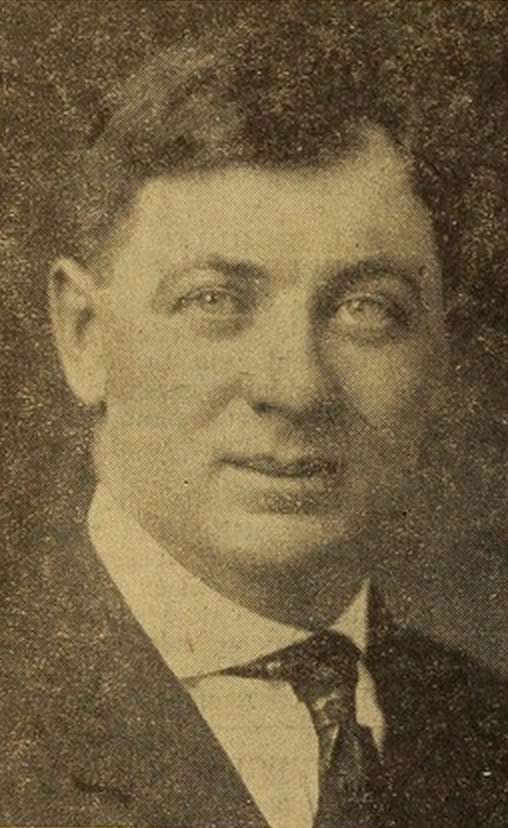

Member of the Legislative Assembly of Alberta
- In office July 18, 1921 – August 22, 1935
- Preceded by: Henry Atkins
- Succeeded by: Edward Foster
- Constituency: Didsbury

Personal details
- Born: April 13, 1887 Muncie, Indiana, U.S.
- Died: June 4, 1956 (aged 69) near Muncie, Indiana
- Party: United Farmers
- Other political affiliations: Liberal
- Occupation: politician

Austin Bingley Claypool (April 13, 1887 – June 4, 1956) was a provincial politician from Alberta, Canada. He served as a member of the Legislative Assembly of Alberta from 1921 to 1935 sitting with the United Farmers caucus in government.

== Political career ==
Claypool ran for a seat to the Alberta Legislature for the first time in the 1921 Alberta general election. He ran as a United Farmers candidate in the electoral district of Didsbury. Claypool defeated Liberal candidate George Webber with a comfortable majority to win the two-way race.

Claypool ran for a second term in the 1926 Alberta general election. The race was contested by three candidates. Claypool won a large majority despite losing some of his popular vote from 1921.

The 1930 Alberta general election would see Claypool stand for his third term. He ran in a two-way race against Independent W.A. Austin and beat him by less than 300 votes to hold his seat.

Claypool ran for a fourth term in the 1935 Alberta general election but was defeated in the four-way race finishing a distant second place to Social Credit candidate Edward Foster.

Claypool made a bid to run for a seat to the House of Commons of Canada in the 1940 federal election. He ran in a five-way race as a Liberal candidate but was defeated finishing a close second to incumbent Charles Johnston.

Claypool died in an automobile crash near his hometown of Muncie, Indiana in 1956.
