= Joseph Stauffer =

Canadian politician (1874–1917)

Joseph Emmett Stauffer
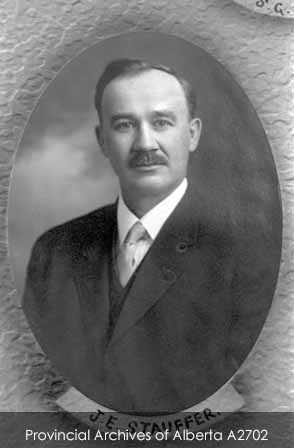

Member of the Legislative Assembly of Alberta for Didsbury
- In office March 22, 1909 – April 10, 1917
- Preceded by: New District
- Succeeded by: Henry B. Atkins

Personal details
- Born: October 29, 1874 Manassas, Virginia, United States
- Died: April 10, 1917 (aged 42) Vimy, France
- Party: Liberal
- Occupation: Teacher, soldier
- Military career
- Allegiance: Canada
- Branch: Canadian Expeditionary Force
- Service years: 1916-1917
- Rank: Lieutenant
- Unit: 50th Battalion

Lieutenant Joseph Emmett Stauffer (October 29, 1874 – April 10, 1917) was a teacher, politician and soldier from Alberta.

== Early life ==
Stauffer was born October 29, 1874, in Manassas, Virginia, to parents of German-Swiss ancestry. He moved to Canada at a young age with his family, and was educated at Berlin, Ontario. He married Emma Ernst. Stauffer worked as a real estate agent, forest ranger, and Homestead Inspector.

== Political career ==
Stauffer was elected to the Alberta Legislature in the 1909 Alberta legislature. In that election he defeated incumbent Cornelius Hiebert in a landslide in the new Didsbury district.

He was re-elected to a second term in office in the 1913 Alberta legislature, winning with a comfortable but reduced plurality.

== Military career ==
Stauffer enlisted in the Canadian Expeditionary Force and served overseas with the Canadian Infantry (Alberta Regiment) 50th Battalion in World War I. He kept his seat in the provincial legislature while he was overseas fighting in the war. On April 10, 1917, he was killed in action during the Battle of Vimy Ridge.

Lieutenant Governor Robert Brett honored Stauffer's memory and military service by making special note in the Throne Speech at the opening of the 4th Alberta Legislative Assembly on February 7, 1918.

The small town of Stauffer, Alberta is named in his honor.

Legislative Assembly of Alberta
Preceded by New District	MLA Didsbury; 1909–1917	Succeeded by Henry B. Atkins
