= Ernest M. Brown =

Canadian politician

Member of the Legislative Assembly of Alberta
- In office 1940–1944
- Preceded by: Edward P. Foster
- Succeeded by: Howard Hammell
- Constituency: Didsbury

Personal details
- Born: December 7, 1890 Elderbank, Nova Scotia
- Died: March 15, 1961 (aged 70) Acme, Alberta
- Party: None (Independent)

Ernest Murray Brown (December 7, 1890 – March 15, 1961) was a provincial politician from Alberta, Canada. He served as the Didsbury Member of the Legislative Assembly of Alberta from 1940 to 1944, sitting as an Independent in government. He was a member of the anti-Social Credit "Unity League" movement.

He did not run for re-election in 1944.
