= Three Hills-Airdrie =

Defunct provincial electoral district in Alberta, Canada

Coordinates: 51.54°N 113.68°W

Alberta electoral district

Defunct provincial electoral district
- Legislature: Legislative Assembly of Alberta
- District created: 1993
- District abolished: 1997
- First contested: 1993
- Last contested: 1993

Three Hills-Airdrie was a provincial electoral district in Alberta, Canada, mandated to return a single member to the Legislative Assembly of Alberta using the first-past-the-post method of voting from 1993 to 1997.

== History ==
The Three Hills-Airdrie electoral district was created in the 1993 electoral district re-distribution from the Three Hills and Drumheller electoral districts. It would only be contested once in the 1993 Alberta general election, and represented by Progressive Conservative MLA Carol Louise Haley. The district was dissolved in the 1997 electoral district re-distribution into the Airdrie-Rocky View and Olds-Didsbury-Three Hills electoral districts.

=== Members of the Legislative Assembly (MLAs) ===
Name	Party	Elected	Left office
See: Three Hills 1963-1993 and Drumheller 1930-1993
Carol Haley	Progressive Conservative	1993	1997
See: Airdrie-Rocky View 1997-2004 and Olds-Didsbury-Three Hills 1997-present

== Boundary history ==
Year	Boundary Change	North	South	East	West
1993	New district	Innisfail-Sylvan Lake and Lacombe-Stettler	Bow Valley and Drumheller.	Olds-Didsbury, Banff-Cochrane, Calgary Nose Creek, Calgary McCall, Calgary Cross, Calgary Montrose and Calgary Shaw.	Highwood.

== Election results ==
=== 1993 ===
1993 Alberta general election
Party	Candidate	Votes	%	±%
Progressive Conservative	Carol Louise Haley	5,666	51.23%	–
Liberal	Don MacDonald	3,783	34.20%	–
New Democratic	Gordon Twigg	553	5.00%	–
Social Credit	Peter Smits	517	4.67%	–
Alliance	George Shenton	424	3.83%	–
Confederation of Regions	Lawrence Lein	118	1.07%	–
Total		11,061	–	–
Rejected, spoiled and declined		30	–	–
Eligible electors / turnout		17,929	61.86%	–
Progressive Conservative pickup new district.				
Source(s) Source: "Three Hills-Airdrie Official Results 1993 Alberta general election". Alberta Heritage Community Foundation.

== See also ==
- List of Alberta provincial electoral districts
- Canadian provincial electoral districts
- Three Hills, a town in Alberta
- Airdrie, a city in Alberta
