= Progressive Group for Independent Business =

- Abbreviation: PGIB
- Formation: 1992; 33 years ago in Burlington, Ontario
- Founder: Craig Chandler
- Chief executive: Craig Chandler
- Website: www.pgib.org

The Progressive Group for Independent Business (PGIB) is a Canadian advocacy group that promotes the interest of small-business owners, entrepreneurs and taxpayers. It is a membership-funded business and taxpayer association in Canada.

The group was founded in 1992 with the goal of promoting the interests of their membership, which consists of small-business owners, entrepreneurs and taxpayers. The firm also offers lobbying services and full-service campaign consulting. Its CEO is Craig Chandler.

== History ==
Since the mid-1990s, the PGIB has claimed to have influenced the development of some of the policies of the Common Sense Revolution platform that elected Progressive Conservative Party of Ontario leader Mike Harris to provincial government. The PGIB also claims that in its 1995 campaign "Focus Federally for Reform" (FFR), it successfully restrained the Reform Party from creating a provincial party in Ontario, thereby splitting the right-wing provincial vote.

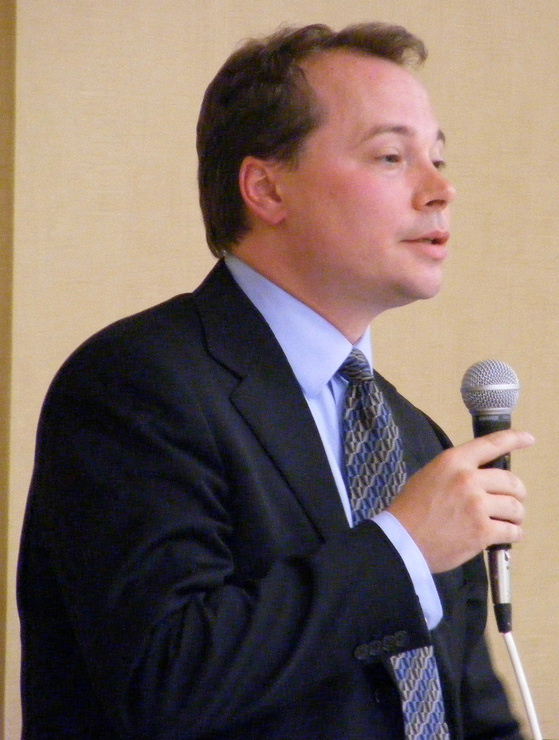
Mark Dyrholm, the Group's National Vice President

In 1998, under the auspices of the PGIB, Chandler organized the "Unite the Right - Roots of Change" conference in Toronto, Ontario. The conference included social conservative delegates from the Reform and Progressive Conservative Parties. It was criticized for also including representatives of the Christian Heritage Party of Canada, Confederation of Regions Party, Freedom Party of Ontario, Renaissance Canada and the Alliance for the Preservation of English in Canada. Attendees also included conservative commentators Michael Coren and Linda Leatherdale.

In 2003, the PGIB launched the "2cards.ca" initiative that called for a United Alternative. Chandler ran as the PGIB candidate in the Progressive Conservative leadership convention, 2003.

In June 2009, Mark Dyrholm, the group's National Vice President and a Calgary chiropractor, ran for the Leadership of the newly formed Wildrose Alliance Party to succeed Paul Hinman in their 2009 Leadership Convention. In the end, Dyrholm lost to Danielle Smith, an Alberta journalist and broadcaster.

In 2022, the group launched an email marketing campaign which targeted small businesses. Despite many complaints, the PGIB made it impossible to be removed from their server lists. Uninterested business owners continue to receive emails from the PGIB.
