= 2009 Wildrose Alliance Party leadership election =

2009 Wildrose Party leadership election
- Date: June 6, 2009
- Convention: Edmonton, Alberta
- Resigning leader: Paul Hinman
- Won by: Danielle Smith
- Ballots: 1
- Candidates: 2

The 2009 leadership election for the Wildrose Alliance Party of Alberta began on June 6, 2009, when leader Paul Hinman officially announced his resignation as leader of the party. This was the third leadership convention for the party under its banners since 2002.

== Announcement ==
In April 2009, Hinman announced his intention to resign at the party's annual general meeting, held June 6. Hinman remained as interim leader of the party until the selection of the next leader in October.

Three candidates declared their candidacy for the position: Danielle Smith, Jeff Willerton and Mark Dyrholm. Smith was chosen as leader on October 17, in Edmonton.

== Candidates ==
=== Mark Dyrholm ===
Mark Dyrholm is the National Vice President for the Progressive Group for Independent Business (PGIB). He is also a chiropractor.

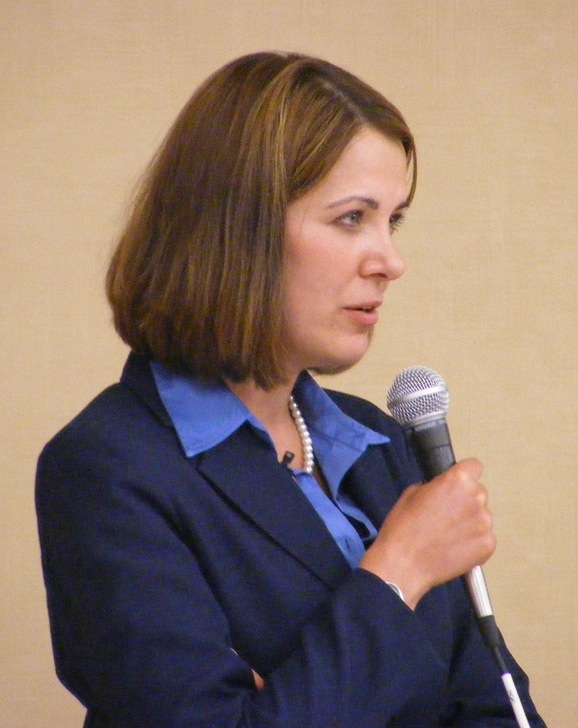
Danielle Smith

=== Danielle Smith ===
Danielle Smith is an Alberta journalist, broadcaster, business lobbyist and property rights advocate. Until recently she was the Alberta Director for the Canadian Federation of Independent Business. In May 2009 Smith announced her intention to seek the party's leadership. She was named one of Calgary's "Top 40 Under 40" in 2004.

== Candidates that Withdrew ==
=== Jeff Willerton ===
Jeff Willerton is an author and entrepreneur, worked for three years with the Canadian Taxpayers Federation, author of the book, FIX CANADA or Lose It. A five time provincial election candidate.

At a leadership forum in Calgary on September 16, Willerton announced that he is stepping out of the leadership race and will be supporting Mark Dyrholm.

== Results ==
On October 17, 2009, Danielle Smith was chosen as the leader of the Wildrose Alliance Party of Alberta.

First Ballot
Candidate	Votes	%
Danielle Smith	6,295	76.77
Mark Dyrholm	1,905	23.23
Total	8,200	100

There were 97 spoiled ballots. Turnout was 71.5%
