= Danielle Smith =

Premier of Alberta since 2022

The Honourable Danielle Smith ECA MLA
- Smith in 2025

19th Premier of Alberta
- Incumbent
- Assumed office October 11, 2022
- Monarch: Charles III
- Lieutenant Governor: Salma Lakhani
- Deputy: Kaycee Madu; Nathan Neudorf; Mike Ellis
- Preceded by: Jason Kenney

Leader of the United Conservative Party
- Incumbent
- Assumed office October 6, 2022
- Preceded by: Jason Kenney

Leader of the Opposition in Alberta
- In office April 24, 2012 – December 17, 2014
- Premier: Alison Redford; Dave Hancock; Jim Prentice
- Deputy: Rob Anderson
- Preceded by: Raj Sherman
- Succeeded by: Heather Forsyth

Leader of the Wildrose Party
- In office October 17, 2009 – December 17, 2014
- Deputy: Rob Anderson
- Preceded by: Paul Hinman
- Succeeded by: Heather Forsyth (interim)

Member of the Legislative Assembly of Alberta
- Incumbent
- Assumed office November 8, 2022
- Preceded by: Michaela Frey
- Constituency: Brooks-Medicine Hat
- In office April 23, 2012 – May 5, 2015
- Preceded by: George Groeneveld
- Succeeded by: Wayne Anderson
- Constituency: Highwood

Personal details
- Born: Marlaina Danielle Smith; April 1, 1971 (age 55) Calgary, Alberta, Canada
- Party: United Conservative (2017–present)
- Other political affiliations: Progressive Conservative (1998–2009; 2014–2017); Wildrose (2009–2014)
- Spouses: Sean McKinsley (divorced); David Moretta (m. 2006)
- Education: University of Calgary (BA)
- Occupation: Politician; radio host
- Website: www.daniellesmith.ca

Marlaina Danielle Smith (born April 1, 1971) is a Canadian politician, former lobbyist, former columnist and media personality who has served as the 19th premier of Alberta and leader of the United Conservative Party (UCP) since 2022.

Born in Calgary, Smith attended the University of Calgary and earned degrees in English and economics. After briefly serving as a trustee for the Calgary Board of Education, she worked as a journalist in print, radio and television, offering opinions on politics and healthcare. During this period she also worked as the director of provincial affairs for Alberta with the Canadian Federation of Independent Business. Smith entered provincial politics in 2009 when she became the leader of the Wildrose Party. She contributed to the growth of the party and led it in the 2012 general election, in which it became the Official Opposition with her winning the seat of Highwood in the Legislative Assembly. Smith served as Leader of the Opposition until resigning in 2014 to join the governing Progressive Conservative Association of Alberta (PCs). She was defeated in her bid for the PC nomination in Highwood for the 2015 general election.

Between 2015 and 2022, Smith worked in talk radio and served as the president of the Alberta Enterprise Group. After Premier Jason Kenney announced his resignation in May 2022, Smith announced her candidacy for the United Conservative Party leadership election. On October 6, Smith won the leadership on the sixth ballot. She was sworn in as premier on October 11, and became the MLA for Brooks-Medicine Hat after a by-election on November 8. She led the UCP to re-election with a reduced majority government in the 2023 general election.

Smith's policies have primarily focused on extending Albertan provincial autonomy. In 2022, her government passed the Alberta Sovereignty Act, which seeks to protect Alberta from federal policies it deems detrimental to the province. Smith's government has also proposed an Alberta Pension Plan to replace the Canada Pension Plan and announced a referendum featuring ten questions, including one on separating from Canada.

== Early life and education ==
Marlaina Danielle Smith was born in Calgary on April 1, 1971, the second of five children. She is the daughter of Sharon (Hawkins) and Doug Smith, an oilfield consultant and previously a board member for the Wildrose Party. She is named after the 1970 song "Marlena" by The Four Seasons. Her paternal great-grandfather, Philipus Kolodnicki, a Ruthenian from Austria, changed his surname to Smith after arriving in Canada in the early 20th century. Her maternal ancestors came to Canada via the United States. In 2022, Smith's claims of "mixed-race ancestry" and indigenous ancestry on her maternal side were questioned.

Growing up, her family lived in subsidized housing. As a student she worked at McDonald's, at a bingo parlour and at restaurants bussing tables.

Smith described her parents as "reliably conservative" in an interview with the National Post. When Smith was in grade 8, she said she came home praising a teacher who spoke positively about communism, and her father argued otherwise. Smith said she had family in Ukraine, which was part of the Soviet Union before 1991. "Then he realized we needed to talk a lot more around the dinner table," Smith told The Canadian Press in 2014.

She is also a past member of the Girl Guides of Canada and was featured in a 2013 museum exhibit about prominent Girl Guides at the Red Deer Museum and Art Gallery. She is a fan of the young-adult fantasy novel Eragon by Christopher Paolini, and once considered becoming a novelist in the science fiction and fantasy genres.

Smith attended the University of Calgary and earned a Bachelor of Arts degree in English in 1993 and economics in 1995. The university had a strong culture of conservative and progressive political activism and debate when Smith was a student. Her classmates included Ezra Levant; Rob Anders; Naheed Nenshi; and Kevin Bosch, who became an adviser to prime ministers Paul Martin and Justin Trudeau. One of her classes was taught by former Alberta Premier Peter Lougheed. The same class had Ian Brodie, who became chief of staff for Prime Minister Stephen Harper, as a teachers' aide. She was active in the campus Progressive Conservatives and was eventually elected president of the club.

It also was at the University of Calgary where she met Tom Flanagan, a conservative political activist from the Calgary School and advisor, who was a professor in the political science department while Smith studied economics. In 1996, Flanagan recommended Smith for a one-year public policy internship with the Fraser Institute. During her time here, she coauthored a report promoting global warming skepticism called "Environmental Indicators for Canada and the United States" with Boris DeWiel, Steven F. Hayward, and Laura Jones - which sought to "separate the facts from alarmist misinformation" and "bring balance to the environmental debate". The report argued that "contrary to public opinion, in most instances objectives for protecting human health and the environment are being met, pollution and waste are being controlled, and resources and land are being sustainably and effectively managed".

Flanagan later became her campaign manager during the 2012 Alberta general election. Smith also became involved in political campaigning and met her first husband, Sean McKinsley. After graduating with an English major, Smith briefly lived in Vancouver where she worked as a waitress and as an extra in movie and TV productions.

== Early political and media career ==
=== Calgary Board of Education ===
In 1998, Smith entered politics when she ran for the board of trustees of the Calgary Board of Education. She won, but less than a year later, the chairwoman complained that the board had become dysfunctional. In response, the provincial Minister of Learning, Lyle Oberg, dismissed the entire board after 11 months into their term.

Years later, Smith said she had been far too strident during her tenure as a board trustee and said the experience taught her to be more tolerant of those with whom she disagreed. Subsequently, Smith pursued work as an advocate for ranchers, farmers and other rural landowners with the Alberta Property Rights Initiative and the Canadian Property Rights Research Institute. During her time at the Canadian Property Rights Research Institute, she coauthored a paper on endangered species.

=== Career as Calgary Herald columnist and talk radio host ===
After her time as a school board trustee Smith joined the Calgary Herald as a columnist with the editorial board. During the 1999–2000 writers' strike at the Herald, she crossed the picket line as a strikebreaker writer for the paper, which was owned by Conrad Black at the time. Her columns included coverage of city hall and health reform, but also ventured into other topics. In 2003, she wrote a column supporting the legalisation of sex work and proposed the creation of a red-light district in Calgary. That same year, she also wrote an article titled "Anti-smoking lobby does more harm than good", in which she stated that smoking cigarettes can "reduce the risk of disease".

She then went on to succeed Charles Adler as host of the national current affairs program Global Sunday, a Sunday-afternoon interview show on Global Television. She also hosted two talk radio programs focused on health policy and property rights.

She met her second husband, David Moretta, who was an executive producer with Global Television at the time and would go on to be a former executive producer with Sun Media.

In 2004, Smith was named one of Calgary's "Top 40 Under 40".

In September 2006, she co-hosted the Calgary Congress, a national assembly of citizens and economic and constitutional specialists to consider basic federal reforms for Canada.

Smith was hired by the Canadian Federation of Independent Business in 2006, becoming a provincial director for Alberta. While employed there, she coauthored a paper called "Achieving Eco-prosperity"

== Early provincial political career (2009–2015) ==
During the 2006 PC leadership election, Smith supported Ted Morton. Morton lost to Ed Stelmach, and Smith became increasingly disillusioned with what she called Stelmach's "free-spending ways". She cited the 2008 provincial budget as the point where she determined that Stelmach's government had 'lost its way'.

=== Wildrose Party ===
Smith quit the PC party in 2009 and joined the Wildrose Alliance. The Tories sent MLA Rob Anderson, one of the more fiscally conservative members of their caucus, to talk Smith out of it. Years later, Smith recalled that Anderson told her that despite the Tories' reckless spending and unwillingness to listen to the backbench, they were the only credible centre-right party in the province. Smith refused to stay, saying that there was no hope of restoring Alberta to fiscal sanity under the Tories, and that the Wildrose was the only credible chance at electing a fiscally conservative government. As far as she was concerned, she told Anderson, "This [Tory] government is beyond redemption. It's out of control."

Later that year, Smith was recruited by Wildrose officials to run for the leadership of the party. During the course of the leadership campaign outgoing leader Paul Hinman won in a by-election in the riding of Calgary-Glenmore. His win meant he was one of four in the Wildrose caucus; by the time Smith was elected leader on October 17, 2009, support for the party had quadrupled since the 2008 election. After Smith was elected leader, support for the Wildrose Party continued to grow. Smith convinced three PCs who served in government to cross the floor to join the Wildrose Party: Rob Anderson and Heather Forsyth, and later Guy Boutiller.

In early 2011, she was featured in an episode of CBC Television's Make the Politician Work.

=== 2012 election ===
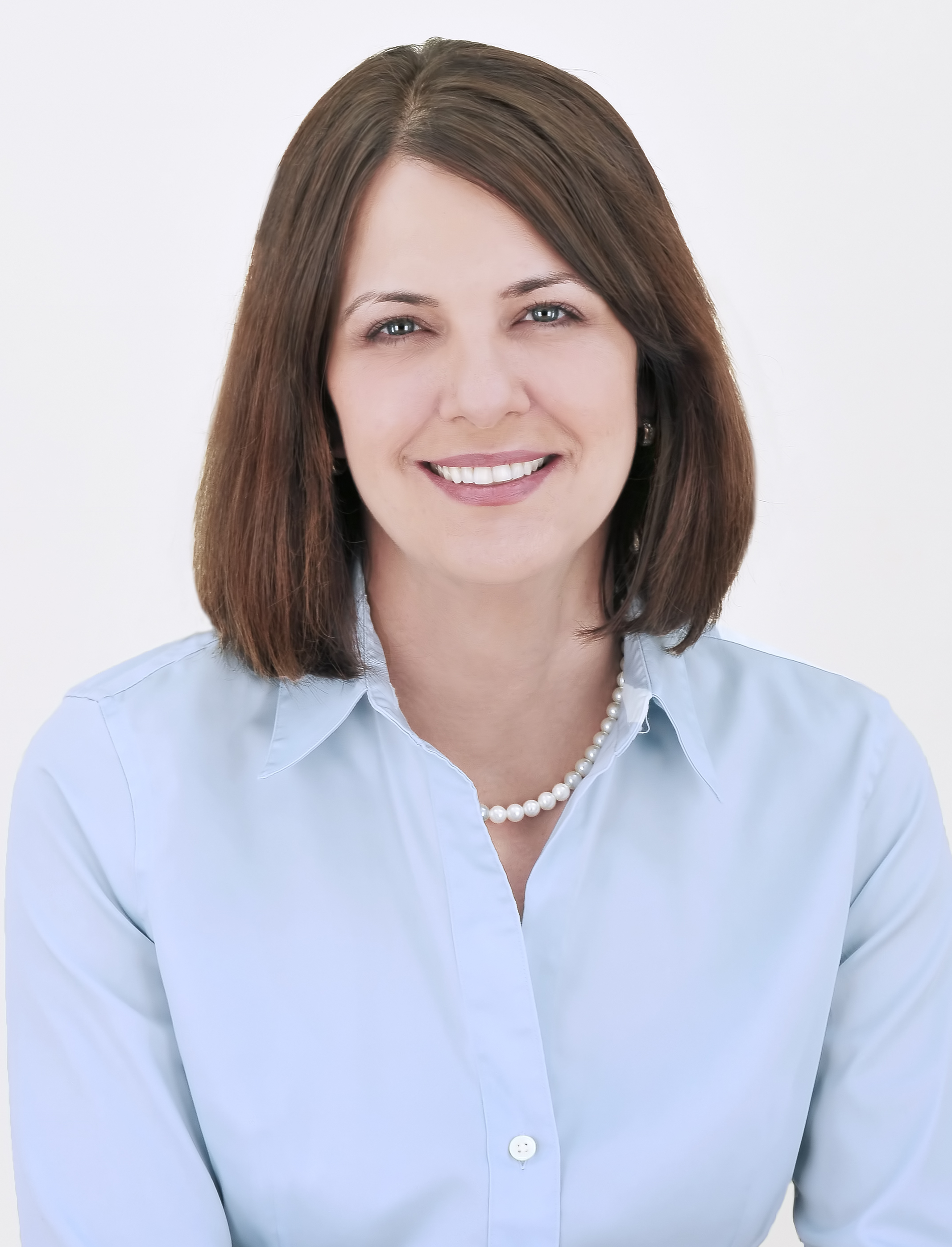
Smith in 2012

Numerous polls indicated that the Wildrose Party could defeat the governing Progressive Conservatives, led by Premier Alison Redford. The PCs had governed the province since 1971, the second-longest unbroken run in government at the provincial level.

The Wildrose Party won 17 seats on 34.3% of the popular vote, and took over Official Opposition status from the Alberta Liberal Party. Smith was elected to the Legislature from Highwood, just south of Calgary, on the same day, defeating John Barlow, editor of the Okotoks Western Wheel and two other candidates.

Political pundits suggested Wildrose lost their early polling lead over the Progressive Conservatives due to Smith's defence of two Wildrose candidates who had made controversial remarks. Allan Hunsperger, running in an Edmonton riding, had written a blog post claiming that gays would end up in a "lake of fire" if they did not renounce their lifestyle. Ron Leech had claimed he would have a leg up on the competition in his Calgary riding because he was white. According to the National Post, Hunsperger and Leech's extreme views, as well as Smith's refusal to condemn them, cost her a chance of unseating Redford. Ultimately, Wildrose was denied victory mainly because it was unable to get any foothold in the urban areas. It won only two seats in Calgary and was completely shut out in Edmonton.

In appraising the election results at the Wildrose 2012 annual general meeting, Smith advocated freezing out candidates who cannot respectfully communicate their views in future elections. Smith asked members to adopt a forward-looking policy platform for the next election.

=== Rejoining the Progressive Conservative Party ===
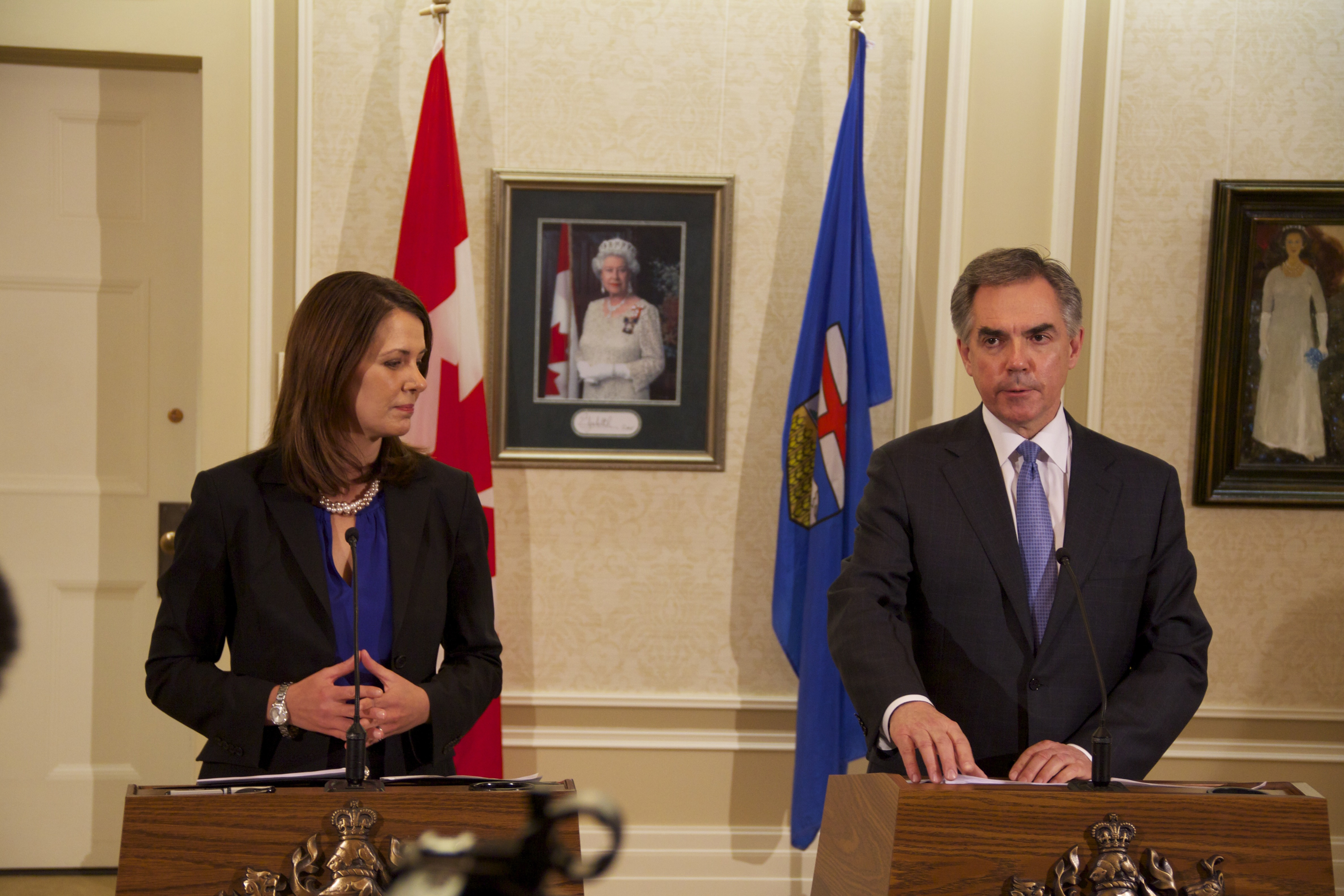
Smith and Jim Prentice announcing that she and eight other Wildrose MLAs would be crossing the floor to join the Progressive Conservatives.

After Redford left politics in the spring of 2014 due to allegations of corruption, the Wildrose party was initially the major beneficiary. But this momentum stalled when former federal cabinet minister Jim Prentice became PC leader and premier. Under Prentice, the PCs swept four by-elections in October. Smith was dealt a second blow at the Wildrose annual general meeting, when an anti-discrimination resolution she strongly supported was voted down while she was out of the room. Smith told CBC News that the defeat of the anti-discrimination resolution led her to consider returning to the PCs.

On December 17, 2014, Smith announced that she, deputy leader Rob Anderson, and seven other Wildrose MLAs were crossing the floor to join the PCs. Smith had criticized two other Wildrose MLAs for defecting to the PCs a month earlier; she had publicly said, "there'll be no more floor crossings." But it was later revealed that Smith and Prentice had been in talks about a possible merger for months. Smith said that several conversations with Prentice revealed that they shared much common ground, particularly on fiscal issues. Ultimately, she concluded that it made little sense for her to continue in opposition. "If you're going to be the official Opposition leader," she said, "you have to really want to take down the government and really take down the premier. I don't want to take down this premier. I want this premier to succeed." Several weeks after Smith joined the Progressive Conservatives, in a Facebook post, she apologized for the anger her move caused and for not consulting with Albertans before making the decision. At the same time, she stood by her decision to "unify conservatives" in the province and said she intended to seek the Progressive Conservative nomination in Highwood for the next election.

Smith was defeated in her bid for the PC nomination in Highwood by Okotoks Councillor Carrie Fischer on March 28, 2015. Smith's defeat was attributed to her floor-crossing, which angered many in her constituency. Fischer lost to Wildrose candidate Wayne Anderson in the general election.

== Out of politics (2015–2022) ==
=== Talk radio ===
In the intervening period, Smith hosted a talk radio program on CHQR in Calgary.On January 11, 2021, she announced that she was leaving her talk show and Twitter, citing attacks from Twitter trolls, effective February 19, 2021.

In March 2018, wrote an opinion article supporting the defunding of public schools. In July 2021, Smith wrote an opinion article supporting Jason Kenney's referendum on equalization payments, held on October 18, 2021.

=== Career as a lobbyist ===
In June 2019, Smith registered as a lobbyist for the Alberta Enterprise Group, an association where Smith was also the president. At that time Smith lobbied the provincial government on behalf of industry for the RStar program.

=== UCP leadership race ===
On May 18, 2022, Smith announced that she was launching a campaign to seek the leadership of the United Conservative Party of Alberta, after the resignation of sitting premier and UCP leader Jason Kenney. Smith was perceived to be the frontrunner among party members in the race to replace Kenney according to internal polling released to the Calgary Sun.

Smith's central policy was to enact what she called the Alberta Sovereignty Act if she became premier. The proposal argued for more autonomy for Alberta in Confederation and called on the provincial legislature to make determinations on when to ignore federal legislation infringing upon Alberta's jurisdiction. Six of Smith's opponents in the leadership race criticized the act. Jason Kenney described it as a "full-frontal attack on the rule of law", as well as a step towards separation and a "banana republic". Smith told the separatist Alberta Prosperity Project that one of her first steps would be to court them, arguing that they had power due to the separatists joining the party.

On October 6, Smith won the UCP leadership vote with 53.77% of the vote on the sixth count—the contest was conducted using instant-runoff voting—to become the premier-designate. She was sworn in as the 19th premier and minister of Intergovernmental Relations on October 11. Preceded by Herbert Greenfield, William Aberhart and Jim Prentice in this regard, she was the last in a series of persons who ascended to the premier's position without holding a seat in the legislature.

Smith's campaign ran a deficit of $26,792 after spending $1,389,829 on her successful campaign.

== Premier of Alberta (2022–present) ==
=== 30th Alberta Legislature ===
After being sworn in as premier, Smith said that she would not impose any further measures to control the COVID-19 pandemic in Alberta. She also said that people who are unvaccinated should be protected under the Alberta Human Rights Act; alluding to COVID-19 vaccine mandates, she said that they have been "the most discriminated against group that I've ever witnessed in my lifetime", had "faced the most restrictions on their freedoms in the last year", and that "we are not going to create a segregated society on the basis of a medical choice". The remarks faced criticism for alleged trivialization of discrimination faced by minority groups, for which Smith did not apologize.

On October 24, Smith pulled Alberta from the World Economic Forum Global Coalition for Value in Healthcare, saying that she would not "work with a group that talks about controlling governments." "I find it distasteful when billionaires brag about how much control they have over political leaders," she said.

As Smith was not a member of the Legislative Assembly when she became premier, she ran in a by-election for the southern Alberta seat of Brooks-Medicine Hat on November 8, 2022. The incumbent, fellow UCP MLA Michaela Frey, resigned soon after Smith was elected leader and premier, and had encouraged Smith to run. Longstanding convention in Westminster systems when the leader of the governing party is not a member of the legislature to either hold a general election or a by-election, often caused by a sitting member in a safe seat resigning in order to allow the newly elected leader a chance to enter the legislature. Smith had previously announced plans to seek the UCP nomination in Livingstone-Macleod, before she was elected party leader. She won the by-election with 54.5% of the vote.

In late November 2022, Smith withdrew her plan to introduce a bill that would add unvaccinated individuals as a protected class under the Alberta Human Rights Act; Smith continued to promote an intent for herself and her ministers to contact businesses and organizations that were still "discriminating" via COVID-19 vaccine mandates and ask them to "reconsider their vaccination policy in the light of new evidence". She said, "most employers have made the responsible decision to not discriminate against their workers", and for people to inform their MLAs "If there is still discrimination". In December 2022 the legislature passed the Alberta Sovereignty Within a United Canada Act.

In May 2023 as wildfires swept the province and a state of emergency was declared, Smith was asked about the UCP government's cuts to the firefighting budget. Between 10 and 20 per cent of the watchtowers by the 2019 budget, and the Aerial Rapattack fire service team was terminated. The firefighting budget was cut from $130 million in 2018–19 to $100 million in 2023-24 and the contingency fund for "wildfire fighting" was treated as a political football.

The Alberta ethics commissioner started investigating Smith in April 2023 for her alleged interference with the administration of justice. Smith had previously promised pardons for those guilty of COVID-19 violations and indicated she was in regular contact with Crown prosecutors. In May 2023 the ethics commissioner found that Smith had contravened the Conflict of Interest Act by discussing criminal charges against Calgary pastor Artur Pawlowski with the justice minister Tyler Shandro and with Pawlowski himself.

=== 31st Alberta Legislature ===
In the May 2023 Alberta general election, Smith led the UCP to a second consecutive majority government, albeit with a reduced majority, defeating the New Democratic Party led by Rachel Notley. The election campaign was close and one of the fiercest in Alberta's history. Smith was reelected in her riding. Although the UCP's share of the vote declined only slightly (from 55% to 53%), the opposition vote coalesced behind the NDP, which resulted in a loss of 11 seats for the UCP. Notably, the UCP came in second place in Calgary, which had been a power base for the centre-right in Alberta for years, and failed to win any seats in Edmonton. But the UCP won all but four seats outside Edmonton and Calgary. Smith thus became the third woman to lead a party to a win in an Alberta general election, after Redford and Notley.

On August 3, 2023, the Smith government announced that it was pausing all approvals in the province renewable energy industry for six months. On February 28, 2024, Smith announced further restrictions on renewable energy development. Mike Law, the CEO of the independent Alberta Electric System Operator, was opposed to the moratorium because it would send a "closed-for-business message" and send investments into a "tailspin." Law was later replaced. Smith also claimed that Alberta Utilities Commission and Rural Municipalities of Alberta both supported her decision to pause development. However, both organizations denied it. The Business Renewables Centre-Canada revealed that corporate renewable energy investment is down 99% compared to 2023 and that Nova Scotia over Alberta is the country leader in corporate power purchase agreements in 2025.

A news-leak on December 18, 2023, revealed allegations of an ongoing ethics probe into restructuring at Alberta Health Services, including the rapid hiring and firing of Deena Hinshaw for a position on their Indigenous Wellness Core team just days before starting. One physician at Alberta Health Services resigned in protest, claiming 'political interference from Danielle Smith's office', and a letter signed by over 200 physicians called for an investigation into the matter.

In November 2024, Smith won a mandatory leadership review by UCP members attending convention with 91.5% of the vote, and only 4633 ballots cast. By comparison, she won with a much more narrow margin of 53% in the 2022 leadership race, and over 80,000 ballots were cast.

In January 2025, She visited Trump at his Mar-a-Lago resort. She was scheduled to attend Trump's inauguration, but was unable because the event was moved into a small indoor venue due to bad weather. On March 20, 2025, it was revealed that Smith did an interview with Breitbart two weeks before in which she said that she pressed the Trump administration to pause the implementation of tariffs as a way for Conservative leader Pierre Poilievre to be elected as Prime Minister. Smith said that she had reasoned that the implementation of the tariffs would benefit the Liberal Party of Canada polling numbers and that Poilievre would be more in line with the Trump administration.

In February 2025, The Globe and Mail obtained a letter from lawyers of Athana Mentzelopoulos, the former head of Alberta Health Services, that the Smith government dismissed her two days before she was scheduled to meet with the province's auditor-general to discuss her investigation into inflated procurement contracts and contracting processes. Mentzelopoulos also alleged that the premier's then-chief of staff, Marshall Smith, interfered in AHS contract negotiations. Mentzelopoulos was investigating AHS's relationship and contracts with MHCare, a company owned by Sam Mraiche, who imported children's medicine from Turkey, and Alberta Surgical Group (ASG), a private surgical outlet. Doug Wylie, the auditor-general, said that he is examining procurement and contracting processes within AHS. Smith later called the allegations troubling but denied them. In March, the RCMP launched an investigation after a complaint was raised, a year later they executed search warrants into MHCare's headquarters. In April, former Infrastructure minister Peter Guthrie, who was dismissed from caucus two weeks earlier over his criticism of the government's lack of transparency surrounding the allegations, sent the auditor-general meeting notes that he kept as evidence that Smith and Health minister Adriana LaGrange misled cabinet.

On May 26, 2025, Smith announced her intention to ban books containing "sexual content" from school libraries in Alberta. A list of books to be banned was provided for by anti-LGBTQ groups Parents for Choice in Education (a parental rights group) and Action4Canada. The book ban was to be implemented for October 1 but was put on pause on September 2 after backlash arose when the Edmonton's public school board complied a list of 200 titles that would need to be removed.

During the 2025 Calgary Stampede, Smith signed a non-binding agreement with the Ontario government to reduce interprovincial trade barriers in the midst of the United States trade war with Canada.

In July 2025, a report was published about the 2024 Jasper wildfire, stating the Alberta government hindered firefighting efforts with constant requests for information and by seeking to exercise decision-making authority, despite not being jurisdictionally responsible. The report stated the interference disrupted the focus of incident commanders and forced them to spend time managing inquiries and issues instead of fighting the fire and leading the re-entry of residents, resulting in more damage being caused that could have otherwise been prevented. Smith demanded the report be retracted and that the fire-stricken town of Jasper apologize for it, with Jasper mayor Richard Ireland responding that they would stand by the report and not retract it.

On September 29, 2025, the Alberta Teachers' Association (ATA) announced a teachers' strike as a result of multiple disagreements with Smith's government over the terms of a new labour contract. The strike began on October 6 with 51,000 union members on strike. Due to the strike, all public education classes were cancelled, impacting 730,000 students, and 2,500 public, separate, and francophone schools. After the strike announcement, multiple rallies were organized across Alberta (primarily in Calgary and Edmonton), mainly to support educators. A notable rally occurred on October 5 at the Alberta Legislature Building, where thousands of people attended. Smith ordered teachers back to work on October 29, following the passage of the Back to School Act (Bill 2), which invokes the notwithstanding clause. Because of this, teachers are not permitted to strike until August 31, 2028, when the legislation expires.

In October and November 2025, Smith and a few members of her staff travelled to Saudi Arabia and the United Arab Emirates to discuss potential collaborations on energy development and artificial intelligence. This trip was revealed publicly in March 2026 by Opposition NDP leader Naheed Nenshi, who got Smith to confirm that she travelled on a private plane on behalf of the Saudi government during a legislature committee.

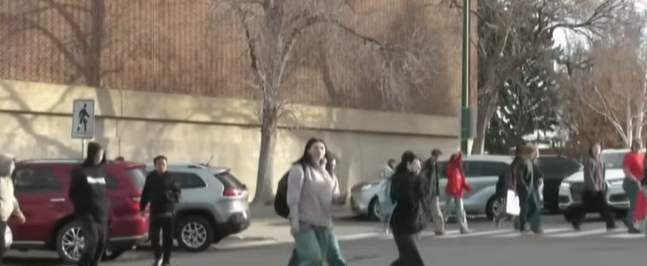
Albertan students participating in walkouts to support teachers.

In November 2025, Smith reached a deal with Prime Minister Mark Carney to build an oil pipeline from Alberta to the British Columbia Coast. Opposed by British Columbia's David Eby and most local First Nations, the memorandum of understanding (MOU) exempted the project from climate legislation such as the greenhouse gas emissions cap, but mandated that Alberta invest in a carbon capture system for the Athabasca oil sands. In May 2026, Carney and Smith agreed on a carbon pricing system and a timeline for pipeline construction.

On December 10, 2025, a recall petition was approved, seeking to remove Smith from office, bringing the total number of recall petitions for UCP members to 18. Because of this, Smith became the first premier in nearly 90 years (after William Aberhart) to face a citizen recall. The petitioner, Heather VanSnick, claimed that Smith did not live in the community she represents and had not made efforts to communicate with her constituents since taking office. The petitioners had three months to collect signatures equalling 60% of the number of votes cast in the constituency in 2023, and if successful, a vote would have been held on Smith retaining her seat. The petition gathered close to 2,300 signatures but it needed at least 12,000 to be successful.

In January 2026, Alberta's three chief justices issued a public statement emphasizing judicial independence after Smith made remarks stating her wish to "direct" them. In February 2026, Smith admitted in a radio interview that there will be ‘significant’ deficit when the budget will be revealed due to lower oil royalties prices but ruled out rules out tax hikes and big cuts. Smith later announced an October 2026 provincial referendum on nine questions, including immigration and Constitutional changes

On May 21, 2026, Smith announced a tenth referendum question, on whether Alberta should remain within Canada or pursue a path toward a binding referendum on separating from Canada. On August 21, The Globe and Mail reported Smith told UCP townhall attendees in Red Deer in July and Lethbridge in August that if the separatists won the vote on October 19, there would be a binding referendum in the spring of 2027. Smith said "We have to settle it before the next election" scheduled for October 2027, and that the First Nations consultation process would take 2.5 months. The same article includes an observation from an advisor to First Nations groups that Smith underestimates the time required to properly consult on an issue as complex as separation. The results, saw the independence referendum fail but Albertans voted to approve eight of the 9 other measures proposed. If put into effect the proposed measures supported by the voters would require citizenship to vote, fight federal equalization power, support the supremacy of provincial law over conflicting federal law, and restrict immigration and immigrants access to state benefits. Smith publicly opposed Alberta separatist's referendum on the question of independence. She expressed her pleasure with the results, stating it was time to "move forward together as a strong and free Alberta within a united Canada".

== Political views and public image ==
Smith has been described as "libertarian on moral issues" by The Globe and Mail in 2012, a "populist Conservative" by Politico in 2023, "far-right" by The New York Times in 2023 and a "political chameleon" by Maclean's in 2026. In a 2023 interview with the Calgary Sun, she self-identified as a "caring conservative". Smith has been described as media-savvy and adept at presenting a professional and polished image.

Smith shared a mentor, political scientist Tom Flanagan, with former Reform Party leader Preston Manning and former prime minister Stephen Harper. She has an affinity with Manning's movement and Harper's government. Smith distanced herself and the Wildrose Party from Flanagan in February 2013 after he made controversial remarks on child pornography. She is also an admirer of Ayn Rand, John Locke, Margaret Thatcher, Ron DeSantis, and Kristi Noem. She viewed former Alberta NDP Premier Rachel Notley as the inheritor of former Progressive Conservative Premier Peter Lougheed legacy.

=== Covid-19 ===
Smith has been criticized for making false claims about E. coli as a cure for COVID-19, and statements that critics said blamed stage-4 cancer patients for their diagnosis. She has since apologised for making statements on E. coli and said her statements on cancer were meant to express that preventative health measures are an important means to help combat cancer. Smith also made posts on Locals.com critical of COVID-19 vaccines, and said in an interview that the COVID-19 vaccine "doesn't work very well".

In an interview on November 10, 2021, Smith said she was not wearing a Remembrance Day poppy because politicians and public health officials had "ruined it for her" by taking away Canadians' freedoms through public health measures during the COVID-19 pandemic in Canada, and that citizens who went along with public health measures and were vaccinated had fallen for the "charms of a tyrant" in the same way that Germans had fallen for Adolf Hitler. She elaborated, "That's the test here, is we've seen it. We have 75 per cent of the public who say not only hit me, but hit me harder, and keep me away from those dirty unvaxxed." When the interview resurfaced in 2023, Smith apologized, writing, "As everyone knows, I was against the use of vaccine mandates during COVID. ... However, the horrors of the Holocaust are without precedent, and no one should make any modern-day comparisons that minimize the experience of the Holocaust and suffering under Hitler, nor the sacrifice of our veterans."

During her campaign for the UCP leadership, Smith conducted an interview with a naturopathic physician, discussing lifestyle for the prevention of cancer and how Smith's health savings account proposal could help with that. She said "When you think about everything that built up before you got to stage 4 [of cancer] and that diagnosis—that's completely within your control and there's something you can do about that that is different." NDP leader Rachel Notley and Smith's fellow candidates including Brian Jean criticized this comment, with Jean (who lost a son to cancer) saying "You [Smith] saying to someone that their cancer is 'completely within your control' before stage four is insensitive, hurtful, and outright untrue. Please stop."

=== Gender & LGBT issues ===
During the 2012 election, Smith said that she was pro-choice and supported same-sex marriage. While she was a columnist with the Calgary Herald, she argued in favour of legalizing sex work.

During her UCP leadership campaign in 2022, Smith proposed checking transgender athletes' testosterone levels before competing against cisgender women and a separate category for women with high testosterone levels.In February 2024, Smith announced a ban of gender-affirming healthcare for those 17 and under (including a ban on puberty blockers for those 15 and under), the requirement of parental consent for students aged 15 and under to be referred to by a different name or different gender pronouns, the requirement of parents to give their consent before having their children taught human sexuality, and that third-party resources on sexuality be approved by the Education Ministry. Smith announced a ban of trans women competing in women's sports in Alberta. The ban would not include a ban on women's shelters, women's prisons or women's changing rooms.

=== Immigration ===
In 2023, a new "Alberta is Calling" campaign was launched by Smith's government, ostensibly to bring skilled workers to Alberta by spending $10 million on advertisements in British Columbia, Ontario and Quebec. A $5000 relocation bonus was offered to eligible participants.

In March 2024, Smith advocated for the federal government to double the number of allotments to Alberta under the Provincial Nominee Program form 9,750 to 20,000 spots. In April 2024, Smith said she wanted to see the city of Red Deer grow from a population of around 100,000 to 1 million "in a few years' time."

In August 2024, Smith said she wanted to double Alberta's population to 10 million in order to gain "more political power." After criticism from conservatives, her government issued a statement "walking back" Smith's intentions citing how population growth would further impact housing and infrastructure.

In 2026, when Bruce McAllister, the executive director for the Alberta Premier's office expressed disgust on social media with Canada's immigration policies saying that governments decided to imported immigrants from "failed systems". Smith defended him.

=== Balance of power ===
On May 17, 2023, an investigation by Alberta Ethics Commissioner Marguerite Trussler found that Smith had violated section 3 of the Conflicts of Interest Act by talking to the Alberta Minister of Justice and Attorney-General of Alberta about charges in an ongoing criminal case against Christian street preacher and COVID-19 protestor Artur Pawlowski. Jim Foster, who was an attorney general under Peter Lougheed, condemned Smith for her violation and suggested a criminal probe.

In May, following the 2025 Canadian federal election, the Smith government introduced a bill which revised the Citizen Initiative Act by lowering the requirements to citizen-led referendum. She later announced that her government would honour a referendum on Alberta's separation from Canada if enough signatures where gathered. The bill was revised in December so that Elections Alberta or the courts could not question the constitutional validity of the referendum. Judge Colin Feasby, who was reviewing the constitutionality of a proposed referendum question before the new bill, criticized the new bill as undemocratic. Former Progressive Conservative justice ministers Ken Rostad and Verlyn Olson with 30 other lawyers wrote a letter saying these changes as well as “unacceptable” attacks on Alberta justice system and were aligning her government with authoritarianism. Country music singer Corb Lund, whose formerly approved petition initiative against coal mining in Alberta's Rockies was cancelled by the new bill, was also critical of the changes.

=== On the Russia-Ukraine war ===
After she became premier, it was revealed that she made comments on April 29 during a Locals.com livestream about Russia's invasion of Ukraine. Smith argued for a peace plan between Russia and Ukraine and advocated for Ukraine's neutrality. She also made subsequently deleted posts in March that questioned whether breakaway regions in Ukraine should be able to govern independently, and whether NATO played a role in the invasion, citing a conspiracy theory promoted by Tucker Carlson alleging 'secret U.S. funded biolabs' in Ukraine. On October 16, she said that she "stands with the Ukrainian people" and advocated for diplomacy to "spare millions of Ukrainian lives."

=== Ancestry claims and residential school gravesites ===
Her paternal great-grandfather was Philipus Kolodnicki, whose name was anglicized to "Philip Smith" upon arriving in Canada. In October 2022, she claimed Kolodnicki left Ukraine after World War I, which ended in 1918, to escape communism. She said her political beliefs were "largely born out of a complete distrust of the socialism from which my great-grandfather fled." In a 2012 profile in The Globe and Mail, Smith claimed Kolodnicki was a Ukrainian immigrant who arrived in Canada in 1915.

Immigration records reviewed by the Toronto Star showed Kolodnicki arrived in Canada in 1913, before either the First World War or the 1917 October Revolution. Kolodnicki also listed his nation of origin as Austria and his race as Ruthenian, a term that at the time referred to the ancestors of modern Ukrainians, Belarusians and Rusyns.

Beginning in 2012, Smith publicly claimed she had Cherokee roots through her great-great-grandmother, Mary Frances Crowe. Smith also claimed Crowe was a victim of the Trail of Tears and forcibly relocated to Kansas in the 1830s. An investigation by APTN National News found Crowe was born in 1870 in Georgia, about 20 years after the U.S. government forced the Cherokee out of their homelands. Kathy Griffin, a Cherokee genealogist in Texas who worked with APTN, could not find proof that any of Smith's ancestors were members of the historical Cherokee tribes, including the Eastern Band of Cherokee Indians, the United Keetoowah Band of Cherokee Indians of Oklahoma, or the Cherokee Nation. Smith's ancestors also did not appear on the Dawes Roll, a U.S. registry cataloguing members of the Cherokee, Creek, Choctaw, Chickasaw and Seminole. Following concerns that Smith claimed she had Cherokee roots, her press secretary said Smith had not done a "deep dive into her ancestry" and "heard about her heritage from her loved ones". Smith also made posts that questioned the legitimacy of reports that unmarked graves had been found at residential schools. In August 2025, Smith was subject to another controversy when she was seen wearing a traditional First Nations ribbon skirt, receiving criticism from some in the Indigenous community due to the sacred nature of ribbon skirts.

=== Conspiracy theories ===
At the 28 September 2024, UCP Town Hall in Edmonton, Smith responded to a concern that the municipality was being sprayed by so-called chemtrails—a "long-held conspiracy theory" that airplane condensation vapours are purposeful nefarious acts. Smith said, "Another person told me, if anyone is doing it, it's the U.S. Department of Defense." While Smith said she had inquired about airspace regulations over the weekend, Nav Canada said they had received no queries from the provincial government. According to an Associated Press article, a spokesman for the North American Aerospace Defence Command (NORAD) said there are no NORAD flights involving the spraying of chemicals in Canada. Timothy Caulfield said that in this "age of misinformation", when a political leader does not identify a conspiracy theory as such and correctly answering that it is not true, it is "horrifying". He added that Smith's comments contribute to the "normalization of conspiracy theories" such as "lizard aliens and a flat earth".

== Electoral history ==
=== 2023 general election ===
2023 Alberta general election: Brooks-Medicine Hat
Party	Candidate	Votes	%	±%
United Conservative	Danielle Smith	13,315	66.49	+11.98
New Democratic	Gwendoline Dirk	5,477	27.35	+0.61
Alberta Party	Barry Morishita	1,233	6.16	-10.37
Total		20,025	99.54	–
Rejected and declined		92	0.46	
Turnout		20,117	56.85	
Eligible voters		35,385		
United Conservative hold		Swing		-1.82
Source(s) Source: Elections Alberta

=== 2022 by-election ===
Alberta provincial by-election, 8 November 2022: Brooks-Medicine Hat
Party	Candidate	Votes	%	±%
United Conservative	Danielle Smith	6,919	54.51	-6.15
New Democratic	Gwendoline Dirk	3,394	26.74	+8.85
Alberta Party	Barry Morishita	2,098	16.53	+9.60
Alberta Independence	Bob Blayone	225	1.77	+0.80
Wildrose Independence	Jeevan Mangat	56	0.44	
Total valid votes		12,692		
Total rejected ballots		45		
Turnout		12,695	35.51	-30.27
Eligible voters		35,872		
United Conservative hold		Swing		-7.48
Elections Alberta

=== 2022 United Conservative leadership election ===
2022 United Conservative Party leadership election
Candidate	Round 1		Round 2		Round 3		Round 4		Round 5		Round 6	
Candidate	Votes	%	Votes	%	Votes	%	Votes	%	Votes	%	Votes	%
Danielle Smith	34,549	41.3	34,981	41.4	35,095	41.7	38,496	46.2	39,270	47.7	42,423	53.77
Travis Toews	24,831	29.4	25,054	29.7	25,593	30.4	26,592	31.9	30,794	37.4	36,480	46.23
Brian Jean	9,301	11.1	9,504	11.3	10,157	12.1	11,251	13.5	12,203	14.8	Eliminated	
Rebecca Schulz	5,835	6.9	6,108	7.3	6,784	8.0	6,972	8.4	Eliminated			
Todd Loewen	6,496	7.7	6,512	7.7	6,596	7.8	Eliminated					
Rajan Sawhney	1,787	2.1	2,246	2.7	Eliminated							
Leela Aheer	1,394	1.6	Eliminated									
Total	84,193	100.00	84,405	100.00	84,225	100.00	83,3177	100.00	82,267	100.00	78,903	100.00

=== 2012 general election ===
2012 Alberta general election: Highwood
Party	Candidate	Votes	%	±%
Wildrose Alliance	Danielle Smith	10,094	52.59%	40.74%
Progressive Conservative	John Barlow	8,159	42.51%	−22.60%
Liberal	Keegan Gibson	547	2.85%	−11.05%
New Democratic	Miles Dato	392	2.04%	−1.26%
Total		19,192	–	–
Rejected, spoiled and declined		50	33	10
Eligible electors / turnout		32,659	58.95%	17.86%
Wildrose Alliance gain from Progressive Conservative		Swing		−20.56%
Source(s) Source: "63 - Highwood, 2012 Alberta general election". officialresults.elections.ab.ca. Elections Alberta. Chief Electoral Officer (2012). The Report of the Chief Electoral Officer on the 2011 Provincial Enumeration and Monday, April 23, 2012 Provincial General Election of the Twenty-eighth Legislative Assembly (PDF) (Report). Edmonton, Alta.: Elections Alberta. pp. 378–382. Archived (PDF) from the original on May 6, 2021.

=== 2009 Wildrose leadership election ===
2009 Wildrose Alliance Party leadership election
Candidate	Votes	%
Danielle Smith	6,295	76.77
Mark Dyrholm	1,905	23.23
Total	8,200	100
