= Utah Constitutional Sovereignty Act =

Utah law

The Utah Constitutional Sovereignty Act is a law in the State of Utah that gives Utah the autonomy to reject US federal laws. It was signed by Governor Cox on 31 January 2024.

== Background ==
=== Tenth Amendment to the USA constitution ===
The Tenth Amendment of the Constitution of the United States of America defines the balance of power between states and the Federal Government. The law claims it has been misinterpreted and states have the right to reject any federal laws, unless the federal authority was explicitly stated in the Tenth Amendment.

=== Alberta sovereignty act ===
In the Canadian province of Alberta, the Alberta Sovereignty Within a United Canada Act was passed with an intention of having the right to reject Canadian federal laws if they negatively impact the province. Scott Sandall says he modeled the Utah Sovereignty Act off the Alberta act.

=== Signing ===
Proposed on 4 January 2024, it was signed by Governor Spencer Cox on 31 January 2024.
