= Barry Morishita =

Canadian politician

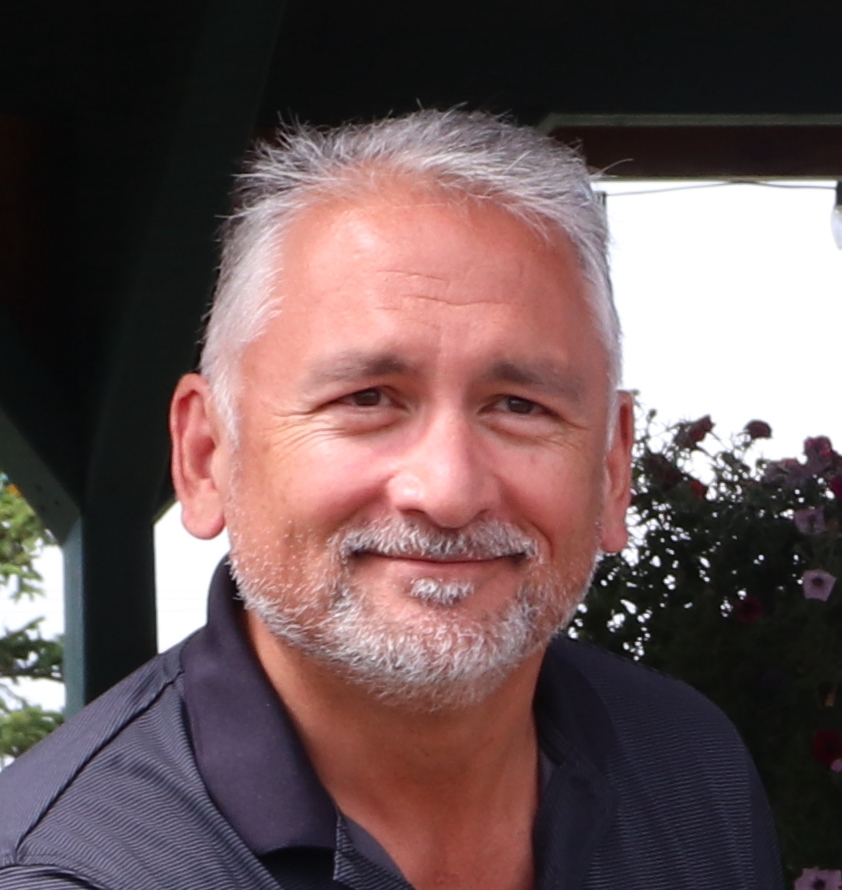

Leader of the Alberta Party
- In office September 1, 2021 – October 15, 2023
- Preceded by: Jacquie Fenske (interim)
- Succeeded by: Lindsay Amantea (interim)

Mayor of Brooks
- In office 2016–2021
- Preceded by: Martin Shields
- Succeeded by: John Petrie

President of the Alberta Urban Municipalities Association
- In office 2017–2021
- Succeeded by: Angela Duncan (interim)

Brooks City Councilor
- In office 1998–2003
- In office 2010–2015

Personal details
- Born: 1966 (age 59–60) Brooks, Alberta, Canada
- Party: Alberta Party
- Other political affiliations: Alberta Liberal Party (2001)
- Spouse: Jeanne Morishita (m. 1986)
- Children: 2
- Education: Rosemary High School

Barry Morishita is a Canadian politician who served as the leader of the Alberta Party from 2021 to 2023. He previously served on the city council of Brooks in 1998 and became the city's mayor in 2016.

== Background ==
Morishita's father, Douglas, was born in 1945 while his family was interred at the Tashme Incarceration Camp, during World War II. He moved to Brooks at the end of the war, where Morishita was born.

He graduated Rosemary High School in 1983.

In 1986, he married his wife, Jeanne.

Before his entry into politics he owned and operated an auto part store along with some business partners.

== Political career ==
Morishita was first elected in Brooks city council in 1998 at the age of 32. He was elected Mayor of Brooks in 2016 and president of the Alberta Urban Municipalities Association in 2017. In September 2021, he stepped down from both roles to become leader of the Alberta Party after the resignation of former party leader Stephen Mandel. He ran in a by-election for the southern Alberta seat of Brooks-Medicine Hat on November 8, 2022 but lost to the UCP candidate, Alberta premier Danielle Smith.

On October 15, 2023, Morishita resigned as leader of the Alberta Party.

== Electoral record ==
=== 2023 general election ===
2023 Alberta general election: Brooks-Medicine Hat
Party	Candidate	Votes	%	±%
United Conservative	Danielle Smith	13,315	66.49	+11.98
New Democratic	Gwendoline Dirk	5,477	27.35	+0.61
Alberta Party	Barry Morishita	1,233	6.16	-10.37
Total		20,025	99.54	–
Rejected and declined		92	0.46	
Turnout		20,117	56.85	
Eligible voters		35,385		
United Conservative hold		Swing		-1.82
Source(s) Source: Elections Alberta

=== 2022 by-election ===
Alberta provincial by-election, 8 November 2022: Brooks-Medicine Hat
Party	Candidate	Votes	%	±%
United Conservative	Danielle Smith	6,919	54.51	-6.15
New Democratic	Gwendoline Dirk	3,394	26.74	+8.85
Alberta Party	Barry Morishita	2,098	16.53	+9.60
Alberta Independence	Bob Blayone	225	1.77	+0.80
Wildrose Independence	Jeevan Mangat	56	0.44	
Total valid votes		12,692		
Total rejected ballots		45		
Turnout		12,695	35.51	-30.27
Eligible voters		35,872		
United Conservative hold		Swing		-7.48
Elections Alberta

=== 2001 general election ===
2001 Alberta general election: Strathmore-Brooks
Party	Candidate	Votes	%	±%
Progressive Conservative	Lyle Oberg	8,585	75.09%	2.51%
Liberal	Barry Morishita	1,774	15.52%	2.76%
Independent	Christopher Sutherland	511	4.47%	–
New Democratic	Don MacFarlane	290	2.54%	-3.48%
Social Credit	Rudy Martens	273	2.39%	-6.26%
Total		11,433	–	–
Rejected, spoiled and declined		29	–	–
Eligible electors / turnout		24,372	47.03%	0.05%
Progressive Conservative hold		Swing		-0.12%
Source(s) Source: "Strathmore-Brooks Official Results 2001 Alberta general election". Alberta Heritage Community Foundation.
