= Craig Chandler =

Canadian businessman, lobbyist and political activist

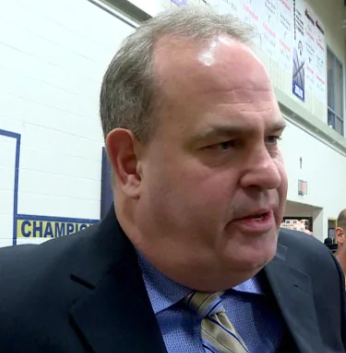
- Craig Chandler in 2019
- Born: June 6, 1970 (age 56); Ontario, Canada
- Education: McMaster University
- Occupation: Political organizer
- Website: https://www.electcraigchandler.ca/

Craig B. Chandler is a Canadian businessman, lobbyist, and political activist. He is co-founder and CEO of the Progressive Group for Independent Business (PGIB). He is a political organizer for various right-wing groups in Albertan politics. He has run for political office multiple times, but has never been elected.

== Political career ==
=== Early political experience ===
As an undergraduate at McMaster University in Hamilton, Ontario in the late 1980s, Chandler joined the Reform Party of Canada, where he was active as an organizer and fund-raiser. In the 1993 federal election, Chandler ran as a Reform Party candidate in the riding of Hamilton Mountain, losing to Liberal incumbent Beth Phinney.

Chandler moved to Alberta in 1995. He ran in the 1997 provincial election as a candidate for the Social Credit Party of Alberta in the riding of Calgary West, finishing with 1,100 votes, or 7.5% of the electorate.

In 2000, Chandler's Progressive Group for Independent Business (PGIB) supported the creation of the Canadian Alliance. In 2002, Chandler and the PGIB backed Stephen Harper's successful bid for the leadership of the Alliance.

=== Federal politics ===
In 2003, Chandler joined the Progressive Conservative Party and became a candidate for the party's leadership, running on a platform of creating a coalition between the PC and Alliance party caucuses. He withdrew prior to voting and endorsed Calgary lawyer Jim Prentice, who also supported cooperation between the parties.

At the end of his speech Chandler was complimentary of the leadership qualities of his competitors David Orchard and Scott Brison, before endorsing and pledging support to Calgary lawyer Jim Prentice's leadership bid to the astonishment of many delegates in attendance.

Chandler admitted in The Globe and Mail and the National Post (May 29, 2003) that he had never tried to seriously contest the leadership of the PC Party, but had instead served as a voice for the Progressive Group for Independent Business (PGIB) and their United Alternative efforts. PGIB donated $250,000 to Chandler's bid.

=== Alberta provincial politics ===
Craig Chandler is the founder of Concerned Christians Canada (CCC), a Christian-right lobbying organization. The organization was used to promote or demote candidates in local Albertan elections. The organization has been subject to controversies and is seen as homophobic, after executive director Stephen Boissoin wrote an article in 2002 in the Red Deer Advocate suggesting that gay people are as immoral as drug dealers and pedophiles.

In the fall of 2007, Chandler sought the Progressive Conservative Association of Alberta (PCAA) nomination of Calgary-Egmont for the up-coming Alberta provincial election. Premier Ed Stelmach rejected Chandler as a candidate and barred him from running for the party due to Chandler's remarks on homosexuality. The Alberta Human Rights Commission ruled that a letter written by CCC executive director and endorsed by Chandler, broke provincial human rights laws, and Chandler was ordered to apologize on his website. However, the ruling was overturned in 2009 on the grounds of free speech.

In the 2008 Alberta election held on March 3, Chandler ran as an independent candidate in the Calgary-Egmont riding against Jonathan Denis, his replacement as the Tory candidate, and Liberal Cathie Williams. Chandler was widely expected to run as a candidate for the new Wildrose Alliance Party of Alberta but was defeated in his attempt to win election to the new party's board of directors. In the provincial election Chandler finished in third place with 2008 votes (16.2%), well behind Cathie Williams, the Liberal Party candidate, with 3289 votes (26.5%). The Progressive Conservative candidate (Jonathan Denis) won with 43.6% of the vote (5415 votes)."

In 2016 Chandler was acclaimed as a regional director for the PCAA in Calgary. He unsuccessfully campaigned for the PCAA for the Calgary-Shaw riding. He later resigned after claiming that restaurant-chain Earls supports terrorism.

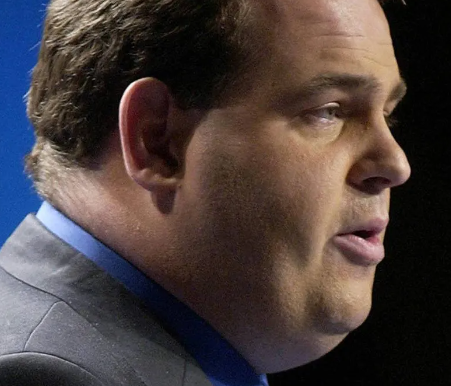
Craig Chandler at a public meeting in 2003.

=== Campaign management ===
Chandler claims to have managed 48 campaigns, presumably nominations, leadership races, municipal, provincial and federal elections. He has never won any elections himself.

In November 2004 during the 2004 Alberta election, Craig Chandler managed the campaign of David Crutcher, an Alberta Alliance Party candidate in Calgary-Egmont. Crutcher was not elected, winning 1,657 votes, or 14% of the total. Notably, David Crutcher received more votes than any other Alliance candidate in an urban riding. In 2005, David Crutcher ran for the leadership of the Alberta Alliance and Chandler managed his leadership campaign. Crutcher placed third out of four candidates. Chandler also managed the successful campaign of MLA Art Johnston.

He was also the campaign manager for Calgary Ward 14 winning alderman Peter Demong, and briefly served as his constituency assistant. Chandler also managed the third-place race of Jon Lord for the Conservative Party nomination in Calgary Centre and produced victories for Councilor Shane Keating, Peter Demong and Joe Magliocca in the 2013 Calgary civic election.

In 2020, Chandler worked on Dr. Leslyn Lewis' campaign for leader of the Conservative Party of Canada in which she was defeated. According to Chandler's website he claimed to be the Western Chair for her campaign. However, Steve Outhouse, the National Campaign Manager of Lewis's campaign denied that Chandler was Western Chair. According to the Western Standard, Outhouse stated "he [Chandler] only ran the call centre for Alberta and Saskatchewan and set up a couple meet and greets for her. And that was it."

In 2021, Chandler spearheaded the Take Back City Hall initiative to elect more small-c conservatives at the municipal level in Calgary, Alberta. The initiative recruited candidates and managed their campaigns in a few wards in Calgary with the Progressive Group for Independent Business (PGIB) as a vehicle. Almost all of the races ended in a loss for the Chandler backed candidates with Chandler, who ran himself in Ward 12, soundly defeated. Only a single candidate Dan McLean in Ward 13 achieved victory.

In 2022 Chandler again was employed by Dr. Leslyn Lewis to work on her second leadership campaign to be the leader of the Conservative Party of Canada. However, in this second effort the results were lower than the first attempt where she garnered less than 10% of the vote losing to Pierre Poilievre on the first ballot.

In 2024, Craig Chandler represented former Chestermere mayor Jeff Colvin in his re-election campaign. Colvin was removed from the position of mayor by the Albertan government the previous year after a municipal inspection found the city to be mismanaged. The city of Chestermere then attempted to sue Colvin to recover unauthorized expenditures. During a city council meeting in which a lawyer representing Chestermere discussed legal action against Colvin to recover the misspent funds, Craig Chandler made several outbursts in which he threatened legal action against the city for what he claimed to be election interference. He eventually left the city hall building with RCMP.

In 2025, Chandler organized the Calgary municipal election campaign for A Better Calgary Party. They received 8.59% of the overall vote and won 1 council seat.

== Political rhetoric ==
=== Remarks to new immigrants ===
In 2007 Chandler was on record stating that immigrants had to vote for conservative parties, or they had to leave Alberta. There was pushback from the PCAA that Chandler was dictating how people were to vote in an election and that only those votes that agreed with Chandler's views were acceptable.

=== Endorsement of homophobic letter ===
In 2007, Chandler was barred from running for the Progressive Conservative Party of Alberta due to an anti-gay letter that was written by an executive director of the Concerned Christians Canada organization that Chandler founded.

In 2012, Chandler expressed support for Wildrose Party candidate Allan Hunsperger after he was called to be removed as a candidate due to homophobic remarks. Chandler iterated that he believed homosexuality is a sin, and that "although the wording Mr. Hunsperger chose could have been more Christ-like what he has said is biblically accurate". These comments brought controversy again in 2016 when Chandler was acclaimed regional director of the PCAA in Calgary.

=== Ann Coulter Speaking Tour ===
In 2010 Ezra Levant, CEO of Rebel News, organized a cross country speaking tour at various universities by American right wing pundit Ann Coulter. Chandler attempted to pose as one of the organizers and as a result was banned from the events. According to Levant "Chandler was not allowed to attend the reception because he misrepresented himself as an organizer in media interviews during the incident in Ottawa." Coulter herself spoke on the matter about Chandler's misrepresentation saying “I was watching the local news, which was all hockey and Ann Coulter, and some nut came on claiming that he was the organizer behind my speech... I sent an e-mail to my bodyguard saying Craig Chandler is disinvited from the event in Calgary. He’s on TV claiming to be the organizer and denouncing me!”

=== Claims of terrorist funding ===
In 2016, Chandler claimed that the restaurant chains Earls supports terrorists by purchasing meat from a US supplier that offer halal products. Following the backlash to this, Chandler resigned in from the PC Party of Alberta's board of directors. Chandler apologized for his comments in 2016, but in 2018 stated that he never apologized and never will.

=== Disputed videos ===
In 2022, Chandler was featured in an online video deemed racist along with former Alberta Cabinet Minister Jonathan Denis. The video clips showed him using offensive stereotypes of first nations. In an interview Chandler stated he was pictured in one of the videos and that "Some comedy is not politically correct, but this is a private function of my close friends. The video was taken by a close friend, I thought," he said. Chandler was working on Danielle Smith's leadership campaign when the videos came out and she fired Chandler over it.

Later Chandler changed his story claiming the videos were fake. However, Hany Farid, an expert in the area of deep fakes states "I think it's extremely unlikely that these are deepfakes."

=== Threatening to sue Steve Outhouse ===
On March 22 Chandler posted to his two Facebook pages, LinkedIn account and Twitter account his dissatisfaction with UCP Campaign Chair Steve Outhouse. He later took down three of the posts but left his Twitter post in place. Chandler professed dissatisfaction with Outhouse being named campaign chair while being from Ontario among other complaints.
