= Michaela Frey =

Canadian politician

Member of the Legislative Assembly of Alberta for Brooks-Medicine Hat
- In office April 16, 2019 – October 7, 2022
- Preceded by: Riding Established
- Succeeded by: Danielle Smith

Personal details
- Born: 1992 or 1993 (age 32–33)
- Party: United Conservative Party

Michaela Frey, née Glasgo (born 1992/1993) is a Canadian politician elected in the 2019 Alberta general election to represent the electoral district of Brooks-Medicine Hat in the 30th Alberta Legislature. She was a member of the United Conservative Party (UCP) caucus.

In January 2019, Frey claimed on Twitter that her church would incur a $50,000 yearly bill due to Alberta's carbon tax; this was quickly disputed and found to be untrue. The pastor of the church later said that the true cost to the church would be $5,433 a year. In June 2020 she was appointed to be Chairman of the Alberta Firearms Advisory Committee by Premier Jason Kenney. In this role she was in charge of advising the Executive Council of Alberta on its firearms policies.

In 2022, she resigned her seat to allow the newly elected leader of the UCP and premier, Danielle Smith, to seek a seat in the legislature.
