= Brooks-Medicine Hat =

Provincial electoral district in Alberta, Canada

Alberta electoral district
- Brooks-Medicine Hat within Alberta (2017 boundaries).

Provincial electoral district
- Legislature: Legislative Assembly of Alberta
MLA
Danielle Smith
United Conservative
- District created: 2017
- First contested: 2019
- Last contested: 2023

Demographics
- Population (2016): 51,070
- Area (km²): 13,742
- Pop. density (per km²): 3.7
- Census division(s): 1, 2
- Census subdivision(s): Bassano, Brooks, Cypress County, Duchess, Medicine Hat, Newell County, Redcliff, Rosemary

Brooks-Medicine Hat is a provincial electoral district in Alberta, Canada. The district is one of 87 districts mandated to return a single member (MLA) to the Legislative Assembly of Alberta using the first past the post method of voting. It was contested for the first time in the 2019 Alberta election and is presently represented by Premier Danielle Smith.

== Geography ==
The district is located in southeastern Alberta, containing the entirety of Newell County and the northern portions of Cypress County and Medicine Hat. It is named for its two largest communities, Medicine Hat and Brooks, and also contains CFB Suffield. Within the city of Medicine Hat, its border with Cypress-Medicine Hat runs southeast along Highway 1, then northeast along Highway 41A until the railroad tracks, then east along the South Saskatchewan River.

== History ==
Brooks-Medicine Hat
Assembly	Years	Member	Party
Riding created from Cypress-Medicine Hat, Medicine Hat and Strathmore-Brooks
30th	2019–2022	Michaela Frey	United Conservative
30th	2022–2023	Danielle Smith	United Conservative
31st	2023–Present	Danielle Smith	United Conservative

The district was created in 2017 when the Electoral Boundaries Commission endeavoured to reduce the number of ridings in southern Alberta, owing to slow population growth in the region. The district was created from the eastern half of Strathmore-Brooks, the northern third of Cypress-Medicine Hat, and some of the northern neighbourhoods previously part of Medicine Hat. Based on Statistics Canada information, in 2017, the Brooks-Medicine Hat electoral district had a population of 51,070, which was 9 per cent above the provincial average of 46,803 for a provincial electoral district.

In the 2019 Alberta general election, United Conservative Party (UCP) candidate Michaela Frey (Note: elected as Michaela Glasgo) was elected with 61 per cent of the vote, defeating New Democratic Party candidate Lynn MacWilliam with 18 per cent of the vote and four other candidates. Independent candidate Todd Beasley was previously removed from the UCP constituency nomination contest by the party after making comments on social media describing Islam as an "evil cult". On October 7, 2022, Frey resigned her seat in the Legislative Assembly to allow the newly elected leader of the United Conservative Party and premier, Danielle Smith, to seek a seat in legislature. Smith was elected on November 8, 2022.

== Electoral results ==
=== 2023 ===
2023 Alberta general election
Party	Candidate	Votes	%	±%
United Conservative	Danielle Smith	13,315	66.49	+11.98
New Democratic	Gwendoline Dirk	5,477	27.35	+0.61
Alberta Party	Barry Morishita	1,233	6.16	-10.37
Total		20,025	99.54	–
Rejected and declined		92	0.46	
Turnout		20,117	56.85	
Eligible voters		35,385		
United Conservative hold		Swing		-1.82
Source(s) Source: Elections Alberta

=== 2022 by-election ===
Alberta provincial by-election, 8 November 2022
Party	Candidate	Votes	%	±%
United Conservative	Danielle Smith	6,919	54.51	-6.15
New Democratic	Gwendoline Dirk	3,394	26.74	+8.85
Alberta Party	Barry Morishita	2,098	16.53	+9.60
Alberta Independence	Bob Blayone	225	1.77	+0.80
Wildrose Independence	Jeevan Mangat	56	0.44	–
Total valid votes		12,692		
Total rejected ballots		45		
Turnout		12,695	35.51	-30.27
Eligible voters		35,872		
United Conservative hold		Swing		-7.48
Source(s) Source:Elections Alberta

=== 2019 ===
2019 Alberta general election
Party	Candidate	Votes	%	±%	Expenditures
United Conservative	Michaela Glasgo	13,606	60.66	-11.42	$57,924
New Democratic	Lynn MacWilliam	4,012	17.89	-5.33	$16,573
Independent	Todd Beasley	2,759	12.30	–	$36,347
Alberta Party	Jim Black	1,554	6.93	+4.30	$10,750
Liberal	Jamah Bashir Farah	281	1.25	+0.05	$500
Alberta Independence	Collin Pacholek	218	0.97	–	$1,751
Total		22,430	99.53	–	
Rejected, spoiled and declined		105	0.47		
Turnout		22,535	65.78	–	
Eligible electors		34,257			
United Conservative notional hold		Swing		-3.05	
Source(s) Source: Elections Alberta Note: Expenses is the sum of "Election Expenses", "Other Expenses" and "Transfers Issued". The Elections Act limits "Election Expenses" to $50,000. United Conservative Party change is calculated from combined Wildrose and Progressive Conservative totals.

=== 2015 ===
Redistributed results, 2015 Alberta election
Wildrose	8,886	48.40
Progressive Conservative	4,348	23.68
New Democratic	4,263	23.22
Alberta Party	482	2.63
Liberal	220	1.20
Green	82	0.45
Others	78	0.42

== See also ==
- List of Alberta provincial electoral districts
- Canadian provincial electoral districts

== Notes ==
Legislative Assembly of Alberta
Preceded by Calgary-Lougheed	Constituency represented by the premier of Alberta; 2022-present	Incumbent
