= 2022 Brooks-Medicine Hat provincial by-election =

Federal by-election in Alberta, Canada

2022 Brooks-Medicine Hat by-election
- November 8, 2022

Riding of Brooks-Medicine Hat
- Turnout: 35.51% (▼30.27)
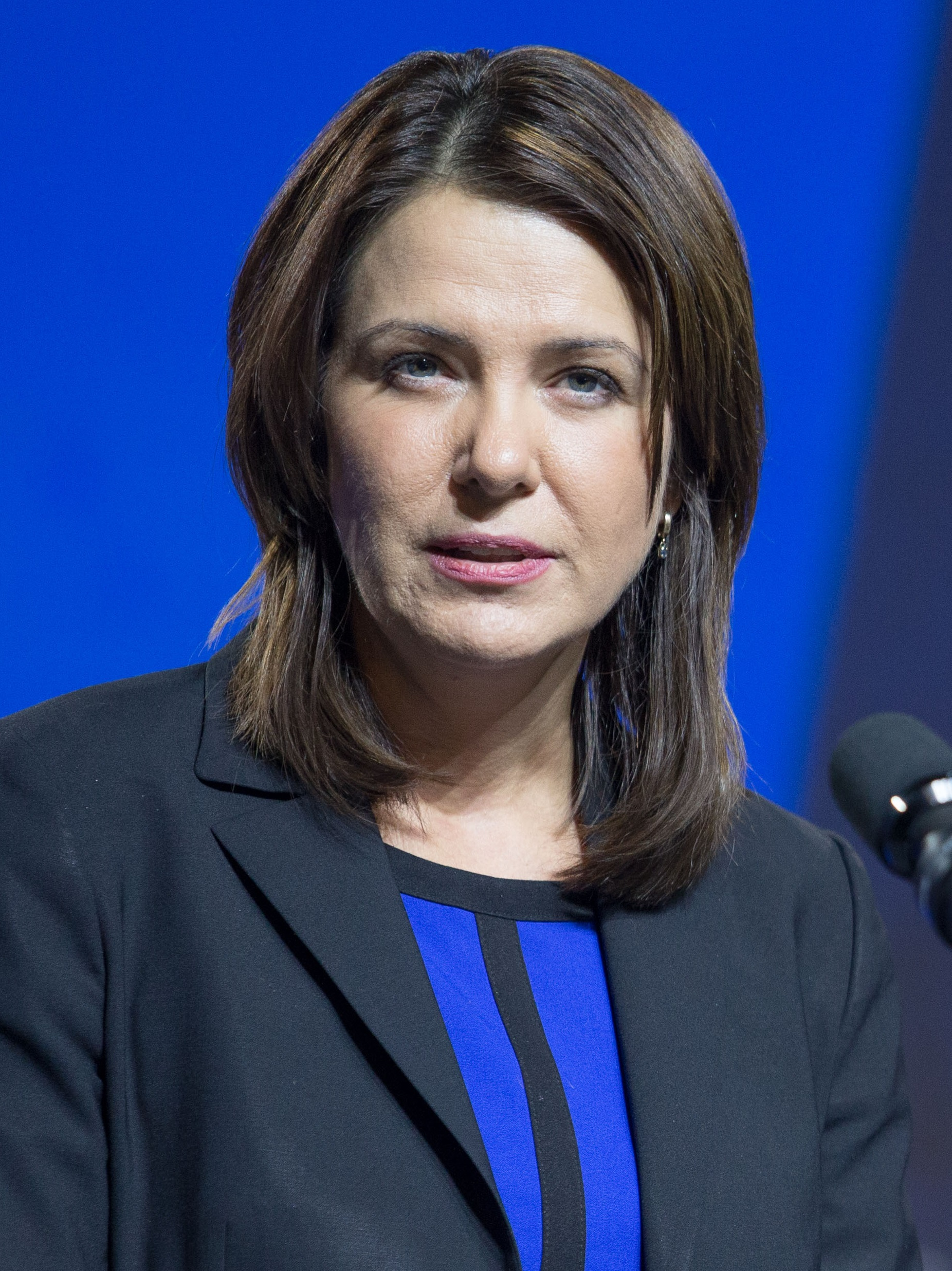

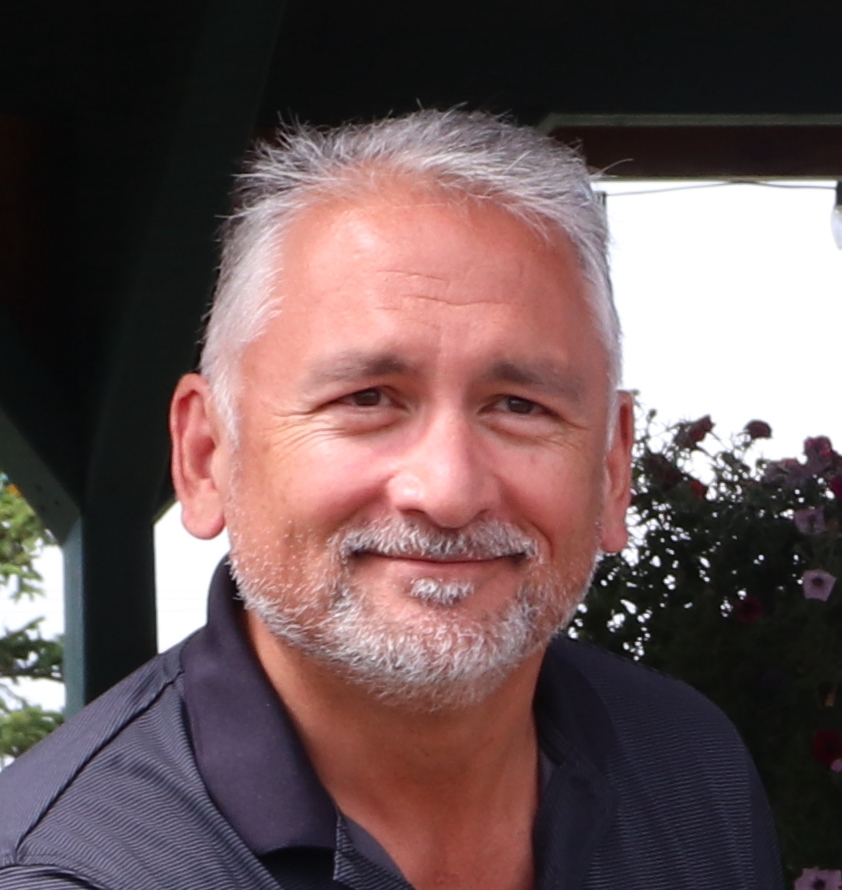
	First party	Second party	Third party
		NDP
Candidate	Danielle Smith	Gwendoline Dirk	Barry Morishita
Party	United Conservative	New Democratic	Alberta Party
Popular vote	6,919	3,394	2,098
Percentage	54.51%	26.74	16.53%
Swing	▼6.15 pp	▲8.85 pp	▲9.60 pp
MLA before election
Michaela Frey
United Conservative
Elected MLA
Danielle Smith
United Conservative

A by-election was held in the provincial riding of Brooks-Medicine Hat in Alberta, Canada, on November 8, 2022, following the resignation of incumbent United Conservative MLA Michaela Frey.

== Context ==
On October 6, 2022, former Wildrose Party leader Danielle Smith was elected leader of the United Conservative Party, defeating all other candidates including former Minister of Finance Travis Toews after six ballot counts. The election was triggered by the resignation of Jason Kenney following a leadership review. A week after her election, Smith was sworn in as the 19th Premier of Alberta. As Smith was not a member of the Legislative Assembly when she became premier, fellow UCP MLA Michaela Frey resigned her seat and had encouraged Smith to run in the by-election. Longstanding convention in Westminster systems when the leader of the governing party is not a member of the legislature to either hold a general election or a by-election, often caused by a sitting member in a safe seat resigning in order to allow the newly elected leader a chance to enter the legislature. Smith won the by-election, with 54.5% of the vote.

== Constituency ==
The district is located in southeastern Alberta, containing the entirety of Newell County and the northern portions of Cypress County and Medicine Hat. It is named for its two largest communities, Medicine Hat and Brooks, and also contains CFB Suffield. Within the city of Medicine Hat, its border with Cypress-Medicine Hat runs southeast along Highway 1, then northeast along Highway 41A until the railroad tracks, then east along the South Saskatchewan River.

== Candidates ==
The election was contested by 3 party leaders, Smith of the UCP, former Brooks mayor Barry Morishita of the Alberta Party, and Jeevan Mangat of the Wildrose Independence Party. Gwendolyn Dirk of the Alberta NDP would recontest the riding in the 2023 general election.

== Results ==
Alberta provincial by-election, 8 November 2022: Brooks-Medicine Hat
Party	Candidate	Votes	%	±%
United Conservative	Danielle Smith	6,919	54.51	-6.15
New Democratic	Gwendoline Dirk	3,394	26.74	+8.85
Alberta Party	Barry Morishita	2,098	16.53	+9.60
Alberta Independence	Bob Blayone	225	1.77	+0.80
Wildrose Independence	Jeevan Mangat	56	0.44	–
Total valid votes		12,692		
Total rejected ballots		45		
Turnout		12,695	35.51	-30.27
Eligible voters		35,872		
United Conservative hold		Swing		-7.48
Source(s) Source:Elections Alberta

== 2019 results ==
2019 Alberta general election: Brooks-Medicine Hat
Party	Candidate	Votes	%	±%	Expenditures
United Conservative	Michaela Glasgo	13,606	60.66	-11.42	$57,924
New Democratic	Lynn MacWilliam	4,012	17.89	-5.33	$16,573
Independent	Todd Beasley	2,759	12.30	–	$36,347
Alberta Party	Jim Black	1,554	6.93	+4.30	$10,750
Liberal	Jamah Bashir Farah	281	1.25	+0.05	$500
Alberta Independence	Collin Pacholek	218	0.97	–	$1,751
Total		22,430	99.53	–	
Rejected, spoiled and declined		105	0.47		
Turnout		22,535	65.78	–	
Eligible electors		34,257			
United Conservative notional hold		Swing		-3.05	
Source(s) Source: Elections Alberta Note: Expenses is the sum of "Election Expenses", "Other Expenses" and "Transfers Issued". The Elections Act limits "Election Expenses" to $50,000. United Conservative Party change is calculated from combined Wildrose and Progressive Conservative totals.
