= 2003 Progressive Conservative leadership election =

Canadian political party leadership race

2003 Progressive Conservative Party leadership election
- May 31, 2003

2,629 delegates in the 1st ballot 1,315 delegate votes needed to win
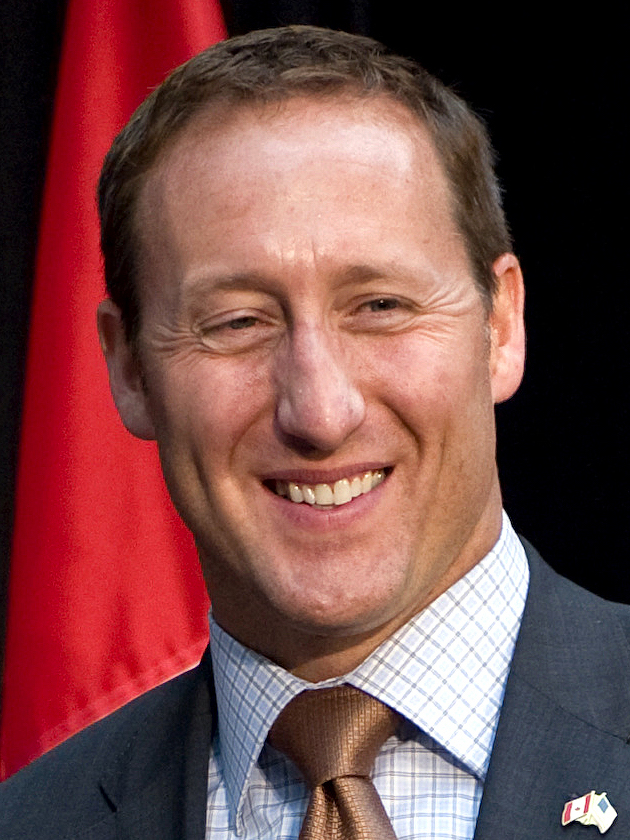

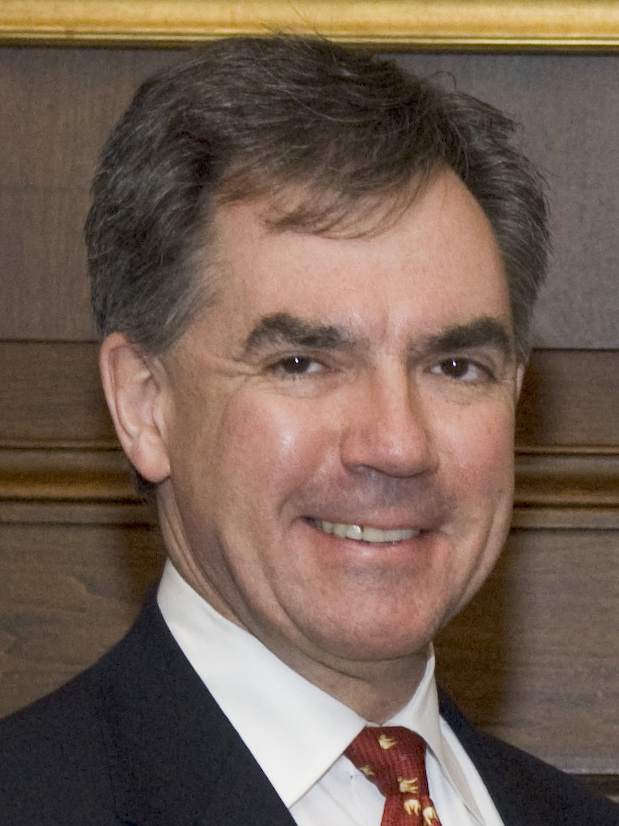

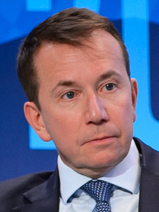
Candidate	Peter MacKay	Jim Prentice
Fourth ballot delegate count	1,538 (64.8%)	836 (35.2%)
Third ballot delegate count	1,128 (45.0%)	761 (30.4%)
Second ballot delegate count	1,018 (39.7%)	466 (18.2%)
First ballot delegate count	1,080 (41.1%)	478 (18.2%)
	PC
Candidate	David Orchard	Scott Brison
Fourth ballot delegate count	Eliminated	Eliminated
Third ballot delegate count	617 (24.6%)	Eliminated
Second ballot delegate count	619 (24.1%)	463 (18.0%)
First ballot delegate count	640 (24.3%)	431 (16.4%)
Leader before election
Joe Clark
Elected leader
Peter MacKay

2003 Progressive Conservative leadership election
- Date: May 31, 2003
- Convention: Metro Toronto Convention Centre, Toronto, Ontario
- Resigning leader: Joe Clark
- Won by: Peter MacKay
- Ballots: 4
- Candidates: 5
- Entrance fee: C$
- Spending limit: None

The 2003 Progressive Conservative leadership election was held on May 31, 2003, to elect a leader of the Progressive Conservative Party of Canada. Peter MacKay was elected as leader to replace former Prime Minister Joe Clark, who then retired as party leader. In the end, five candidates emerged as challengers for the leadership by the convention date. Two other candidates had participated in the race but both withdrew as contestants before the vote. Quebec Member of Parliament (MP) André Bachand withdrew his candidacy from the race due to financial concerns and backed Peter MacKay. Former Cabinet Minister and Quebec MP Heward Grafftey also withdrew his candidacy from the race due to health concerns and backed David Orchard.

The results of the race produced immediate controversy when it emerged that winner Mackay had signed an agreement with David Orchard in order to get elected. This deal promised the party would review the Canadian-American Free Trade Agreement, and that it would not cooperate or merge with the Canadian Alliance. This controversy continued when MacKay ignored the agreement, and signed an agreement to merge his party with the Canadian Alliance to form the new Conservative Party of Canada. The merger was approved by party members in December 2003. After the merger was approved, Brison announced that he was defecting to the Liberals.

== Candidates ==
- Peter MacKay, 37, Member of Parliament for Central Nova, Nova Scotia, former Crown Attorney.(
- Jim Prentice, 46, Calgary lawyer and past Progressive Conservative candidate for parliament.
- David Orchard, 52, Saskatchewan farmer and campaigner against globalization and free trade. Runner-up in 1998 leadership election.
- Scott Brison, 35, Member of Parliament for Kings—Hants, Nova Scotia.
- Craig Chandler, 32, executive director of Progressive Group for Independent Business and a social conservative activist in Alberta. Ran on a Unite the Right platform calling on the Progressive Conservatives to merge with the Canadian Alliance.

== Withdrawn ==
- André Bachand, 41, Member of Parliament for Richmond—Arthabaska, Quebec. Withdrew to support MacKay
- Heward Grafftey, 74, former MP for Brome—Missisquoi, Quebec (1958–1968, 1972–1980) and former Minister of State for Social Programs and Minister of State for Science and Technology (1979–1980).

== Results ==
Delegate support by ballot
Candidate	1st ballot		2nd ballot		3rd ballot		4th ballot	
Candidate	Votes cast	%	Votes cast	%	Votes cast	%	Votes cast	%
Peter MacKay	1,080	41.1%	1,018	39.7%	1,128	45.0%	1,538	64.8%
Jim Prentice	478	18.2%	466	18.2%	761	30.4%	836	35.2%
David Orchard	640	24.3%	619	24.1%	617	24.6%	Endorsed MacKay	
Scott Brison	431	16.4%	463	18.0%	Endorsed Prentice			
Craig Chandler	0	—	Withdrew before 1st ballot began; Endorsed Prentice					
Total	2,629	100.0%	2,566	100.0%	2,506	100.0%	2,374	100.0%

First round
MacKay	41.08%
Orchard	24.34%
Prentice	18.18%
Brison	16.39%
Chandler	0.00%

Second round
MacKay	39.70%
Prentice	24.10%
Orchard	18.20%
Brison	16.39%

Third round
MacKay	45.0%
Prentice	30.4%
Orchard	24.6%

Final round
MacKay	64.79%
Prentice	35.21%

Chandler withdrew before voting began to endorse Prentice. Estimates suggest that Chandler had six committed delegates from Calgary ridings who voted in favour of Prentice. After the second ballot, Brison dropped off and supported Prentice. Brison was the only candidate to gain votes on this ballot compared to his first ballot result; all of the other candidates lost votes. After the third ballot, Orchard threw his support to MacKay after the two men signed an agreement committing MacKay to not merge the PCs with the Canadian Alliance and to hold a review of the Canada-U.S. Free Trade Agreement.

== See also ==
- Progressive Conservative leadership conventions
- 2004 Conservative Party of Canada leadership election
