= Laura Jones (economist) =

Canadian economist and expert on the costs of regulation

- Education: M.A. in Economics Simon Fraser University
- Occupation: Economist
- Employer: Business Council of British Columbia

Laura Jones is a Canadian economist. Since 2023, she has been President and Chief Executive Officer of the Business Council of British Columbia. Before that, she was Executive Vice-President at the Canadian Federation of Independent Business.

Jones is recognized internationally for her research on regulatory modernization.

== Education and career ==
In May 2023, it was announced that Laura Jones would take up the position of President and Chief Executive Officer of the Business Council of British Columbia.

For 20 years before that, Jones was at the Canadian Federation of Independent Business (CFIB), lastly as Chief Strategic Officer and Executive Vice-President. While there, she was responsible for the CFIB's legislative, communications, research, and IT functions. She also spearheaded the CFIB's annual Red Tape Awareness Week.

Before joining the CFIB, Laura Jones was the Director of Environment and Regulatory Studies at the Fraser Institute. There she authored or co-authored several public policy studies, including Canada's Regulatory Burden: How Many Regulations? At What Cost? and A Different Kind of Environmentalist. She also co-ordinated the Fraser Institute's annual survey of mining companies.

Jones has served on the boards of the Macdonald-Laurier Institute and the Canadian Federation of Independent Business.

Laura Jones received a B.A. in Economics from Mount Holyoke College in Massachusetts, and an M.A. in Economics from Simon Fraser University. She has taught economics at Coquitlam College and the British Columbia Institute of Technology.

== Research on regulatory reform ==
Laura Jones has led "groundbreaking" research on the costs of regulation in Canada and in the United States. Her case study from British Columbia entitled Successful Practices and Policies to Promote Regulatory Reform and Entrepreneurship was written for the OECD. She prepared Cutting Red Tape in Canada: A Regulatory Reform Model for the United States? for the Mercatus Center at George Mason University. Jones' study (with P. McLaughlin) on measuring the burden of regulation was published in 2022 by the Harvard Journal of Law and Public Policy.

Jones has edited five books, including Safe Enough? Managing Risk and Regulation. She has written columns for some of Canada's largest newspapers, including the Vancouver Sun, the Ottawa Citizen, the National Post, and the Globe and Mail.

Laura Jones has testified on proposed legislation before parliamentary committees in Canada, and before congressional committees in the United States. She has served on several federal and provincial committees that advise governments on reducing the burden of regulation, including the Government of Canada's Red Tape Advisory Committee and its Paperwork Burden Reduction Initiative. In 2023, she was Chair of the federal government's External Advisory Committee for Regulatory Competitiveness, a committee established in 2018.

Recommendations originating with Laura Jones' work have led to policy changes, including the taxpayer fairness codes adopted by the governments of British Columbia and Canada; reductions in interprovincial trade barriers; and implementation of regulatory measurements across Canada.
