= Alberta Sovereignty Act =

2022 Canadian provincial legislation

Alberta Sovereignty Within a United Canada Act
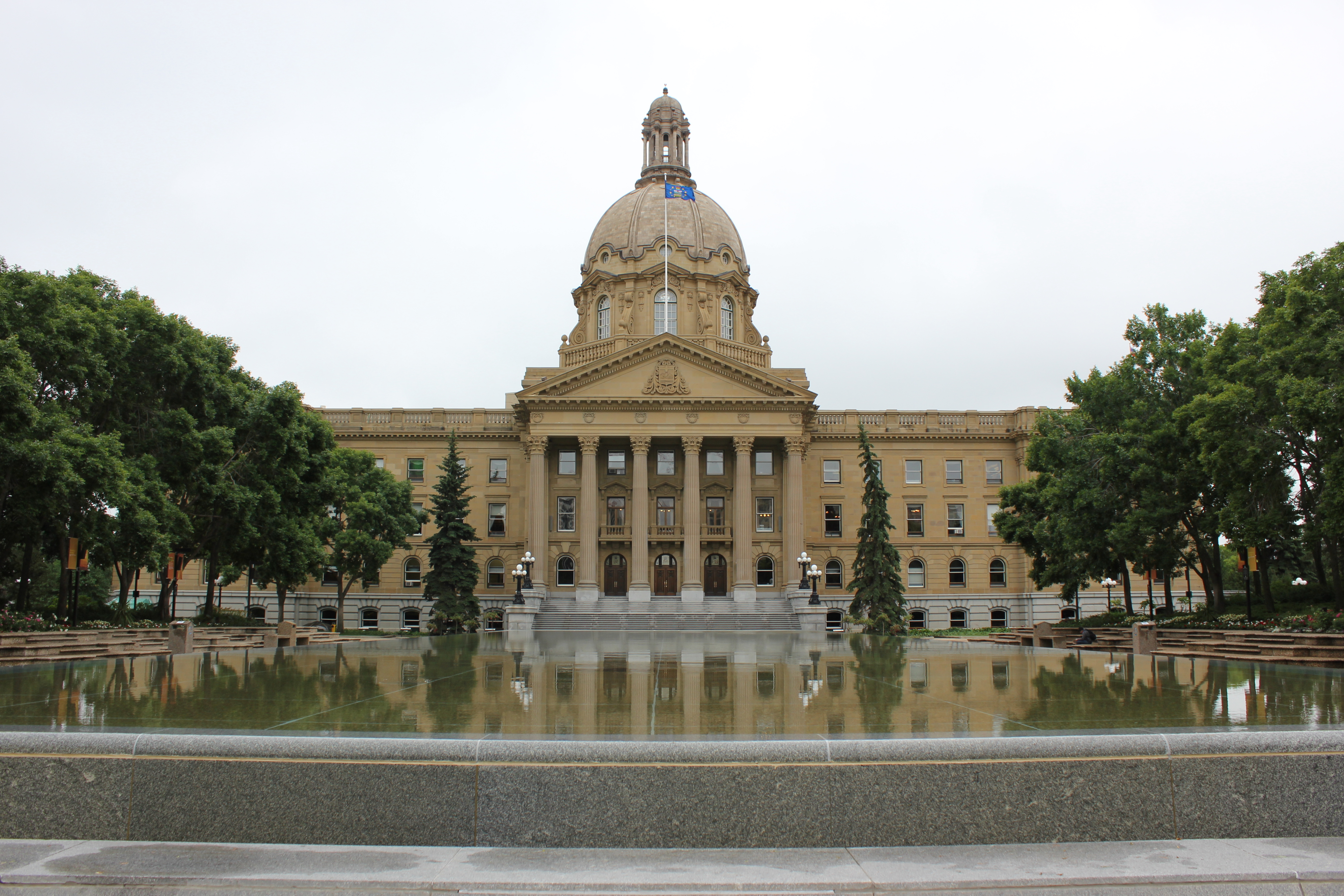

Legislative Assembly of Alberta
- Territorial extent: Alberta
- Passed by: Legislative Assembly of Alberta
- Passed: December 8, 2022
- Royal assent: December 15, 2022

Legislative history
- Bill title: Alberta Sovereignty Within a United Canada Act
- Bill citation: Bill 1
- Introduced by: Premier Danielle Smith
- First reading: November 29, 2022
- Second reading: December 6, 2022
- Third reading: December 8, 2022 (Note: Third Reading was carried 1:01 AM on December 8, 2022.)
- Status: In force

The Alberta Sovereignty Within a United Canada Act, commonly known as the Alberta Sovereignty Act, is an act introduced on November 29, 2022, the first day of the fall sitting of the 4th Session of the 30th Alberta Legislature by the Premier of Alberta, Danielle Smith, and passed on December 8, 2022. The act seeks to protect Alberta from federal laws and policies that the Albertan legislature deems to be unconstitutional or harmful to Albertans or the province's economic prosperity, in areas such as natural resources, gun control, COVID-19 public health, education, and agriculture.

The act directs "political entities"—including municipalities, school boards, municipal police forces, and regional health authorities—to not enforce "federal rules deemed harmful to Alberta's interests." A proposed use of the act would be triggered when a member of the Executive Council tables a motion in the Legislative Assembly identifying a specific federal law or policy that may be considered to be unconstitutional, in violation of the Canadian Charter of Rights and Freedoms or harmful to Albertans. After a Legislative Assembly debate on the merits of the resolution, all members would take part in a free vote on the "impugned law, ruling or regulatory decision". If passed, the resolution would be reviewed within two years.

Several law experts and professors said that the act could be unconstitutional. Treaty 6, 7, and 8 chiefs immediately stated their opposition to the act through news conferences and in public statements and criticized the government for not consulting with them. Alberta NDP leader Rachel Notley also stated her opposition to the act. A December 2022 Leger poll said that 32% of Albertans agreed that the act was "necessary to stand up to the federal government", against 42% who disagreed.

The Alberta Sovereignty Act was a key component of Smith's campaign when she successfully contested the United Conservative Party (UCP) leadership election in 2022, contributing to her election as UCP leader and appointment as Premier of Alberta.

== Background ==
The concept of an Alberta Sovereignty Act was the cornerstone of the policy document called the "Free Alberta Strategy", which has been described as the act's "unofficial blueprint". The 50-page September 2021 document was co-authored by Rob Anderson (former Wildrose Party MLA and lawyer), Barry Cooper (University of Calgary's political scientist), and Derek From (constitutional lawyer). It was described by its authors as a joint initiative with the Alberta Institute, a libertarian think tank founded in 2018 by Peter McCaffrey, who also is its president. Anderson was also Smith's campaign chair during the run-up to the 2022 United Conservative Party leadership election. Smith was not a part of the "Free Alberta Strategy" nor did she contribute to the document, but after reading it, she liked the idea of the sovereignty act. In a September 2022 National Post interview, Cooper clarified that the act itself was deliberately "unconstitutional" to put the federal government on notice that Alberta would "no longer recognize their claimed authority over provincial areas of constitutional sovereignty." The document also called for Alberta to replace the Canada Revenue Agency with its own tax collection service, establish a provincial police force to replace the RCMP, as well as an Alberta pension plan to replace the Canada Pension Plan. Cooper was also a co-author of the 2001 Firewall letter, which Smith—then a columnist and a 770 CHQR radio host—had referred to in her October 2019 Calgary Herald opinion piece, to enable Alberta to become—like Quebec—a "nation within a nation". In the op-ed, Smith called for a resurrection of the Firewall letter. During her 2022 leadership campaign, Smith said that the Alberta Sovereignty Act was not about separating from Canada but asserting the province's rights within Canada by self-governance of a "Nation within a Nation", similar to Quebec's self-governance and Saskatchewan's proposed Saskatchewan First Act.

When Smith was a contender in the 2022 UCP leadership election, she announced in a June 15 Twitter post that she would introduce the Alberta Sovereignty Act on her first day as premier. The act, also known as Bill 1, would give the province the authority to "refuse to enforce any federal law or policy that attacks Alberta's interest or our provincial rights." Smith said that Alberta should emulate British Columbia and Quebec in asserting citizens' rights. On June 16, Smith used the example of the lax enforcement of cannabis laws in British Columbia prior to its legalization through the 2018 federal Cannabis Act to explain how Alberta could opt out of enforcing federal law. The Alberta sovereignty act propelled her into office and became her signature piece of legislation.

A key feature of Canadian federalism is the way in which legislative powers are distributed among the different levels of government. Legislative powers of the provinces and the Parliament of Canada are set out in sections 91 to 95 of the Constitution Act, 1867. According to a 2022 Library of Parliament article, the Constitution of Canada has been described as a living tree in constitutional law, as it adapts to "new situations and new social realities". Historically, conflicts concerning jurisdiction, finances, culture, or perceived favouritism have occurred between provinces and each other, and with the federal government. These conflicts resulted in various independence movements—notably in Quebec—as well as attempts by provinces to define their authorities for themselves.

In the bill's third reading just before it was passed in the legislature, Premier Smith explained the justification for the "reset" in the provincial-federal relationship: "It's not like Ottawa is a national government. The way our country works is that we are a federation of sovereign, independent jurisdictions. They are one of those signatories to the Constitution and the rest of us, as signatories to the Constitution, have a right to exercise our sovereign powers in our own areas of jurisdiction."

== Legislative history ==
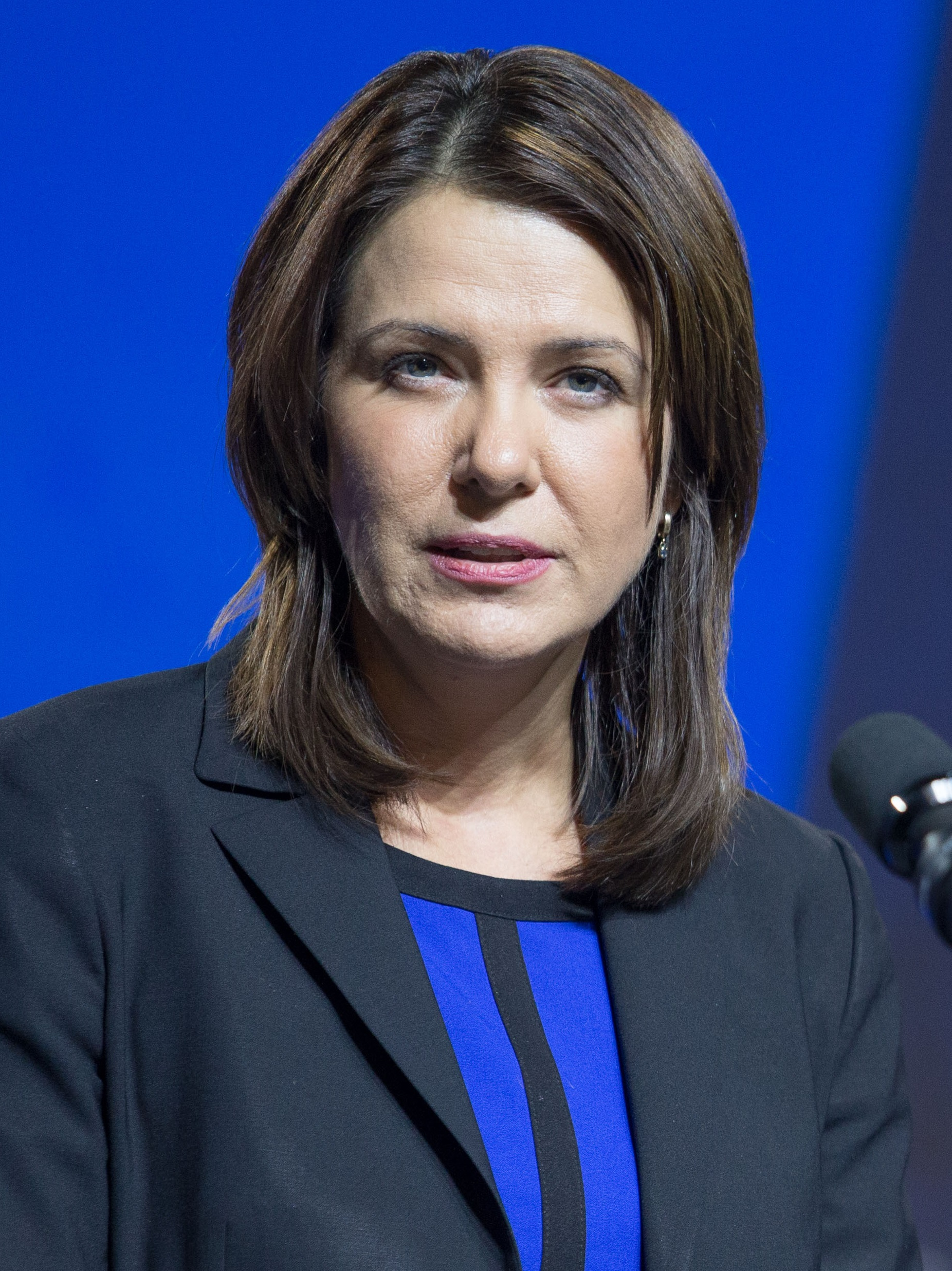
The Alberta Sovereignty Within a United Canada Act was introduced by Premier Danielle Smith.

The Alberta Sovereignty Within a United Canada Act was introduced by Premier Danielle Smith as Bill 1 of the fourth session of the 30th Alberta Legislature on November 29, 2022. The first reading was passed in a recorded division, as the opposition Alberta New Democratic Party (NDP) voted against the first reading of Bill 1. A recorded division of the assembly is a rare occurrence for a first reading in a Westminster system.

The government moved second reading of Bill 1 on November 30. Several NDP MLAs attempted to filibuster passage of second reading, with Deron Bilous and Nicole Goehring both moving reasoned amendments, in Canadian legislative bodies, if a reasoned amendment is adopted, it has the effect of defeating a bill, the reasoned amendments were defeated 9 for, 26 against and 9 for, 28 against respectively. Debate on second reading was ended on December 6, when the government passed a time allocation motion to force a vote on second reading. Second reading was passed with 30 for, 9 against.

The bill was then moved to a committee of the whole immediately after it had passed second reading, where the government proposed an amendment to remove the provisions in the bill that would have granted the cabinet unilateral powers to change laws or enact measures. The government then passed a time allocation motion on December 7 to force a vote on the amendment. The amendment was passed with 27 for, 12 against.

Immediately after it had completed the committee stage, third reading of the amended bill was moved. Again, several NDP MLAs attempted to filibuster passage of third reading, with Marie Renaud moving another reasoned amendment, which was defeated in a voice vote. Alberta NDP House Leader Christina Gray then moved a hoist motion, which was defeated 7 for, 27 against. Debate on third reading was ended late on the night of December 7–8 when the government passed a time allocation motion to force a vote on third reading. Third reading was passed with 27 for, 7 against.

The Alberta Sovereignty Within a United Canada Act received royal assent from Lieutenant Governor of Alberta Salma Lakhani on December 15.

== Rationale ==
The Alberta Sovereignty Within a United Canada Act is intended to prevent instances of alleged overreach by the federal government. Legislation and programs that have been viewed by the Alberta government as overreaching federal jurisdiction that may be considered as test cases for the act include the Impact Assessment Act and Canadian Energy Regulator Act, commonly known as Bill C-69, the federal government’s firearms buyback program, planned fertilizer emissions reductions, and conditional funding for health and social programs. Smith has also stated the Government of Alberta will challenge the federal government's Carbon Tax.

During her United Conservative Party leadership campaign, Smith listed a number of federal policies that may be unconstitutional or may be in violation of the Canadian Charter of Rights and Freedoms. Potential Charter violations includes federal mandatory vaccination policies, the use of the Emergencies Act in freezing protesters' funds and in jail terms for the organizers; federal censorship of Alberta-based news media, and the "mandatory participation by Albertans or information sharing by provincial agencies of Albertans’ personal data for the purpose of a Federal digital identification program". Included in the list of federal policies that she considered to be unconstitutional, are Bill C-69—which former Premier Jason Kenney referred to as the "No New Pipelines Act"; fertilizer reduction requirements; emissions and production reductions in the Alberta energy industry; reduction in fossil fuel electricity generation; and the federal government firearm restriction and buyback program.

Smith said that one example of how the Alberta Sovereignty Act could be implemented would be to place intra-provincial highway or power plant projects under the auspices of the provincial government instead of the federal government, therefore removing the project from the jurisdiction of the federal Impact Assessment Act. Another example would be to compel Alberta's credit unions to not comply with any future injunction of the Emergencies Act to freeze protesters' accounts.

=== Equalization payments ===
The rationale for the act is that Alberta in particular is considered unfairly treated by the rest of Canada, due to programs like the equalization payments that fund provinces with lower GDPs and environmental initiatives like the Northern Gateway Pipeline cancellation. Another issue is the perspective that the other provinces oppose the Albertan oil industry while enjoying the profits from it. The Government of Alberta held a referendum in 2021 asking if equalization should be removed from the constitution, with a turnout of 39% and a majority of 61% of those voting being in favour of removal.

== Contents ==
The Alberta Sovereignty Within a United Canada Act is intended to shield the province of Alberta from perceived overreach by the federal government in areas of provincial constitutional jurisdictions, including those outlined in Section 92 of the Constitution Act, 1867. Specific areas of concern brought forward by Danielle Smith include private property, natural resources, agriculture, firearms, regulation of the economy, health, education, and other social programs.

University of Calgary law professors, Martin Olszynski and Nigel Bankes note that the act has ten "operative sections". The bill includes a section on definitions and another on interpretation, a third clause describing the resolution process for triggering the law into action, a description of the Lieutenant Governor in Council's relevant powers, a section on time limits on special measures arising from application of the law, a section on potential effects of directives arising from the law, a section confirming that the Crown is bound by the act, a provision on immunity, another on a potential judicial review, and finally regulation authority.

The act compels "provincial entities" to follow directives issued by Executive Council, which may include defying or ignoring federal laws deemed to harm Alberta, be unconstitutional or to be in violation of the Charter. While the act compels provincial entities, it does not compel private companies or individuals to comply with a directive of Executive Council. Under section 1(e) of the act, provincial entities that may be compelled by a directive include provincial public agencies, Crown corporations, Alberta Health Services, post-secondary institutions, school boards, municipalities, and police services. Furthermore, section 1(e)(iv) includes a broad definition of entities that receive grant funding from the province of Alberta to provide a public service.

A proposed application of the act can be triggered with a motion introduced in the legislative assembly by the premier or any minister identifying a specific federal policy or regulation which is deemed by them to be unconstitutional, contrary to the Charter or "harmful" to Albertans. Following a debate of the resolution in the legislative assembly, an open vote would be held. The resolution would pass if a majority of Members of the Legislative Assembly vote in favour of the resolution. The legislature can make recommendations to cabinet on how to proceed on resolutions that require cabinet action.

As originally introduced to the legislature, once the resolution was passed, Bill 1 would grant the cabinet unilateral powers to change laws, and/or enact measures, which could include giving specific directives to "provincial entities". Cabinet could also take any other action that they are "legally able to take" relevant to the resolution. Amendments were introduced to require Cabinet to introduce any legislative changes to the legislature.

== Reaction ==
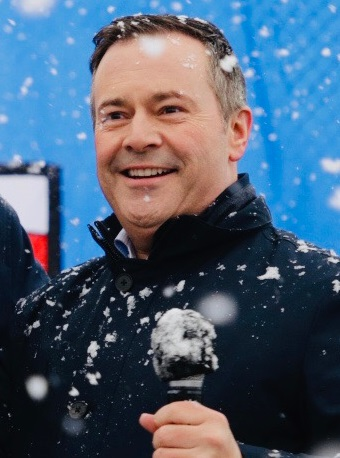
Outgoing Premier Jason Kenney was critical of the proposed Sovereignty Act.

The reaction by some politicians and legal scholars has been negative. Former premier Jason Kenney described it as a "full-frontal attack on the rule of law", as well as a step towards separation and a "banana republic".

Six of Smith's opponents in the leadership race criticized it. In a September 8 press conference, four of these contenders for the UCP leadership—Brian Jean, Travis Toews, Rajan Sawhney, and Leela Aheer—held a press conference specifically to speak out against the Alberta Sovereignty Act that Smith was proposing. By November 30, three of them—Brian Jean, Travis Toews and Rajan Sawhney—with ministerial posts in Premier Smith's cabinet—were ready to vote in favour of the bill because Smith had responded to their concerns, including the "separatism aspect".

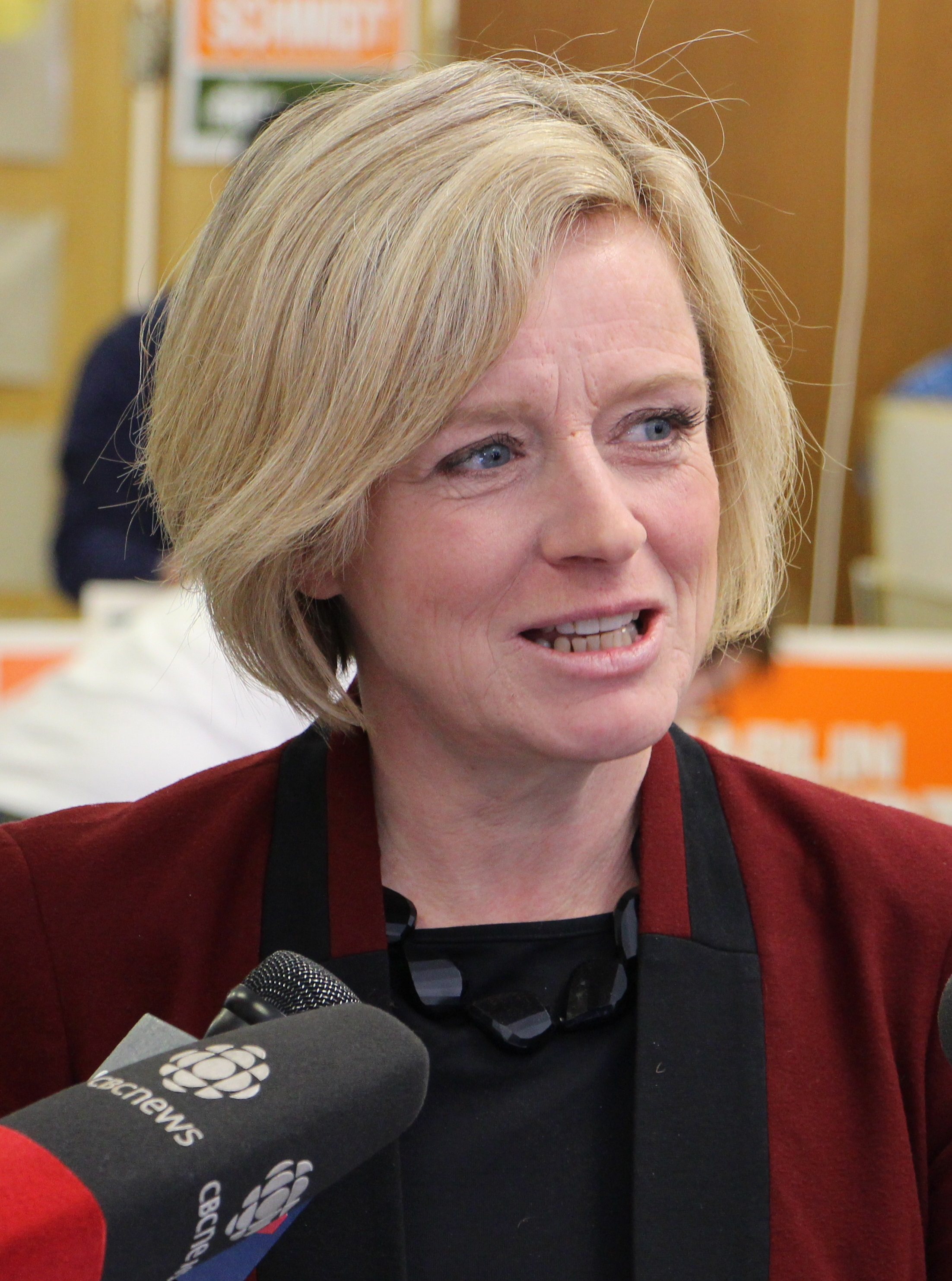
Leader of Alberta NDP and the Official Opposition Rachel Notley was critical of the proposed Sovereignty Act.

Opposition leader Rachel Notley described the act as a "thoughtless legal collection of mumbo jumbo...[that] creates nothing but uncertainty—and through that: economic uncertainty—at a time when Albertans are desperately looking for economic recovery." She described Premier Smith, Barry Cooper and their supporters as a "very extreme fringe of the Alberta population". Notley said that there are good arguments for Alberta to achieve greater control of its own "economic destiny" but Bill 1 was "completely and entirely disconnected from that object."

Chiefs representing Treaty 6, 7, and 8 publicly opposed the proposed legislation at a November 18 news conference held in Edmonton. Chief Tony Alexis of Alexis Nakota Sioux Nation, said that the Treaties are "international agreement[s] and the highest law to govern the land, resources, and our Peoples" on unceded territories. He added that, the proposed bill could potentially grant Alberta the right to "extract resources at an unprotected rate, exacerbating the fight for their rights to land and resources and moving them away from a sustainable future". Bearspaw First Nation's chief said that the province had not entered into any consultation with indigenous communities before proposing the sovereignty act. A statement released by Treaty 8 chiefs to Premier Smith, said that Treaties are the "exclusive reason of which Canada, and all the Provinces and Territories exist today" and that with this bill, the government of Alberta was acting in "dishonour of Treaty No. 8." In response to an APTN News request for a response to the November 18 press conference and releases, Premier Smith said that she will be booking meetings with Treaty chiefs to discuss the act. In statements released after Bill 1 was introduced, Treaty 6 chiefs said the sovereignty act could potentially apply to any federal law including treaties, which are "international agreements" that "take legal precedence over provincial and federal law". The Federation of Sovereign Indigenous Nations said that the even with amendments, they would not support Bill 1. In an interview with reporters, Alberta Indigenous relations minister, Rick Wilson, said that the UCP should have done more consultation on the bill as there was some "confusion among Indigenous leaders" in regards to the term "sovereignty". He said the act "respects treaty rights".

In an email with the National Post, University of Waterloo's constitutional law expert, Emmett Macfarlane, said that enacting a provincial law that declares a clear intent to attempt to 'negate' valid federal jurisdiction would almost certainly be considered to be exceeding the scope of provincial powers—ultra vires. Failing to enforce a federal law or regulation "would be blatantly unconstitutional", according to Macfarlane.

Law professors, Olszynski and Bankes identified three potential constitutional challenges to the Bill, including both the separation and the division of powers, as well as the "impermissible delegation of legislative authority"—the so-called Henry VIII clause. They added that the Bill 1 was both "significant" and "unprecedented" in the way in which it intrudes into Canada's superior courts' jurisdictions.

Director of the UBC Centre for Constitutional Law and Legal Studies, Geoffrey Sigalet, alongside PhD candidate and lawyer, Jesse Hartery, argued that the Canadian Constitution does not prevent provinces from declining to enforce federal laws and that the act "as written appears to be constitutional and consistent with our constitutional tradition, in which federalism is a foundational principle that does not entail central domination." However, they later added that "the bill can only be constitutional if it permits the province to exercise existing powers under our federal system. If it offends these principles in its application, then the courts will be justified in intervening. But we would reiterate that the fact that provincial non-enforcement is constitutional does not necessarily mean that it is advisable."

Lieutenant Governor Salma Lakhani said that she would evaluate the constitutionality of the legislation before granting royal assent. Typically, in the modern political environment, royal assent is an automatic process and viceroys defer to their premiers. The last time that a bill was not immediately granted royal assent in Alberta was in 1937 when Lieutenant Governor John C. Bowen reserved royal assent of the Bank Taxation Act, Credit of Alberta Regulation Act, 1937, and the Accurate News and Information Act until their legality could be tested at the Supreme Court of Canada. In Reference Re Alberta Statutes the Supreme Court struck down the three bills as ultra vires of the province's constitutional authority, and affirmed the authority of the lieutenant governor to reserve royal assent. The Supreme Court in responding to questions posed by the government of Alberta confirmed the validity of reservation, with the court unanimously confirming the powers were still in operation and exercisable. Justice Albert Hudson wrote "there is no room for serious argument" that reservation was no longer a valid power.

In a December 8 interview with Cooper as his guest on The Current, host Matt Galloway described Cooper as in "many ways the architect" of the act. Cooper, told Galloway that if Canada does not change the Constitution, the next option would be an Alberta independence referendum in reference to the 1980 and 1995 Quebec referendums.

During Question Period in the House on November 30, Jagmeet Singh, leader of the federal New Democratic Party, questioned the prime minister on the potential for the act to undermine Canadian federal laws. The prime minister said that he would wait to see how Albertans responded to the act as a "lot of eyebrows" were raised in Alberta. During the December 8 Assembly of First Nations special assembly in Ottawa, Prime Minister Trudeau responded to questions on the act, saying that it was being used by Premier Smith as a "political tool" to attempt to engage in a "fight" with the federal government. While he expressed "extreme concern" about what the act represented, he said he was not "interested in fighting with the Alberta government". The prime minister responded to concerns by delegates at the assembly that the act and Saskatchewan's Bill 88 were "shutting out Indigenous voices". He said that it was through the courts that disagreements between the federal and provincial governments can be settled.

A December 25 New York Times article said that the act "radically circumscribes federal authority, advancing the agenda of the province's far-right secessionist movement." Premier Smith's statement that Ottawa was not a "national government" was "widely disputed by constitutional experts", according to the article.

== See also ==
- Saskatchewan First Act
- Canadian sovereignty
- Nullification (U.S. Constitution)
