= Wildrose Independence Party of Alberta =

Provincial political party in Canada

- Active provincial party
- Leader: Vacant
- President: Rick Northey
- Founded: 29 June 2020; 6 years ago
- Merger of: Wexit Alberta, Freedom Conservative Party of Alberta
- Headquarters: Unit 163 17008 – 90 Ave Edmonton, AB T5T 1L6
- Membership (2021): 8,000
- Ideology: Western separatism; Conservatism; Economic liberalism
- Political position: Right-wing
- Colours: Blue; Red; Green
- Slogan: "Our Freedom Cannot Wait!"
- Seats in Legislature: 0 / 87

Website
- wipalberta.com

Wildrose Independence Party of Alberta is a provincial political party in Alberta, Canada, which was formed through the merger of Wexit Alberta and the Freedom Conservative Party of Alberta in 2020.

== Views ==
According to its constitution, Wexit Alberta's plans included abolishing the provincial branch of the Royal Canadian Mounted Police and the reestablishment of the Alberta Provincial Police. It also called for the adoption of a currency to replace the Canadian dollar.

== History ==
=== Wexit Alberta movement ===
The Wexit movement gained traction in October 2019, shortly after the 2019 Canadian federal election, when the Liberal Party under Prime Minister Justin Trudeau was re-elected to form government. In August 2019, Wexit Alberta held several meetings including a small summer meeting in Calgary’s beltline. A few months later another meeting in Calgary drew about 1,700 attendees.

On January 11, 2020, a Wexit rally was held at the Alberta legislature grounds with the goal of collecting the 8,400 signatures required for official party status.

Wexit reserved the name "Wexit Alberta" with Elections Alberta for use by a provincial party.

On April 27, 2020, Wexit Alberta and the Freedom Conservative Party of Alberta announced plans to merge into the Wildrose Independence Party of Alberta. Members of those parties voted to approve the merger on June 29, 2020. The parties needed to finalize a unification agreement before the new party could be registered with Elections Alberta. The name was reserved with Elections Alberta. On July 23, 2020, the party was officially registered with Elections Alberta.

On July 17, 2020, the party announced that Paul Hinman would serve as its interim leader, until the party's founding convention and leadership contest. Hinman confirmed his intention to run in the first leadership contest.

In October 2020, the board of the unregistered People's Party of Alberta voted to dissolve the party in favour of supporting the efforts of the Wildrose Independence Party.

The party held its founding convention on January 23, 2021 virtually due to COVID-19 restrictions. According to the party, 478 members were registered to attend and vote on policy, approve a constitution, and elected a new Board of Governors. The party announced that the leadership election would run from June 5 to August 27, concluding with a vote on August 28, 2021, but on July 20, 2021, Hinman was declared to have been elected leader of the party.

=== Leadership dispute with Hinman ===
Paul Hinman ran in the 2022 Fort McMurray-Lac La Biche by-election. Hinman was not a resident of the Fort McMurray or Lac La Biche regions, but denied he was an opportunist or ignorant of local issues facing the riding. He told Fort McMurray Today he was running as a candidate because he felt it was “the most important election in Alberta’s near-term history." He said he had stopped supporting Kenney and the UCP because he felt "Jason Kenney and the UCP have betrayed us by not standing up to Ottawa."

Hinman finished third in the by-election, behind NDP candidate Ariana Mancini and UCP MLA Brian Jean. After the by-election, the party began a review of Hinman's leadership and his performance in the campaign. After the review concluded, he was removed as party leader on June 28, 2022.

The review accused Hinman of paying himself with party money during the by-election. The review also wrote that Hinman was not familiar with the needs and concerns shared by people living in the riding, despite his commentary on community issues at local forums and in interviews with Harvard Media's CFVR-FM and Fort McMurray Today. The review was not released publicly, but a copy was leaked to the Western Standard.

Hinman denied all of the party's accusations against him. He told CTV News that the party was being taken over by "implants, plants, agents inside our board" who are opposed to an independent Alberta. Hinman was reinstated as leader during the party's annual general meeting in Red Deer on July 23, 2022. The party's board of governors were forced out.

A Court of King's Bench justice ruled on October 21, 2022 that Hinman had been legally removed as leader of the party. Jeevan Mangat was named interim party leader. Hinman is appealing the decision. The party's board also accused Hinman and his supporters of disrupting the AGM and pressuring people to either leave or support Hinman. They are suing Hinman for $180,000.

=== Mangat leadership ===
After assuming the interim party leadership, Mangat ran in the 2022 Brooks-Medicine Hat provincial by-election, finishing last with 0.44%.

In the 2023 Alberta general election, the party endorsed the United Conservative Party in electoral districts where the Wildrose Independence Party was not fielding a candidate. The party ended up only running 2 candidates.

Mangat remained as the interim leader until early 2026, when he was no longer listed as the leader on the Elections Alberta website, leaving the position vacant. He left the party and joined the United Conservative Party.

== Leaders ==
| Leader | Term in office | | Notes |
|---|---|---|---|
| Paul Hinman | July 17, 2020 | October 21, 2022 | Interim leader from July 17, 2020 to July 20, 2021 |
| Jeevan Mangat | October 21, 2022 | 2026 | Interim |

== Results ==
| Election | Leader | Candidates | Votes | % | Seats | +/- | Place | Position |
|---|---|---|---|---|---|---|---|---|
| 2023 | Jeevan Mangat | 2 / 87 | 820 | 0.05% | 0 / 87 | 0 | ▲9th | No seats |

=== By-elections ===
| By-election | Date | Candidate | Votes | % | Place |
|---|---|---|---|---|---|
| Fort McMurray-Lac La Biche | March 15, 2022 | Paul Hinman | 628 | 10.75% | 3/8 |
| Brooks-Medicine Hat | November 8, 2022 | Jeevan Mangat | 56 | 0.44% | 5/5 |

== See also ==
- Western alienation
- Alberta separatism
