= Canadian Federation of Independent Business =

Non-profit business organization

- English logo
- Formation: 1971; 55 years ago
- Founder: John Bulloch
- Headquarters: Toronto, Ontario
- President: Dan Kelly
- Website: www.cfib.ca

The Canadian Federation of Independent Business (CFIB) is a non-profit business organization representing Canadian owners of small and mid-size enterprises (SMEs). The CFIB advocates on behalf of small business to improve tax policy, laws, and regulation. It also provides advice and support to its members on regulations and human resource issues.

The CFIB has approximately 100,000 member businesses as of 2025. (Note: Membership numbers were reported as 110,000 in 2020.) It has offices located across the country.

In 2012, Dan Kelly became the CFIB president and CEO. He succeeded Catherine Swift.

== History ==
Born out of a 1969 tax protest, the Canadian Federation of Independent Business was officially founded in 1971 by John Bulloch, a small business owner and business professor at Ryerson Polytechnical Institute, now Toronto Metropolitan University (TMU). Bulloch had formed The Canadian Council for Fair Taxation in 1969 to fight a white paper on taxation proposed by the then Minister of Finance, Edgar Benson. Under the terms of the white paper, Canadian small businesses faced the prospect of an increased tax rate of 50%. The proposal was ultimately withdrawn and the CCFT was succeeded by the enduring CFIB.

== Membership ==
Members must be Canadian-based privately owned companies. Business size is not a criterion for membership.

== Fundraising ==
CFIB's sole source of funding is membership dues; it receives no donations or government funds. As of 2015, the fees ranged from a minimum of $250 a year to $3,500 a year, depending on the size of the business.

== Political activity ==
The CFIB describes itself as a non-partisan political advocacy organization that is willing to work with all federal and provincial parties. Telfer School of Business professor Gilles LeVasseur says political parties all look at the CFIB as "the only credible organization that deals with small and medium-sized businesses".

In 2015, the CFIB had evolved from an organization that exclusively courted the Conservative Party of Canada to one that strives for a broader appeal, according to LeVasseur. CFIB CEO Dan Kelly countered that the perception of ties to the Conservative Party existed only because the Tories had been in power for a long time, and the CFIB had a good relationship with Paul Martin's Liberal Party when they were in power.

=== Political positions ===
The CFIB has lobbied for a reduction in government red tape, and for no increase to payroll taxes. It advocates for freezes to Canada Pension Plan contributions, employment insurance premiums, and additional sick days, and supports the interests of small businesses in relation to federal and provincial government procurement.

In 2015, Kelly said that increasing the minimum wage for employees in federally-regulated industries to $15 was a "dumb policy".

The CFIB has opposed big bank mergers in Canada. It opposed changes to the temporary foreign worker program in 2014.

The CFIB was at odds with the Harper government when it ended the long-form census.

=== Positions during the 2019 Federal election ===
During the 2019 Canadian federal election, the CFIB sided with the United States in criticizing the longstanding Universal Postal Union fees for Chinese shipments. A spokesperson stated that "the United States is raising a valid point about unfairness in international trade. Businesses in China have an unfair advantage when they can ship to a customer in the US or Canada for less than it would cost a Canadian business to ship to that same customer." The Canadian government ultimately supported the United States' position at an extraordinary congress of the union.

=== Positions during the 2020 Coronavirus Pandemic ===
In March 2020, at the beginning of the COVID-19 pandemic, the CFIB released a survey of their member businesses that found one third feared imminent closures without significant government assistance. The CFIB criticized Prime Minister Trudeau's March 24 proposal of a 10% wage subsidy for businesses for a maximum of $25,000 as "a drop in the bucket of what is absolutely necessary right now, and certainly a fraction of what is happening in Western Europe." The next year, in July 2021, the CFIB asked the federal government for further subsidies for businesses.

Emergency benefit programs became a flashpoint when employers wanted to recall workers. CFIB president Dan Kelly said that the Canadian Emergency Response Benefit (CERB) "created a disincentive to return to work for some staff" especially in industries like hospitality where 45% of recalled employees declined the offer to return to work.

A poll by the CFIB in July 2020 found around 27% of 3,389 employers polled indicated that some of their laid-off staff refused to return to work. Of the nearly 870 businesses that provided reasons their employees gave, 62% reported workers prefer the CERB. (More than one explanation could be provided, and 47% of employers said workers cited concern for health, and 27% cited childcare obligations). In a Canadian Press interview, Ian Robb, Canadian director of the Unite Here union that represents hospitality workers said that safety concerns were the issue, not the CERB, since "Nobody wants to stay home and make two grand when they can make double that by working."

Following changes to employee support programs announced in August 2020, CFIB president Dan Kelly said he was concerned that some workers would become able to collect employment insurance benefits for up to 26 weeks after showing only 120 hours of work over the past year, saying "This is just too low a bar and will serve as a disincentive for many part-time workers to return to their pre-COVID employment." He added that retail, hospitality, and service sector businesses, the sectors hardest hit by the pandemic, would struggle to bring back their part-time workforce.

== Research ==
CFIB produces research on the Canadian small and medium-sized business sector, based on the views and experiences its members. Issues of concern to the Canadian SME community are identified by CFIB members through surveys, opinion polls and face-to-face visits. Those views and opinions are then delivered to all three levels of government in the form of research reports, meetings and testimony. These concerns are far ranging but typically include tax policy, labour policies and regulatory policy. One of CFIB's regular reports is the "Business Barometer", a monthly research report detailing the economic expectations of Canada's small businesses. CFIB also holds an annual "Red Tape Awareness Week" when they release research reports that advocate for the elimination or improvement of outdated or redundant regulations.
