= Alberta Highway 873 =

Highway in Alberta

Highway 873

Route information
- Maintained by Alberta Transportation; City of Brooks
- Length: 57.4 km (35.7 mi)

Major junctions
- South end: Range Road 162 near Rainier
- Highway 36 near Rainier; Highway 542 in Brooks; Highway 1 (TCH) in Brooks
- North end: Highway 550 in Duchess

Location
- Country: Canada
- Province: Alberta
- Specialized and rural municipalities: County of Newell
- Major cities: Brooks
- Villages: Duchess

Highway system
- Alberta Numbered Highway Network; List; Former
← Highway 872	→ Highway 875

Highway 873 is a highway in southern Alberta, Canada. It generally runs north–south from Range Road 162 near the Hamlet of Rainier, through the City of Brooks to Highway 550 in Village of Duchess.

== Route description ==
Highway 873 is a two-lane undivided highway in the County of Newell that begins as an east–west route at the intersection of Range Road 162 and Township Road 164, 1.6 km (1.0 mi) west of Rainer. It travels east to the intersection of Highway 36 where it becomes a gravel highway and continues east along the south end of Lake Newell to Highway 535, where it turns north and continues towards Kinbrook Island Provincial Park, where at the park entrance it once again becomes a paved highway. Highway 873 continues north where it enters Brooks along 7 Street E where it follows a series of city streets, a short concurrency with Highway 542, and leaves Brooks along 2 Street W, the city's main commercial strip. It crosses the Trans-Canada Highway (Highway 1) at the city's northern boundary and continues north past Highway 544 to Duchess where it ends at the intersection of Highway 550. The roadway continues north as Range Road 144.

== History ==
The section of Highway 873 between Brooks and Duchess has had multiple designations in its history. Along with Highway 550, the route was originally designated as part of Highway 2, which at the time was an east–west inter-provincial highway that ran through Calgary and Medicine Hat (the present-day Highway 2 was designated as Highway 1). In 1941, Highway 2 was renumbered to Highway 1 to allow for continual numbering through Western Canada along the future Trans-Canada Highway, which was commissioned in 1949. In the mid-1950s, the Trans-Canada Highway was realigned between Brooks and Bassano, resulting in the Duchess-Bassano section being decommissioned and the Brooks-Duchess section becoming part of Highway 36. In the 1970s, Highway 36 north was realigned to align with the Highway 1/36 (south) junction located west of Brooks, resulting in the Brooks-Duchess section becoming Highway 873.

== Major intersections ==
From south to north:

Rural/specialized municipality	Location	km	mi	Destinations	Notes
County of Newell		0.0	0.0	Range Road 162 / Township Road 164	Highway 873 southern terminus
County of Newell	Rainier	1.6	0.99	Range Road 161	
County of Newell		6.8	4.2	Highway 36 – Brooks, Taber	
County of Newell		18.2	11.3	Highway 535 west – Tilley	
County of Newell		23.4	14.5	PAR 103 west – Kinbrook Island Provincial Park	
City of Brooks		37.0	23.0	Sutherland Drive 7 Street E	Highway 873 turns onto Sutherland Drive; shortcut route continues north on 7 Street E (trucks prohibited)
City of Brooks		38.1	23.7	Cassils Road (Highway 542 east)	Highway 873 follows Cassils Road; southern end of Highway 542 concurrency
City of Brooks		38.8	24.1	7 Street E / Lakewood Road	Shortcut route along 7 Street E (trucks prohibited)
City of Brooks		39.7	24.7	2 Street W – City Centre Cassils Road (Highway 542 west)	Highway 873 follows 2 Street W; northern end of Highway 542 concurrency
City of Brooks		41.8	26.0	Highway 1 (TCH) – Calgary, Medicine Hat	Interchange
County of Newell		52.7	32.7	Highway 544 – Patricia, Dinosaur Provincial Park	
County of Newell	Duchess	57.4	35.7	Highway 550 west – Rosemary, Bassano Range Road 144	Highway 873 northern terminus
1.000 mi = 1.609 km; 1.000 km = 0.621 mi: Concurrency terminus
