= Palliser Region =

Region in Alberta, Canada

Coordinates: 50°N 111°W

The Palliser Region is an area in the southeast corner of the province of Alberta, Canada that has been delineated and is serviced by the Palliser Economic Partnership. It borders the Canadian province of Saskatchewan to the east, and the US state of Montana to the south. It covers an area of 43,504 km^{2} (16,797 sq mi) The total population of the area stood at 112,314 in 2009. The city of Medicine Hat, with a population of 61,097, is the area's largest urban centre.

The Palliser Region is the traditional territory of the Blackfoot Confederacy, who hunted bison throughout the area. From 1857 to 1860, the area was explored as part of the Palliser Expedition, led by John Palliser. He described the area of southeast Alberta and southwest Saskatchewan – now known as the Palliser Triangle – as semi-arid, and warned that it was unsuitable for agricultural development. European settlement began with the arrival of the North-West Mounted Police in the mid 19th century. Fort Walsh was established by Police Inspector James Morrow Walsh, who became a good friend of Sitting Bull when he led the Sioux to the area after the Battle of Little Big Horn.

Despite the area's semi-arid climate, the British government encouraged farmers to settle in the region. They struggled with drought up until the end of the 1930s, and many settlers abandoned their farms due to crop failure, but dryland farming techniques introduced by the Prairie Farm Rehabilitation Administration eventually transformed the region into a successful agricultural centre. The region's geography is characterized by grasslands – including the Cypress Hills – and classic badlands country. The region receives more than 2,512 hours of sunshine per year on average, making it the sunniest area in Canada.

The three fastest growing economic sectors in the Palliser Region are Mining and Oil and Gas Extraction, Professional, Scientific and Technical Services, and Finance, Insurance, Real Estate and Leasing. Employment in the region is currently increasing at more than double the Canadian average. The Palliser Region is intersected by two major highways, #1 and #3 on the east–west axis, connecting it to the rest of Canada, and two secondary highways, #36 and #41, on the north–south axis, which connect it to the US border. It is served by the Canadian Pacific Railway, which connects it to the rest of North America via connections with its affiliates. This transportation infrastructure is key to the region's economy, which is based on agriculture, oil and gas, manufacturing, defence and aerospace, and tourism.

== History ==
The Palliser Region is the traditional territory of the First Nations of the Blackfoot Confederacy – particularly the Siksika (also called Blackfoot), the Blood (or Kainai) and the Northern Peigan (or Aapátohsipikáni). The Gros Ventres also used the area until they relocated to a reservation in eastern Montana in 1861.

These were nomadic peoples, who followed game, particularly the bison (or American buffalo) throughout the seasons. Their hunting grounds extended through Montana to the Missouri River, eastward along the Cypress Hills and northwards as far as the Wetaskiwin area. Everything to the north and east of this was considered the territory of the Cree – indeed, after the Riel Rebellion, when Mekastino (also called Red Crow), chief of the Blood First Nation, and Crowfoot, chief of the Siksika, were taken on a trip to Ottawa, they were familiar with the country as far east as Swift Current, but after that were out of their element.

The nations of the Blackfoot Confederacy had always hunted the bison, but the reintroduction of the horse to the American continent by the Spanish conquistadors, the "buffalo culture", with the bison at the basis of life, became extremely strong. By the time of European contact the members of these First Nations were highly skilled riders, breeders and all-round horsemen.

The Cypress Hills area was also used by the neighbouring Cree and Assiniboine First Nations, the enemies of the Blackfoot Confederacy. Some sources report that the Cypress Hills area was considered neutral territory, and did not belong to any particular First Nation. The hills were a source of medicine plants that could not be found on the prairie, and, when bison were scarce, deer, elk and squirrel could be hunted there.

From 1857 to 1860, a large area of Rupert's Land – now southwest Saskatchewan and southeast Alberta – was explored as part of the Palliser Expedition, led by John Palliser. Born into the Irish aristocracy, Palliser eschewed the comforts of his wealth to travel the world. His particular interest lay in British North America, and in 1856 he accepted an offer from the Royal Geographical Society to lead a full scientific expedition to Rupert's Land. The three reports and map that were submitted to the Royal Geographical Society and to the Colonial Office by the expedition were instrumental in opening the region to settlement, and proved to be invaluable tools for the North-West Mounted Police, boundary surveyors and railway planners. Palliser found that the entire region was suitable for agriculture, except for one semi-arid region that became known as the Palliser Triangle.

Up until 1870, the region was nominally under the control of the Hudson's Bay Company, although there was essentially no law enforcement. In 1873 a skirmish between white and Métis traders and members of the Assiniboine First Nation, which came to be known as the Cypress Hills Massacre, prompted Prime Minister John A. Macdonald to create the North-West Mounted Police. In 1875 they established Fort Walsh, named after its builder, Inspector James Morrow Walsh. The following year, when Sioux leader Sitting Bull led his people into Canada after the Battle of Little Big Horn, they arrived at Fort Walsh. Sitting Bull and James Walsh became such good friends that Walsh was criticized for not pursuing Canadian government policy and forcing the Sioux back into the United States.

By the late 1880s, the huge herds of bison had virtually disappeared. This led to a time of great hardship for the First Nation peoples, who at times had to rely on handouts from the North-West Mounted Police at Fort Walsh to survive. Starvation compelled many First Nations to settle on reserves allotted by the federal government. This, coupled with the building of the Canadian Pacific Railway, opened the way for white settlement throughout the area.

Despite the fact that John Palliser, and later surveyor William Pearce, had warned that the Palliser Region was a semi-desert useless for farming, their assessments were ignored in the rush to settle the area. As early as the late 1910s and early 1920s, however, farmers were abandoning the area. By 1926, about 6,400 farms had been abandoned, and 17,000 people had left. This was primarily due to the weather: from 1915 to 1930 the mean daily maximum temperature in the Medicine Hat area was 30 °C (86 °F), and the entire year's precipitation was at times as low as 20 cm (8 in.).

The region's farmers continued to suffer throughout the drought of the 1930s, and by the end of that decade almost 100,000 settlers had left the area. However, by that time, the solution was already in sight: in 1935, the federal government under Prime Minister R. B. Bennett established the Prairie Farm Rehabilitation Administration (PFRA). The PFRA, under the local leadership of Asael E. Palmer, superintendent of the experimental station at Lethbridge, promoted dryland farming techniques and created widespread irrigation projects. In the end, as a result of these measures, almost 200,000 km^{2}. (77,000 sq. mi.) of drought-ravaged land were reclaimed within the province. The techniques established by the PFRA laid the foundation for the successful agriculture industry which flourishes in the Palliser Region to this day.

== Geography and climate ==
The Palliser Region is part of the 30 million acres (120,000 km^{2}) of Alberta's grasslands, which are in turn part of the Great Plains that stretch from the Gulf of Mexico north into Canada. The region is a flat to gently rolling plain, with a few major hill systems, including the Cypress Hills.

The rivers in the region are part of either the Saskatchewan River or Missouri River systems. Badlands have developed where valleys are carved deeply into the bedrock. The formations typical of badlands – canyons, ravines, gullies and hoodoos – are common in the area. Dinosaur Provincial Park, one of the richest sources of dinosaur fossils in the world and a UNESCO World Heritage Site, is located within the badlands.

The region benefits from a comfortable, semi-arid climate, with generally dry, hot summers and cold, sunny winters interspersed with warm Chinook winds. It receives more than 2,512 hours of sunshine per year on average, making it the sunniest area in Canada.

Annual days of sunshine, on average	330
Average annual precipitation	333.8 mm
Average growing season	Over 120 days
January temperatures	High −4.5 °C (23.9 °F); low −15.9 °C (3.3 °F)
July temperatures	High 26.9 °C (80.4 °F); low 12 °C (53.6 °F)

The Palliser Region is home to a number of individual communities. They include: the cities of Brooks and Medicine Hat; the County of Forty Mile No. 8, the County of Newell, and Cypress County; the Municipal District of Acadia No. 34; Alberta's three special areas (No. 2, No. 3 and No. 4); the towns of Bassano, Bow Island, Hanna, Oyen, and Redcliff; and the villages of Cereal, Duchess, Empress, Foremost, Rosemary, Tilley and Youngstown.

== Demographics ==
The Palliser Region's population has been growing steadily for the last twenty years. The population has grown by 1.5% over the last decade, almost 1.5 times faster than the rest of Canada.

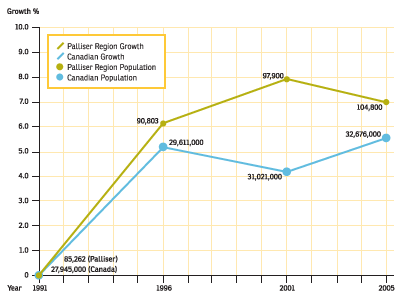
Population graph

The population and dwelling counts of the cities, towns, municipal districts and special areas within the Palliser Region from the Canada 2011 Census are as follows:

Name	Status	Population	Dwellings
Acadia No. 34, M.D. of	Municipal district	495	161
Bassano	Town	1,282	585
Bow Island	Town	2,025	670
Brooks	City	13,676	5,509
Cypress County	Municipal district	7,214	3,040
Forty Mile No. 8, County of	Municipal district	3,336	965
Hanna	Town	2,673	1,317
Medicine Hat	City	60,005	27,342
Newell, County of	Municipal district	6,786	2,480
Oyen	Town	973	418
Redcliff	Town	5,588	2,195
Special Areas No. 2	Special area	2,025	745
Special Areas No. 3	Special area	1,122	455
Special Areas No. 4	Special area	1,352	501

Within these major municipalities, 28.3% of the population over 15 years old has obtained a high school certificate and equivalent. 12% have a trades certification, 20.7% have a college diploma or some university, and 8.3% have a university degree. English is by far the predominant language, with 93.7% of respondents saying that this is the language spoken at home. 8.7% of the population describes themselves as immigrants, and only 2.9% identify themselves as First Nations, with 74% of those living in Medicine Hat.

== Infrastructure ==
The Palliser Region is crossed by an effective network of highways, linking the area to Saskatchewan in the east, western Alberta and British Columbia in the west, Montana and the rest of the United States in the south, and northern Alberta in the north. The TransCanada Highway #1 crosses the region from the Saskatchewan border to Medicine Hat, and then proceeds northwest to Calgary. Highway #3 goes southeast from Medicine Hat to Lethbridge. Highway #36 begins at Warner, and then proceeds north through Taber. Highway #41 crosses the Canada/US border at Wild Horse, MT/Wild Horse, AB, and joins the Trans Canada just east of Medicine Hat. The border crossing is open 7 days a week, with seasonally varying hours.

Over 100 trucking companies serve the Palliser Region, travelling the highways and meeting the needs of the agriculture, petroleum and other industries in southeast Alberta. Greyhound Bus Lines maintains a depot in downtown Medicine Hat and offers service to centres across the region.

The Medicine Hat Municipal Airport (IATA: YXH, ICAO: CYXH), located 6 km (3.7 mi) southwest of the town centre, is the region's only commercial airport. It is served by Central Mountain Air and offers daily flights to Calgary. The Bar XH Air Inc. charter company also uses the airport. General aviation airports in the region are located in Bow Island, Bassano, Brooks, Foremost, Hanna and Oyen.

The Canadian Pacific Railway operates the predominant railway system in the Palliser Region. Its main line crosses the border with Saskatchewan and proceeds east to Medicine Hat, splitting at that point to run south through the Crowsnest Pass to British Columbia, and north through Calgary. This rail line links the region to principal centres in Canada from Montreal to Vancouver, and to the northeast and Midwest United States. The Canadian National Railway crosses into Alberta from Saskatchewan and stops at Oyen. Through a series of marketing alliances and interline agreements, both railways can extend their markets throughout the United States and Mexico.

Quality water treatment, sewage and waste facilities are available throughout the region, and a variety of electricity and natural gas providers offer local service. The City of Medicine Hat actually owns the gas production, gas distribution, electric generation and electric distribution utilities that serve its customers. The city is also working on a solar-thermal project which would use solar energy to produce steam to run a portion of its power plant – and which would make Medicine Hat the first Canadian city to use this system.

Telecommunications in the Palliser Region are handled in part through the Alberta SuperNet, which connects public institutions across the province and currently serves 429 communities. Internet service providers are able to "piggyback" onto the SuperNet network, making it possible to access high-speed Internet service throughout the region. Residents of the Special Areas can access high-speed through Netago Wireless, which has worked with the local government to make service available.

== Economy ==
Forestry, fishing, mining, and oil and gas account for 15% of employment in the Palliser Region. There are also healthy manufacturing and service sectors, and a growing tourism industry. The three fastest growing economic sectors are Mining and Oil and Gas Extraction, which grew by 55.4% from 2000 and 2005, Professional, Scientific and Technical Services, which grew by 41%, and Finance, Insurance, Real Estate and Leasing, which grew by 22.9%. Employment in the region is currently increasing at a rate of 2.9% per year, more than double the Canadian average.

In 2004, the Palliser Region employed 10,000 people in the agriculture industry, an increase of almost 50% since 2001. The region is home to 3,600 farms, totaling 3.73 million hectares, with an average farm size of 1,023 hectares. These farms account for $1.23 billion in gross farm receipts and $6.85 billion in total farm capital. The nearly 5,200 farm operators in the region farm 1,080,494 hectares of land in crops. There are about 840,000 cattle and calves in the region (about 13% of the provincial total) and just under 207,000 pigs (approximately 10% of the provincial total). The region is also home to a greenhouse industry led by Red Hat Co-op, a producer-run cooperative that markets greenhouse crops. Over 80% of Alberta's dry beans, chick peas and lentils are grown in the region, making it a major pulse centre.

The construction and professional, scientific and technical services industry (of which engineering is a part) employed 8,200 workers in the region in 2006, an increase of 37% over 2001. This industry accounts for 10% of total employment in the Palliser Region. The region is home to diverse establishments in the engineering and construction industry, employing an estimated 4,255 people in the City of Medicine Hat alone. There are also 4,800 people employed in the construction sector in the region. To supply skills to the industry, Medicine Hat College offers apprenticeship training in carpentry, plumbing, welding and other trades.

Thanks to the presence of a Defence Research and Development Canada (DRDC) research centre at Canadian Forces Base (CFB) Suffield, the defence and aerospace industry is a dynamic sector in the Palliser Region, with further growth projected through the addition of new training programs. DRDC Suffield conducts research in tactical weapon systems, military engineering, munitions and firepower, and defence against chemical, biological, radiological and explosive hazards. Several local companies have benefited from working closely with DRDC and the licensing of DRDC technologies. The Palliser Region is also home to the Canadian Centre for Unmanned Vehicle Systems, a research, development, testing, evaluation and commercialization centre aimed at accelerating the growth in the sector.

Due to its natural gas reserves, the Palliser Region is able to supply a large portion of Alberta's raw resources to produce petrochemicals and specialty chemicals used in the production of plastics, antifreeze, film, fibers and other products. The chemicals and rubber industry employs about 660 workers, or 2% of the workforce, in the Palliser Region. Large natural gas reserves in the region are in shallow reservoirs, resulting in a high exploration success rate and low development and production costs. There are also numerous coals deposits in the Belly River formation throughout the Palliser Region providing opportunities for thermal coals/mine and electric generation.

The region is also home to abundant deposits of low temperature clays, including kaolinite and bentonite. The City of Medicine Hat has a long history of producing clay products, including pottery, bathroom fixtures and brick. The low cost and convenience of natural gas is of great advantage to the industry.

A variety of locations within the Palliser Region have been used in movie productions, including Unforgiven (1991), Texas Rangers (1999), Ararat (2002), An Unfinished Life (2005) and RV (2006). The region's natural assets, including Cypress Hills Interprovincial Park, Dinosaur Provincial Park and the badlands, are the focus of most of its tourist activity.

== Culture, recreation and media ==
Medicine Hat is home to the Esplanade Arts & Heritage Centre, which combines an art gallery, museum and theatre under one roof and is also home to the area's archives. The Esplanade was built in 2005 as one of Alberta's Centennial Legacy Projects.

Performing arts groups in the Palliser Region include a concert society in Brooks, a theatre group in Foremost and a blues group in Bow Island. In addition, the Medicine Hat College Theatre is host to numerous groups who provide regular theatre productions, including the Medicine Hat Musical Theatre Association. Festivals in the area include the Medicine Hat Jazz Festival, the Annual Polka Festival, the Ralston Arts Festival, the City of Medicine Hat Rotary Music Festival and the Annual Young Artist's Concerto Competition.

The Hidden Valley Ski Area in Cypress Hills Interprovincial Park offers both downhill and cross-country skiing, as well as winter hiking opportunities. There are also more than 15 golf courses in the region. Water recreation opportunities can be found at recreational reservoirs, rivers and lakes.

The Medicine Hat News is the daily newspaper in Medicine Hat; other local weekly papers in the region include the Brooks Bulletin, Brooks and County Chronicle, Bassano Times, Hanna Herald, Bow Island Commentator, Oyen Echo, and Prairie Post.

Local television network CFCN-TV, which broadcasts in Calgary and Lethbridge, is the local CTV affiliate. It provides local television coverage, along with CBRT-DT Calgary (Calgary CBC) and CHAT-TV, a Citytv affiliate, in Medicine Hat. Medicine Hat radio stations include Power 93.7 (CJLT-FM), CHAT-FM, MY 96 (CFMY-FM), Classic Hits 102.1 (CJCY-FM) and Rock 105.3 (CKMH-FM). CKUA and CBC Radio 1 are rebroadcast from Calgary, and CHFA-8-FM (Radio Canada) is rebroadcast from Edmonton. Brooks' country radio station is Q13 (CIBQ).

== Government and politics ==
The municipalities within the Palliser Region are governed via a variety of systems. The City of Medicine Hat is governed by a city council consisting of a mayor and eight aldermen, each elected for a term of three years. The most recent elections were held in November 2010, when Normand Boucher was re-elected as mayor for a second term.

The City of Brooks is government by a city council consisting of a mayor and six councillors, also elected for a term of three years. The election of November 2010 returned Martin Shields as mayor for a second term.

The County of Forty Mile No. 8, the County of Newell, Cypress County and the Municipal District of Acadia are each represented by elected councils headed by a Reeve. The Special Areas are run by advisory councils consisting of eight members for Special Area 2, three members for Special Area 3 and three members for Special Area 4.

The towns of Bassano, Bow Island, Hanna, Oyen and Redcliff are each governed by their own mayor and town council. The villages of Cereal, Duchess, Empress, Foremost, Rosemary, Tilley and Youngstown are each governed by a village council.

The Palliser Region encompasses all or part of four provincial electoral districts, each of which elects a member to the Legislative Assembly of Alberta. The district of Cypress-Medicine Hat is represented by Leonard Mitzel, a member of the Alberta Progressive Conservative party. The district of Medicine Hat is represented by Progressive Conservative Rob Renner. The district of Strathmore-Brooks is represented by Progressive Conservative Arno Doerksen and the district of Drumheller-Stettler is represented by Progressive Conservative Jack Hayden.

At the federal level, the Palliser Region encompasses by two ridings, Medicine Hat and Lethbridge. The riding of Medicine Hat is represented by LaVar Payne of the Conservative Party. He was elected in the 2008 federal election, and is a member of the House of Commons Standing Committees on National Defence and Aboriginal Affairs and Northern Development. The riding of Crowfoot has been represented since 2000 by Conservative Kevin Sorenson. He is currently the chair of the Standing Committee on Foreign Affairs and International Development and Subcommittee on Agenda and Procedure of the Standing Committee on Foreign Affairs and International Development.
