= Alberta Highway 550 =

Highway in Alberta

Highway 550

Route information
- Maintained by Alberta Transportation
- Length: 39.5 km (24.5 mi)

Major junctions
- West end: Highway 1 (TCH) near Bassano
- Highway 36 near Duchess
- East end: Highway 873 in Duchess

Location
- Country: Canada
- Province: Alberta
- Specialized and rural municipalities: County of Newell
- Villages: Rosemary, Duchess

Highway system
- Alberta Numbered Highway Network; List; Former
| ← Highway 549 | → Highway 552 |

Alberta Provincial Highway No. 550, commonly referred to as Highway 550, is an east–west highway in southern Alberta, Canada. It is a two-lane undivided highway in the County of Newell runs from the Trans-Canada Highway (Highway 1), 5 km (3 mi) southeast of the Town of Bassano, through the Village of Rosemary, to Highway 873 in Duchess. Township Road 212 functions as a western extension of Highway 550 and connects to Bassano.

== History ==
Highway 550, along Highway 873 between Brooks and Duchess, was originally designated as part of Highway 2, which at the time was an east–west interprovincial highway that ran through Calgary and Medicine Hat (the present-day Highway 2 was designated as Highway 1). In 1941, Highway 2 was renumbered to Highway 1 to allow for contiguous numbering through Western Canada along the future Trans-Canada Highway, which was commissioned in 1949. In the mid-1950s, the Trans-Canada Highway was realigned between Brooks and Bassano, resulting in the Duchess-Bassano section being decommissioned and reverting to the County of Newell. When the Secondary Highway system was established in the mid 1970s, the route became Highway 550.

== Major intersections ==
From west to east: The entire route is in Newell County.

| Location | km | mi | Destinations | Notes |
|---|---|---|---|---|
| | 0.0 | 0.0 | Township Road 212 west – Bassano Highway 1 (TCH) – Calgary, Medicine Hat | Western terminus; continues as Township Road 212 |
| | 11.6 | 7.2 | Highway 862 north – Gem | |
| Rosemary | 25.1 | 15.6 | | |
| | 35.5 | 22.1 | Highway 36 – Hanna, Brooks | |
| Duchess | 39.5 | 24.5 | Highway 873 south / Range Road 144 north – Brooks | Eastern terminus |
1.000 mi = 1.609 km; 1.000 km = 0.621 mi
