= Millicent, Alberta =

Locality in Alberta, Canada

Millicent
- Settlement
- Location of Millicent in Alberta
- Coordinates: 50°42′37.08″N 111°46′41.88″W
- Country: Canada
- Province: Alberta
- Region: Southern Alberta
- Census division: Division No. 2, Alberta
- County: Newell County No. 4
- Railway siding established: 1914
- Time zone: UTC−7 (MST)
  - Summer (DST): UTC−6 (MDT)
- Postal code: T0J 2A0
- Area code(s): 403, 587, 825, and 368
- Roads: Range Road 135

Millicent is an unincorporated locality in southern Alberta within the County of Newell. It is located 15 kilometres (9 mi) northeast of Highway 1, 17 kilometres (11 mi) northeast of Brooks, and 50 kilometres (31 mi) east of Bassano.

== Toponymy ==
Millicent is named for Millicent Sutherland-Leveson-Gower, Duchess of Sutherland. At the time of the locality's naming, her husband Cromartie Sutherland-Leveson-Gower, 4th Duke of Sutherland, owned land in the now-city of Brooks nearby.

== Topography ==
Millicent is situated on a generally flat plain, with some gentle slopes. Soil in the area consists of silty clay loam, with some patches of salinity following years of irrigation.

== History ==
=== Pre-settlement ===
Prior to the founding of permanent settlements, the Brooks area was traditionally used as a bison hunting ground by Crow and Blackfoot groups. After the Crown and several Indigenous leaders signed Treaty 7 in 1877, the Government of Canada opened areas including Millicent up for settlement and dry farming.

Between 1900 and 1905, John Ware, a freedman and one of Alberta's first ranchers, kept a ranch and family home near Millicent.

=== Founding and decline: 1914–1949 ===
The permanent settlement of Millicent was established as a railway siding in 1914 by the Canadian Pacific Railway (CPR). As part of the Bassano Subdivision, Millicent enjoyed rail connections to localities with names also derived from nobility, including Duchess and Countess; the service was colloquially known as the Royal Line.

During World War I, Millicent gained residents from neighbouring Brooks, which was facing economic decline. Brooks' medical centre was moved to Millicent in 1916 and repurposed into a hardware store. Resident Edmond Francis Purcell opened a general store in Millicent around this time, followed by a post office in March 1916. In 1919 and 1920, Millicent's population expanded again with the arrival of farmers from Quebec and the western United States, as well as veterans of the war. Locals organized Millicent School District in 1920, though a school would not open until 1927, as the Ministry of Education debated whether one was necessary for the locale.

In 1921, Millicent received water from the CPR's Eastern Irrigation project, facilitated by the newly constructed Bassano Dam. In 1929, the CPR opened up land between Brooks and Millicent for farming. The area became known as 'Millicent Flats', and later the 'One Tree District'. Locally, these lands were also termed 'Poverty Flats' or 'Sucker Flats', owing to difficulties farmers faced in cultivating crops there, or growing adequate grass to feed cattle.

In the 1930s, Newell County was afflicted by the economic downturn wrought by the Dust Bowl and Great Depression. Farms around Bassano experienced "ten years of repeated [crop] failures", prompting many farmers to abandon their lands or default on mortgages. Newell localities subsequently began to depopulate. Nonetheless, in 1943, Millicent School hosted the first meeting of the John Ware Beef Club, today a chapter of the Alberta 4-H youth club and development program.

=== Rest of 20th century: 1950–2000 ===
Millicent received electricity around January 1951, as part of a rural electrification project executed by local farmers. The federal government approved Millicent's name for mapping purposes in 1955. Passenger rail services along the Royal Line were phased out over the rest of the decade.

The Millicent School shut down in 1960; its students were transferred to Duchess for education, and the building was repurposed into Millicent Community Hall. Canada Post similarly attempted to shut Millicent's post office in 1969 due to declining use, but protests by residents of the area postponed its closure. Millicent's post office would ultimately close in July 1988.

In 1984, preacher Ken Slamp opened Jesus Our Shepherd Church in Millicent, which he also advertised as a non-denominational Christian school. Slamp, who did not seek approval from the Ministry of Education, was charged with running an illegal school in 1985. At trial, Slamp argued that he was not the school's administrator: "I am an employee of Jesus Christ [and] I do believe He is the operator of the school". Brooks Provincial Court ruled that ordering Slamp to close the school would violate his Charter right to freedom of religion, though Slamp nonetheless closed the school to resume work as a Lutheran pastor.

The CPR discontinued rail services along the Royal Line in December 1997.

=== 21st century: 2001–present ===
Millicent Community Hall remained in use as an events centre until the early 2010s, when it was shut down; the building was demolished in 2016. As of 2017, little remains of the original Millicent. As described by postal historian Dale Speirs, the toponym is retained by "a loose collection of acreages" in the vicinity of the earlier site.

In August 2025, a hailstorm and tornado that struck Newell County damaged 34 AltaLink electrical transmission towers, with the worst of the damage concentrated in Millicent.

== Places of interest ==
Millicent lies beside the 800-acre Millicent Conservation Site, which contains a provincially designated pheasant release zone.

== Notable residents ==
- John Ware – influential early rancher in Alberta; lived and ranched in the Millicent area between 1900 and 1905.
- Roy Berg – University of Alberta professor and animal geneticist; born and raised in Millicent. Berg's research in the 1960s led to the development of hybrid cattle breeding programs that increased Alberta's beef production by up to 40 per cent. As of 2026, the research facility he developed remains in use by the University of Alberta, operating as the Roy Berg Kinsella Research Ranch.
