= Bantry (disambiguation) =

Bantry is a town in County Cork, Ireland.

Bantry may also refer to:

- Bantry (County Cork barony), an Irish barony centred on the town of Bantry
- Bantry (County Wexford barony), an Irish barony in County Wexford
- Bantry, North Dakota, a city in the United States
- Bantry, Alberta, a locality in Canada
- Earl of Bantry, (previously Baron Bantry and Viscount Bantry) 1800–1891 titles in the Peerage of Ireland

== See also ==
- Bantry Bay (disambiguation)
