= Bow City, Alberta =

Bow City, Alberta may refer to:

- Bow City, Alberta (former village), a former village within Vulcan County in southern Alberta, Canada
- Bow City, Alberta (hamlet), a hamlet within the County of Newell in southern Alberta, Canada
