= Countess, Alberta =

Countess
- Settlement
- Location of Countess in Alberta
- Coordinates: 50°42′37.08″N 111°46′44.04″W
- Country: Canada
- Province: Alberta
- Region: Southern Alberta
- Census division: Division No. 2, Alberta
- County: Newell County No. 4
- Time zone: UTC−7 (MST)
  - Summer (DST): UTC−6 (MDT)
- Highways: Alberta Highway 550

Countess is a locality in the County of Newell, Alberta, Canada. It lies 139 km south-east of Calgary.

== Toponymy ==
Countess is named for philanthropist and aristocrat Marie Anne Claire Symes, popularly known as Countess Bassano. She was the wife of French aristocrat and Canadian Pacific Railway investor, Napoléon Hugues Charles Marie Ghislain Maret de Bassano, Duke of Bassano.

== History ==
=== Pre-settlement ===
As part of the County of Newell, Countess is within the Blackfoot nations' traditional territories. Artefacts found in the area indicate the presence of Indigenous peoples from as early as 3200 BCE.

=== Founding and early growth: 1914–1929 ===
As a permanent settlement, Countess was founded in 1914, when the Canadian Pacific Railway (CPR) established a railway station by that name to serve surrounding grain farms. Countess and nearby station Bassano were named in honour of the third duke of Bassano, a CPR shareholder, and his wife. The line connecting Bassano to Countess also served localities with similarly regal names, including Empress and Monarch; it was therefore known colloquially as the Royal Line.

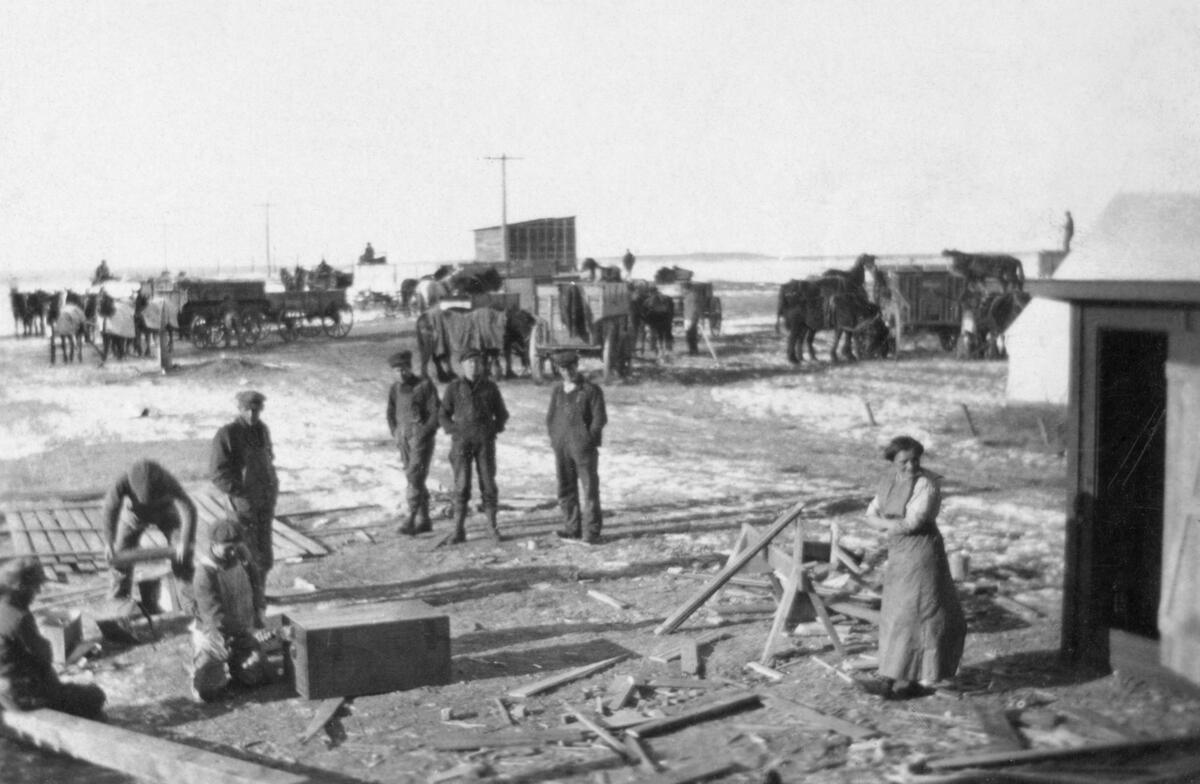
Grain elevator under construction in Countess (1914).

Early residents of the Countess area were attracted by promotions of affordable farmland, particularly after the conclusion of the First World War. Plots were predominantly sold by the CPR. Emigrants from New England and Quebec were well-represented among their early buyers; towards the end of the 1920s, several Russian Mennonite families fleeing Eastern Europe also settled in Countess. Few of Countess' early arrivals were experienced farmers, and no formal training was available.

Nonetheless, the Countess area enjoyed strong yields of crops including barley, rye, and grain from its founding into the early 1920s. Grain merchants Terwilliger and Wolfe opened a Countess grain elevator in 1916, and Alberta Government Telephones expanded into Countess the following year. By 1927, Countess had expanded to host a post office, general store, grain elevator, community hall, and a one-room school.

=== Decline: 1930–1959 ===
Countess' period of rapid early development in the 1910s and 1920s was followed by equally rapid decline in the 1930s. Newell County region was afflicted by the Dust Bowl and Great Depression throughout the decade, and many farmers who could no longer afford their mortgages abandoned their lands. Local newspaper, the Bassano Recorder, described the outlook of farmers in the greater Bassano district in a June 1939 article: "Everyone is putting off any unnecessary purchases until the crop now in the field is materialized. After ten years of repeated failures, it is hard for anyone to become over enthused." A small passenger train connecting Countess to Calgary ended operations early in the decade. Only Countess' proximity to a provincial highway allowed its general store to expand into a filling station in the mid-1930s.

Until midway through the Second World War, Countess maintained baseball and hockey teams made up of locals who played against teams from surrounding settlements, including Lathom and Bassano. Men and women from Countess were subsequently among the residents of the Newell County area who enlisted in Canada's war effort. In April 1945, a report in the Bassano Recorder attributed sales of war bonds totalling $6,400 to 50 applicants in the Countess area.

By February 1948, according to a resident writing to the Calgary Herald, the original Countess site contained three residential properties, of which one stood empty; the school was no longer operational. Countess' community hall closed the next year. The 1950s introduction of the Trans-Canada Highway, which bypassed Countess, ended the locality's utility as a service stop for motorists, and passenger railway services to Countess also ended that decade.

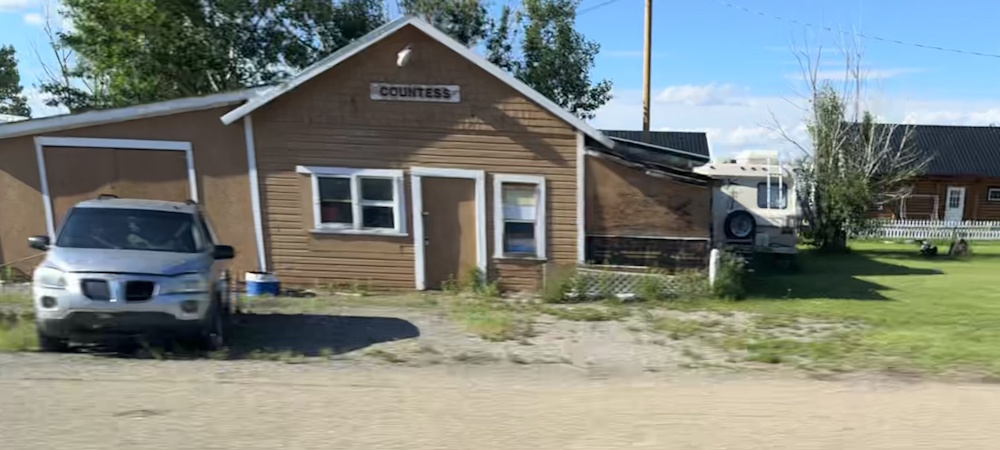
View of Countess and Countess Country Museum from Alberta Highway 550 (2026).

=== Recent developments: 1960–present ===
Oil and gas were discovered near Countess in the mid-1960s. After sustaining severe fire damage in August 1968, the Countess post office closed permanently in April 1969.

By the early 1990s, Countess as a toponym was primarily used by cattle ranches operating in the original site's vicinity. In 1995, the CPR found that fewer than 10 loaded freight cars per mile utilized the Empress–Bassano CPR line running through Countess. The CPR tried and ultimately failed to find a private buyer; the line closed in December 1997.

In 2012, a community museum named the Countess Country Museum was established on the original Countess site. Several farms operate in the Countess area as of 2025.

== Services and amenities ==
=== Services ===
As of 2026, Countess receives medical services including home care arrangements through Brooks Health Centre. Countess is one of the communities monitored by the crime prevention non-profit, the South East Alberta Rural Crime Watch Association.

=== Amenities ===
The Countess Country Museum remains open as of 2024. It hosts a decommissioned CPR caboose originally constructed at the CPR Angus Shops.

=== Media ===
The Brooks Bulletin, a weekly newspaper based in Brooks, reports on news local to Countess in its "Bassano Banner" column.

== Countess oil field ==
In November 1965, energy prospectors conducting exploratory drills around Countess discovered a 10,500-acre oil field with associated natural gas. By 1989, the Countess oil field contained at least 60 active wells. Central-Del Rio Oils Limited (now PanCanadian Petroleum) was among the earliest petroleum companies to drill at the site; companies that have operated in Countess in subsequent decades include Journey Energy, Star Valley Drilling, and Sonoro Energy.

In 2020, Journey Energy established a 4-megawatt gas-fired power plant fuelled by the Countess field. A private third party bought the facility in June 2026. Since 2024, gas storage service provider Rockpoint has maintained a facility near Countess.
