= Gem, Alberta =

Gem
- Hamlet
- Location of Gem Gem (Canada)
- Coordinates: 50°57′02″N 112°11′20″W
- Country: Canada
- Province: Alberta
- Region: Southern Alberta
- Census division: 2
- Municipal district: County of Newell

Government
  - Type: Unincorporated
  - Governing body: County of Newell Council

Population (2020)
  - Total: 29
- Time zone: UTC−06:00 (Alberta Time)
- Area codes: 403, 587, 825

Gem is a hamlet in southern Alberta, Canada within the County of Newell. It is located approximately 29 kilometres (18 mi) north of Highway 1 and 66 kilometres (41 mi) northwest of Brooks.

== Toponymy ==
Gem was named by local residents, who believed the name reflected the land's agricultural potential.

== Environment ==
Gem lies upon a buried preglacial valley, now filled in with sand and gravel. Populations of semipalmated sandpipers, northern pintails, and gadwalls live around Gem.

== History ==
=== Founding: 1900–1920 ===
Gem received its first settlers in the early 20th century, most of whom were farmers from Colorado responding to advertisements by the Eastern Irrigation District corporation. Shortly after their arrival, Gem's farmers became among the first to benefit from water provided through the corporation's irrigation measures.

A post office operating under the name Gem opened in August 1914, and a cemetery opened for the settlement around the same time. Gem's expansion further benefited from 1915 producing one of the most successful wheat yields in Alberta's history. Gem School opened in 1919.

=== Development: 1921–1989 ===
Gem received railway services in 1927, connecting the hamlet to nearby settlements including Scandia and Rainier. In November 1928, 25 Mennonite families from Ukraine and Russia settled in Gem. The Mennonite community built a church in 1932, and opened Bethesda Bible School in November 1933. A section for Mennonites was introduced to Gem Cemetery shortly after their arrival.

In the 1950s Gem's Mennonite congregation began to transition from worshipping in Plautdietsch to English. A new Mennonite church was built in 1952, as the previous building had reached a state of disrepair. Gem's Bethesda Bible School ceased operations in 1957.

A Lehrerleut Hutterite colony, Spring View, was founded in Gem in 1979.

=== Recent developments: 1990–present ===
Gem's post office closed permanently in 1992. On May 23, 2004, Gem's Mennonite community celebrated its 75th anniversary.

== Amenities and services ==
As of 2026, Gem contains an active Mennonite Brethren Church, community hall, and school. The school announced a kindergarten]program in early 2026. A public library also operates in the hamlet. Recycling services are provided by the Newell Recycling Association.

Gem Cemetery, maintained by the Alberta Genealogical Society, is open to the public.

== Transport ==
Newell County provides a minibus service that transports residents of Gem to Brooks for appointments, shopping, or social events. This service operates every Wednesday as of 2026.

== Climate ==
Climate data for Gem, Alberta
Month	Jan	Feb	Mar	Apr	May	Jun	Jul	Aug	Sep	Oct	Nov	Dec	Year
Record high °C (°F)	15.5 (59.9)	21.0 (69.8)	27.0 (80.6)	27.5 (81.5)	31.5 (88.7)	36.6 (97.9)	37.5 (99.5)	37.0 (98.6)	34.5 (94.1)	29.0 (84.2)	21.0 (69.8)	15.5 (59.9)	37.5 (99.5)
Mean daily maximum °C (°F)	−5.5 (22.1)	−1.4 (29.5)	4.7 (40.5)	13.1 (55.6)	18.6 (65.5)	22.1 (71.8)	26.2 (79.2)	25.6 (78.1)	20.1 (68.2)	12.6 (54.7)	2.6 (36.7)	−3.0 (26.6)	11.3 (52.3)
Daily mean °C (°F)	−11.2 (11.8)	−7.4 (18.7)	−1.5 (29.3)	5.8 (42.4)	11.1 (52.0)	15.3 (59.5)	18.5 (65.3)	17.6 (63.7)	12.3 (54.1)	5.5 (41.9)	−3.2 (26.2)	−8.7 (16.3)	4.5 (40.1)
Mean daily minimum °C (°F)	−16.9 (1.6)	−13.3 (8.1)	−7.8 (18.0)	−1.6 (29.1)	3.6 (38.5)	8.4 (47.1)	10.7 (51.3)	9.6 (49.3)	4.5 (40.1)	−1.7 (28.9)	−9 (16)	−14.4 (6.1)	−2.3 (27.9)
Record low °C (°F)	−43.5 (−46.3)	−41.5 (−42.7)	−34.5 (−30.1)	−17.0 (1.4)	−10 (14)	−0.5 (31.1)	2.5 (36.5)	−2.0 (28.4)	−7.0 (19.4)	−25.5 (−13.9)	−34.0 (−29.2)	−43.0 (−45.4)	−43.5 (−46.3)
Average precipitation mm (inches)	11.4 (0.45)	8.9 (0.35)	13.8 (0.54)	22.1 (0.87)	42.8 (1.69)	68.0 (2.68)	34.4 (1.35)	41.8 (1.65)	25.3 (1.00)	13.0 (0.51)	13.0 (0.51)	9.5 (0.37)	303.9 (11.96)
Average rainfall mm (inches)	0.7 (0.03)	0.1 (0.00)	2.6 (0.10)	18.6 (0.73)	39.9 (1.57)	68.0 (2.68)	34.4 (1.35)	41.8 (1.65)	24.7 (0.97)	10.8 (0.43)	1.6 (0.06)	0.3 (0.01)	243.6 (9.59)
Average snowfall cm (inches)	10.6 (4.2)	8.8 (3.5)	11.2 (4.4)	3.5 (1.4)	2.8 (1.1)	0.0 (0.0)	0.0 (0.0)	0.0 (0.0)	0.6 (0.2)	2.2 (0.9)	11.4 (4.5)	9.2 (3.6)	60.3 (23.7)
Source: Environment Canada

== Demographics ==
The population of Gem according to the 2020 municipal census conducted by the County of Newell is 29.

== Notable people ==
- Arno Doerksen – member of the Alberta Legislature for the Strathmore-Brooks district from 2008 to 2012, raised in Gem

== See also ==
- List of communities in Alberta
- List of hamlets in Alberta
