= Bow City crater =

- Location within Canada Location within Alberta
- Location: Western Canadian Sedimentary Basin, Bow City, Alberta, Alberta, Canada; 50°26′N 112°24′W

Impact crater structure
- Confidence: Potential
- Diameter: ~8 kilometers (5.0 mi)
- Age: ~73 Ma; Late Cretaceous
- Exposed: No

The Bow City crater is a potential meteorite impact crater located in southern Alberta, Canada, northwest of Bow City.

Wei Xie of the University of Alberta discovrted the 8-km-wide (5-mile-wide) crater in 2012. The crater is estimated to have formed approximately 70 million years ago. It is not directly visible from the surface, as it is buried under approximately a kilometre of overburden. Petrochemical seismic studies provided the first clues to its existence.
