= Crawling Valley Reservoir =

Lake in Alberta, Canada

- Location within Alberta
- Location: County of Newell, Alberta
- Coordinates: 50°54′07″N 112°21′10″W
- Basin countries: Canada
- Max. length: 12 km (7.5 mi)
- Max. width: 7.2 km (4.5 mi)
- Surface area: 25.1 km^{2} (9.7 sq mi)
- Average depth: 5.2 m (17 ft)
- Max. depth: 16 m (52 ft)
- Surface elevation: 778 m (2,552 ft)
- Settlements: Bassano
- References: Crawling Valley Reservoir

Crawling Valley Reservoir, or Barkenhouse Lake, is a reservoir in Alberta. The reservoir uses the existing Crawling Valley, which was a meltwater channel created at the end of the last ice age during the letting of the Laurentide ice sheet. Construction of dams and canals began in 1983, diverting some water from the Bow River via the North Branch Canal, starting just upstream of the Bassano Dam (southwest of the town of Bassano), to fill the reservoir. The main drainage from the Crawling Valley Reservoir flows through a continuation of the North Branch Canal, serving irrigation needs, with other outflow into the Matzhiwin Creek.

== See also ==
- List of lakes of Alberta
