= Sandia =

Sandia may refer to:

== Places ==
- Sandia, Texas, town in the USA
- Sandia, Peru, town in the Puno region of Peru, capital of
  - Sandia Province, province in the Puno region
- Sandia Mountains, a mountain range near Albuquerque in New Mexico, USA, which gave their name to
  - Sandia Heights, New Mexico
  - Pueblo of Sandia Village, New Mexico, U.S. census-designated location
  - Sandia Mountain Wilderness, in New Mexico, USA
  - Sandia High School, high school in Albuquerque, New Mexico
  - Sandia Motorsport Park, racing venue in Albuquerque, New Mexico
  - Sandia Preparatory School, in Albuquerque, New Mexico
  - Sandia View Academy, in Corrales, New Mexico
  - Sandia Base, nuclear weapons base
  - Sandia National Laboratories, a major United States Department of Energy research and development national laboratory
    - Sandia Corporation, a wholly owned subsidiary of Lockheed Martin Corporation, which formerly managed and operated the Sandia National Laboratories
  - Sandia Peak Tramway, tram way in New Mexico
  - Sandia Pueblo, a Native American tribe
    - Sandia Casino

== Other ==
- Sandia (butterfly) Ehrlich & Clench 1960, a genus of butterfly
- Invalid genus names preoccupied by the butterflies:
  - Sandia Sutherland & Harlow 1973, brachiopods
  - Sandia Theron 1982, Hemiptera (true bugs)
- Sandia hairstreak (Callophrys mcfarlandi), a species of butterfly

== See also ==
- Scandia (disambiguation)
