= Lake Newell Resort =

- Hamlet
- Location of Lake Newell Resort Lake Newell Resort (Canada)
- Coordinates: 50°30′01″N 111°55′31″W
- Country: Canada
- Province: Alberta
- Region: Southern Alberta
- Census division: 2
- Municipal district: County of Newell

Government
  - Type: Unincorporated
  - Governing body: County of Newell Council

Area (2021)
  - Land: 2.82 km^{2} (1.09 sq mi)

Population (2021)
  - Total: 457
  - Density: 162.2/km^{2} (420/sq mi)
- Time zone: UTC−06:00 (Alberta Time)
- Area codes: 403, 587, 825

Lake Newell Resort is a hamlet in southern Alberta, Canada within the County of Newell that was established in 2007.

The hamlet is located on northern shore of the Lake Newell Reservoir approximately 5.0 kilometres (3.1 mi) south of Brooks and 3.2 kilometres (2.0 mi) west of Highway 873. It is accessed from Highway 873 via Township Road 182 to Lake Newell Resort Road.

== Demographics ==
Population history of Lake Newell Resort
Year	Pop.	±%
2016	407	—
2021	457	+12.3%
Source: Statistics Canada

In the 2021 Census of Population conducted by Statistics Canada, Lake Newell Resort had a population of 457 living in 164 of its 202 total private dwellings, a change of 12.3% from its 2016 population of 407. With a land area of 2.82 km^{2} (1.09 sq mi), it had a population density of 162.1/km^{2} (419.7/sq mi) in 2021.

The population of Lake Newell Resort according to the 2020 municipal census conducted by the County of Newell is 437.

== See also ==
- List of communities in Alberta
- List of hamlets in Alberta
