= Scandia (disambiguation) =

Scandia or Scandza is an early name used for the Scandinavian Peninsula by the first cartographers charting northern Europe.

Scandia may also refer to:

== Places ==
- Scandia, Alberta, a hamlet in southern Alberta, Canada
- Scandia Eastern Irrigation District Museum, an open-air museum in eastern Alberta
- Scandia, Kansas, a city in the United States
- Scandia, Minnesota, a city in the United States
- Scandia Township, Polk County, Minnesota, a township in the United States
- Scandia Trail, Minnesota State Highway 97
- Scandia Valley Township, Morrison County, Minnesota, a township in the United States
- Scandia, Solano County, California

== Science ==
- An alternate name for scandium oxide, Sc_{2}O_{3}
- Scandia (cnidarian), a genus of hydrozoans in the family Hebellidae
- Scandia (plant), a genus of plants in the family Apiaceae
- Scandia Tholi, a mountain on Mars (a classical albedo feature)

== Media ==
- Scandia (journal), a Scandinavian history periodical

== Business ==
- ABB Scandia, a locomotive builder from Denmark
- Saab 90 Scandia, a 1940s Swedish airliner
- Team Scandia, a defunct Indy Racing League team
- Scandia Amusements, a chain of small scale amusement parks in California

== See also ==
- Scania (disambiguation)
- Scandiano
- Skandia (disambiguation)
