= Hugues-Bernard Maret, duc de Bassano =

French statesman and diplomat

Hugues-Bernard Maret Duke of Bassano
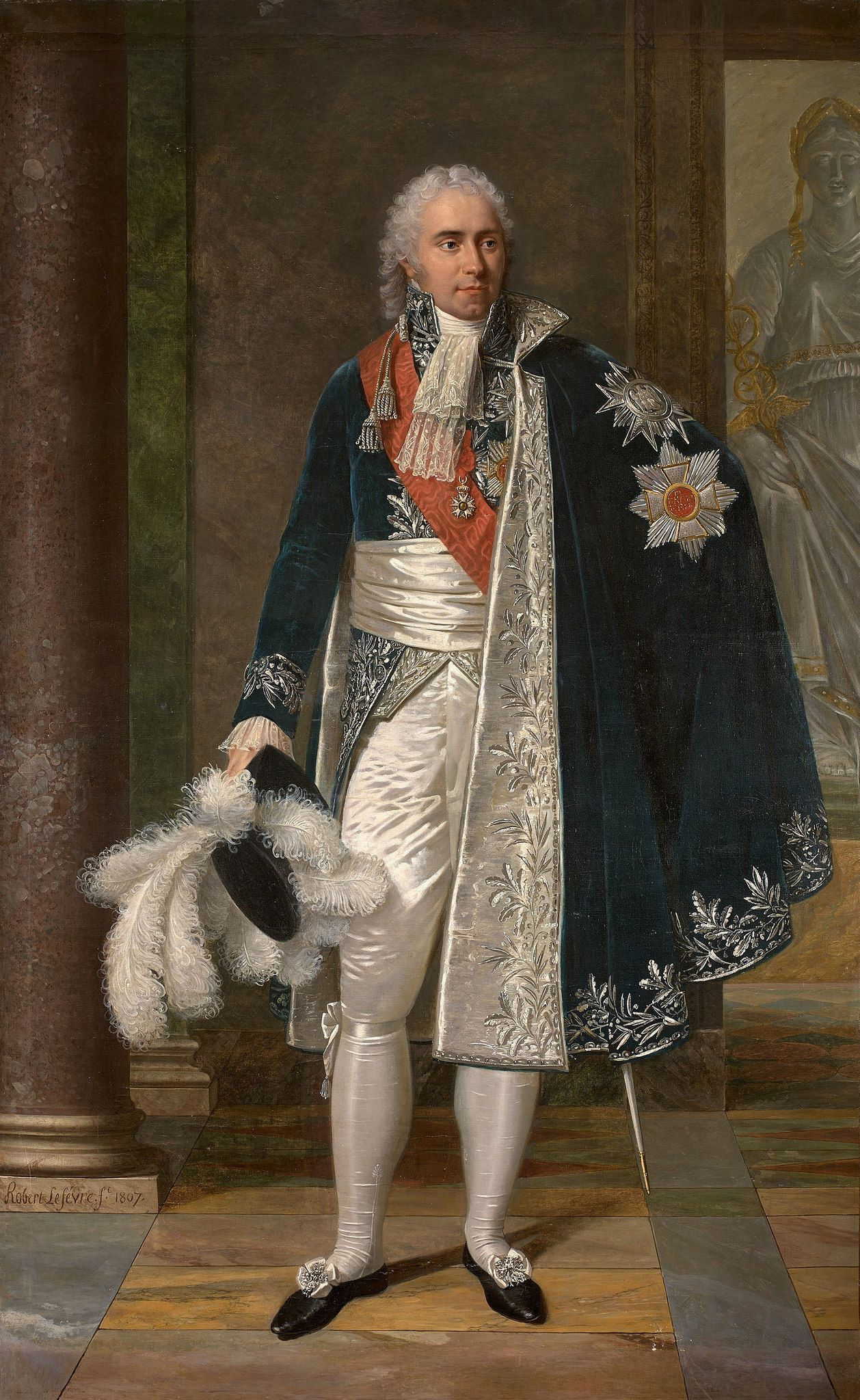
- Portrait by Robert Lefèvre, 1807

Minister of Foreign Affairs
- In office 17 April 1811 – 19 November 1813
- Monarch: Napoleon
- Preceded by: Jean-Baptiste de Nompère de Champagny
- Succeeded by: Armand de Caulaincourt

Prime Minister of France
- In office 10 November 1834 – 18 November 1834
- Monarch: Louis Philippe I
- Preceded by: Étienne Maurice Gérard
- Succeeded by: Édouard Mortier

Personal details
- Born: 1 May 1763 Dijon
- Died: 13 May 1839 (aged 76) Paris
- Resting place: Père Lachaise Cemetery
- Awards: Grand Eagle of the Legion of Honour; Grand Cross of the House Order of Fidelity; Grand Cross of the Order of Saint Hubert; Grand Cross of the Order of the Crown of Saxony; Order of the Lion and the Sun
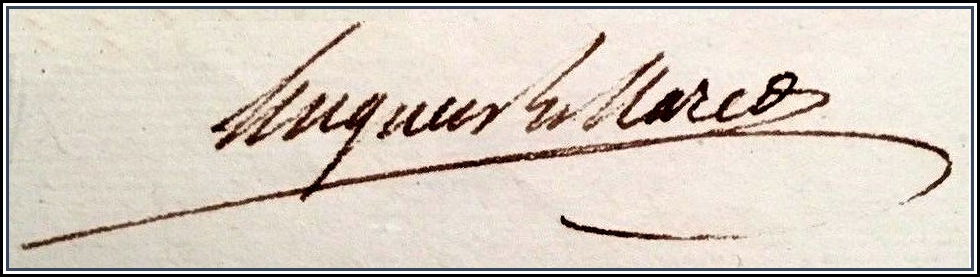
- Signature

Hugues-Bernard Maret (French: [yɡ bɛʁnaʁ maʁɛ]; 1 May 1763 – 13 May 1839), 1st Duke of Bassano (Duc de Bassano), was a French statesman, diplomat and journalist.

== Biography ==
=== Early career ===
Maret was born in Dijon, in the province of Burgundy, as the second son of a physician and scholar at the Academy of Dijon. Destined for a medical career by his father, he instead decided to study law, and after receiving a solid education Maret entered the legal profession, becoming a lawyer at the King's Council in Paris. The ideas of the French Revolution profoundly influenced him, wholly altering his career.

The interest aroused by the debates of the first National Assembly suggested to him the idea of publishing them in the Bulletin de l'Assemblée. The journalist Charles-Joseph Panckoucke (1736–1798), owner of the Mercure de France and publisher of the famous Encyclopédie (1785), persuaded him to merge this in a larger paper, Le Moniteur Universel, which gained a wide repute for correctness and impartiality.

He was a member of the moderate club, the Feuillants, but, with the overthrow of the monarchy and the insurrection of 10 August 1792 he accepted a post in the Ministry of Foreign Affairs, where he sometimes exercised a steadying influence. On the withdrawal of the British legation, Citizen Maret (as he was then known) went on a mission to London, where he had a favourable interview with William Pitt the Younger on 22 December 1792 – all hope of an accommodation was, however, in vain. After the execution of Bourbon King Louis XVI (21 January 1793), the chief French diplomatic agent, Bernard-François de Chauvelin, was ordered to leave Britain, while the National Convention declared war (1 February 1793 – see Campaigns of 1793 in the French Revolutionary Wars). These events limited the impact of Maret's second mission to London in January 1794.

=== Envoy of the Republic ===
After a space in which he held no diplomatic post, he became Ambassador of the French Republic to the Kingdom of Naples; but, while negotiating with Charles de Sémonville he was captured by the Austrian Empire and was kept for some thirty months, until, at the close of 1795, the two were set free in return for the liberation of Princess Marie-Thérèse-Charlotte, the daughter of ex-King Louis XVI.

For a time Maret returned to journalism, but he played a useful part in the negotiations for a peace with Britain which went on at Lille during the summer of 1797, until the victory of the Jacobin Club in Paris in the coup d'état of 18 Fructidor (September 1797) frustrated the hopes of Pitt for peace and inflicted on Maret another reverse of fortune.

On Napoleon's return from Egypt in 1799, Maret joined the general's party which came to power with the 18 Brumaire coup (9 November–10).

=== Consulate and Empire ===
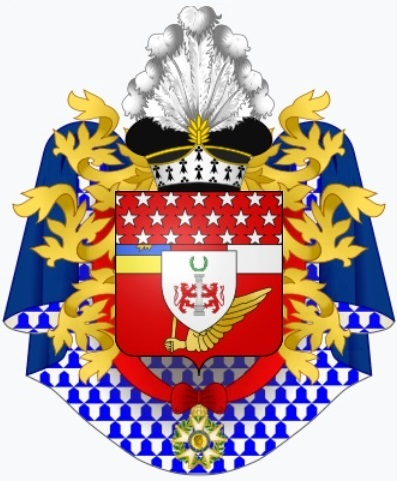
Heraldic achievement of Hugues-Bernard Maret, Duke of Bassano

Maret now became one of Napoleon's secretaries and shortly afterwards Secretary of State. An experienced politician, he rendered services of major value to the French Consulate and First French Empire.

The Moniteur, which became the official State Journal in 1800, was placed under his control. He sometimes succeeded in toning down the hard, abrupt language of Napoleon's communications, and in every way proved a useful intermediary. It is known that he had a share in the drawing up of the new constitutions for the Batavian and Italian Republics.

In 1804, he became Minister; in 1807, he was created Count; and in 1809, he was granted the title of Duc de Bassano, one of the titles with the status of duché grand-fief in Napoleon's Kingdom of Italy. This was a rare hereditary honor (extinct in 1906), which gives an insight into how well respected his work was by the Emperor.

He was extremely devoted to Napoleon, as shown by his work to pass into law the artifices adopted by the latter in April–May 1808 in order to make himself master of the destinies of Spain (see Peninsular War). Maret also assisted in drawing up the Spanish Constitution of 1808, which was rejected by almost all Spanish subjects. He accompanied Napoleon through most of his campaigns, including that of 1809 against the Fifth Coalition, and he expressed himself in favour of the marriage alliance with the Archduchess Marie-Louise of Austria, which took place in 1810.

In the spring of 1811, the Duc de Bassano replaced Jean-Baptiste de Champagny, as Minister of Foreign Affairs. In this capacity he showed his usual ability and devotion, concluding the treaties between France and Austria and between France and Prussia, which preceded the French invasion of Russia in 1812. He was with Napoleon through the greater part of that campaign, and after the major defeat, helped to prepare the new forces with which Napoleon waged the equally unsuccessful campaign of 1813 against the Sixth Coalition.

=== End of the Empire, exile, and return ===
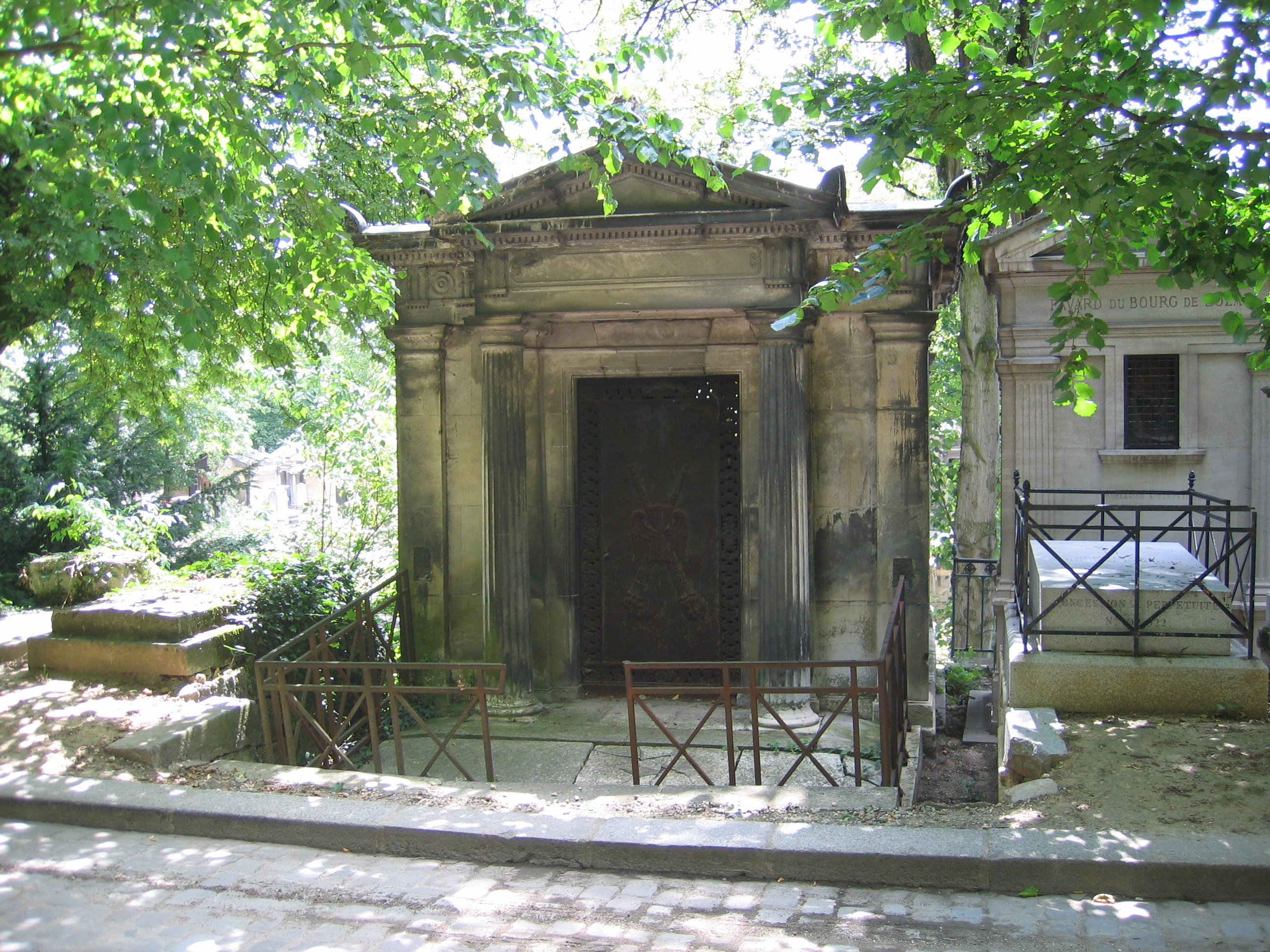
Maret's tomb in Paris

In November 1813 Napoleon replaced Maret with Armand, Marquis of Caulaincourt, who was known to be devoted to the cause of peace and had a personal connection to Tsar Alexander I of Russia. Maret, however, as private secretary of Napoleon, remained with him through the campaign of 1814, as well as during that of 1815 and the Hundred Days.

After the restoration of the Bourbons, Maret was exiled. He retired to Graz, where he occupied himself with literary work. In 1820 he was allowed to return to France. After the July Revolution of 1830, the new king Louis Philippe elevated him as a Peer of France. In November 1834 Maret served a short time as Prime Minister of France.

The Duc de Bassano died in Paris on 13 May 1839 aged at 76.

== See also ==
- List of Ambassadors of France to the United Kingdom

Political offices
Preceded by Comte Gérard	Prime Minister of France; 1834	Succeeded by Duc de Treviso
French nobility
Preceded by New creation	Duke of Bassano; 1809–1839	Succeeded by Napoléon Hugues Maret de Bassano
