= 2020 Alberta municipal censuses =

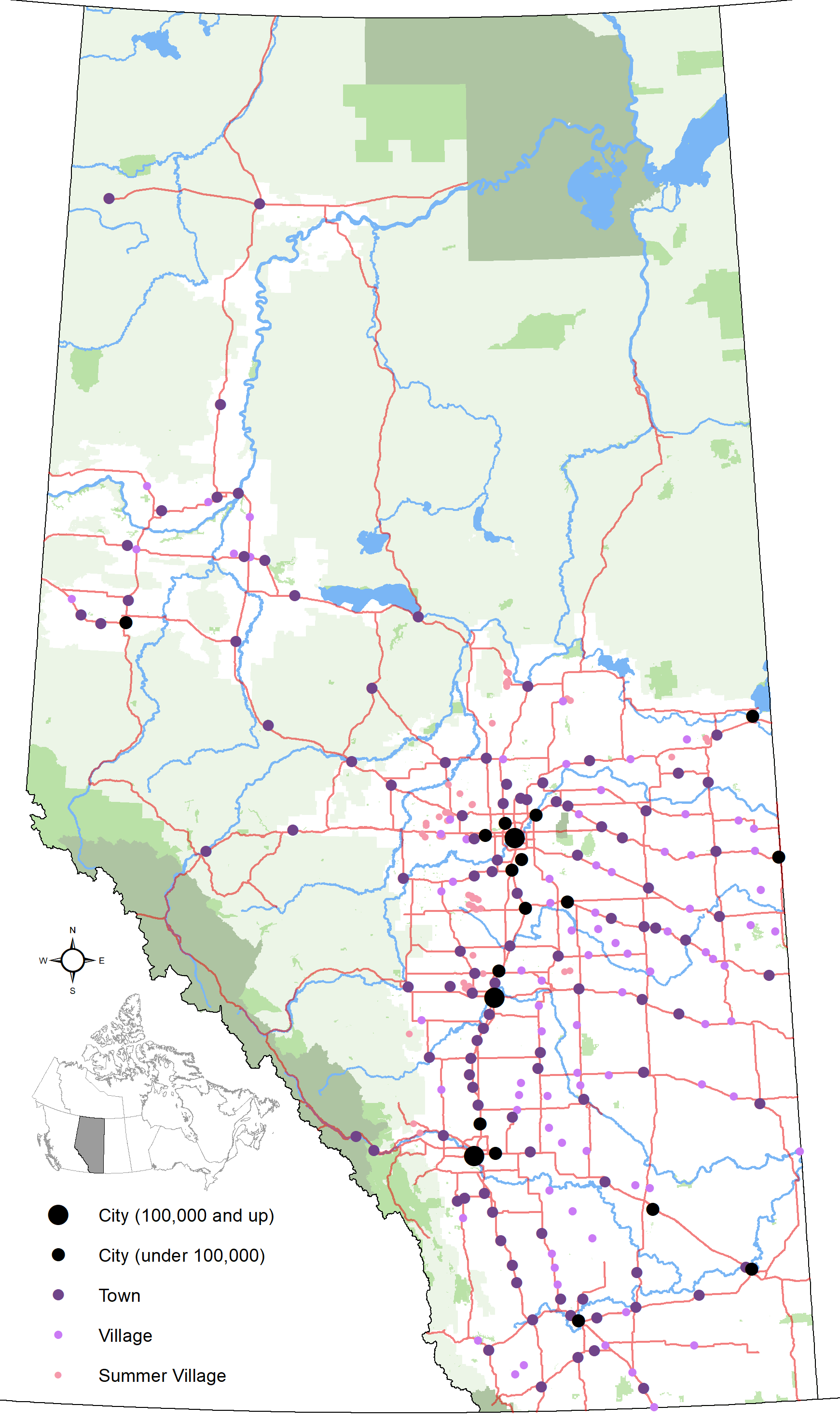
- Distribution of Alberta's 260 urban municipalities

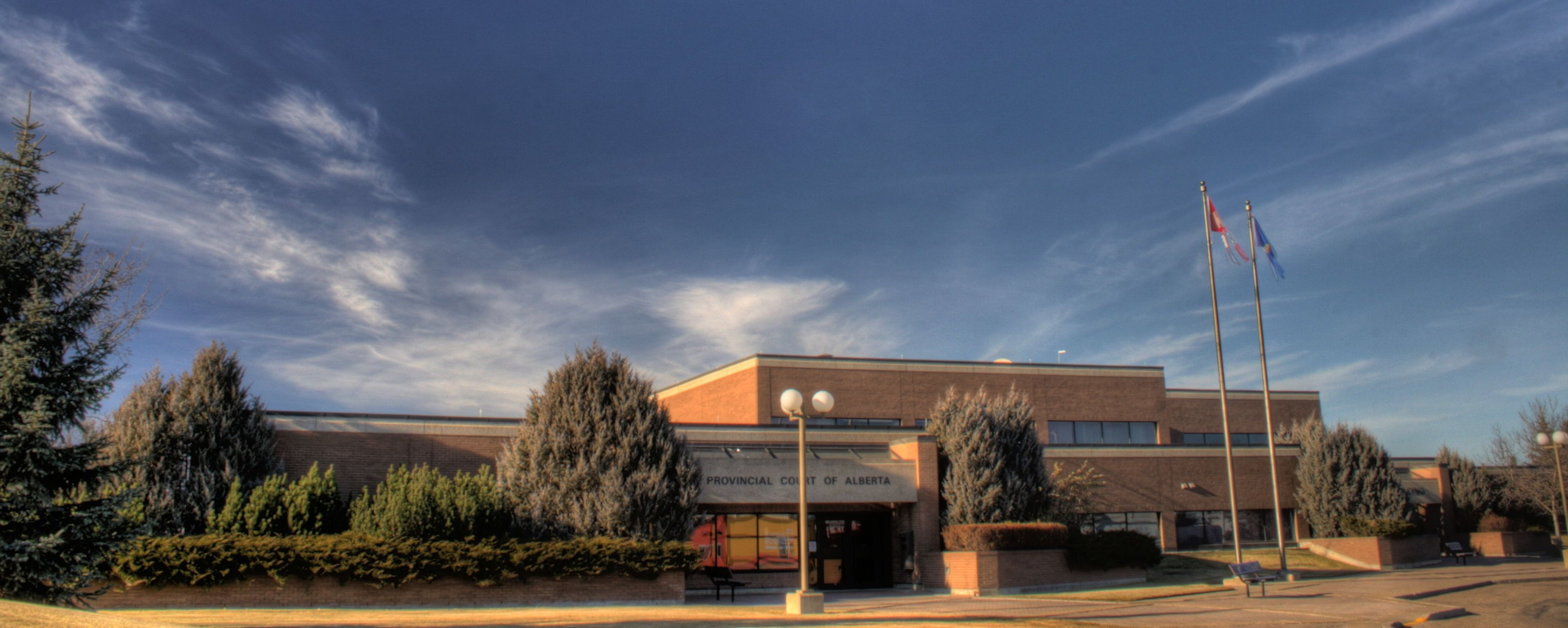
Morinville surpassed a population of 10,000 in 2020, making it the tenth town in Alberta eligible for city status.

Alberta has provincial legislation allowing its municipalities to conduct municipal censuses. Municipalities choose to conduct their own censuses for multiple reasons such as to better inform municipal service planning and provision, to capitalize on per capita based grant funding from higher levels of government, or to simply update their populations since the last federal census.

Alberta began the year of 2020 with 351 municipalities, which decreased to 349 on February 1 with the dissolutions of the Town of Granum and the Village of Gadsby. Of these, at least 13 (3.7%) published their intentions to conduct a municipal census in 2020. However, 10 of these municipalities cancelled their intentions.

Morinville was the lone municipality to achieve a population milestone as a result of its 2020 municipal census. It surpassed the 10,000-mark making it eligible for city status.

== Cancelled municipal censuses ==
The following 10 municipalities intended to conduct a municipal census in 2020 but did not follow through.

- Airdrie
- Banff
- Calgary
- Camrose
- Lethbridge
- Raymond
- Red Deer
- Strathcona County
- Municipal District of Taber
- Regional Municipality of Wood Buffalo

== Municipal census results ==
The following summarizes the results of the numerous municipal censuses conducted in 2020.

| 2020 municipal census summary | | | | 2016 federal census comparison | | | | Previous municipal census comparison | | | |
| Municipality | Status | Census date | 2020 pop. | 2016 pop. | Absolute growth | Absolute change | Annual growth rate | Prev. pop. | Prev. census year | Absolute growth | Annual growth rate |
|---|---|---|---|---|---|---|---|---|---|---|---|
| Morinville | Town | April 1, 2020 | 10,578 | 9,848 | 730 | 7.4% | 1.8% | 9,893 | 2016 | 685 | 1.7% |
| County of Newell | Municipal district | | 7,502 | 7,548 | −22 | -0.3% | −0.1% | | | | |
| Taber | Town | October 1, 2020 | 8,711 | 8,424 | 287 | 3.4% | 0.8% | 8,380 | 2015 | 331 | 0.8% |

== Breakdowns ==
=== Hamlets ===
The following is a list of hamlet populations determined by the 2020 municipal census conducted by the County of Newell.

| 2020 municipal census summary | | | Previous census comparison | | | |
| Hamlet | Municipality | 2020 population | Previous population | Previous census year | Absolute growth | Annual growth rate |
|---|---|---|---|---|---|---|
| Bow City | County of Newell | 16 | | 2009 | | |
| Cassils | County of Newell | 22 | 43 | 1991 | −21 | −2.3% |
| Gem | County of Newell | 29 | 17 | 2009 | −12 | 5.0% |
| Lake Newell Resort | County of Newell | 437 | 341 | 2009 | 96 | 2.3% |
| Patricia | County of Newell | 88 | 101 | 2009 | −13 | −1.2% |
| Rainier | County of Newell | 22 | 20 | 2009 | 2 | 0.9% |
| Rolling Hills | County of Newell | 263 | 258 | 2009 | 5 | 0.2% |
| Scandia | County of Newell | 169 | 146 | 2009 | 23 | 1.3% |
| Tilley | County of Newell | 335 | 405 | 2007 | −70 | −1.7% |

== See also ==
- List of communities in Alberta
