= Palliser's Triangle =

Geographic region in southern Alberta and Saskatchewan

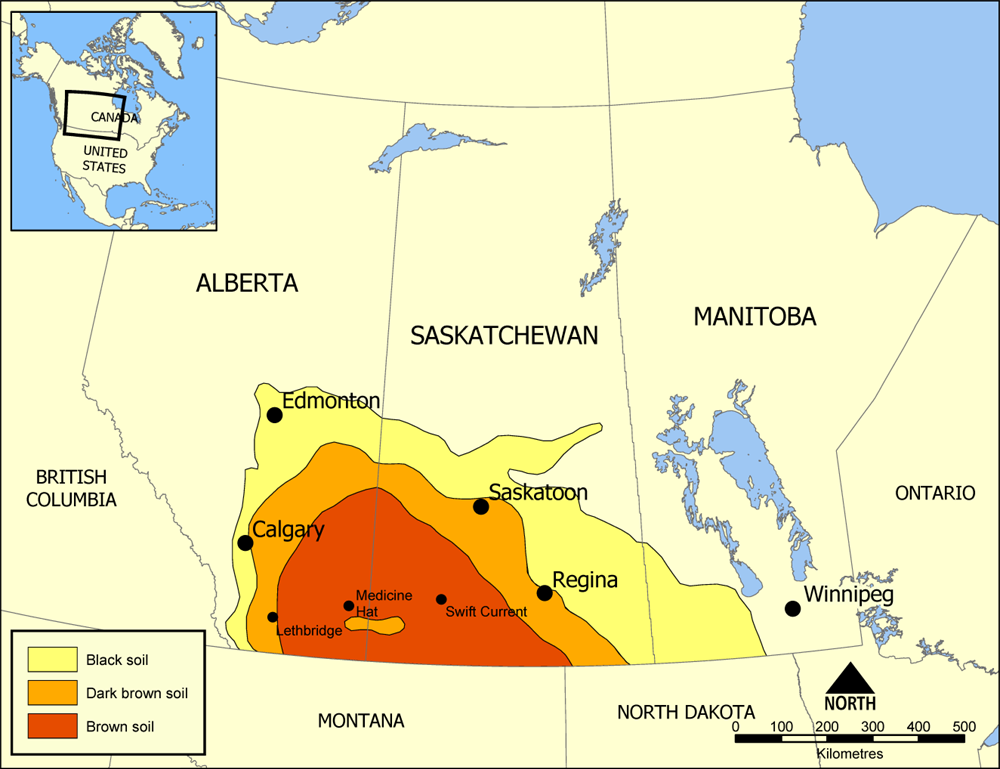
Map of Palliser's Triangle

Palliser's Triangle (French: Triangle de Palliser), or the Palliser Triangle, is a semi-arid steppe occupying a substantial portion of the Canadian Prairies, namely southern Alberta and southwestern Saskatchewan, within the Great Plains region. While initially determined to be unsuitable for crops outside of the fertile belt due to arid conditions and dry climate, expansionists questioned this assessment, leading to homesteading in the Triangle. Agriculture in the region has since suffered from frequent droughts and other such hindrances.

The region is named after the Irish/Canadian explorer John Palliser, who described it circa 1880.

== History ==
Before Western European interests and settlement expanded to the region, Palliser's Triangle was inhabited by a variety of Indigenous peoples, such as the nêhiyawak ᓀᐦᐃᔭᐘᐠ (Plains Cree), Očhéthi Šakówiŋ (Sioux), and the Niitsítapi (Blackfoot Confederacy). Their lifestyle was centred around the buffalo hunt, as the bountiful herds of buffalo made this a sustainable and effective means of feeding themselves, the meat of which was used to make pemmican. By the mid-1850s, however, the hunt had become an economic venture, their hides and meat sold by Métis and First Nations hunters to the Hudson's Bay Company (HBC), and the increased demand led to a decline in herds.

In the middle of the 19th century, a large variety of factors contributed to an increase in Canadian expansionism, and eyes fell upon what would become western Canada for this purpose given that the cold and uncultivatable Canadian Shield was found in the north whereas the expanding United States controlled the south. This American expansionism also drove Canadian expansionism due to the fear that the United States would look north and lay claim to the land before they could. With this said, it became apparent that no sources existed that had a full and reliable assessment of the land. While the HBC had a working knowledge of the land inasmuch as it was useful to their end and business interests, it was insufficient to the needs of the Canadian government. In addition, the HBC was hesitant to share information about the land they controlled for the sake of protecting their monopoly in the region. Even the Royal Geographical Society was uninformed about the North West. All the above drove the United Kingdom and the Dominion of Canada to organize the Palliser and Hind expeditions, respectively, especially since the 1840s discovery that latitude alone did not determine climate, which in turn suggested that good farmland may exist in the region.

The area was named after John Palliser, the leader of the aforementioned British Palliser expedition into Western Canada from 1857 to 1859. The expedition had the objective of spending two or three seasons:

1. In examining "the region along the Southern frontier of our territories, between the parallels of 49° and 53° north latitude, and from 100° to 115° west longitude" with a view to surveying "the watershed between the basins of the Missouri and the Saskachewan [sic]; also the course of the south branch of the Saskachewan and its tributaries; and... the actual line of the frontier, on the parallel of 49°";
2. In exploring "the Rocky Mountains, for the purpose of ascertaining the most southerly pass across to the Pacific, within the British Territory" since the well-known Athabasca Portage was too far north and "totally useless" for horses;
3. In reporting on "the natural features and general capabilities of the country" and mapping it. The R.G.S. also advised that scientific assistants should accompany Palliser.

The expeditions came to the conclusion that what would become western Canada was divided into three regions: a northern cold zone that was inhospitable to agriculture, Palliser's Triangle towards the south which Palliser characterized as an extension of the American Great Plains which he described as being "a more or less arid" desert and thus unsuitable for crops albeit acceptable for livestock given the “dry climate, sandy soil, and extensive grass cover," and a rich fertile belt in the middle that was ideally suited to agriculture and settlement, the existence of which was confirmed by both Palliser, and Henry Youle Hind, of Hind Expedition fame. They both argued against settling within the arid body of the Triangle. This changed perceptions of the region: previously seen as untamed wilderness, the British Canadian public began to see potential farmland in the Triangle. The prospect of an ample supply of fertile land lit a fire under Canadian expansionists, and the Canadian government started to buy up HBC land in the region as they were under pressure to ensure that it would be Canadians who settled the North West, not Americans. This began with the purchase of Rupert's Land for £300,000. This wellspring of expansionism came with the idea of a "Canadian Empire" of which the North West was a part of, in defiance of the idea that these lands were those of the First Nations and Métis who inhabited them at the time.

In this period of expansionism, one prominent figure advocating homesteading in the North West was botanist John Macoun. He undertook expeditions alongside Sir Sanford Fleming in the 1880s during which he had the chance to look at the ostensibly uncultivatable Palliser's Triangle. It turns out that Palliser saw the region in a state of drought during which ample buffalo herds were grazing the grass shorter. He also bore witness to a number of grass fires, all of which gave the impression of an inhospitable desert. Macoun, on the other hand, found the region in a major wet period after a severe decline in animal life in no small part due to the overhunting of bison. This skewed his perspective to the exact opposite of Palliser's assessment: where Palliser could be said to have underestimated the agricultural capacity of the Triangle, Macoun could be said to have overestimated it, as evidenced by both the region's production and its frequent and sometimes devastating droughts.

With Macoun's assessment in hand, the Canadian government undertook an advertising campaign to encourage European immigration to western Canada, which was joined by the distribution of 160-acre tracts of farmland for a token fee of ten dollars under the federal Dominion Lands Act. In addition, the planned Canadian Pacific Railway was moved southwards from its original route through the Parklands to instead pass through Palliser's Triangle for the sake of facilitating homesteading and grain shipment, thus further encouraging settlement in the region. Were it not for this fact, it is very likely that cities such as Calgary, Brandon and Regina would not exist as they do today.

Many farmers who did settle in the semi-arid portion of the Triangle between the period of the expedition and 1914 saw success, especially as the demand for wheat was driven up by the outbreak of the First World War, though many others were forced to partake in wage labour as hired farmhands, members of itinerant threshing crews, or manual labour for road and rail construction companies, logging camps and mining towns, to continue sustaining their farms. Furthermore, the influx of agricultural technology on larger farms that came with the wartime boon such as tractors, combines and trucks all cut labour requirements on larger farms and increased the capital needed to establish oneself as a farmer, further hampering smaller farms. The loss of employment opportunities was further compounded in the 1930s as the government completed rail and road projects, in addition to the cutting of government work budgets.

During the Great Depression the Triangle, like much of the Canadian and American Prairies, was struck by the Dust Bowl in the 1930s. This was caused, in large part, by a decrease in precipitation as well as longstanding flawed farming practices that exacerbated aeolian soil erosion and dust storm activity. This includes the practice of leaving fields fallow, seen as necessary at the time to support agriculture in the given climate, as it was believed that exposed soil would better absorb and retain moisture. Measures undertaken in Alberta and Saskatchewan have since alleviated many of these issues. The Alberta government had the Special Areas Board buy up as much drought-afflicted farmland as possible to convert to grazing land, 2.1 million hectares of which it still administers. Both provincial governments subsidized the relocation of farmers willing to leave their farms in the drought-stricken regions, and the federal government established the Prairie Farm Rehabilitation Administration in 1935, an organization that expanded on government research into soil erosion, carried out soil surveys, encouraged farmers to adopt soil conservation measures and new farming practices, and established shelterbelts and community pastures.

== Modern agriculture ==
This area was and is still very productive in terms of both produce and livestock. Alberta and Saskatchewan are currently the provinces with the second and third most farms, respectively, only being surpassed in this respect by much more populous Ontario. This is despite the fact that Palliser's Triangle, which occupies much of the southern portions of both of these provinces, has had consistent issues with droughts, almost every decade being marked by at least one dry year, in no small part due to the orographic lift caused by the Rockies, the Coast Mountains, the Cascade Range and the Sierra Nevada Range. This has much to do with efforts to maintain sustained agricultural practices such as crop diversification and conservation tillage which have softened the blow of complications that could have otherwise had far more severe effects.

Saskatchewan is currently the province with the largest amount of farmland, and the leading crops are canola, spring wheat and lentils. Cattle are also a major player in the farming economy, given that Saskatchewan has the second highest number of cattle of all the Canadian provinces. The reverse is true in Alberta, which has the second largest total farmland and the highest number of cattle. This Western Canadian agriculture is noticeably focused in the Palliser's Triangle region, demonstrating that agriculture in the area has persisted in spite of the dry climate.

Despite the frequent and sometimes disastrous droughts, the Triangle did become and still is the metaphorical breadbasket of the nation as he expected. However, the region has also suffered a major loss in terms of biodiversity over the course of settlement. Canada as a whole has found itself with under 20% of its mixed grass prairies, under 5% of its fescue prairies, and less than a half-percent of its tall grass prairies. In addition, the prairies have a very high rate of endangered species.

== See also ==
- Arid Diagonal of South America
- Aspen parkland
- Geography of Alberta
- Geography of Manitoba
- Geography of Saskatchewan
- Palliser Region
- Shortgrass prairie
- Steppe
