= Kinbrook Island Provincial Park =

Provincial park in Alberta, Canada

- Location within Alberta
- Interactive map of Kinbrook Island Provincial Park
- Location: County of Newell, Alberta, Canada
- Nearest city: Brooks
- Coordinates: 50°26′52″N 111°54′40″W
- Area: 11 km^{2} (4.2 sq mi)
- Established: November 14, 1951
- Governing body: Alberta Tourism, Parks and Recreation

Kinbrook Island Provincial Park is a provincial park in Alberta, Canada.

The park is situated at an elevation of 770 m (2,530 ft) and has a surface of 11 km^{2} (4.2 sq mi). It was established on November 14, 1951 and is maintained by Alberta Tourism, Parks and Recreation.

It is situated on the eastern shore of Lake Newell, 12 km south of the city of Brooks and within the County of Newell.

== Activities ==
The following activities are available in the park:

== See also ==
- List of provincial parks in Alberta
- List of Canadian provincial parks
- List of Canadian national parks
