= Bow City, Alberta (former village) =

Bow City
- Former village
- Location of the former Village of Bow City Bow City (Alberta)
- Coordinates: 50.425°N 112.273°W
- Country: Canada
- Province: Alberta
- Region: Southern Alberta
- Census division: 5
- Municipal district: Vulcan County
- Incorporated (village): July 13, 1914
- Dissolved: April 17, 1918

Government
  - Type: Unincorporated
  - Governing body: Vulcan County Council

Population
  - Total: 0
- Time zone: UTC−06:00 (Alberta Time)
- Area codes: 403, 587, 825
- Waterways: Bow River

Bow City is a former village located in southeast Alberta, Canada. It is located on Highway 539 on the south shore of the Bow River approximately 31 km (19 mi) southwest of the City of Brooks. The Hamlet of Bow City is located 3.5 km (2.2 mi) to the east on the north side of the Bow River in the County of Newell.

== Toponymy ==
Bow City was named by early developers, who hoped to convert the early coal mining community into a city rivalling Edmonton or Calgary.

== History ==
=== Founding of Eyremore: 1890-1908 ===
The area that became Bow City was first settled in the 1890s by William Moores and his family, who founded a ranch with Moores' friend, William Taylor Palmer 'Jack' Eyres. To name the ranch, they combined their surnames: Eyremore. (Eyres later married into the Moores family.)

Coal speculators entered the area in 1906, introducing small-scale mining operations. A community had developed by 1907, and Eyres opened a post office in December 1908, also under the name Eyremore.

As speculators descended upon the area, Eyremore attracted investment from companies based in North America and the United Kingdom. Plans for a city, and a railroad connecting the settlement to the United States and Hudson Bay, were drafted in the years preceding the First World War by a syndicate including Walter S. Galbraith, former mayor of Lethbridge.

=== Bow City: 1909-1918 ===
In July 1909, Galbraith's syndicate sold its interest in the land to Bow Centre Collieries. They determined that the name Bow City was more reflective of their ambition for the area, but all requests to have its post office renamed from Eyremore were rejected by Canada Post.

Developers launched an aggressive promotional campaign to entice settlers to the area, advertising Bow City as sure to become the "Pittsburgh of Canada." Advertisements contained falsehoods about the area's topographical features, such as claims that the flat landscape contained pine forests and mountains. The Bow City Board of Trade falsely claimed that "over 200,000 acres" of lands around the hamlet had been irrigated.

A school opened in 1910, and, in 1913, construction began on a railway towards the Cassils line of the Canadian Pacific Railway (CPR). At this time, Bow City's population had risen to 50 people from 12 at the turn of the decade. Businesses included a hardware store, pharmacy, and pool hall, and construction began on a three-storey hotel. A newspaper, Bow City Star, also operated briefly during 1913.

By the end of the year, however, it became apparent that Bow Centre Collieries was not able to finance the finished construction of a railway line. Furthermore, the CPR opted to introduce its next branch line 25 miles south of Bow City, and the provincial government rejected a petition to incorporate Bow City as a village.

Bow City's fortunes appeared briefly to reverse in the first half of 1914. Its hotel opened in June, and the provincial government relented on incorporating Bow City as a village on July 13, 1914. However, the outbreak of the First World War on July 28 ended British capital investment almost overnight, and farmers' hopes for irrigation of the Bow River were dashed when the Alberta Land Company entered receivership later in the year.

Bow City's population dropped from 125 residents in 1915 to 28 by June 1916. The settlement's rapid decline was exacerbated by its hotel burning down in July 1915. The absence of a train connection also stunted the economic growth of remaining coal mining operations. Bow City lost its village status on April 17, 1918. At this time, it had a population of around 6 residents. In 1921, Jack Eyres and his wife, Frances, left Bow City due to unfavourable agricultural conditions, relocating to Calgary instead.

=== Later developments: 1919-present ===
Mining operations continued in the settlement for some decades after, and Bow City enjoyed a minor resurgence during the Second World War, owing to the demand for coal in the production of war materials. Nonetheless, early aspirations of a permanent settlement did not transpire. Mining operations moved to the south of the river, as did most settlers, creating a new hamlet by the same name. The original Bow City's school closed in 1945.

Bow City was home to around 16 residents in 1956. Canada Post finally consented to changing the name of Eyremore's post office to Bow City in 1958, though it would cease operations in 1966. As of 2014, the original Bow City site contains a "scattered collection of acreages and a park," as described by historian Jonathan Koch.

== Bow City impact crater ==
According to Wired magazine a paper presented at an American Geophysical Union Conference in December 2012 by Wei Xie of the University of Alberta described a buried crater under Bow City.

== Demographics ==
Population history of Bow City
Year	Pop.	±%
1916	28	—
Source: Statistics Canada

In the 1916 Census of Prairie Provinces, Bow City had a population of 28.

== See also ==
- List of former urban municipalities in Alberta
