= Skandia (disambiguation) =

Skandia is an insurance company.

Skandia may also refer to:

- Skandia Township, Marquette County, Michigan
- Skandia Township, Murray County, Minnesota
- Skandia Township, Barnes County, North Dakota
- Skandia (1996 yacht)
- Skandia (2003 yacht)

== See also ==
- Scandia (disambiguation)
- Skandia PGA Open, a golf tournament played annually in Sweden from 2001 to 2005
- Skandia, a locale in the Ranger's Apprentice by Australian author John Flanagan
