= Rolling Hills, Alberta =

Hamlet in Alberta, Canada

Rolling Hills
- Hamlet
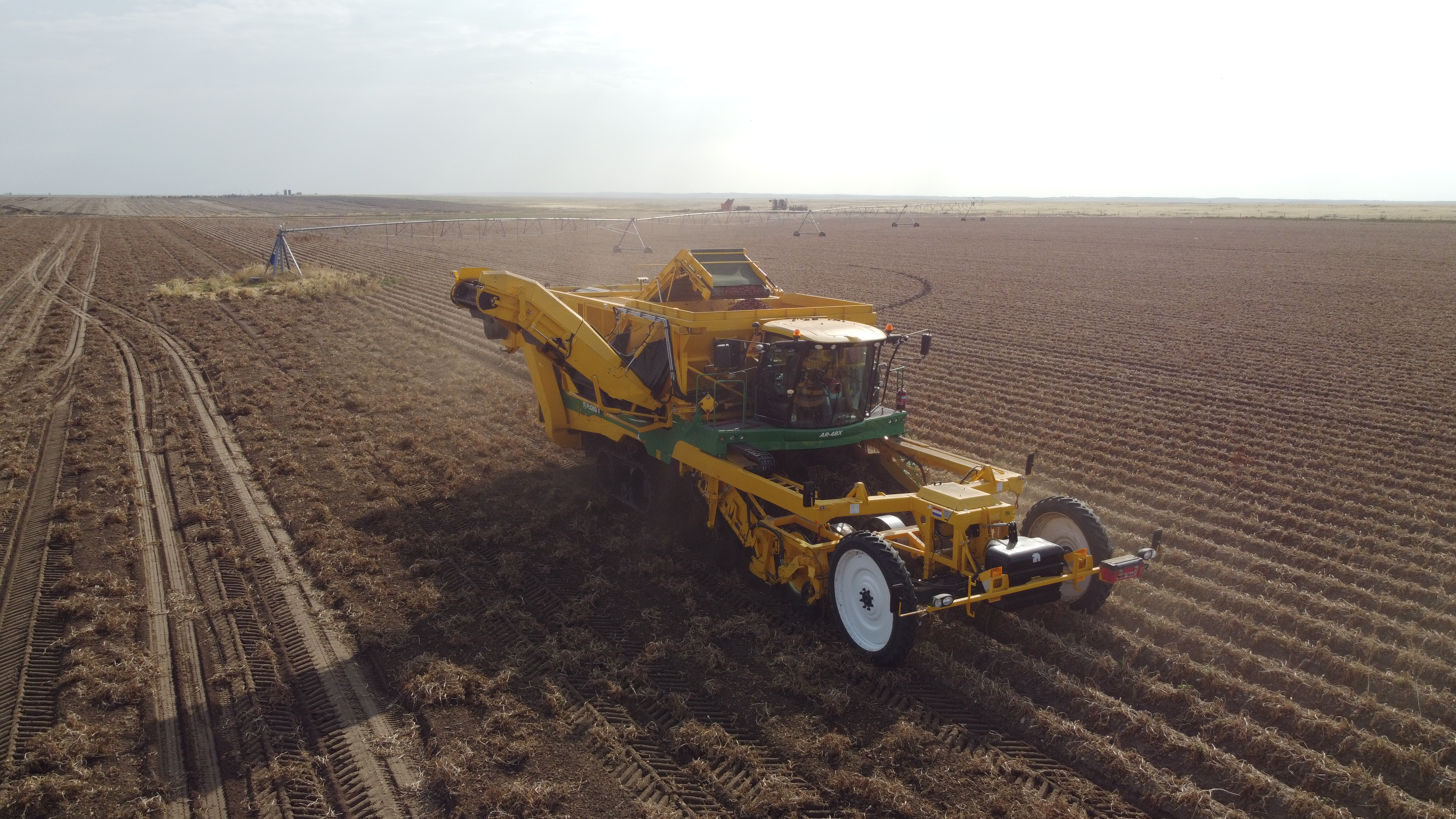

- Location of Rolling Hills Rolling Hills (Canada)
- Coordinates: 50°13′32″N 111°46′28″W
- Country: Canada
- Province: Alberta
- Region: Southern Alberta
- Census division: 2
- Municipal district: County of Newell

Government
  - Type: Unincorporated
  - Governing body: County of Newell Council

Area (2021)
  - Land: 0.69 km^{2} (0.27 sq mi)

Population (2021)
  - Total: 273
  - Density: 397.6/km^{2} (1,030/sq mi)
- Time zone: UTC−06:00 (Alberta Time)
- Area codes: 403, 587, 825

Rolling Hills is a hamlet in southern Alberta, Canada within the County of Newell. Rolling Hills was founded in 1939 by the Prairie Farm Rehabilitation Administration (PFRA) with settlers from dried out regions of Saskatchewan and Alberta.

== Demographics ==
Population history of Rolling Hills
Year	Pop.	±%
1941	62	—
1951	142	+129.0%
1956	134	−5.6%
1961	171	+27.6%
1966	132	−22.8%
1971	127	−3.8%
1976	171	+34.6%
1981	175	+2.3%
1986	176	+0.6%
1991	164	−6.8%
1991A	170	+3.7%
1996	178	+4.7%
2001	234	+31.5%
2006	246	+5.1%
2011	205	−16.7%
2016	258	+25.9%
2021	273	+5.8%
Source: Statistics Canada

In the 2021 Census of Population conducted by Statistics Canada, Rolling Hills had a population of 273 living in 108 of its 113 total private dwellings, a change of 5.8% from its 2016 population of 258. With a land area of 0.69 km^{2} (0.27 sq mi), it had a population density of 395.7/km^{2} (1,024.7/sq mi) in 2021.

The population of Rolling Hills according to the 2020 municipal census conducted by the County of Newell is 263.

As a designated place in the 2016 Census of Population conducted by Statistics Canada, Rolling Hills had a population of 258 living in 101 of its 104 total private dwellings, a change of 25.9% from its 2011 population of 205. With a land area of 0.69 km^{2} (0.27 sq mi), it had a population density of 373.9/km^{2} (968.4/sq mi) in 2016.

== Economy ==
Rolling Hills’ primary industry is agriculture. Specialty crops grown in the area include dry edible beans, sugar beets, potatoes, seed canola and seed alfalfa. Cattle have always been a major part of the agricultural landscape in the Rolling Hills area.

== Education ==
One school, serving pre-kindergarten through grade 9, is located in Rolling Hills. After grade 9, students attend high school in Brooks, which is approximately 50 km (31 mi) northwest of Rolling Hills.

== See also ==
- List of communities in Alberta
- List of designated places in Alberta
- List of hamlets in Alberta
