= Scandia, Alberta =

Scandia
- Hamlet
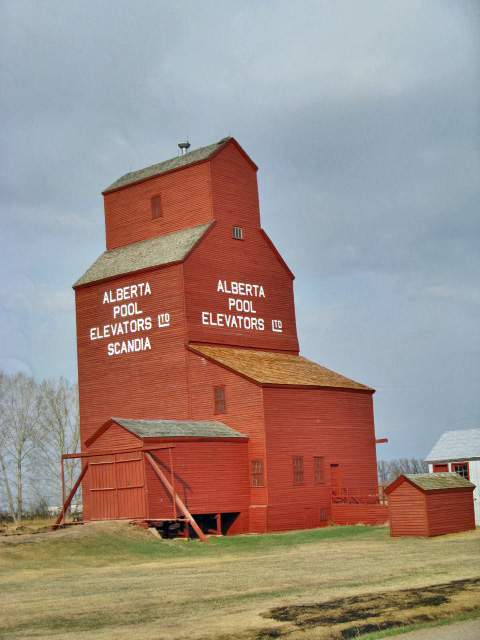
- Last remaining prairie grain elevator in the Scandia district.

- Scandia
- Coordinates: 50°16′41″N 112°02′48″W
- Country: Canada
- Province: Alberta
- Region: Southern Alberta
- Census division: 2
- Municipal district: County of Newell

Government
  - Governing body: County of Newell Council

Area (2021)
  - Land: 0.19 km^{2} (0.073 sq mi)

Population (2021)
  - Total: 169
  - Density: 877.9/km^{2} (2,274/sq mi)
- Time zone: UTC−06:00 (Alberta Time)
- Postal code span: T0J 2Z0
- Area code: +1-403
- Highways: Highway 36

Scandia is a hamlet in Alberta, Canada within the County of Newell. It is located 2 kilometres (1.2 mi) west of Highway 36, approximately 34 kilometres (21 mi) southwest of Brooks.

== History ==
The 23.4 mile Cassils Southerly Branch of the Canadian Pacific Railway was built from Cassils to Scandia in 1927–1928.

== Demographics ==
Population history of Scandia
Year	Pop.	±%
1941	30	—
1951	64	+113.3%
1956	64	+0.0%
1961	51	−20.3%
1966	45	−11.8%
1971	34	−24.4%
1976	38	+11.8%
1981	79	+107.9%
1986	113	+43.0%
1991	115	+1.8%
1991A	116	+0.9%
1996	119	+2.6%
2001	114	−4.2%
2006	137	+20.2%
2011	154	+12.4%
2016	146	−5.2%
2021	169	+15.8%
Source: Statistics Canada

In the 2021 Census of Population conducted by Statistics Canada, Scandia had a population of 169 living in 52 of its 56 total private dwellings, a change of 15.8% from its 2016 population of 146. With a land area of 0.19 km^{2} (0.073 sq mi), it had a population density of 889.5/km^{2} (2,303.7/sq mi) in 2021.

The population of Scandia according to the 2020 municipal census conducted by the County of Newell is 169.

As a designated place in the 2016 Census of Population conducted by Statistics Canada, Scandia had a population of 146 living in 43 of its 54 total private dwellings, a change of −5.2% from its 2011 population of 154. With a land area of 0.19 km^{2} (0.073 sq mi), it had a population density of 768.4/km^{2} (1,990.2/sq mi) in 2016.

== Attractions ==
- Scandia Eastern Irrigation District Museum

== See also ==
- List of communities in Alberta
- List of designated places in Alberta
- List of hamlets in Alberta
- List of museums in Alberta
- List of provincial historic sites of Alberta
