= Bow City, Alberta (hamlet) =

Bow City
- Hamlet
- Location of Bow City Bow City (Canada)
- Coordinates: 50°25′58″N 112°13′36″W
- Country: Canada
- Province: Alberta
- Region: Southern Alberta
- Census division: 2
- Municipal district: County of Newell

Government
  - Type: Unincorporated
  - Governing body: County of Newell Council

Population (2020)
  - Total: 16
- Time zone: UTC−06:00 (Alberta Time)
- Area codes: 403, 587, 825

Bow City is a hamlet located in southeast Alberta, Canada within the County of Newell. It is located on Highway 539 on the north shore of the Bow River approximately 27 km (17 mi) southwest of the City of Brooks. The former Village of Bow City is located 3.5 km (2.2 mi) to the west on the south side of the Bow River in Vulcan County.

The Bow City crater is located underground nearby.

== Demographics ==
The population of Bow City according to the 2020 municipal census conducted by the County of Newell is 16.

== See also ==
- List of communities in Alberta
- List of hamlets in Alberta
