= Bantry Bay (disambiguation) =

Bantry Bay is a bay in southwest Ireland.

Bantry Bay may also refer to:

- Bantry Bay (New South Wales), a bay off Sydney Harbour, Australia
- Bantry Bay, Cape Town, a suburb of Cape Town, Western Cape, South Africa
