= Scandia Eastern Irrigation District Museum =

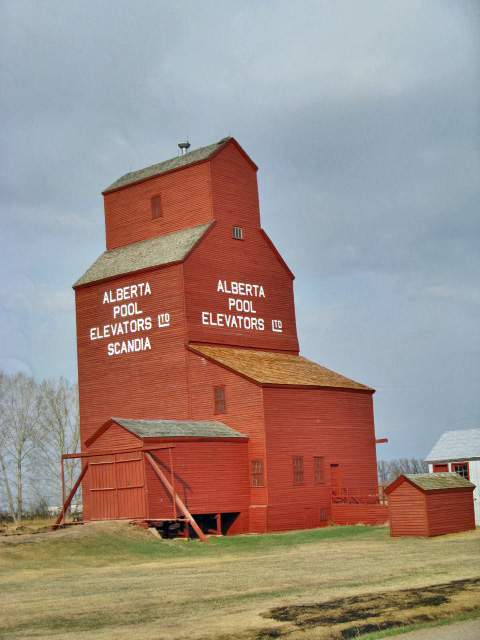
- Location: Scandia, Alberta, Canada
- Coordinates: 50.2766°N 112.0468°W
- Type: open-air, Irrigation museum
- Website: Eastern Irrigation District Historical Park

The Scandia Eastern Irrigation District Museum is an open-air museum in Southern Alberta, Canada. The museum includes a historic 1925 Alberta Wheat Pool grain elevator, Bow Slope Stockyard, and displays of how irrigation has affected the prosperity of the area. The museum is part of Eastern Irrigation District Historical Park, which also includes a blacksmith shop, barn, general store, stock yards and river ferry.

== Jenner Station ==
In 2011-2012 the community and museum society moved the historic 103-year-old Canadian Pacific Railway station from the hamlet of Jenner to their park in Scandia. The station has since been restored and is now used as a theater and community gathering place.

== See also ==
- List of museums in Alberta
- Scandia, Alberta
