= Lake Newell =

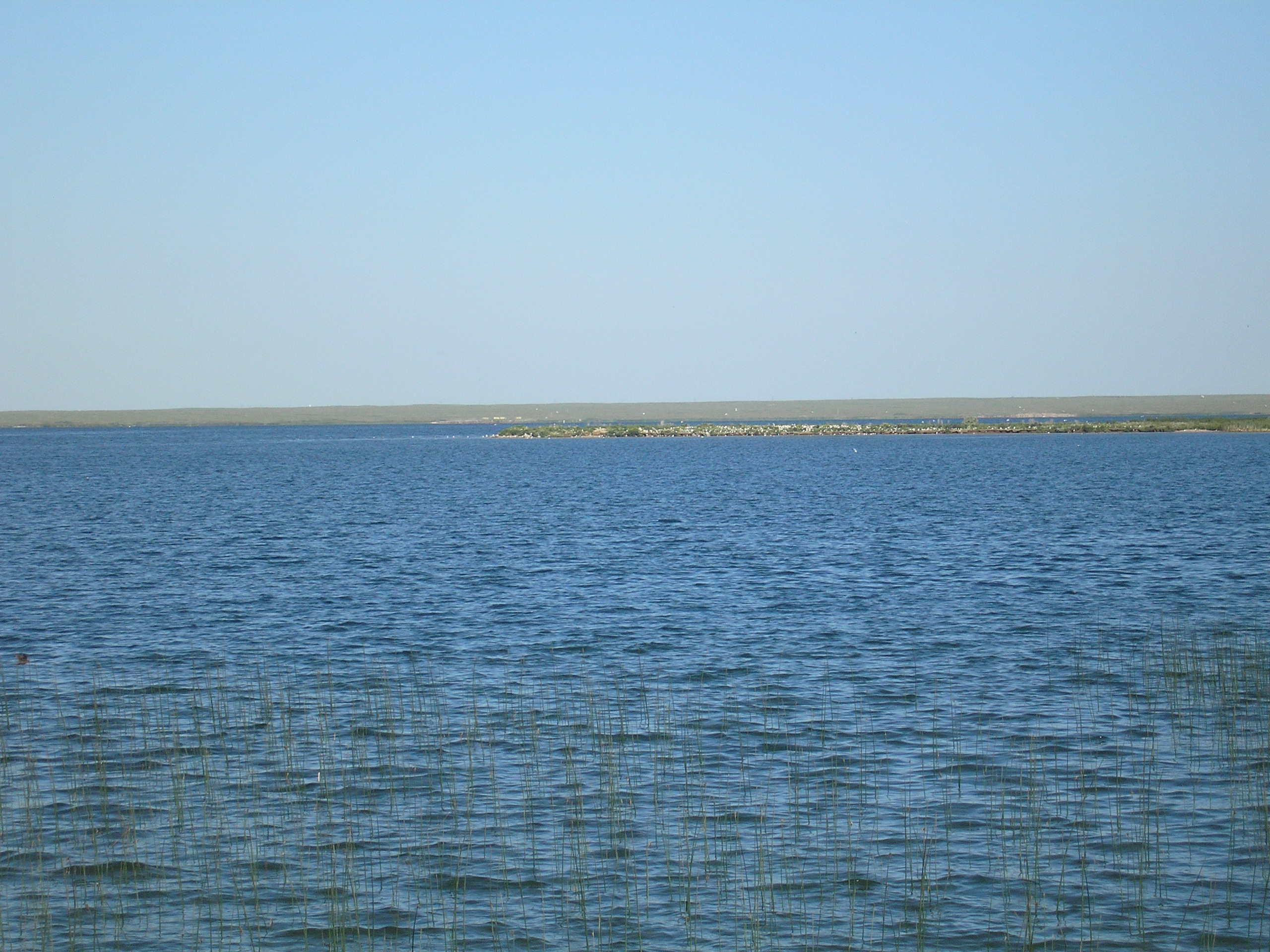
- Lake Newell from Kinbrook Provincial Park

- Location within Alberta
- Location: County of Newell, Alberta
- Coordinates: 50°26′04″N 111°56′06″W
- Type: Reservoir
- Primary outflows: Rolling Hills Lake, Bow River
- Catchment area: 84.6 km^{2} (32.7 sq mi)
- Basin countries: Canada
- Max. length: 14 kilometres (8.7 mi)
- Max. width: 6.5 kilometres (4.0 mi)
- Surface area: 66.4 km^{2} (25.6 sq mi)
- Average depth: 4.8 metres (16 ft)
- Max. depth: 19.8 metres (65 ft)
- Surface elevation: 765 metres (2,510 ft)

Lake Newell is a large man-made reservoir in southern Alberta, Canada. It is located 14 kilometres (8.7 mi) south of the city of Brooks, east of Veteran Highway. The reservoir was filled in 1914 through the construction of the Bassano Dam. It was named after T.H. Newell, a landowner and irrigation expert. The County of Newell is in turn named after the lake.

The lake covers a surface of 66.4 square kilometres (25.6 sq mi) and has a drainage basin of 84.6 square kilometres (32.7 sq mi). The shallow lake has an average depth of 4.8 metres (16 ft) and reaches a maximum depth of 19.8 metres (65 ft). It lies at an elevation of 765 metres (2,510 ft). The lake adjoins two man made wetlands: Kinbrook Marsh North and Kinbrook Marsh South.

It empties into the Bow River after flowing through Rolling Hills Lake, an extension of the lake, filled when the dam was raised in 1939. Irrigation canals are built between the lake and the Bow River, as well as in the agricultural area north and east of the lake. Kinbrook Island Provincial Park was established in the eastern shore of the lake on November 14, 1951.

== See also ==
- Lakes of Alberta
- Lake Newell Resort, Alberta
