= Patricia, Alberta =

Patricia
- Hamlet
- Location of Patricia Patricia (Canada)
- Coordinates: 50°41′58″N 111°40′37″W
- Country: Canada
- Province: Alberta
- Region: Southern Alberta
- Census division: 2
- Municipal district: County of Newell
- Founder: Canadian Pacific Railway
- Named for: Princess Patricia of Connaught

Government
  - Type: Unincorporated
  - Governing body: County of Newell Council

Area (2021)
  - Land: 0.59 km^{2} (0.23 sq mi)

Population (2021)
  - Total: 78
  - Density: 131.1/km^{2} (340/sq mi)
- Time zone: UTC−06:00 (Alberta Time)
- Area codes: 403, 587, 825

Patricia is a hamlet in southern Alberta, Canada within the County of Newell. It is located approximately 20 kilometres (12 mi) north of Highway 1 and 21 kilometres (13 mi) northeast of Brooks.

Patricia is near Dinosaur Provincial Park, which is a UNESCO World Heritage Site. It was named after Princess Patricia of Connaught.

The Hamlet of Patricia was briefly famous in the 1970s when a local rancher Albert Ketchmark gifted then Prime Minister Pierre Trudeau a lot in the community as part of their mother's estate, as a joke. The Prime Minister's ownership of the 50 by 130 foot lot became national news when the County of Newell noted Trudeau owed $3 in property tax and possibly another $3 in back taxes on the property. The Prime Minister's Office when asked about the situation stated they were unaware of the transfer and had not been supplied with a deed transfer or tax bill. The taxes were paid by Jim Nesbitt, the publisher of the local Brooks Bulletin and Liberal Party member, and Trudeau refused to accept ownership of the lot, even just to transfer it to the County. The matter was settled in Supreme Court of Alberta when Trudeau's lawyers argued the transfer amounted to an imperfect gift, and the Justice ruled the property title cancelled.

== Demographics ==
In the 2021 Census of Population conducted by Statistics Canada, Patricia had a population of 78 living in 42 of its 48 total private dwellings, a change of −22.8% from its 2016 population of 101. With a land area of 0.59 km^{2} (0.23 sq mi), it had a population density of 132.2/km^{2} (342.4/sq mi) in 2021.

The population of Patricia according to the 2020 municipal census conducted by the County of Newell is 88.

As a designated place in the 2016 Census of Population conducted by Statistics Canada, Patricia had a population of 101 living in 46 of its 50 total private dwellings, a change of −6.5% from its 2011 population of 108. With a land area of 0.59 km^{2} (0.23 sq mi), it had a population density of 171.2/km^{2} (443.4/sq mi) in 2016.

== See also ==
- List of communities in Alberta
- List of designated places in Alberta
- List of hamlets in Alberta
- Royal eponyms in Canada
