= Duc de Bassano =

French noble title

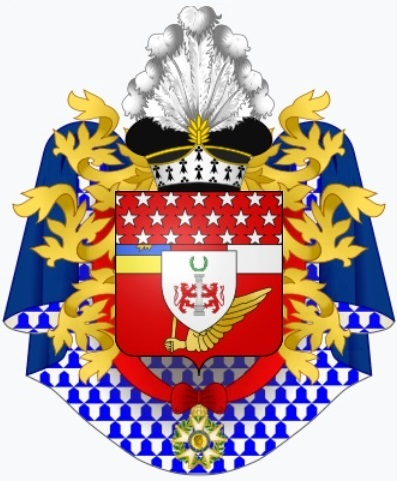
Heraldic achievement of the 1st Duke of Bassano

The French titles of Count Maret and Duke of Bassano were created by Emperor Napoleon I, in 1807 and 1809 respectively, for Hugues-Bernard Maret, a French diplomat and statesman. The ducal title refers to Bassano del Grappa in Italy.

Both titles became extinct in 1906, upon the death of the first duke's grandson.

== Duc de Bassano (1809) ==
- Jean Philibert Maret (1758–1827), Count of Maret
- Hugues-Bernard Maret, 1st Duc de Bassano (1763–1839)
- Napoléon Hugues Joseph Maret de Bassano, 2nd Duc de Bassano (1803–1898)
- Napoléon Hugues Charles Marie Ghislain Maret de Bassano, 3rd Duc de Bassano (1844–1906)
