= Bantry, Alberta =

Coordinates: 50.48341°N 111.75178°W

Bantry is a locality in Alberta, Canada.

Bantry takes its name from Bantry Bay, in Ireland.
