= Cassils, Alberta =

Cassils
- Hamlet
- Location of Cassils Cassils (Canada)
- Coordinates: 50°34′43″N 112°2′54″W
- Country: Canada
- Province: Alberta
- Region: Southern Alberta
- Census division: 2
- Municipal district: County of Newell

Government
  - Type: Unincorporated
  - Governing body: County of Newell Council

Population (2020)
  - Total: 22
- Time zone: UTC−06:00 (Alberta Time)
- Area codes: 403, 587, 825

Cassils is a hamlet in southern Alberta, Canada within the County of Newell. It is located on the north side of a Canadian Pacific rail line 2.9 km (1.8 mi) west of the intersection of Highway 36 and Highway 542. It is 10 km (6.2 mi) west of the City of Brooks and 7.5 km (4.7 mi) south of the Trans-Canada Highway (Highway 1).

The hamlet is named after Charles Cassils, of the Montreal firm of Cassils and Cochrane. Cassils, a native of Dumbartonshire, Scotland, died July 2, 1908, aged 77.

== Demographics ==
The population of Cassils according to the 2020 municipal census conducted by the County of Newell is 22.

== See also ==
- List of communities in Alberta
- List of hamlets in Alberta
