= Tilley, Alberta =

Tilley
- Hamlet
- Aerial view of downtown Tilley, 2026

- Location of Tilley Tilley (Canada)
- Coordinates: 50°27′8″N 111°39′27″W
- Country: Canada
- Province: Alberta
- Region: Southern Alberta
- Census Division: No. 2
- Municipal district: County of Newell
- Founded: 1910
- Incorporated (village): May 9, 1940
- Dissolved: August 31, 2013

Government
  - Governing body: County of Newell Council

Area (2021)
  - Land: 0.69 km^{2} (0.27 sq mi)

Population (2021)
  - Total: 318
  - Density: 461.5/km^{2} (1,195/sq mi)
- Time zone: UTC−06:00 (Alberta Time)
- Postal Code: T0J 3K0
- Area code: +1-403
- Highways: Trans-Canada Highway 876

Tilley is a hamlet in southern Alberta, Canada within the County of Newell. It is located approximately 22 km southeast of the City of Brooks and 78 km northwest of the City of Medicine Hat.

== History ==
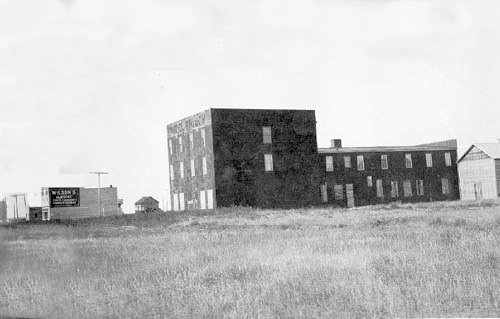
Tilley, 1920s

Founded in 1910 during the construction of the Canadian Pacific Railway main line, Tilley was incorporated as a village on May 9, 1940. It dissolved from village status on August 31, 2013, to become a hamlet under the jurisdiction of the County of Newell.

== Demographics ==
Historical population
Year	Pop.	±%
1941	189	—
1946	189	+0.0%
1951	259	+37.0%
1956	240	−7.3%
1961	245	+2.1%
1966	257	+4.9%
1971	254	−1.2%
1976	347	+36.6%
1981	311	−10.4%
1986	362	+16.4%
1991	322	−11.0%
1996	368	+14.3%
2001	422	+14.7%
2006	381	−9.7%
2011	352	−7.6%
2016	364	+3.4%
2021	318	−12.6%
2011 count revised from original tabulation. Sources:

In the 2021 Census of Population conducted by Statistics Canada, Tilley had a population of 318 living in 132 of its 144 total private dwellings, a change of −12.6% from its 2016 population of 364. With a land area of 0.69 km^{2} (0.27 sq mi), it had a population density of 460.9/km^{2} (1,193.6/sq mi) in 2021.

The population of Tilley according to the 2020 municipal census conducted by the County of Newell is 335, a decrease from its 2007 municipal census population count of 405.

As a designated place in the 2016 Census of Population conducted by Statistics Canada, Tilley had a population of 364 living in 139 of its 149 total private dwellings, a change of 3.4% from its 2011 population of 352. With a land area of 0.7 km^{2} (0.27 sq mi), it had a population density of 520.0/km^{2} (1,346.8/sq mi) in 2016.

== Economy ==
Tilley's main industries are agriculture (irrigated crop farming and livestock operations) and petroleum.

== Attractions ==
Amenities within Tilley include an arena, a curling rink, a community hall, hotel & bar and three parks.

== Education ==
Tilley Public School, operated by Grasslands Public Schools, serves students in kindergarten through grade 9. In 2023 a new school in Tilley was completed. It replaced the original Tilley school which was built in 1946.

== See also ==
- List of communities in Alberta
- List of former urban municipalities in Alberta
- List of hamlets in Alberta
