= Rosemary, Alberta =

Rosemary
- Village
- Village of Rosemary
- Location of Rosemary
- Coordinates: 50°45′27″N 112°05′5″W
- Country: Canada
- Province: Alberta
- Region: Southern Alberta
- Census Division: 2
- Municipal district: County of Newell
- Incorporated
  - Village: December 31, 1951

Government
  - Mayor: Don L. Gibb
  - Governing body: Rosemary Village Council

Area (2021)
  - Land: 0.59 km^{2} (0.23 sq mi)
- Elevation: 745 m (2,444 ft)

Population (2021)
  - Total: 370
  - Density: 630.3/km^{2} (1,632/sq mi)
- Time zone: UTC−06:00 (Alberta Time)
- Highways: 550
- Waterways: Rock Lake
- Website: Official website

Rosemary is a village in southern Alberta, Canada. It is approximately 30 km (19 mi) northwest of Brooks and 14 km (8.7 mi) north of the Trans-Canada Highway. It is home to one school and several businesses.

== Demographics ==
In the 2021 Census of Population conducted by Statistics Canada, the Village of Rosemary had a population of 370 living in 139 of its 167 total private dwellings, a change of −6.6% from its 2016 population of 396. With a land area of 0.59 km^{2} (0.23 sq mi), it had a population density of 627.1/km^{2} (1,624.2/sq mi) in 2021.

In the 2016 Census of Population conducted by Statistics Canada, the Village of Rosemary recorded a population of 396 living in 146 of its 150 total private dwellings, a 15.8% change from its 2011 population of 342. With a land area of 0.59 km^{2} (0.23 sq mi), it had a population density of 671.2/km^{2} (1,738.4/sq mi) in 2016.

The Village of Rosemary's 2012 municipal census counted a population of 421.

== See also ==
- List of communities in Alberta
- List of villages in Alberta
