= Rainier, Alberta =

Rainier
- Hamlet
- Location of Rainier Rainier (Canada)
- Coordinates: 50°22′06″N 112°05′33″W
- Country: Canada
- Province: Alberta
- Region: Southern Alberta
- Census division: 2
- Municipal district: County of Newell

Government
  - Type: Unincorporated
  - Governing body: County of Newell Council

Population (2020)
  - Total: 22
- Time zone: UTC−06:00 (Alberta Time)
- Area codes: 403, 587, 825

Rainier is a hamlet in southern Alberta, Canada within the County of Newell. It is located 5 kilometres (3.1 mi) west of Highway 36 and approximately 26 kilometres (16 mi) southwest of Brooks.

== Demographics ==
The population of Rainier according to the 2020 municipal census conducted by the County of Newell is 22.

== See also ==
- List of communities in Alberta
- List of hamlets in Alberta
