= Duchess, Alberta =

Duchess
- Village
- Village of Duchess
- Motto: Where the Swan Sits
- Location in Alberta
- Coordinates: 50°43′59″N 111°54′23.2″W
- Country: Canada
- Province: Alberta
- Region: Southern Alberta
- Census division: 2
- Municipal district: County of Newell
- Incorporated
  - Village: May 12, 1921

Government
  - Mayor: Tony Steidel
  - Governing body: Duchess Village Council

Area (2021)
  - Land: 1.93 km^{2} (0.75 sq mi)
- Elevation: 760 m (2,490 ft)

Population (2021)
  - Total: 1,053
  - Density: 545.9/km^{2} (1,414/sq mi)
- Time zone: UTC−06:00 (Alberta Time)
- Highways: Veteran Memorial Highway
- Waterway: Rock Lake
- Website: Official website

Duchess is a village in southern Alberta, Canada that is surrounded by the County of Newell. It is north of Brooks and the Trans-Canada Highway.

The village was named for Duchess Louise Marguerite. It is mainly a ranching community.

== Demographics ==
In the 2021 Census of Population conducted by Statistics Canada, the Village of Duchess had a population of 1,053 living in 378 of its 404 total private dwellings, a change of −2.9% from its 2016 population of 1,085. With a land area of 1.93 km^{2} (0.75 sq mi), it had a population density of 545.6/km^{2} (1,413.1/sq mi) in 2021.

In the 2016 Census of Population conducted by Statistics Canada, the Village of Duchess recorded a population of 1,085 living in 371 of its 390 total private dwellings, a 9.4% change from its 2011 population of 992. With a land area of 1.96 km^{2} (0.76 sq mi), it had a population density of 553.6/km^{2} (1,433.7/sq mi) in 2016.

== Notable people ==
- Jeff Shantz, professional hockey player
- Cheryl Bartlett, biologist

== See also ==
- List of communities in Alberta
- List of villages in Alberta
