= Bassano, Alberta =

Bassano
- Town
- Town of Bassano
- Bassano in 2026
- Motto: The Best in the West by a damsite
- Location of Bassano in Alberta
- Coordinates: 50°47′03″N 112°27′05″W
- Country: Canada
- Province: Alberta
- Region: Southern Alberta
- Census division: 2
- Municipal district: County of Newell
- Incorporated
  - Village: December 28, 1909
  - Town: January 16, 1911

Government
  - Mayor: Mike Wetstain
  - Governing body: Bassano Town Council
  - MP: David Bexte
  - MLA: Danielle Smith

Area (2021)
  - Land: 5.23 km^{2} (2.02 sq mi)
- Elevation: 792 m (2,598 ft)

Population (2021)
  - Total: 1,216
  - Density: 232.5/km^{2} (602/sq mi)
- Time zone: UTC−06:00 (Alberta Time)
- Area code: +1-403
- Highways: Highway 1
- Waterways: Crawling Valley Reservoir; Bow River
- Website: Official website

Bassano (/bəˈsænoʊ/ bə-SAN-oh) is a town in Alberta, Canada. It is located on the Trans-Canada Highway approximately 140 kilometres (87 mi) southeast of Calgary and 160 kilometres (99 mi) northwest of Medicine Hat. It is also on the main line of the Canadian Pacific Kansas City. A short distance south of the town is the Bassano Dam (originally "Horse Shoe Bend Dam"), serves as a diversion structure which routes water through a canal into Lake Newell Reservoir which supplies water to the majority of the County of Newell for purposes like irrigation, recreation, and the County's drinking water.

The Bassano Dam holds the record for highest temperature in Alberta which is 43.3 °C (109.9 °F).

The community has the name of Marquis de Bassano, a railroad promoter.

== Demographics ==
The Bassano Dam

In the 2021 Census of Population conducted by Statistics Canada, the Town of Bassano had a population of 1,216 living in 540 of its 595 total private dwellings, a change of 0.8% from its 2016 population of 1,206. With a land area of 5.23 km^{2} (2.02 sq mi), it had a population density of 232.5/km^{2} (602.2/sq mi) in 2021.

In the 2016 Census of Population conducted by Statistics Canada, the Town of Bassano recorded a population of 1,206 living in 536 of its 556 total private dwellings, a −5.9% change from its 2011 population of 1,282. With a land area of 5.22 km^{2} (2.02 sq mi), it had a population density of 231.0/km^{2} (598.4/sq mi) in 2016.

== Infrastructure ==
The town has emergency medical services provided by Bassano Health Centre.

== Notable people ==
- Arno Doerksen, Canadian politician; MLA for Strathmore-Brooks from 2008 to 2012
- Jim Henshaw – Canadian voice actor
- Joseph B. Martin – Physician who served as dean of Harvard Medical School 1997–2007
- Rick May (1940 – 2020) – Canadian-American actor, theatrical performer, director, and teacher.
- Mike Toth – Sportscaster

== See also ==
- List of communities in Alberta
- List of towns in Alberta
