= County of Newell =

Municipal district in Alberta, Canada

- Municipal district
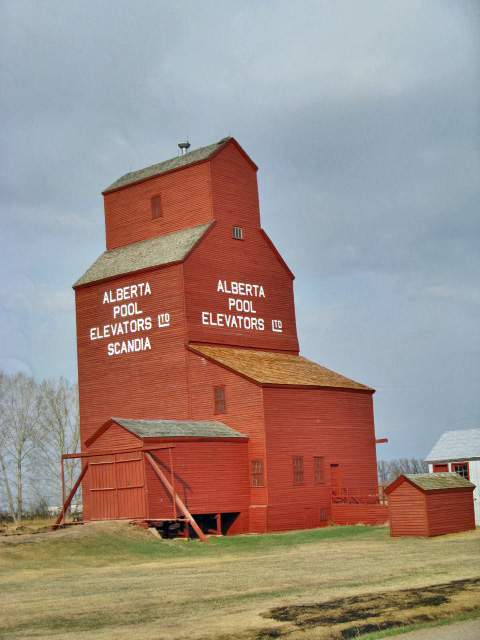
- Last remaining prairie grain elevators in the Scandia district. Scandia

- Logo

- Location within Alberta
- Coordinates: 50°33′51″N 111°53′56″W
- Country: Canada
- Province: Alberta
- Region: Southern Alberta
- Census division: 2
- Established: 1948
- Incorporated: 1953

Government
  - Reeve: Arno Doerksen
  - Governing body: County of Newell Council
  - Administrative office: south of Brooks

Area (2021)
  - Land: 5,810.15 km^{2} (2,243.31 sq mi)

Population (2021)
  - Total: 7,465
  - Density: 1.3/km^{2} (3.4/sq mi)
- Time zone: UTC−06:00 (Alberta Time)
- Website: countyofnewell.ab.ca

The County of Newell is a municipal district in southern Alberta, Canada. Located in Census Division No. 2, its municipal office is located south of the City of Brooks.

== History ==
It was incorporated as the County of Newell No. 4 on January 1, 1953, through the amalgamation of the Municipal District of Newell No. 28 and part of the Municipal District of Bow Valley No. 40. Its name was changed to the County of Newell on September 9, 2011.

== Geography ==
=== Communities and localities ===
The following urban municipalities are surrounded by the County of Newell.

Cities

- Brooks

Towns

- Bassano

Villages

- Duchess
- Rosemary

Summer villages

- none

The following hamlets are located within the County of Newell.

Hamlets

- Bow City
- Cassils
- Gem
- Lake Newell Resort
- Patricia
- Rainier
- Rolling Hills
- Scandia
- Tilley

The following localities are located within the County of Newell.

Localities

- Bantry
- Campbell
- Control
- Countess
- Denhart
- Fieldholme
- Granta
- Hants
- Kinbrook
- Kininvie
- Kitsim
- Lathom
- Mallow
- Matzhiwin
- Millicent
- Princess
- Redelback
- Southesk
- Steveville
- Verger

== Demographics ==
In the 2021 Census of Population conducted by Statistics Canada, the County of Newell had a population of 7,465 living in 2,404 of its 2,642 total private dwellings, a change of −0.8% from its 2016 population of 7,524. With a land area of 5,810.15 km^{2} (2,243.31 sq mi), it had a population density of 1.3/km^{2} (3.3/sq mi) in 2021.

The population of the County of Newell according to its 2020 municipal census is 7,502.

In the 2016 Census of Population conducted by Statistics Canada, the County of Newell had a population of 7,524 living in 2,412 of its 2,627 total private dwellings, a 5.4% change from its 2011 population of 7,138. With a land area of 5,904.67 km^{2} (2,279.81 sq mi), it had a population density of 1.3/km^{2} (3.3/sq mi) in 2016.

== See also ==
- List of communities in Alberta
- List of municipal districts in Alberta
