= Brooks Public Library =

Coordinates: 50.5652°N 111.9028°W

- Location: Brooks, Alberta, Canada
- Established: 1951

Collection
- Size: 52,780 (2009)

Access and use
- Access requirements: Applicants must live in the City of Brooks or the County of Newell
- Circulation: 121,638 (2009)
- Population served: 23,430 (2011)

Other information
- Budget: $350,414 CAD (2009)
- Website: brooks.shortgrass.ca

The Brooks Public Library is a public library located in Brooks, Alberta, Canada and is a part of the Shortgrass Library System and The Alberta Library (TAL). Established in 1951, the library serves residents of the City of Brooks and the County of Newell. In 2010, the library was awarded the Government of Alberta Municipal Affairs Minister's Award for Excellence in Public Library Service.

== Overview ==
=== Services ===
The Brooks Public Library has many programs and services available to the community, including early literacy programs, access to photocopying, laminating, and videoconferencing equipment. Computers with free internet access are available to the public at no cost. Borrowing privileges may be purchased at the library for a fee of $10.00 a year for an adult membership (18 years and older). Borrowing privileges for children ages 17 years and under are free. Applicants wishing to purchase a borrower membership must provide a piece of photo identification and proof of residency in order to qualify for the privilege. The library also provides access to its collection online. In addition to searching the catalogue, the Brooks Public Library website allows users to place a hold on items within the Shortgrass Library System.

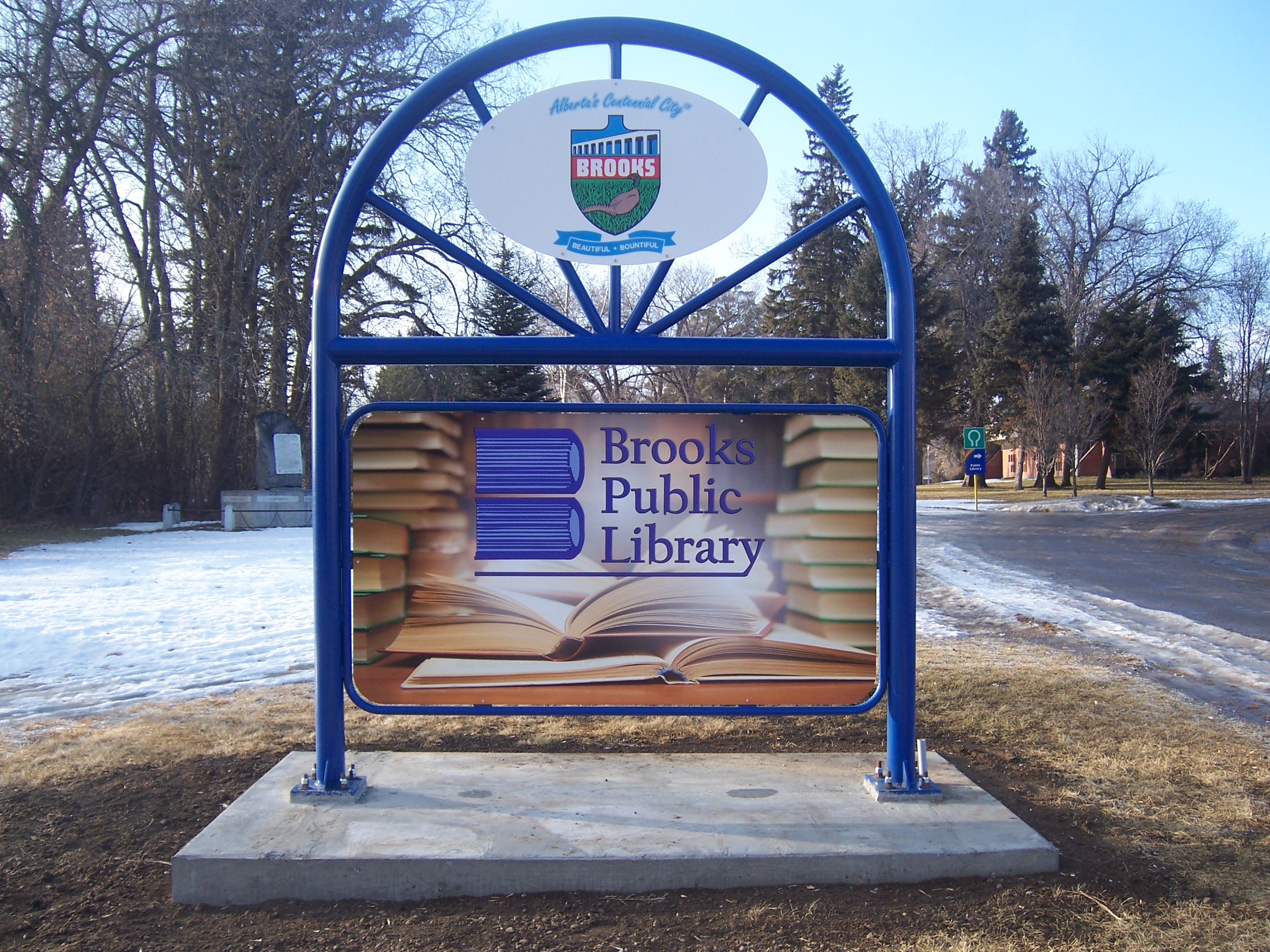
The Brooks Public Library road sign. 2010.

=== Collections ===
The library's collection is approximately 52,780 items including books, e-books, e-audio, talking books, music, movies and periodicals. A circulating collection of books in a variety of languages are also available from the library. Library borrowers can also request books in different languages through the interlibrary loan process.

==== Notable special collections ====
- The Scammell Collection

The Scammell Collection is collection of wildlife, big game, hunting, fishing, fly-tying, and gun repair books. It was made possible by local freelance writer, photographer and lecturer, Robert Scammell.

- Library to Go

Library to Go is a collection of eBooks and Audiobooks powered by OverDrive. The collection is available to all Shortgrass Library System member libraries and their borrowers.

- ESL Fiction

ESL Fiction is a collection of easy reader books for adult emergent readers.

=== Programs ===
The library offers a variety of programs for all members of the community including early literacy programs for children, the TD Summer Reading Program, programming for teens, adult education programs, and programming for new Canadians. The library also offers videoconference programming through its membership with the RISE Network (originally the Rural Information Services initiativE).

==== Annual events ====
- Alberta Culture Days

During the month of September the Brooks Public Library celebrates Alberta Arts Days. Created by the Province of Alberta in 2009, events often include talks with local artisans, a gallery exhibit, craft workshops, and dance, music, and drama demonstrations.

== History ==
=== 1940 to 1950 ===
While the idea of a public library had been talked about by the residents of Brooks, no serious discussions were held by any groups until 1949. At the December 1949 meeting of the Junior Chamber of Commerce (the Jaycees), Misters Yoshito (Winky) Kimura, Roy McNair, and Ed Jahraus presented a preliminary report on the feasibility of creating a local library. The Restroom Society (a local service club) also expressed an interest in incorporating a reading room and library with its own building which was to be built in 1950. A committee was formed, and general meetings were held to convince the public of the value of a community public library. On April 18, 1951 the first Brooks Public Library Board was formed.

=== 1951 to 1966 ===
The Brooks Public Library opened its doors for the first time on March 10, 1951. Established with the fundraising efforts of the Jaycees, the library initially had a budget of $300.00. The library was located in the basement of the County Rest Room. The library had a starting collection of 2000 books, half of which were supplied by community members while the remaining 1000 were donated by the Medicine Hat Public Library. George Bolton and his wife Margaret were hired to be the caretakers of the Rest Room building, and Mollie Gray, Fay Marcy, and Ellen Martin volunteered their time to act as librarians. The Brooks Public Library received a certification of incorporation on April 23, 1957, providing the Brooks Library Board with the authority to act as a corporate body. A few years later, the town of Brooks enacted Bylaw No. 470 which officially established Brooks Public Library as the town's municipal library.

=== 1967 to 1992 ===
On February 2, 1967, Brooks Public Library opened in its second location under the supervision of Head Librarian Orelee Grosfield. The new building was the former Clancy School, which had previously been used as a health unit and a Scout Hall.

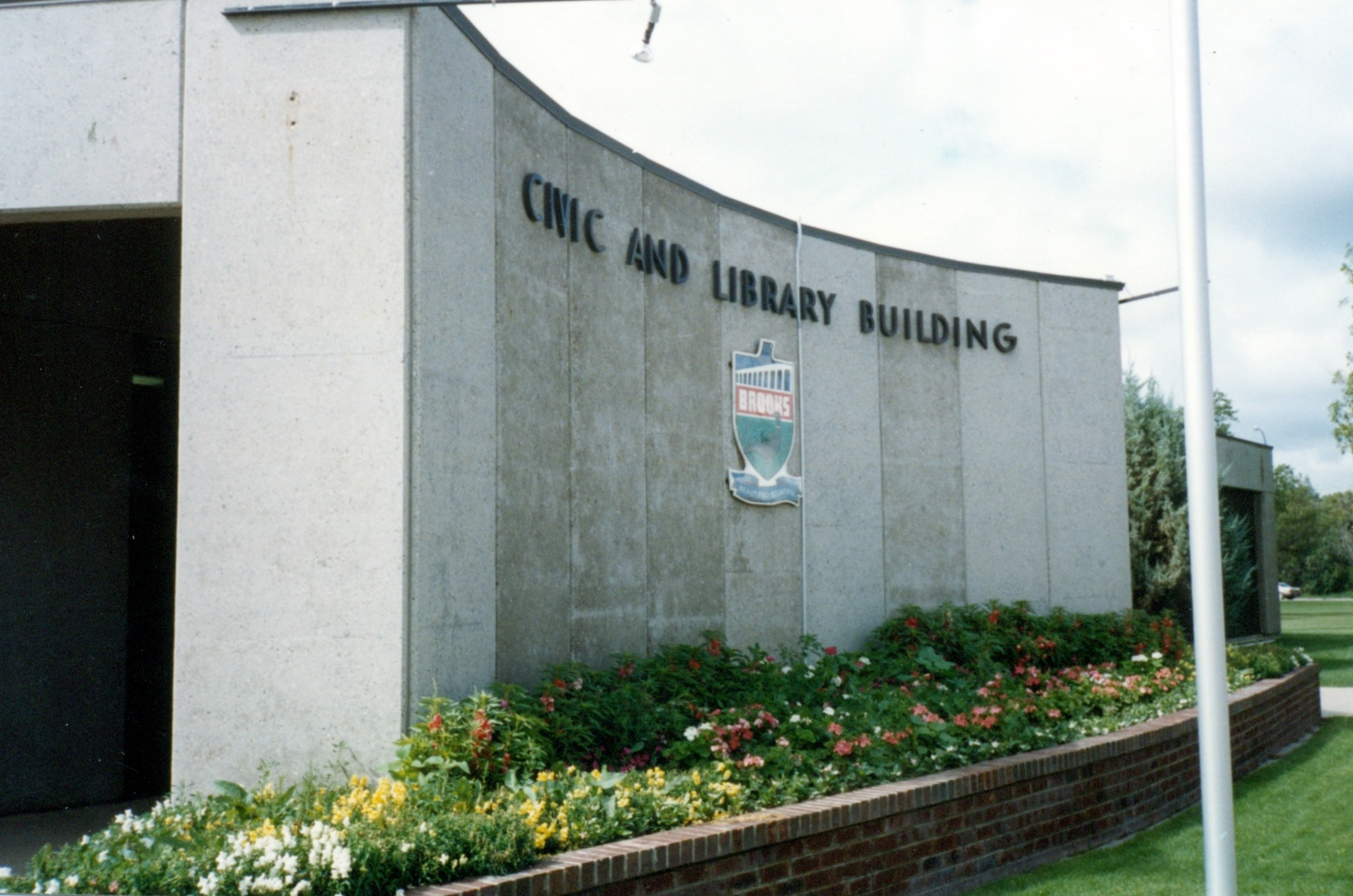
The Brooks Public Library in its third location at the newly constructed Brooks Civic and Library Building. 1974

On August 1, 1974, the library moved a third time into the newly constructed Town Civic Building. At this time, the library had a collection of 8,000 books and 2,600 registered patrons. Membership was free to residents of Brooks and non-residents paid a fee of only $5.00. Patrons were, however, limited in the number of books that they could take out: only four items were allowed per patron. Overdue items cost $0.05 per day to a maximum of $2.00 per book. By 1980, the Town and County had a combined population of 14,850 people and 6,179 of those people had library memberships. In 1988, the municipalities of Brooks, Medicine Hat, Redcliff, Foremost, Bow Island, and the County of 40 Mile formed the Shortgrass Library System (SLS). The municipality of Brooks put in a bid to have Brooks become the home of the future SLS Headquarters, but after much deliberation Medicine Hat was chosen instead with Medicine Hat Public Library established as the SLS resource centre. At this time, non-resident memberships increased to $35.00 per individual and $50.00 per family, with the cost being set by the Shortgrass Library System. Also in 1988, the Brooks Library Foundation was formed to raise funds for a library expansion. Cramped quarters in the Town Civic Building meant that the library staff members were using Town Council chambers as a makeshift programming room and there was no room for expansion of the collection.

=== 1993 to present ===
In 1993, Brooks Public Library moved to the former Eastern Irrigation District (EID) office building in Evergreen Park. A total of $300,000.00 had been raised by the Brooks Library Foundation to help facilitate the move including renovations. The new building increased square footage from 5,000 to 8,000. The grand opening took place on June 30, 1993. In the early 1990s, provincial funding to libraries decreased and municipal funding was frozen by the town of Brooks. In 1994, the Brooks Library Board made the decision to begin charging $12.00 for individual memberships. A few years later, a family membership fee was added at a price of $18.00. The next few years saw a rapid increase in the use of the library's computers and Internet services. The establishment of the Alberta SuperNet in 2005, a service that provided all Alberta public libraries with high speed Internet, added to the demand for the libraries' computer services. Programming also developed rapidly at this time, particularly in 2003 with the development of the annual Medieval Faire. In 2003, Alcoma Community Library, Bassano Memorial Library, and Rolling Hills Public Library joined the Shortgrass Library system. Non-resident fees were again increased by the Shortgrass Library System, jumping to $60.00 for an individual and $80.00 for a family membership. At this time, The Alberta Library (TAL) was also developed. Brooks Public Library joined The Alberta Library initiative, allowing their patrons to apply for TAL cards that could be used at libraries across the province. By 2006 the City and County had a combined population of 22,452 people [7] and roughly 1,900 of those people had Brooks Public Library memberships. In 2008 the Brooks Library Board made the decision to raise the price of memberships to $15.00 for individual memberships and $20.00 to family memberships. Overdue items at this time cost $0.25 per day for all adult and young adult materials, and $0.10 a day for all children's material to a maximum of $5.00 per user. In 2009 the library transferred management of the Medieval Faire over to an independent volunteer governing body. In that same year the library's board was honoured the Alberta Association of Trustees Award of Excellence. In 2010 the library was honoured again, this time with the Government of Alberta Municipal Affairs Minister's Award for Excellence in Public Library Service. In 2014 the City of Brooks announced funding to build a new library building at the Lakeside Leisure Centre.

== Head Librarians/Library Managers ==
- 1951-1953: Mollie Gray, Fay Marcy, Ellen Martin (volunteers)
- 1953-1961: Margaret Bolton
- 1962-1965: Alexina Mary (Robbie) Best
- 1966-1968: Orelee Grosfield
- 1969: Eileen Granlin
- 1970-1999: Karen Armbruster
- 2000: Laura Taylor
- 2000-2006: Julia Reinhart
- 2006–2012: Shannon Vossepoel
- 2012-2014: Sarah McCormack
- 2014-2015: George Hawtin
- 2015–present: Lisa Patton

== Brooks Public Library Board ==
The Brooks Public Library is governed by a board of trustees. The board is composed of up to ten citizen members, including one County of Newell representative, and one appointed Brooks City council representative. Prospective board members must apply for a seat and have their application approved by both the Board of Trustees and the Brooks City Council. Board members may serve for up to three terms, each term lasting three years.

== Honours and awards ==
- Government of Alberta Municipal Affairs Minister's Award for Excellence in Public Library Service (2010)
- Alberta Association of Library Trustees Award of Excellence (2009)
