= Canada's Stonehenge =

Book by Gordon R. Freeman

Canada's Stonehenge: Astounding Archaeological Discoveries in Canada, England, and Wales
- Cover
- Author: Gordon Freeman
- Language: English
- Subject: Majorville Cairn and Medicine Wheel site
- Publisher: Kingsley Publishing
- Publication date: 2009
- Publication place: Canada
- Media type: Print
- Pages: 312
- ISBN: 978-0978452612

Canada's Stonehenge: Astounding Archaeological Discoveries in Canada, England, and Wales is a 2009 self-published book by retired chemistry professor Gordon Freeman, in which the author claims that the Majorville Cairn and Medicine Wheel site, located south of Bassano, Alberta is actually a precise 5,000-year-old calendar. He also discusses Stonehenge, which he believes was also a calendar. Gordon Freeman has no training as an archaeologist, and this work was performed outside of his professional scope of practice as a chemist.

== The archeological site ==
This structure is known by archaeologists as a medicine wheel dated to 3200 BCE (5200 years ago) by careful stratification of known artifact types.

Medicine wheels are sited throughout the northern United States and southern Canada, specifically South Dakota, Wyoming, Montana, Alberta, and Saskatchewan. Most medicine wheels follow the basic pattern of having a center of stone, and surrounding that is an outer ring of stones with "spokes" (lines of rocks) radiating from the center to the four directions (East, South, West, and North). Some medicine wheels have many additional spokes in between the cardinal-aligned spokes.

== Freeman's interpretation ==
In his book, Gordon Freeman challenged the evidence-based interpretation based on the discipline of archaeology, stating that it is actually a 26 square-kilometer stone calendar that marks the changing seasons better than our modern calendar. Freeman argues that the 28 rays of the medicine wheel show that it is a lunar calendar.

Unlike Stonehenge, which is constructed of extremely large stones (megaliths), the Majorville site is constructed of small piles of rocks (cairns) which Freeman says are patterned over an extremely large area. He describes it as a complex, spider-web-like pattern of stones extending over an area of about thirty square kilometres. He views the hilltop centrepiece of the site as a sunburst image made of stones. Freeman believed that those rocks and rock piles were "highly engineered," and could not be natural. He claims to have spent 28 years photographing the site at different times of the year and looking for astronomical alignments.

== Academic reaction ==
It has been noted, however, that the author engages in "speculation that treads close to fiction", often using conditional phrases "such as perhaps, presumably, seems to be, and might have been".

University of Alberta archaeologist Jack Ives is cautious about accepting Freeman's ideas. He notes that as the area is an ancient glacial moraine "[y]ou have to be very careful about what you line up". However, he did agree that the radial lines "may certainly reflect solstices and equinoxes. How much more sophisticated beyond that has been a subject of debate".

Freeman is known for his heterodox writings that have been widely characterized as sexist. In 1990, Freeman published a paper in the Canadian Journal of Physics entitled "Kinetics of non homogenous processes in human society: unethical behaviour and societal chaos" in which he argued - without evidence - that “women who work outside the home contribute to the moral degeneration of their children.” This article was not retracted until 2020. In its retraction statement, the journal notes that "Information was gathered in an unethical and unscientific manner, data are incomplete, and the conclusions are unsupported."
