= Medicine Hat Public Library =

Municipal library in Alberta, Canada

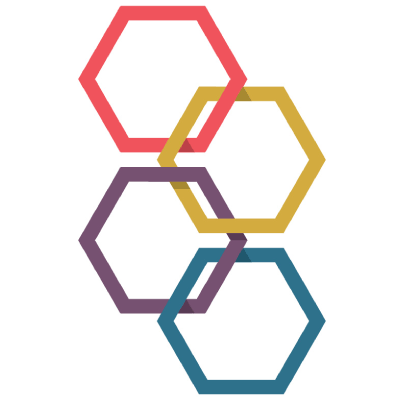

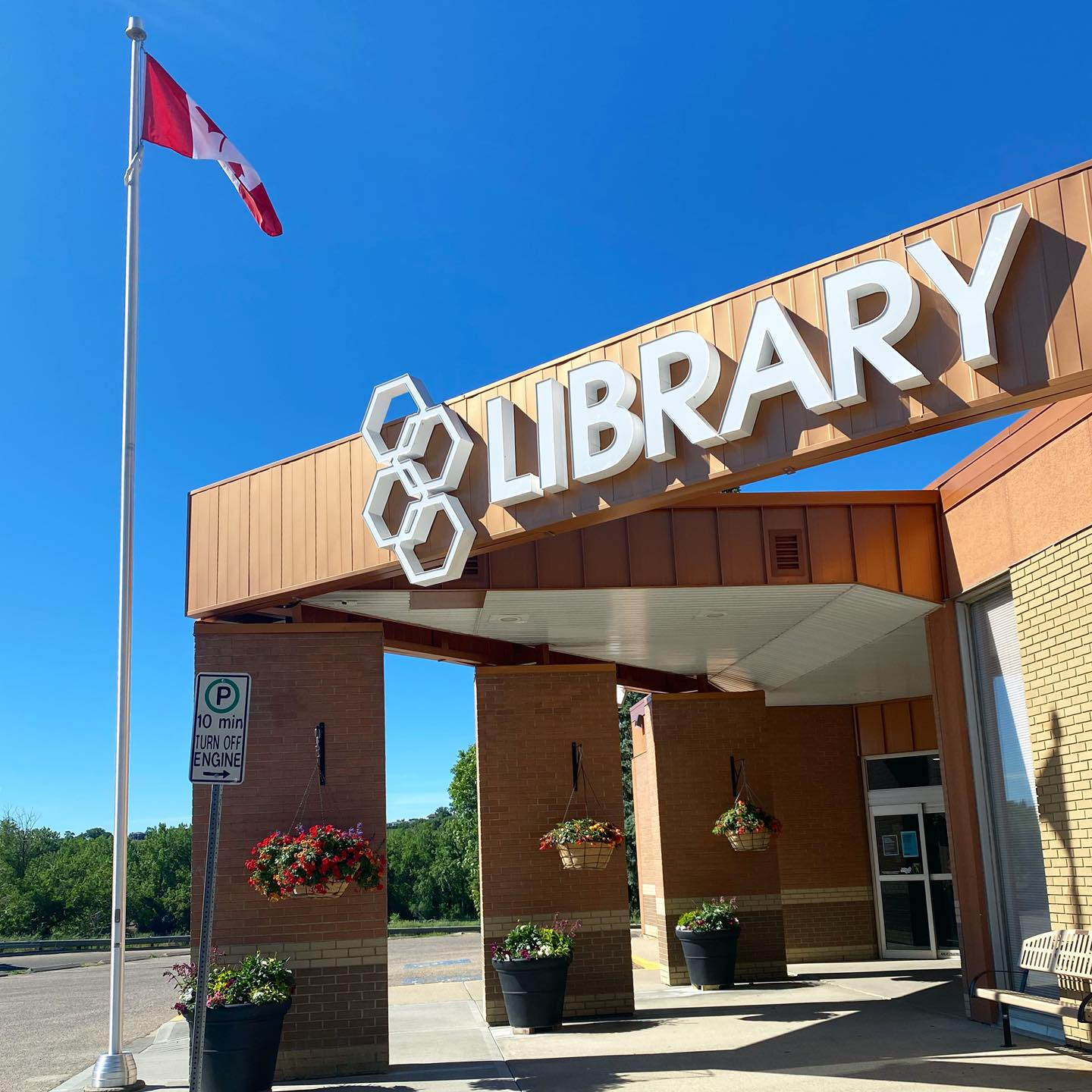
- Medicine Hat Public Library
- 50.04059°N 110.68096°W
- Location: Medicine Hat, Alberta
- Established: 1915
- Branches: 1

Collection
- Items collected: Books, eBooks, audiobooks, movies, music, video games, magazines, newspapers, online learning classes, study help, Ancestry, Consumer Reports

Other information
- Director: Ken Feser
- Employees: 40
- Website: Medicine Hat Public Library

Medicine Hat Public Library (MHPL) is a public library located in Medicine Hat, Alberta, Canada. It overlooks the beautiful South Saskatchewan River, on Treaty 7, Treaty 4, and Métis Nation Region 3 territory. MHPL is a member of the Shortgrass Library System and The Alberta Library.

The library is located in Medicine Hat's downtown core, across the street from the Esplanade Arts and Heritage Centre and next to the Court of King’s Bench on First Street S.E.

== General information ==
The dual-level facility features a children’s library, dedicated young adult section, adult fiction, movies, music and audiobooks on the upper level. The main checkout, self-checkout kiosks and the Information & Memberships counter are located on this level as well.

The lower level is home to the reference collection, adult non-fiction, periodicals, microfilm readers and public computer terminals. The 150-seat theatre and both the Honor Currie and Legion meeting rooms and Training Room are also found on this level.

In 2015 the Medicine Hat Public Library celebrated 100 years of service in Medicine Hat. To recognize the significance of the library to the community of Medicine Hat, Mayor Ted Clugston declared November 21 as "MHPL Day."

== Partnerships ==
Medicine Hat Public Library is a member of "The Alberta Library", a province-wide system that allows access to material from every member library in Alberta.

== Energy conservation ==
The City of Medicine Hat installed a one kilowatt solar electric system on the roof of the library during the summer of 2006. The building now draws part of its electricity from the solar panel. Power generation from the 1 kW solar panel array is performing as expected. The historical measurements of the solar array are within expectations consistent with theoretical calculations used in methods provided by the National Renewable Energy Laboratory. In the first 5 years of operation, the solar array generated 5-6 thousand kWh. Not considering upfront capital and installation costs, the total associated electrical energy consumption savings are approximately $600–800 over the same time period. The amount of electricity generated can also be viewed in real time. The project cost approximately $15k.

== Statistics 2015 ==
Library In-person Visits: 247,894
Items Borrowed: 210,409 items circulated 527,159 times
Library Members: 14,809
Programs: 654
Program Participants: 19,149
Public Internet Use: 23,907 sessions
Reference questions Answered: 5,996
Volunteers: 315 donated 1,433 hours
