= Brooks, Alberta =

Brooks
- City
- City of Brooks
- Aerial view of downtown Brooks (2026)

- Nickname: Alberta's Centennial City
- Motto: Beautiful and Bountiful
- City boundaries

- Location in Alberta Location in Canada Location in the County of Newell
- Coordinates: 50°33′51″N 111°53′56″W
- Country: Canada
- Province: Alberta
- Region: Southern Alberta
- Planning region: South Saskatchewan
- Municipal district: County of Newell
- Incorporated
  - Village: July 14, 1910
  - Town: September 8, 1911
  - City: September 1, 2005

Government
  - Mayor: Norm Gerestein
  - Governing body: Brooks City Council: Mara Nesbitt; Chad Falkenberg; Jackie Johnson; Ann-Marie Philipsen; Mike Regner; Mohammed Idriss
  - CAO: Doug Lagore
  - MP: David Bexte (Cons – Bow River)
  - MLA: Danielle Smith (UCP – Brooks-Medicine Hat)

Area (2021)
  - Land: 18.21 km^{2} (7.03 sq mi)
- Elevation: 760 m (2,490 ft)

Population (2021)
  - Total: 14,924
  - Density: 819.8/km^{2} (2,123/sq mi)
  - Municipal census (2015): 14,185
  - Estimate (2020): 15,805
- Time zone: UTC−06:00 (Alberta Time)
- Forward sortation area: T1R
- Area codes: 403, 587, 825, 368
- Highways: Highway 1 Highway 36
- Railways: Canadian Pacific Kansas City
- Website: brooks.ca

Brooks is a city in southeast Alberta, Canada in the County of Newell. It is on Highway 1 (Trans-Canada Highway) and the Canadian Pacific Kansas City railway, approximately 186 km (116 mi) southeast of Calgary, and 110 km (68 mi) northwest of Medicine Hat. The city has an elevation of 760 m (2,490 ft).

== History ==
The area that is now Brooks was used as a bison-hunting ground for the Blackfoot and Crow tribes. After Treaty 7 was signed in 1877, homesteaders took advantage of the Dominion Lands Act to move into the area to begin farming. Before 1904, the area still did not have a name. Through a contest sponsored by the Postmaster General, the area was named after Noel Edgell Brooks (1865–1926), a Canadian Pacific Railway Divisional Engineer from Calgary.

Brooks was incorporated as a village on July 14, 1910, and then as a town on September 8, 1911. Its population in the 1911 Census of Canada was 486.

In the 1996 Census, the population of Brooks reached 10,093 making it eligible for city status. Brooks incorporated as a city on September 1, 2005 when its official population was 11,604.

In 2010, Brooks celebrated the centennial of its incorporation as a village in 1910.

== Demographics ==
Federal census population history
| Year | Pop. | ±% |
|---|---|---|
| 1911 | 486 | — |
| 1916 | 290 | −40.3% |
| 1921 | 499 | +72.1% |
| 1926 | 511 | +2.4% |
| 1931 | 708 | +38.6% |
| 1936 | 697 | −1.6% |
| 1941 | 888 | +27.4% |
| 1946 | 1,091 | +22.9% |
| 1951 | 1,648 | +51.1% |
| 1956 | 2,320 | +40.8% |
| 1961 | 2,827 | +21.9% |
| 1966 | 3,354 | +18.6% |
| 1971 | 3,986 | +18.8% |
| 1976 | 6,339 | +59.0% |
| 1981 | 9,421 | +48.6% |
| 1986 | 9,464 | +0.5% |
| 1991 | 9,433 | −0.3% |
| 1996 | 10,093 | +7.0% |
| 2001 | 11,604 | +15.0% |
| 2006 | 12,498 | +7.7% |
| 2011 | 13,676 | +9.4% |
| 2016 | 14,451 | +5.7% |
| 2021 | 14,924 | +3.3% |
Source: Statistics Canada

In the 2021 Census of Population conducted by Statistics Canada, the City of Brooks had a population of 14,924 living in 5,140 of its 5,489 total private dwellings, a change of 3.3% from its 2016 population of 14,451. With a land area of 18.21 km^{2} (7.03 sq mi), it had a population density of 819.5/km^{2} (2,122.6/sq mi) in 2021.

In the 2016 Census of Population conducted by Statistics Canada, the City of Brooks had a population of 14,451 living in 5,046 of its 5,412 total private dwellings, a change of 5.7% from its 2011 population of 13,676. With a land area of 18.59 km^{2} (7.18 sq mi), it had a population density of 777.4/km^{2} (2,013.3/sq mi) in 2016.

The population of the City of Brooks according to its 2015 municipal census is 14,185, a change of 4.4% from its 2007 municipal census population of 13,581.

A multicultural community, Brooks has been referred to as "The City of 100 Hellos" as a result of a documentary by Brandy Yanchyk profiling the community's significant immigrant, refugee and temporary foreign worker populations. The documentary was called Brooks – The City of 100 Hellos and was created in 2010 for Omni Television. The community's multicultural character was also the subject of a 2007 National Film Board of Canada documentary, 24 Days in Brooks, directed by Dana Inkster. Brooks has the highest proportion of Black Canadians of any census subdivision in Canada.

Religion in Brooks (2021)
1. Christian (54.7%)
2. No religion (29.5%)
3. Muslim (12.7%)
4. Buddhist (2.00%)
5. Other (1.10%)

Panethnic groups in the City of Brooks (2001−2021)
| Panethnic group | 2021 | | 2016 | | 2011 | | 2006 | | 2001 | |
| Panethnic group | Pop. | % | Pop. | % | Pop. | % | Pop. | % | Pop. | % |
|---|---|---|---|---|---|---|---|---|---|---|
| European (Note: Statistic includes all persons that did not make up part of a visible minority or an indigenous identity.) | 7,190 | 49.11% | 8,265 | 59.06% | 9,275 | 69.61% | 10,045 | 80.39% | 10,455 | 91.43% |
| African | 3,270 | 22.34% | 1,995 | 14.26% | 1,020 | 7.65% | 1,110 | 8.88% | 165 | 1.44% |
| Southeast Asian (Note: Statistic includes total responses of "Filipino" and "Southeast Asian" under visible minority section on census.) | 2,375 | 16.22% | 1,560 | 11.15% | 1,055 | 7.92% | 340 | 2.72% | 140 | 1.22% |
| Latin American | 650 | 4.44% | 600 | 4.29% | 395 | 2.96% | 55 | 0.44% | 35 | 0.31% |
| East Asian (Note: Statistic includes total responses of "Chinese", "Korean", and "Japanese" under visible minority section on census.) | 415 | 2.83% | 365 | 2.61% | 460 | 3.45% | 265 | 2.12% | 110 | 0.96% |
| Indigenous | 345 | 2.36% | 580 | 4.14% | 490 | 3.68% | 310 | 2.48% | 340 | 2.97% |
| South Asian | 205 | 1.4% | 325 | 2.32% | 275 | 2.06% | 175 | 1.4% | 80 | 0.7% |
| Middle Eastern (Note: Statistic includes total responses of "West Asian" and "Arab" under visible minority section on census.) | 90 | 0.61% | 135 | 0.96% | 215 | 1.61% | 135 | 1.08% | 85 | 0.74% |
| Other/Multiracial (Note: Statistic includes total responses of "Visible minority, n.i.e." and "Multiple visible minorities" under visible minority section on census.) | 105 | 0.72% | 170 | 1.21% | 120 | 0.9% | 20 | 0.16% | 30 | 0.26% |
| Total responses | 14,640 | 98.1% | 13,995 | 96.84% | 13,325 | 97.43% | 12,495 | 99.98% | 11,435 | 98.54% |
| Total population | 14,924 | 100% | 14,451 | 100% | 13,676 | 100% | 12,498 | 100% | 11,604 | 100% |
Note: Totals greater than 100% due to multiple origin responses

== Geography ==
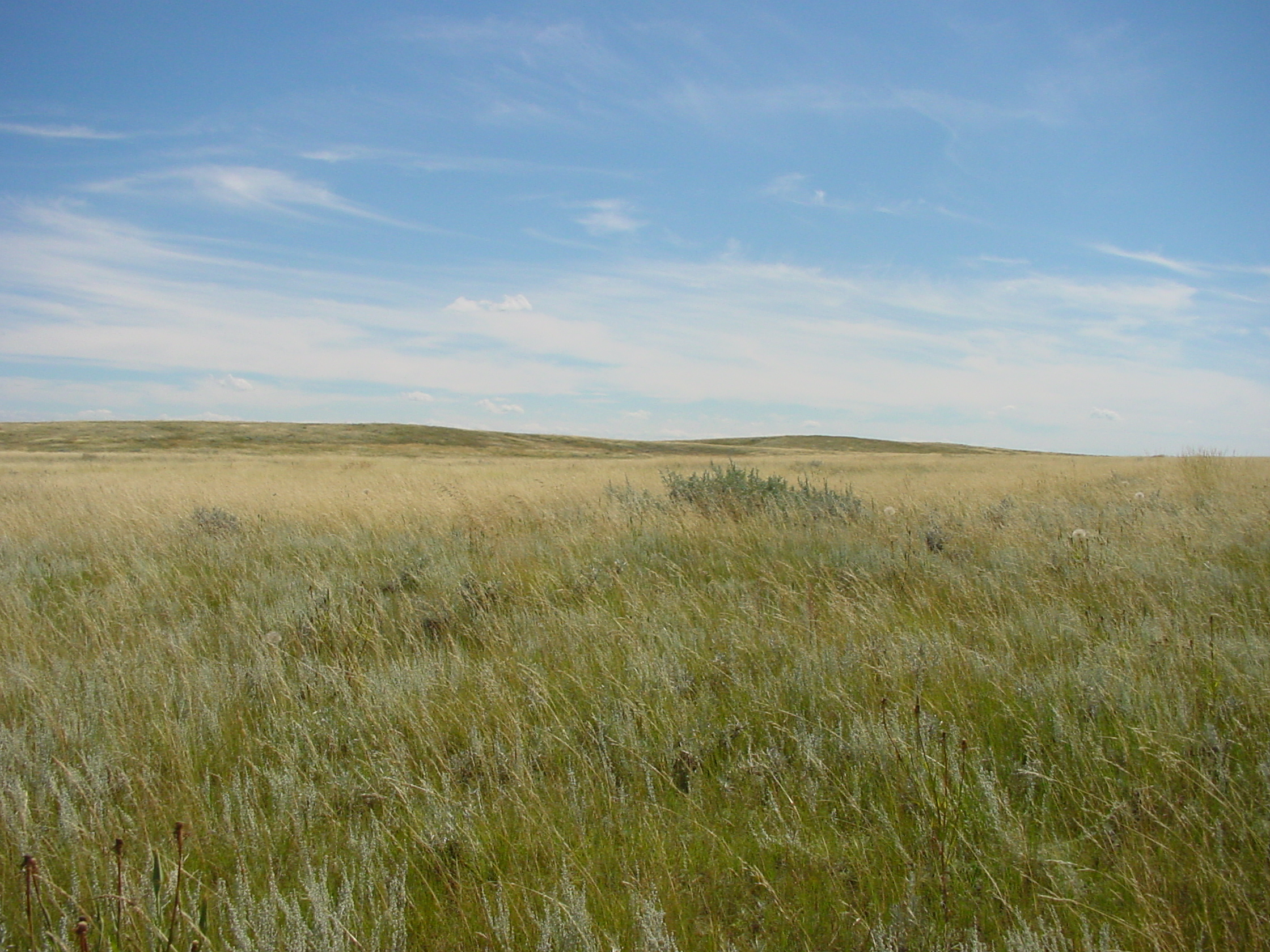
Prairie southwest of Brooks

Brooks is located in the Grassland Natural Region of Alberta. The area surrounding Brooks is dry mixed grass/shortgrass prairie.

=== Climate ===
Located in the steppe region known as the Palliser's Triangle, Brooks has a semi-arid climate (Köppen climate classification BSk). Winters are quite dry and cold, with little snowfall compared to the rest of Canada. Chinook winds, though less common than in areas west and especially southwest of Brooks, are still common and ameliorate the cold winter temperatures temporarily when they pass over. Wide diurnal temperature ranges are regular, due to the aridity and moderately high elevation. Low humidity is prevalent throughout the year. Most of the relatively scant annual precipitation occurs in late spring and summer, often in the form of thunderstorms. On average, the coldest month is January, with an average temperature of −9.5 °C (14.9 °F) while the warmest is July, with an average temperature of 19.0 °C (66.2 °F). The driest month is February, with an average monthly precipitation of 6.7 mm (0.26 in), while the wettest month is June, with an average of 75.6 mm (2.98 in). Annual precipitation is low, with an average of 299.5 mm (11.79 in).

Climate data for Brooks, 1991–2020 normals, extremes 1912–present
| Month | Jan | Feb | Mar | Apr | May | Jun | Jul | Aug | Sep | Oct | Nov | Dec | Year |
|---|---|---|---|---|---|---|---|---|---|---|---|---|---|
| Record high humidex | 14.6 | 17.8 | 26.4 | 29.6 | 33.9 | 39.8 | 41.9 | 39.6 | 36.0 | 31.0 | 24.5 | 16.0 | 41.9 |
| Record high °C (°F) | 17.8 (64.0) | 18.5 (65.3) | 26.6 (79.9) | 31.1 (88.0) | 35.6 (96.1) | 37.2 (99.0) | 40.0 (104.0) | 38.9 (102.0) | 36.1 (97.0) | 33.3 (91.9) | 24.4 (75.9) | 20.0 (68.0) | 40.0 (104.0) |
| Mean daily maximum °C (°F) | −3.4 (25.9) | −0.5 (31.1) | 4.7 (40.5) | 12.8 (55.0) | 18.9 (66.0) | 22.6 (72.7) | 26.9 (80.4) | 26.1 (79.0) | 20.7 (69.3) | 12.9 (55.2) | 3.9 (39.0) | −2.7 (27.1) | 11.9 (53.4) |
| Daily mean °C (°F) | −9.5 (14.9) | −7.0 (19.4) | −1.9 (28.6) | 5.4 (41.7) | 11.3 (52.3) | 15.6 (60.1) | 19.0 (66.2) | 18.1 (64.6) | 12.8 (55.0) | 5.5 (41.9) | −2.5 (27.5) | −8.8 (16.2) | 4.8 (40.7) |
| Mean daily minimum °C (°F) | −15.7 (3.7) | −13.4 (7.9) | −8.5 (16.7) | −2.2 (28.0) | 3.6 (38.5) | 8.5 (47.3) | 11.1 (52.0) | 9.9 (49.8) | 4.8 (40.6) | −1.9 (28.6) | −8.8 (16.2) | −14.8 (5.4) | −2.3 (27.9) |
| Record low °C (°F) | −46.7 (−52.1) | −43.9 (−47.0) | −40.6 (−41.1) | −25.0 (−13.0) | −11.1 (12.0) | −2.2 (28.0) | 1.7 (35.1) | −1.1 (30.0) | −11.1 (12.0) | −24.4 (−11.9) | −36.1 (−33.0) | −47.2 (−53.0) | −47.2 (−53.0) |
| Record low wind chill | −49.2 | −50.5 | −42.8 | −25.8 | −14.1 | −3.6 | 0.0 | 0.0 | −10.8 | −25.3 | −39.0 | −51.6 | −51.6 |
| Average precipitation mm (inches) | 10.6 (0.42) | 6.7 (0.26) | 15.9 (0.63) | 20.4 (0.80) | 36.5 (1.44) | 75.6 (2.98) | 32.4 (1.28) | 32.7 (1.29) | 28.7 (1.13) | 14.1 (0.56) | 14.6 (0.57) | 11.3 (0.44) | 299.5 (11.8) |
| Average rainfall mm (inches) | 0.4 (0.02) | 0.3 (0.01) | 3.3 (0.13) | 17.1 (0.67) | 38.9 (1.53) | 64.5 (2.54) | 44.9 (1.77) | 34.7 (1.37) | 34.6 (1.36) | 10.4 (0.41) | 2.9 (0.11) | 0.8 (0.03) | 252.8 (9.95) |
| Average snowfall cm (inches) | 14.1 (5.6) | 11.7 (4.6) | 22.0 (8.7) | 5.9 (2.3) | 2.1 (0.8) | 0.0 (0.0) | 0.0 (0.0) | 0.7 (0.3) | 0.5 (0.2) | 6.6 (2.6) | 16.7 (6.6) | 14.5 (5.7) | 94.8 (37.4) |
| Average precipitation days (≥ 0.2 mm) | 6.4 | 5.0 | 8.1 | 7.2 | 10.2 | 12.8 | 8.4 | 9.0 | 8.0 | 6.9 | 7.3 | 7.2 | 96.5 |
| Average rainy days (≥ 0.2 mm) | 0.18 | 0.18 | 2.2 | 5.6 | 9.6 | 11.9 | 9.9 | 8.4 | 8.0 | 4.7 | 1.6 | 0.57 | 62.8 |
| Average snowy days (≥ 0.2 cm) | 5.0 | 4.2 | 5.8 | 1.6 | 0.55 | 0.0 | 0.0 | 0.1 | 0.19 | 1.5 | 5.0 | 5.1 | 29.0 |
| Average relative humidity (%) (at 3pm) | 69.6 | 63.9 | 54.7 | 40.4 | 38.8 | 45.2 | 39.4 | 38.9 | 41.4 | 47.3 | 61.5 | 69.6 | 50.9 |
| Mean monthly sunshine hours | 91.6 | 114.9 | 158.3 | 215.1 | 266.3 | 290.2 | 338.8 | 302.1 | 200.9 | 169.7 | 105.8 | 75.1 | 2,328.9 |
| Percentage possible sunshine | 34.7 | 41.1 | 43.1 | 52.1 | 55.6 | 59.1 | 68.4 | 67.1 | 52.8 | 50.8 | 39.0 | 30.0 | 49.5 |
Source: Environment Canada(rain/rain days, snow/snow days 1981–2010) (Sunshine 1961–1990)

== Economy ==
The base of the economy of the City of Brooks is energy (oil and gas) and agriculture, with other sectors including metal manufacturing, food processing and construction. It is also a retail and service centre for the surrounding area.

Canada’s second largest beef-processing facility, owned by JBS Canada, is located in Brooks and ships meat across the country and internationally. In 2012, while the plant was owned by XL Foods, it released meat contaminated with E. coli, and was shut down for a month. The plant has over 2000 employees.

== Attractions ==
The JBS Leisure Centre is the area's main recreation centre. It includes one arena, a curling rink, an aquatic centre with a waterslide and wave pool, a gymnasium, a fitness centre, and multipurpose rooms. The complex was renovated in 2005 and again in 2016. Now the Brooks Public Library is within the JBS Leisure Centre.

In 2010, the Duke of Sutherland Park was redeveloped. It features baseball diamonds, a soccer field, a playground and a 3,200 ft^{2} (300 m^{2}) waterpark with spray features for toddlers and a play structure for older children.

Also in 2010, the Centennial Regional Arena was completed after nearly a decade of planning and 18 months of construction. The multi-purpose facility seats 1,704 people. It includes corporate boxes, a running track, concessions, and a 200 ft × 85 ft (61 m × 26 m) surface. The arena is home to several user groups, including the Brooks Bandits. The arena also hosted the 2019 National Junior A Championship.

There are three provincial parks in the area: Dinosaur Provincial Park, a World Heritage Site, to the northeast, Tillebrook Provincial Park to the east and Kinbrook Island Provincial Park to the south. In addition, there are several other recreational sites in the area including the Rolling Hills Reservoir, Crawling Valley Reservoir, and Emerson Bridge.

The Brooks Aqueduct southeast of Brooks was built to transport irrigation water across the Eastern Irrigation District. It spans across a 3.2 km (2.0 mi) valley, about 20 m (66 ft) above the ground.

== Sports ==
Brooks is home to the Brooks Bandits of the British Columbia Junior Hockey League. The ice hockey team was awarded to Brooks in 1998 and embarked on its first season in 2000. They have helped produce current NHL players such as Cale Makar (Colorado Avalanche) and Chad Johnson. The Bandits won the league championship in 2012, 2013, 2016, 2017 and 2019. They won their first national championship (The Royal Bank Cup) in 2013 and repeated again by winning the National Junior A Championship in 2019. They have repeated in 2022 and 2023 after the COVID 19 pandemic suspended two seasons.

There are three football teams in Brooks: from the public schools the Roadrunners, and the Buffalos and the Crusaders from the catholic schools. The teams comprise players from the local junior and senior high schools respectively. The Buffalos represented Brooks at provincial championships in 1989, 1995, 1997, and 2009, winning in the title in its last three appearances. The Roadrunners appeared at provincial championships in 1995, 2004, 2007, 2014, and 2016 . The Crusaders have appeared in the provincial finals three times, 2015, 2016 and 2018, winning in 2018.

Brooks is home to a Western Canadian Baseball League franchise named the Brooks Bombers. They play at Elks Field in the Quad Ball Diamond Complex.

== Government ==
Brooks City Council consists of one mayor and six councillors. In August 2021, former Mayor Barry Morishita stepped down from the position of mayor to run for leadership of the Alberta Party. John Petrie was elected as Mayor in October 2023.

== Education ==
Brooks has three high schools, three junior high schools, five elementary schools, three primary schools, and two alternative schools. The schools are operated by Grasslands Public Schools, Christ the Redeemer School Division (Catholic) and Francosud (Francophone). Brooks also has a satellite campus of Medicine Hat College. The Brooks Public Library was established in 1951.

== Health care ==
Acute medical care is provided at the Brooks Health Centre. The Brooks Health Centre is under the Alberta Health Services which provides health to most of Alberta.

== Media ==
Brooks is served by two radio stations, CIBQ-FM (105.7 Real Country), and CIXF-FM (Boom 101.1). Both stations are owned by Stingray Group.

Brooks has two distinct newspapers. The Brooks Bulletin is published every Tuesday, and has served Brooks and the County of Newell since 1910. It has a weekly circulation of 4,332.

The Weekend Regional is a second paper the Bulletin established in 2004 and it is published on Fridays. As of January 2010, it became a total market coverage product with a weekly circulation of 11,235.

== Notable people ==
- Sheri Forde, TSN Toronto reporter
- Little Miss Higgins, folk and blues singer
- Ryan Peake, a member of rock band Nickelback
- Sherraine Schalm, Olympic fencer
- Harnarayan Singh, NHL broadcaster
- Monte Solberg, former federal cabinet minister, current political columnist for Sun Media
- Richard Summerbell (born 1956), mycologist
- Barry Morishita, former mayor of Brooks.
- Ajou Ajou, current football player for the Indianapolis Colts

== See also ==
- List of cities in Alberta
- List of communities in Alberta
- Canada's Stonehenge
