= Brooks – The City of 100 Hellos =

- Film poster
- Written by: Brandy Yanchyk
- Directed by: Brandy Yanchyk
- Music by: Mark Zagorsky
- Country of origin: Canada
- Original language: English

Production
- Producer: Brandy Yanchyk
- Editor: Sarah Taylor
- Running time: 49 minutes

Original release
- Release: 16 October 2011

Brooks – The City of 100 Hellos is a 2011 Canadian television documentary film.

== Synopsis ==
The 49-minute film, directed by Brandy Yanchyk and produced by Brandy Y Productions, gives a glimpse into the lives of many of the new immigrants, refugees, and temporary foreign workers that have moved to Brooks, Alberta, Canada. It also explores the challenges they face and looks at how long-time residents of Brooks feel about the new immigration in their community. The main attraction for the newcomers is the local meat packing plant owned by XL Foods Lakeside Packers Inc. that employed about 2,000 workers from across the world. The title The City of 100 Hellos comes from assessment that over 100 languages are spoken in Brooks from 60 to 70 countries with many languages and dialects. The film also explores Brooks' 100-year history as it celebrates its centennial anniversary and shows how the demographics are changing. The city incorporated as a village on July 14, 1910.

== Reception ==
CM Magazine wrote a favorable review for the film, stating that "teachers of senior high Canadian history might find it useful to show to students as a contemporary commentary on the impact of immigration, and it can be used in high school sociology courses."

=== Awards ===
- Honorable Mention Award as Best Documentary under 60 minutes at the Commffest Global Community Festival (2011)
- Royal Reel Award for Best Documentary at the Canada International Film Festival (2012, won)
- Honorable Mention Award: Humanitarian Approach at the Montana CINE International Film Festival
