= Axia NetMedia =

Axia NetMedia Corp
- Type: Private
- Industry: Networking & Communication Devices
- Headquarters: Calgary, Alberta, Canada
- Key people: Arthur R. Price
- Number of employees: 200
- Website: www.axia.com

Axia NetMedia designs and operates the wholesale component of several "Open Access" fibre based internet and data networks. Axia operates the Alberta SuperNet and is half owner of Covage networks, developing high speed networks in France. It has also been awarded the tender for the Singapore fibre network as part of the OpenNet consortium with Singapore Telecom, and has placed a bond to allow it to submit a proposal for Australia's National Broadband Network.

Axia had a market cap of just under $160M in October 2014.

== Alberta SuperNet, Canada ==
Axia was a member of the public-private partnership that constructed Alberta SuperNet—a provincial layer 3 network that connects public facilities and rural communities across Alberta. The network's wholesale sales were managed by Axia, while it was built by Bell Canada and owned by the Alberta government.

On June 29, 2018, Service Alberta announced that it had declined to renew its contract with Axia, and that it had reached a multi-year deal with Bell to assume operations of SuperNet. Bell Canada subsequently announced the following Monday that it had agreed to acquire Axia's Alberta assets.

== France - Covage joint venture ==
Covage is a French joint venture between Axia NetMedia and Cube Infrastructure Fund (a €1.1 million Private Equity fund), with direct involvement in 40 regional networks in France and a national backbone (over 9,000 km of fiber deployed). Covage is the leading neutral and independent player in the optic fiber concession business in France.

== Singapore - SingTel joint venture in OpenNet ==
The OpenNet consortium (consisting of Axia NetMedia (30%), Singapore Telecommunications/SingTel (30%), Singapore Press Holdings (25%) and Singapore Power Telemedia (15%)) were awarded Singapore's National Broadband Network passive network tender on September 26, 2008. OpenNet will directly own the fibre links of the proposal, which will reach 60% of the population by 2010 and 95% by 2012, and OpenNet will assume universal service obligations after 2013.

Their proposal creates an open access network with 4 distinct layers of ownership, to separate competitive interests from monopoly aspects of the network. SingTel (the national incumbent) will transfer existing ducts, manholes and exchanges to be used for the NBN into an independent asset company by mid-2011 and sell down its stake in that entity by 2014. The fibre will belong to OpenNet. The electronics will be offered to "operating companies" (Opco licensees) who will operate the electronics—Layers 2 and 3— of the network - and the operating companies will resell to retail providers.

== Australia - National Broadband Network ==
Axia NetMedia submitted a bid to build Australia's National Broadband Network (NBN). The NBN request for proposal involved the design and operation of an open access nationwide network delivering speeds of 12 Mbit/s or higher to 98% of Australia's population. The RFP was terminated by the Australian government on April 7, 2009.
