= Medicine Wheel/Medicine Mountain National Historic Landmark =

Native American ceremonial site in Wyoming, US

- U.S. National Register of Historic Places
- U.S. National Historic Landmark
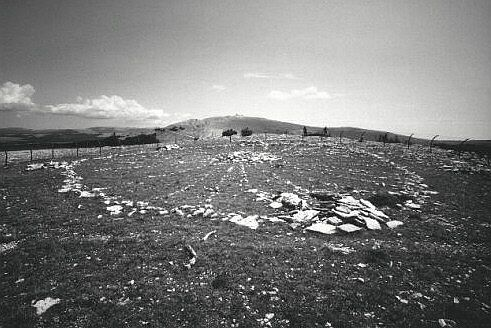
- The Medicine Wheel in Big Horn County, Wyoming, USA

- Location within Wyoming Location within the United States
- Nearest city: Lovell
- Coordinates: 44°49′34″N 107°55′18″W
- NRHP reference No.: 69000184

Significant dates
- Added to NRHP: April 16, 1969
- Designated NHL: August 29, 1970

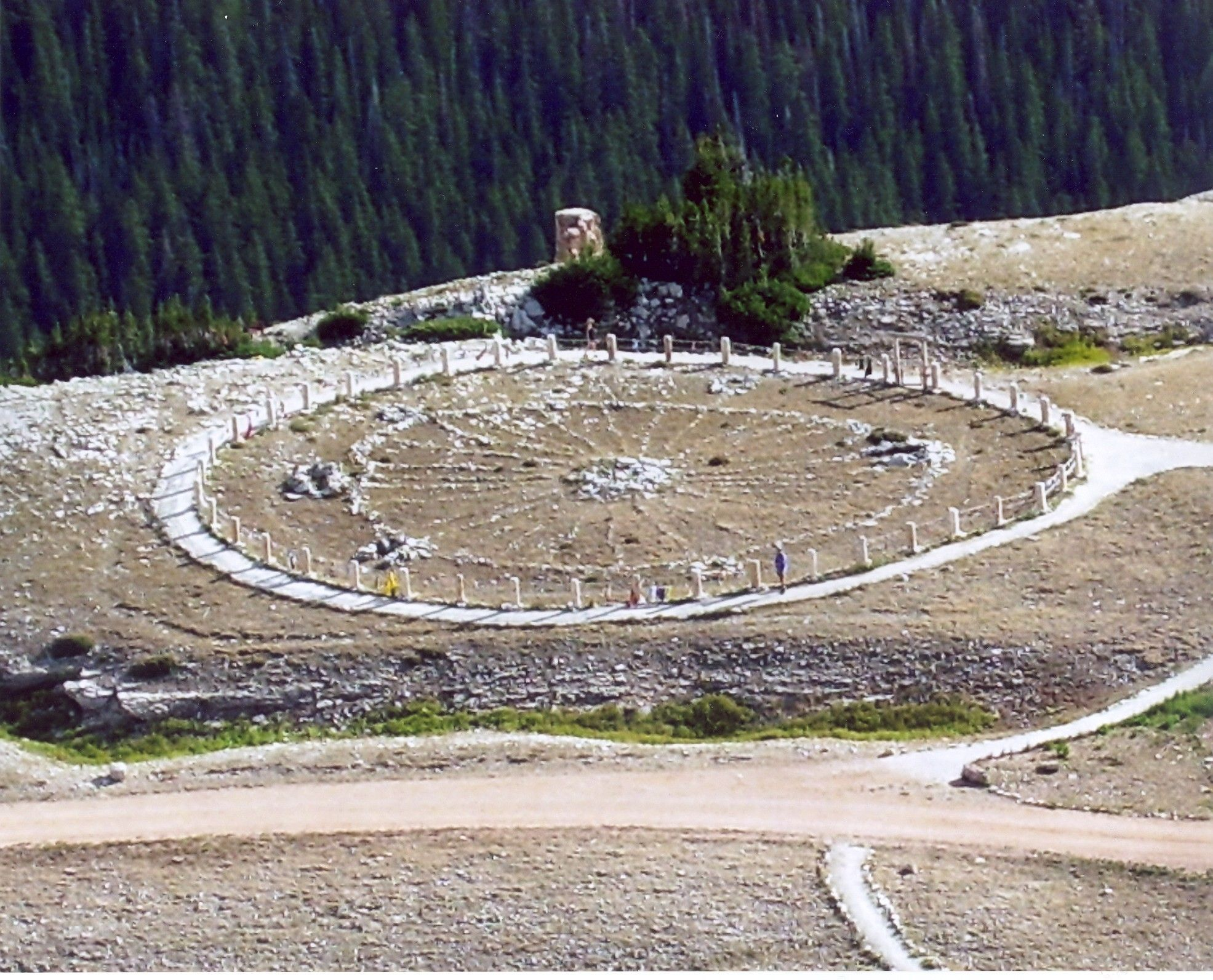
The Medicine Wheel in Bighorn National Forest, Wyoming.

The Medicine Wheel/Medicine Mountain National Historic Landmark (Crow: Annáshisee, lit. 'Large campsite'; formerly known as the Bighorn Medicine Wheel) is a medicine wheel located in the Bighorn National Forest, in the U.S. state of Wyoming.

The Medicine Wheel at Medicine Mountain is a large stone structure made of local white limestone laid upon a bedrock of limestone. It has served as a site of both indigenous ceremonial practice and astronomical study. Gregory Cajete has argued that indigenous knowledge systems do not separate ceremonial and investigative uses of such sites into distinct domains.

The cultural history of the Bighorn Mountains, home to the Big Horn Medicine Wheel, dates back over ten thousand years.

== Cultural use ==
No indigenous peoples have publicly claimed to have built the Big Horn Medicine Wheel. During negotiations to include the Big Horn Medicine Wheel in the registry for National Historic Landmark and Sacred Site status, the Crow stated that the Wheel was already present when they came into the area. However, the Wheel rests within the Crow homeland, an area that the Crow say was given to them by the Creator when No Vitals, a Crow leader (c. 1400–1600), had his vision of stars descending into tobacco blossoms while he fasted and prayed on the highest mountain in the Bighorns (Cloud Peak). Oral history from several indigenous nations holds that the Big Horn Medicine Wheel already existed, having been built by "ancient ancestors" or "people without iron."

The Big Horn Medicine Wheel is a sacred site for many indigenous tribes. Although the Wheel was built high above the Bighorn Basin, and the climb up from the basin requires effort, a wide, deeply cut ancient trail leads directly to the Wheel. In winter, when the modern asphalt road is covered in snow and closed for the season, it is possible to travel by foot up the old trail from Five Springs Campground. Stephen C. Simms of the Chicago Field Museum, upon examining the Wheel in 1903, inferred that the travois trail must have been well-traveled for long periods in the past to acquire its deeply cut edges. The Bighorn Mountains stand high above the hot summers of the basin. In 1887, the Tukudeka elder Aggretta said her people chose to live high in the Bighorns to escape the flies and human conflict.

=== Little People and vision quests ===
The Arapaho call the Big Horn Medicine Wheel Hiieeinoonotii. A detailed account of ceremonial use of the Bighorn Medicine Wheel by the Arapaho was related in 1993 by Paul Moss.

Tom Yellowtail, a Crow elder, told the story of Burnt Face building a medicine wheel in the Bighorn Mountains and receiving help from the Little People. After the Little People healed his face, Burnt Face came down from the Bighorns, rejoined his people, and built what is now called the Fort Smith Wheel. This Wheel has similar stellar and solar alignments to the Big Horn Medicine Wheel, adjusted for landscape changes and latitude.

== Measurements ==
The structure is located at an altitude of 9,642 feet (2,939 m), near the summit of Medicine Mountain. It is a pre-Columbian structure, built from roughly loaf-sized stones gathered from the surrounding area. The structure consists of a circular rim, 80 feet (24.4 m) in diameter, 28 spokes extending from the rim to the center, and a series of seven stone circles (cairns). Cairn O is at the center of the structure and is about 10 feet (3.0 m) in diameter. Cairns A–F are at or near the rim and are considerably smaller.

== Astronomical alignments ==
The Big Horn Medicine Wheel is one of four or five astronomically complex wheels known to exist in the Rocky Mountain region. It is of a type termed Subgroup 6: "A prominent central stone cairn surrounded by a stone ring. Two or more interior stone lines connect the stone ring to the cairn" (John Brumley). Another of this Subgroup type is the Majorville Wheel in Alberta, Canada. The Majorville Wheel, which has a similarly complex design, has been dated archaeologically to 3200 BC. Smaller, less complex wheels may have astronomical significance, such as solstice alignments and east-west orientations. The larger complex wheels are capable of tracking several different cosmic cycles, including the precession of the equinoxes, the Moon's phases, lunar and solar eclipse cycles, and planets' orbital cycles. These astronomical wheels mirror the north ecliptic polar region of the sky and are useful as celestial grids to track changes over millennial time periods.

Astronomer John Eddy investigated the Big Horn Medicine Wheel's structure in 1972 and made a number of discoveries. He published his findings in Science in 1974, in an article titled "Astronomical Alignment of the Big Horn Medicine Wheel". He found that cairns E and O were aligned in the direction of summer solstice sunrise, using cairn E for a backsight and cairn O as a foresight, and that cairns C and O were aligned in the direction of summer solstice sunset, using C as a backsight and O as a foresight.

Further, he found that cairn pairs FO, FA, and FB correspond to the rising points of the stars Sirius, Aldebaran, and Rigel, respectively. Observing the first yearly heliacal rising of these stars would have been an effective tool for determining the progress of the solar year, as the first heliacal rise of a star occurs on the same date (relative to the solstices) each year.

Rising positions of stars change very slowly over the centuries due to the Earth's precession, so the directions of these cairn pairs can be used to project at what date they aligned best with the rising points of these stars. The FA Aldebaran alignment would have worked best between AD 1200 and AD 1700. Precession also changes the date of first heliacal rise: although today the first heliacal rise of Aldebaran is a few days after the summer solstice, between AD 1200 and 1700 it would have occurred just before the summer solstice, allowing an observer to predict the coming of this event.

Astronomer Jack Robinson from the University of South Florida proposed that cairn pair FD was used to observe the rising of the star Fomalhaut, which would have lined up with its rising point between AD 1050 and AD 1450, when Fomalhaut had its first heliacal rise roughly a month before the summer solstice. A carbon date for the Bighorn Medicine Wheel was obtained from a piece of wood found in cairn F, corresponding to an age of no more than 220 years, placing its deposit roughly in the mid-18th century. However, this date can be considered only a minimum age, as the wood may have become lodged in the cairn after construction. Don Grey's "Summary Report" on the 1958 Wyoming Archaeology Society's excavation of the Wheel states (p. 317): "In the large cairn on the northwest side of the structure was found a piece of wood pinned down between the courses of stone in the wall. A sample was taken…for dating."

== Other wheels ==
In 1903, Stephen Simms of the Chicago Field Museum published a scientific paper on his visit to the Wheel. His published diagram differs from the appearance of the current landmark. More than one medicine wheel existed in the Bighorn Mountains before 1916. Cut Ear, a Crow guide, would accompany people to wheels in the Bighorn Mountains. One article in the Sheridan Post reports finding another wheel approximately 60 miles (97 km) from the Big Horn Medicine Wheel.

== Name change ==
The site was declared a National Historic Landmark in 1970, and renamed from Medicine Wheel to Medicine Wheel/Medicine Mountain in 2011.
