= Shortgrass Library System =

Public libraries in Alberta, Canada

Shortgrass Public Library System
- Type: Public Library System in Southeast Alberta.
- Established: 1988
- Branches: 14

Collection
- Items collected: books, eBooks, music, cds, periodicals, maps, genealogical archives, business directories, local history,

Other information
- Website: Shortgrass Library System

The Shortgrass Library System consists of fourteen member public libraries in Southeast Alberta, Canada. The system headquarters is located in Medicine Hat. It has the distinction of being the first regional library system in the province of Alberta to have all eligible municipalities as members of a library system. Shortgrass was created by the Alberta government in 1988 as the fifth library system in the province. Services provided by Shortgrass for member libraries include cataloguing, deliveries, maintenance of the automated library system, IT support, and licensing of digital content.

== Services ==
- Information and reference services
- Access to full text databases
- Community information
- Internet access
- Reader's advisory services
- Programs for children, youth and adults
- Delivery to homebound individuals
- Interlibrary loan
- Free downloadable audiobooks

== History ==
In 1988, the municipalities of Brooks, Medicine Hat, Redcliff, Foremost, Bow Island, and the County of 40 Mile formed the Shortgrass Library System (SLS). Also during 1988, municipalities were invited to bid on the location for the headquarters building. The communities of Brooks, Redcliff and Medicine Hat all bid on becoming the home of the future SLS Headquarters. After much deliberation, Medicine Hat was chosen. The Medicine Hat Public Library was designated as the resource center for SLS with responsibility for coordinating interlibrary services and providing reference services.

The Graham Community Library in Ralston entered into a contract with SLS in 2000. Then in 2003, the Town of Bassano and County of Newell (Divisions 1, 4, 5, 6 and 10, Rolling Hills and Rainier) joined SLS as municipal members. This meant that Alcoma Community Library, Bassano Memorial Library, and Rolling Hills Public Library became members in the Shortgrass Library system. Rosemary and the County of Newell Division 7 joined SLS in 2004. The municipalities of Cypress County and Tilley joined Shortgrass in 2005. Graham Community Library became a full member of SLS in 2005. On May 13, 2011, the Duchess and District Public Library agreed to become a partner with the Shortgrass Library System. With the Duchess and District Public Library becoming a member, the Shortgrass Library System is the first regional library system in the province of Alberta to have all eligible municipalities as members of the library system.

== Branches ==
As of June 2015, the following libraries are members of the Shortgrass Library System:

- Bassano Memorial Library
- Bow Island Municipal Library
- Brooks Public Library
- Duchess and District Public Library
- Foremost Municipal Library
- Gem Jubilee Library
- Medicine Hat Public Library
- Alcoma Public Library (located in Rainier)
- Graham Community Library (located in Ralston)
- Irvine Community Library (located in Irvine)
- Redcliff Public Library
- Rolling Hills Public Library
- Rosemary Community Library
- Tilley and District Public Library

SLS has provided contract services for the Medicine Hat School District #76 since 1997 and the Prairie Rose School Division #8 since 2004.
