= Medicine wheel =

Ancient stone circles in North America

Coordinates: 44.826°N 107.922°W

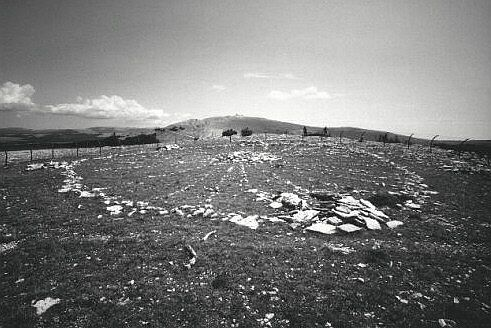
The Medicine Wheel in Bighorn National Forest, Wyoming, US

Medicine wheels are petroforms or circular formations of rocks on the land. Historically, most medicine wheels followed a similar pattern of a central circle or cluster of stones, surrounded by an outer ring of stones, along with spokes radiating from the center out to the surrounding ring. Often, but not always, the spokes may be aligned to the cardinal directions (East, South, West, and North). In other cases, some stones may be aligned with astronomical phenomena. These stone structures may be called "medicine wheels" by the Indigenous nation which built them, or by more specific names in that nation's language.

Physical medicine wheels made of stone have been constructed by many different Indigenous cultures in North America, notably many of the Plains nations. The structures are associated with Native American and Indigenous Canadian religious ceremonies.

== Nomenclature ==
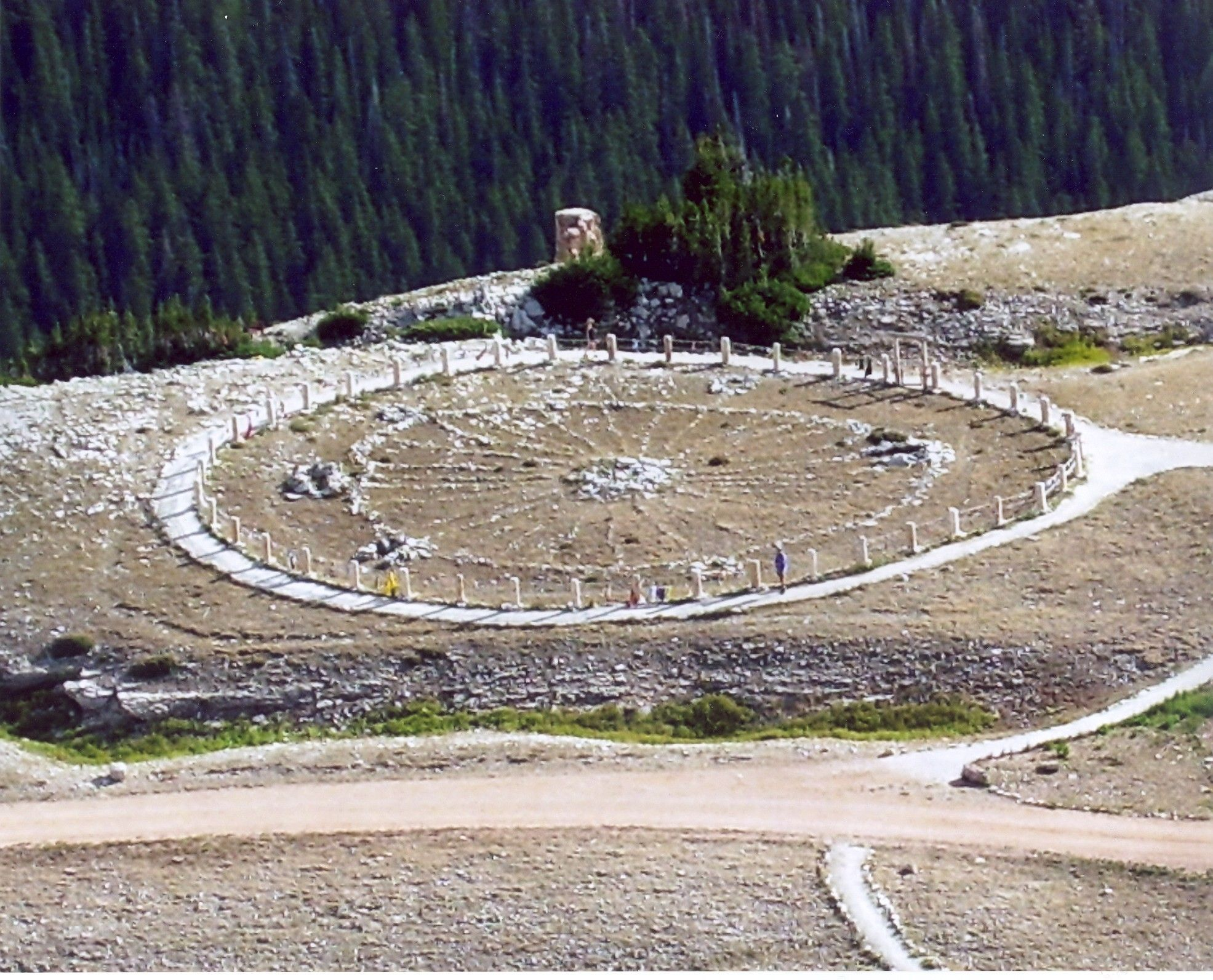
The Medicine Wheel in Bighorn National Forest, Wyoming

The Royal Alberta Museum (2005) holds that the term "medicine wheel" was first applied to the Big Horn Medicine Wheel in Wyoming, the southernmost archeological wheel still extant. The term "medicine" was not necessarily applied because of any healing associated with that medicine wheel, but denotes the sacred site and rock formations' importance and their religious, hallowed, and spiritual significance.

== Stone structures as sacred architecture ==
Intentionally erecting massive stone structures as sacred architecture is a well-documented activity of ancient monolithic and megalithic peoples.

The Royal Alberta Museum posits the possible point of origin, or parallel tradition, to other round structures such as the tipi lodge, stones used as "foundation stones" or "tent-pegs":

Scattered across the plains of Alberta are tens of thousands of stone structures. Most of these are simple circles of cobble stones which once held down the edges of the famous tipi of the Plains Indians; these are known as "tipi rings." Others, however, were of a more esoteric nature. Extremely large stone circles – some greater than 12 meters across – may be the remains of special ceremonial dance structures. A few cobble arrangements form the outlines of human figures, most of them obviously male. Perhaps the most intriguing cobble constructions, however, are the ones known as medicine wheels.

== Locality, siting and proxemics ==
Stone medicine wheels are sited throughout the northern United States and southern Canada, specifically South Dakota, Wyoming, Montana, Alberta and Saskatchewan. The majority of the approximately 70 documented stone structures still extant are in Alberta, Canada.

One of the prototypical medicine wheels is in the Bighorn National Forest in Big Horn County, Wyoming. This 75-foot-diameter (23 m) wheel has 28 spokes, and is part of a vast set of old Native American sites that document 7,000 years of their history in that area.

Medicine wheels are also found in Ojibwa territory, the common theory is that they were built by the prehistoric ancestors of the Assiniboine people.

Larger astronomical and ceremonial petroforms, and Hopewell mound building sites are also found in North America.

== Structure, fabrication and patterning ==
In defining the commonalities among different stone medicine wheels, the Royal Alberta Museum cites the definition given by John Brumley, an archaeologist from Medicine Hat, that a medicine wheel "consists of at least two of the following three traits: (1) a central stone cairn, (2) one or more concentric stone circles, and/or (3) two or more stone lines radiating outward from a central point."

From the air, a medicine wheel often looks like a wagon wheel lying on its side. The wheels can be large, reaching diameters of 75 feet.

The most common variation between different wheels are the spokes. There is no set number of spokes for a medicine wheel to have although there are usually 28, the same number of days in a lunar cycle. The spokes within each wheel are rarely evenly spaced, or even all the same length. Some medicine wheels will have one particular spoke that is significantly longer than the rest. The spokes may start from the center cairn and go out only to the outer ring, others go past the outer ring, and some spokes start at the outer ring and go out from there.

Sometimes there is a passageway, or a doorway, in the circles. The outer ring of stones will be broken, and there will be a stone path leading in to the center of the wheel. Some have additional circles around the outside of the wheel, sometimes attached to spokes or the outer ring, and sometimes floating free of the main structure.

While alignment with the cardinal directions is common, some medicine wheels are also aligned with astronomical phenomena involving the Sun, Moon, some stars, and some planets in relation to the Earth's horizon at that location. The wheels are generally considered to be sacred sites, connected in various ways to the builders' particular culture, lore and ceremonial ways.

Other North American Indigenous peoples have made somewhat-similar petroforms, turtle-shaped stone piles with the legs, head, and tail pointing out the directions and aligned with astronomical events.

== Cultural value, attribution and meaning ==
Stone medicine wheels have been built and used for ceremonies for millennia, and each one has enough unique characteristics and qualities that archaeologists have encountered significant challenges in determining with precision what each one was for.

One of the older wheels, the Majorville medicine wheel located south of Bassano, Alberta, has been dated at 3200 BCE (5200 years ago) by careful stratification of known artifact types. Like Stonehenge, it had been built up by successive generations who would add new features to the circle. Due to that and its long period of use (with a gap in its use between 3000 and 2000 years ago), archaeologists believe that the function of the medicine wheel changed over time.

Astronomer John Eddy put forth the suggestions that some of the wheels had astronomical significance, where spokes on a wheel could be pointing to certain stars, as well as sunrise or sunset, at a certain time of the year, suggesting that the wheels were a way to mark certain days of the year. In a paper for the Journal for the History of Astronomy Professor Bradley Schaefer stated that the claimed alignments for three wheels studied, the Bighorn medicine wheel, one at Moose Mountain in southeastern Saskatchewan, and one at Fort Smith, Montana, there was no statistical evidence for stellar alignments.

== Medicine Wheel Park ==
Joe Stickler of Valley City State University, North Dakota, with the assistance of his students, began the construction of Medicine Wheel Park in 1992. The Park showcases two solar calendars: "a horizon calendar (the medicine wheel) and a meridian or noontime calendar." According to the Medicine Wheel website, the "large circle measures 213 feet (approximately 65 meters) around. The 28 spokes radiating from its center represent the number of days in the lunar cycle. Six spokes extending well beyond the Wheel are aligned to the horizon positions of sunrises and sunsets on the first days of the four seasons."

== Medicine wheel symbol ==
A version of the medicine wheel symbol

The medicine wheel has been adapted into a visual symbol, with associated correspondences and meanings, by pretendian Hyemeyohsts Storm, who first published his invention in 1972. It has been adopted as a visual icon and teaching tool by a number of pan-Indian groups, as well as Native groups whose ancestors did not traditionally use medicine wheels as a structure. It has also been misappropriated by non-Indigenous people, usually those associated with New Age communities, who have often added additional elements from non-Native cultures.

== See also ==
- Medicine wheel (symbol)
- Archaeoastronomy
- Cahokia Woodhenge
- Inukshuk
- Original Keetoowah Society
- Rock art
- Sandpainting
- Temenos
