= Alberta SuperNet =

Municipal broadband network in Alberta, Canada

Alberta SuperNet is a municipal broadband network in the Canadian province of Alberta. The network links Alberta's public institutions, as well as rural communities and First Nations in the province. SuperNet was constructed as a public-private partnership between the government of Alberta, Bell West, and Axia NetMedia.

== Structure ==
The Alberta SuperNet began construction in 2001. It consists of two components: a base area network which serves 27 urban communities, and an "extended area" network which connects rural and First Nations areas to the SuperNet (shut down). The network provides layer 3 connectivity. Parts of the network, especially in Northern Alberta, utilize wireless links instead of fibre. Linking Fort Chipewyan was especially difficult, due to its terrain and the protected Wood Buffalo National Park—necessitating a 120 km wireless link from the Birch Mountains.

The network consists of over 13,000 kilometers of trenched fibre optic lines and wireless links, serving 429 communities.

Axia NetMedia was contracted to sell wholesale access to the network. On June 29, 2018, Service Alberta announced that it had declined to renew its contract with Axia NetMedia, and that it had reached a multi-year deal with Bell Canada to assume operations of SuperNet. Bell Canada subsequently announced the following Monday that it had also agreed to acquire Axia SuperNet Ltd., the local Axia subsidiary.

== Reception ==
Since Alberta SuperNet was not intended to serve as a last mile network, its success in bridging the rural-urban digital divide depends on private Internet service providers to connect rural homes and businesses to SuperNet. In many rural communities these services have been slow to develop due to the lack of a clear business case or economic incentive, resulting in criticism of this aspect of the SuperNet model.

In 2005, the Association of Canadian Engineering Companies gave the Award of Excellence to Morrison Hershfield for project management of the Alberta SuperNet.
