= Majorville Cairn and Medicine Wheel site =

Archaeological site in Canada

Majorville Medicine Wheel
- Iniskim Umaapi
- Majorville Medicine Wheel Majorville Cairn and Medicine Wheel site (Canada)
- 50°35′6.5569″N 112°24′37.7976″W
- Type: Monument
- Periods: Paleolithic
- Location: Alberta, Canada
- Region: North America

Site notes
- Material: stone

The Majorville Cairn and Medicine Wheel (Iniskim Umaapi) is an archaeological site of the Blackfoot Nation located south of Bassano, Alberta. The medicine wheel has been dated to 3200 BCE (5200 years ago) by careful stratification of known artifact types.

The medicine wheel sits on top of a grassy hill at an elevation of 918 m overlooking a large area of undisturbed prairie around the Bow River. The structure consists of a round stone cairn, 9 m in diameter, surrounded by a 27 m wide cobble circle connected to the cairn by 28 stone spokes. This arrangement is categorized as Subgroup 6 and of the total 67 known medicine wheels only 3 belong to this category, the other two being the Jennings site in South Dakota and Bighorn in Wyoming.

The southern half of the cairn has been excavated and the projectile points found indicate it was in use since the Oxbow/McKean Phase for the last 4500 years. The site was built in layers, with the earliest C_{14} date from the cairn determined at 3845 ± 85 radiocarbon years before present. Calibrated to calendar years this is 2384 ± 124 years before 1950, although this sample doesn't come from the earliest construction period. The sequence of construction is uncertain and it is not clear that spokes and wheel were built at the same time. Rocks and arrowheads were added to it until contact with Europeans, although there was a gap in its use between 3000 and 2000 years ago. Because of its use over such a long time and the changes in its construction, archaeologists believe that its function may have changed at times.

Among the stones, other findings included offerings in the form of sweet grass, willow, cloth, and tobacco. The site further yielded iniskim stones ("buffalo calling stones"), fragments of ammonite fossils that can be found in the bedrock exposed by the Bow River to the east of the site. Iniskim are small natural stones that resemble the shoulders and hump of a bison. In this case the petrified coils of ammonite shells that broke along the septa into small figurines with four prongs on one side resembling legs. These have been used in the Blackfoot Nation folklore to secure the return of the migrating bison.
