= The Alberta Library =

Library consortium

The Alberta Library (TAL) is a not-for-profit library consortium, created in 1997, consisting of 50 member libraries and library systems in over 300 locations in the Canadian province of Alberta. Members include public, post-secondary, government and special libraries.

The Alberta Library works to provide equitable access to high quality resources for all libraries in Alberta regardless of size. It also facilitates and encourages resource sharing amongst libraries.

== Services ==
TAL provides a variety of services to (or through) its members, including:

- Licensing - pricing negotiations for licenses to electronic resources
- TAL Card - A free TAL Library Card gives Albertans access to the print collections of all member libraries. Albertans can walk into over 300 public, post-secondary and special libraries across the province, borrow material, and return it to any participating library
- Support - financial or administrative support to library associations and libraries in Alberta
- Discovery Link – an opt-in licensing program that works to apply TALs licensing expertise to electronic resources for K-12 schools
- Lois Hole Campus Alberta Digital Library (LHCADL) - established in 2007 by the Alberta Government and is funded by Alberta Advanced Education. The grant pays the annual subscription costs for a set of commercially licensed digital resources accessed through 36 post-secondary and First Nations institutions in Alberta.
- Library Toolshed - The Toolshed is a collaborative initiative supported by The Alberta Library, The Association B.C. Public Library Directors, Saskatchewan’s Multitype Library Board and the Manitoba Public Library Services Branch, hosted by the B.C. Libraries Cooperative. The Toolshed is an online platform for library staff to share, download and comment on library training resources.
- Job Symposium - A yearly event for established library professionals to meet and talk with new graduates and library students about careers and professional development in the information field

== Past Services ==
- Netspeed - Netspeed was a conference hosted by The Alberta Library. It began in October 17, 1997 and had its last event in 2017. Its vision was to have librarians, technical staff and trustees explore new emerging technologies that were relevant to libraries.
- TAL Online - TAL Online was a search engine that provides a single interface to search all member library catalogues that launched in 2000. Beyond search, it also made available the ability to request books from other libraries and have them delivered to a home library via Inter-Library Loan. It was the first federated search platform of its kind for library catalogues in Alberta. It was superseded by OCLC’s Relais D2D in 2020 and will retire from use on March 31, 2022
- The Online Reference Center - The Online Reference Centre (ORC) provided free digital reference resources for use in Alberta K-12 schools, as well as training for the Centre’s use. The ORC was hosted on Alberta’s LearnAlberta portal and was funded through Alberta Education. It was available in both English and French. In 2021 it was superseded by TAL’s in-house K-12 opt-in service, Discovery Link.
